= Iron Mountain micropolitan area =

Coordinates: 45°49′21″N 88°3′51″W

Marinette–Iron Mountain, WI–MI Area
- Combined Statistical Area
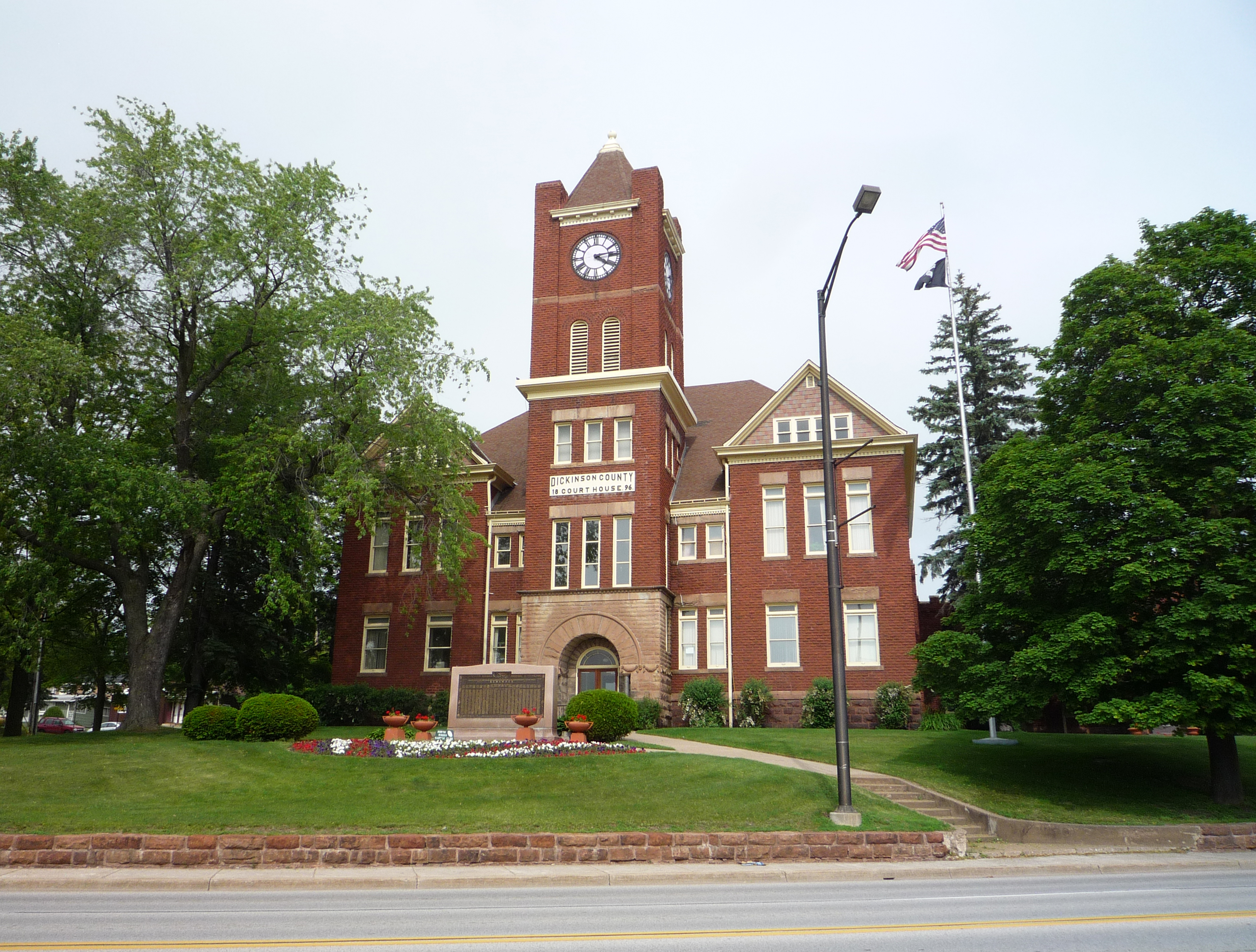
- Dickinson County Courthouse and Jail
Map of Marinette–Iron Mountain, WI–MI CSA
Marinette, WI–MI µSA
Iron Mountain, MI–WI µSA
City of Marinette, WI
City of Iron Mountain, MI
- Country: United States
- State: Wisconsin; Michigan
- Largest city: Marinette, WI
- Other city: Iron Mountain, MI
- Time zone: UTC−06:00 (CST)
  - Summer (DST): UTC−05:00 (CDT)

The Iron Mountain Micropolitan Statistical Area, as defined by the United States Census Bureau, is an area consisting of two counties – one in Michigan and one in Wisconsin – anchored by the city of Iron Mountain, Michigan. As of the 2000 census, the μSA had a population of 32,560 (though a July 1, 2009 estimate placed the population at 31,245).

== Counties ==
- Dickinson County, Michigan
- Florence County, Wisconsin

== Communities ==
=== Cities ===
- Iron Mountain, Michigan (Principal city)
- Kingsford, Michigan
- Norway, Michigan

=== Census-designated places ===
Note: All census-designated places are unincorporated.

- Florence, Wisconsin
- Quinnesec, Michigan

=== Unincorporated places ===
- Alfred, Michigan
- Channing, Michigan
- East Kingsford, Michigan
- Felch, Michigan
- Felch Mountain, Michigan
- Floodwood, Michigan
- Foster City, Michigan
- Granite Bluff, Michigan
- Hardwood, Michigan
- Hylas, Michigan
- Loretto, Michigan
- Merriman, Michigan
- Metropolitan, Michigan
- Ralph, Michigan
- Randville, Michigan
- Sagola, Michigan
- Skidmore, Michigan
- Spread Eagle, Wisconsin
- Theodore, Michigan
- Vulcan, Michigan
- Waucedah, Michigan

== Townships/Towns ==
=== Dickinson County Townships ===
- Breen
- Breitung
- Felch
- Norway
- Sagola
- Waucedah
- West Branch

=== Florence County Towns ===
- Aurora
- Commonwealth
- Fence
- Fern
- Florence
- Homestead
- Long Lake
- Tipler

== Demographics ==
As of the census of 2000, there were 32,560 people, 13,519 households, and 9,024 families residing within the μSA. The racial makeup of the μSA was 97.99% White, 0.12% African American, 0.50% Native American, 0.38% Asian, 0.03% Pacific Islander, 0.14% from other races, and 0.84% from two or more races. Hispanic or Latino of any race were 0.64% of the population.

The median income for a household in the μSA was $34,788, and the median income for a family was $41,931. Males had a median income of $33,682 versus $21,725 for females. The per capita income for the μSA was $21,725.

== See also ==
- Michigan census statistical areas
- Wisconsin census statistical areas
