= List of Michigan State Historic Sites in Dickinson County =

Location of Dickinson County in Michigan

The following is a list of Michigan State Historic Sites in Dickinson County, Michigan. Sites marked with a dagger (†) are also listed on the National Register of Historic Places in Dickinson County, Michigan.

== Current listings ==
Name	Image	Location	City	Listing date
Ardis Furnace†		NE corner of Aragon and Antoine streets	Iron Mountain	August 13, 1971
Asselin Dairy Building Demolished		US 2	Norway	May 17, 1978
Breitung-Vulcan Mine	Breitung-Vulcan Mine	4852 US 2	Vulcan	October 12, 1990
Carnegie Public Library		300 Ludington Street	Iron Mountain	February 7, 1977
Chapin Mine Steam Pump Engine†	Cornish Pump	300 Kent Street	Iron Mountain	February 19, 1958
Joseph Addison Crowell House	Joseph Addison Crowell House	326 East Ludington	Iron Mountain	April 24, 1979
Dickinson County Courthouse and Jail†		700 South Stephenson Avenue	Iron Mountain	November 7, 1977
Dickinson Inn Demolished		101 West "B" Street	Iron Mountain	September 16, 1986
James and Ida Goulette	James and Ida Goulette	300 Kent Street	Iron Mountain	September 16, 1988
Immaculate Conception Church†		500 East Blaine Street	Iron Mountain	June 15, 1979
Menominee Iron Range Informational Designation	Menominee Iron Range	Fumee Park, 1 mile east of Quinnesec on US 2	Breitung Township	August 23, 1956
Norway Spring	Norway Spring	1051 Murray Rd.	Norway Township	June 2, 1966
Quinnesec United Methodist Church	Quinnesec United Methodist Church	677 Division	Quinnesec	November 7, 1977

== See also ==
- National Register of Historic Places listings in Dickinson County, Michigan

== Sources ==
- Historic Sites Online – Dickinson County. Michigan State Housing Developmental Authority. Accessed January 23, 2011.
