= M-69 (Michigan highway) =

State highway in Michigan, United States

M-69
- M-69 highlighted in red

Route information
- Maintained by MDOT
- Length: 65.260 mi (105.026 km)
- Existed: c. July 1, 1919–present

Major junctions
- West end: US 2 / US 141 in Crystal Falls
- M-95 from Sagola to Randville; G-69 in Foster City
- East end: US 2 / US 41 near Bark River

Location
- Country: United States
- State: Michigan
- Counties: Iron, Dickinson, Menominee, Delta

Highway system
- Michigan State Trunkline Highway System; Interstate; US; State; Byways
← BL I-69	→ M-70
← G-18	G-30	→ G-38

M-69 is an east–west state trunkline highway in the Upper Peninsula (UP) of the U.S. state of Michigan. It connects with US Highway 2 (US 2) on both ends in Crystal Falls and near Bark River. In between, the highway runs for 65.26 miles (105.03 km) in rural UP forest lands.

Before the creation of the U.S. Highway System, the current M-69 was a portion of M-12. The original M-69 was replaced by US 102 and the M-69 designation was reused on a section of M-12 not replaced by US 2. Further changes to the current highway truncated it for three decades. The eastern section removed from M-69 was given the County-Designated Highway designation G-30 until the change was reversed. In 2002, the historic Paint River Bridge in Crystal Falls was rehabilitated, repairing it and restoring it to the original appearance.

== Route description ==
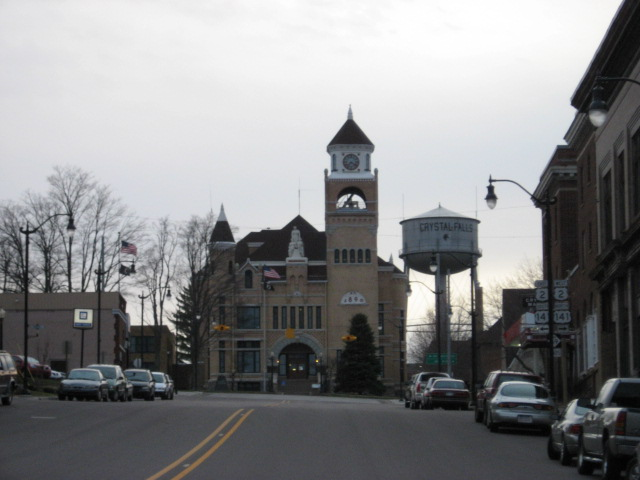
The Iron County Courthouse in Crystal Falls

M-69 starts at the intersection of 5th Street and Superior Avenue in Crystal Falls, where it meets US 2/US 141. The Iron County Courthouse is located at the head of Superior Avenue and overlooks a steep hill headed east through downtown. The City of Crystal Falls states that the courthouse offers "a view of the main street of the City and the scenic panorama of the valley at its feet". On a clear day, Iron Mountain can be seen from the courthouse tower. It is from this starting point that M-69 descends Superior Avenue through downtown toward the Paint River in Iron County. The highway crosses the river on a historic bridge built in 1929 that features decorative lamp posts and railings. The bridge was rehabilitated for five months in 2002. This rehabilitation involved replacing the bridge deck, repairing the bridge's substructure, and restoring the lighting and railings to original designs. Because this bridge is listed on Michigan's list of historic bridges, the construction work had to preserve the original historic character of the bridge. Final construction was completed at a cost of $1,130,545 (equivalent to $1.88 million in 2024). A complete bridge replacement would have cost 25% more without saving the historic bridge.

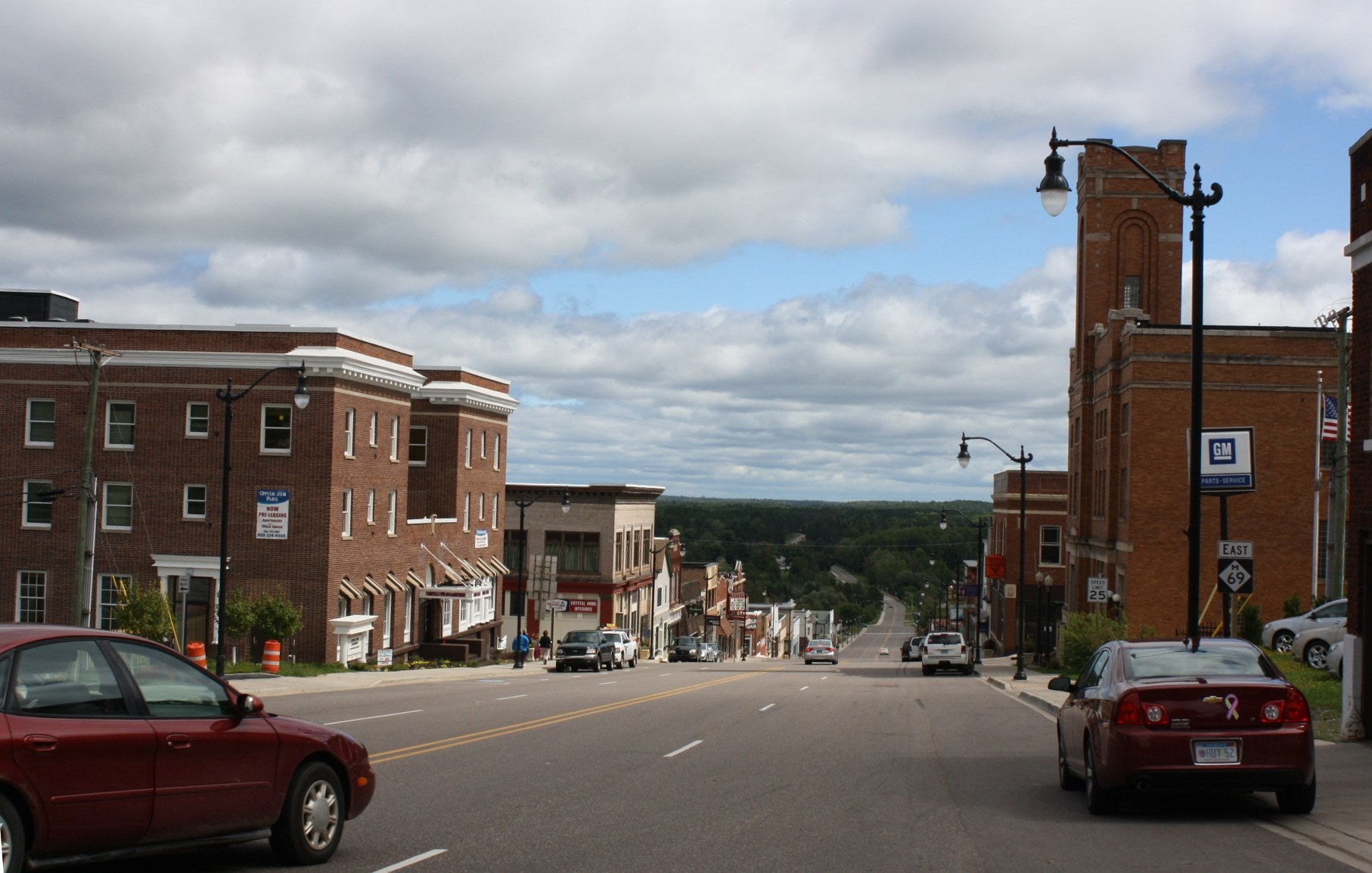
Looking east from the western terminus

On the opposite bank of the river, Superior Avenue climbs a hill past the Evergreen Cemetery at the top. The section of roadway up to this point carries the highest levels of traffic as measured by the Michigan Department of Transportation (MDOT) in their annual average daily traffic (AADT) surveys. Some 3,900 vehicles used this segment of trunkline daily in 2007. Outside of town, the trunkline runs south of Runkle Lake through hilly, wooded terrain. The roadway crosses the southern section of the Michigamme River west of the Dickinson County line.

Running around two miles (3.2 km) east of the county line, M-69 meets M-95 in the unincorporated community of Sagola. The post office in Sagola was established in 1889 to serve the timber-harvesting community. M-69 turns south along M-95, and together the two highways run south for about six miles (9.7 km) concurrently to the unincorporated community of Randville. This segment of the trunkline had the highest commercial traffic in the state's AADT surveys. Some 560 trucks used this roadway daily in 2007, according to MDOT. This second unincorporated community was settled for iron mining at the adjacent Groveland Mine at the turn of the century. M-69 and M-95 separate in Randville as the former turns east and the latter continues southward.

Between Randville and the former community of Metropolitan, M-69 runs along the West Branch of the Sturgeon River through more hilly terrain. The trunkline continues east to the twin communities of Theodore and Felch. The river and the road part ways until meeting again at Foster City. This is also the location of a unique junction of highways. M-69 meets G-69, a County-Designated Highway that runs south to Loretto in southern Dickinson County. The intersection in unique because some states, such as California, do not allow two highways to share a common number.

The highway continues to follow the river until crossing it at Hardwood before curving southeasterly and crossing into northern Menominee County. The highway crosses the northern end of the county through relatively flat terrain. The lowest AADT counts were measured here in 2007 at 550 vehicles. Near the unincorporated community of Perronville, the roadway runs through hills near a crossing of the Ten Mile Creek west of the county line. Continuing to the southeast, M-69 meets the community of Schaffer at the Delta County line. This line marks the transition from the Central Time Zone to the Eastern Time Zone. In Delta County, M-69 turns south along the Bark River and crosses its north branch. Just after running about 5 1/4 miles (8.4 km) into the county, M-69 crosses a set of railroad tracks from the Canadian National Railway's Wisconsin Central. There it meets US 2/US 41 east of the community of Bark River, home to the Hannahville Indian Community. This marks the western end of the highway, halfway between Bark River and Hyde, west of Escanaba.

== History ==
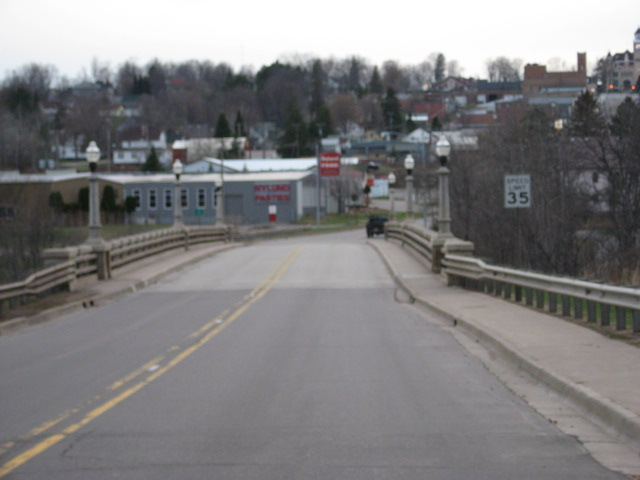
Approaching the historic 1929 bridge over the Paint River

In 1919, M-69 started at the state line south of Crystal Falls. It ran north through Crystal Falls, where it intersected M-12, to end in Covington at an intersection with M-28. This roadway was redesignated with the creation of the U.S. Highway System in 1926. US 2 replaced M-69 south and M-12 west of Crystal Falls. US 102 replaced M-69 north of Crystal Falls, and the latter designation was reused on the section of M-12 east of town. Where the roadway intersected M-45 (now M-95) in Sagola, M-69 joined it to Randville and then replaced M-90 east to Foster City by 1927. By 1930, the highway was extended through Menominee County into Delta County to end at an intersection with US 2/US 41 east of Bark River. This extension gave M-69 its current routing.

In the late 1930s, the state had a general program to abandon some 250 miles (400 km) of state highways with a daily traffic level of less than 300 vehicles. On July 26, 1939, the state turned over 5.8 miles (9.3 km) of M-69 in Delta County, but the Delta County Road Commission immediately filed a protest to block the transfer. The Dickinson County Road Commission had already protested the abandonment of 23.5 miles (37.8 km) of M-69 in that county. Maps published later that year do not indicate any change in jurisdiction to the highway.

In 1960, the section of M-69 east of Randville was decommissioned, and the concurrency with M-95 was removed. This truncated the highway to 12.834 miles (20.654 km), approximately one-fifth of its previous length. The transfer to county control was part of a program to reduce the total state highway mileage in the state. After October 5, 1970, this section was renamed G-30 with the beginning of the County-Designated Highway program in Michigan.

G-30
- Location: Randville–Hyde
- Length: 46.470 mi (74.786 km)
- Existed: c. October 5, 1970–1993

At various points, the road commissions in Dickinson, Menominee and Delta counties tried to give the roadway back to the state for maintenance. Menominee County made the request in 1974 and 1982, both times rejected because the road did not carry enough traffic to be a state highway. The road was a maintenance issue for the counties because of its relative isolation and high truck traffic carrying pulpwood to the paper mill in Escanaba and potatoes from farms near Felch. The roadway was in a relative state of disrepair in 1982, and the counties wanted the state to fix it. Menominee County estimated that it would cost $500,000 (equivalent to $1.37 million in 2024) for their 18-mile (29 km) stretch, while Dickinson estimated that it would cost $1 million (equivalent to $2.74 million in 2024) for their 27 miles (43 km).

This county road designation lasted until 1993. That year, the changes made in 1960 were reversed and M-69 was re-extended along M-95 and back to the Bark River area.

== Major intersections ==
County	Location	mi	km	Destinations	Notes
Iron	Crystal Falls	0.000	0.000	US 2 / US 141 – Ironwood, Iron Mountain	
Dickinson	Sagola	12.834	20.654	M-95 north – Republic, Marquette	Pre-1993 eastern terminus; northern end of M-95 concurrency
Dickinson	Randville	18.790	30.240	M-95 south – Iron Mountain	Pre-1993 western terminus of G-30; southern end of M-95 concurrency
Dickinson	Foster City	35.343	56.879	G-69 south – Loretto	
Menominee	No major junctions				
Delta	Bark River Township	65.260	105.026	US 2 / US 41 – Escanaba, Iron Mountain, Menominee	
1.000 mi = 1.609 km; 1.000 km = 0.621 mi: Concurrency terminus
