= Dickinson County, Michigan =

County in Michigan, United States

- County
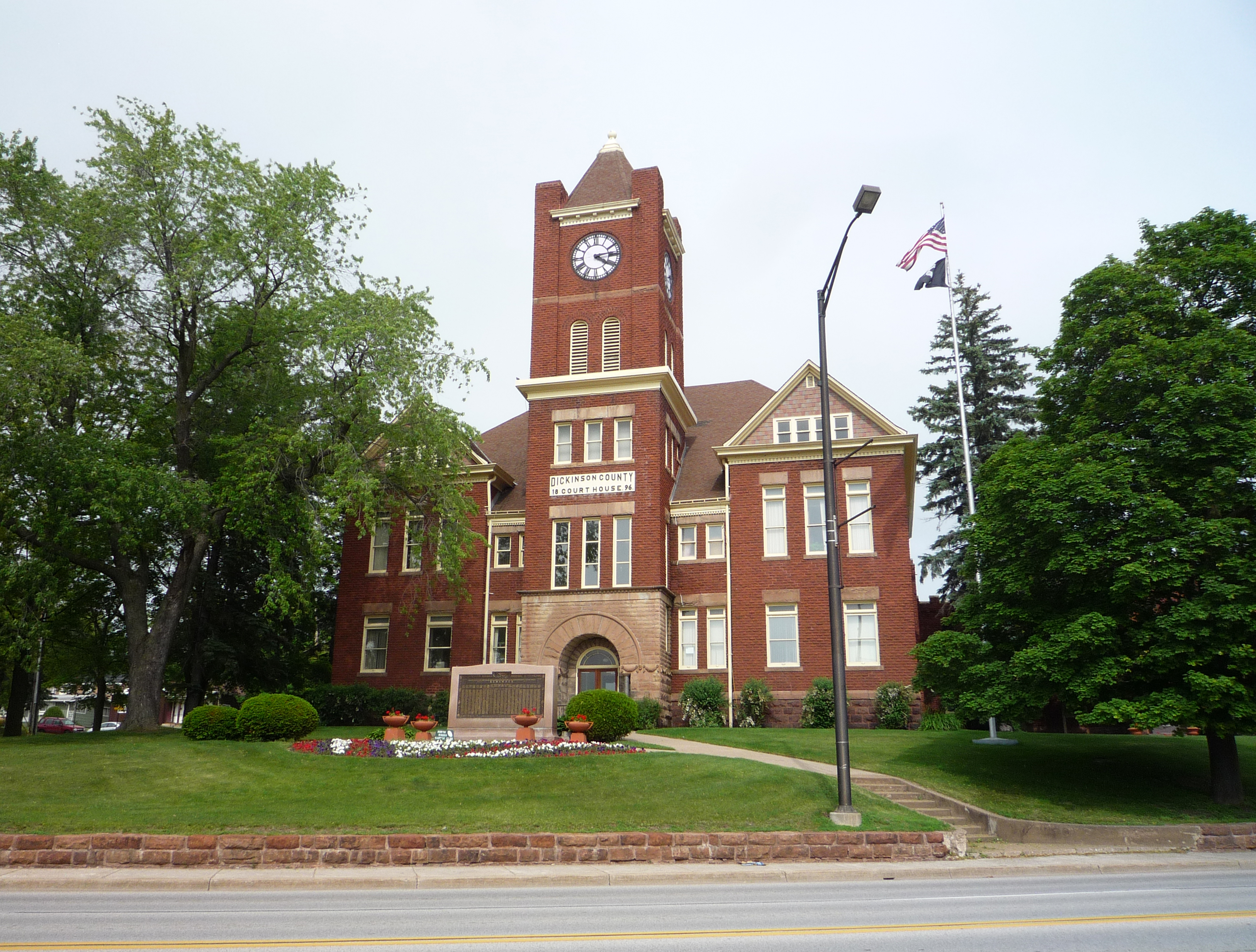
- Dickinson County Courthouse

- Location within the U.S. state of Michigan
- Coordinates: 46°00′N 87°52′W
- Country: United States
- State: Michigan
- Founded: 1891
- Named for: Donald M. Dickinson
- Seat: Iron Mountain
- Largest city: Iron Mountain

Area
  - Total: 777 sq mi (2,010 km^{2})
  - Land: 761 sq mi (1,970 km^{2})
  - Water: 16 sq mi (41 km^{2}) 2.0%

Population (2020)
  - Total: 25,947
  - Estimate (2025): 25,827 ▼
  - Density: 34.1/sq mi (13.2/km^{2})
- Time zone: UTC−6 (Central)
  - Summer (DST): UTC−5 (CDT)
- Congressional district: 1st
- Website: www.dickinsoncountymi.gov

Dickinson County is a county in the Upper Peninsula of the U.S. state of Michigan. As of the 2020 census, the population was 25,947. The county seat is Iron Mountain. Dickinson is Michigan's newest county, formed in 1891 from parts of Marquette, Menominee, and Iron counties. It was named for Donald M. Dickinson, who served as U.S. Postmaster General under President Grover Cleveland.

Dickinson County is part of the Iron Mountain, MI–WI micropolitan statistical area.

== Geography ==
According to the U.S. Census Bureau, the county has a total area of 777 square miles (2,010 km^{2}), of which 761 square miles (1,970 km^{2}) is land and 16 square miles (41 km^{2}) (2.0%) is water. Along with its western neighbor Iron County, it is one of only two landlocked counties in the Upper Peninsula.

=== Major highways ===
- US 2
- US 8
- US 141
- M-69
- M-95
- G-69

=== Airport ===
- KIMT - Ford Airport

=== Adjacent counties ===
- Marquette County (north)
- Menominee County (southeast)
- Marinette County, Wisconsin (south)
- Florence County, Wisconsin (southwest)
- Iron County (northwest)

== Communities ==
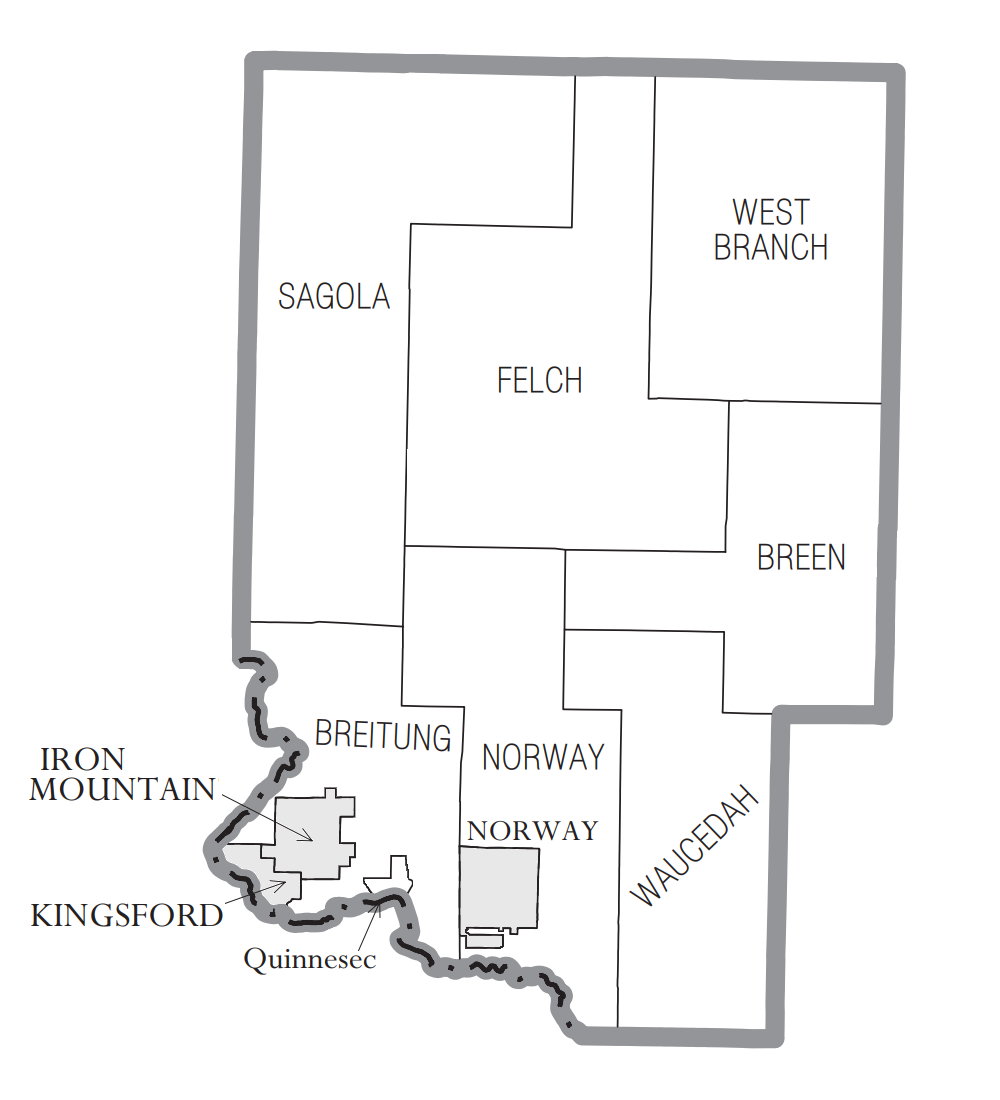
U.S. Census data map showing local municipal boundaries within Dickinson County, as well as the CDP of Quinnesec. Shaded areas represent incorporated cities.

=== Cities ===
- Iron Mountain (county seat)
- Kingsford
- Norway

=== Charter township ===
- Breitung Charter Township

=== Civil townships ===
- Breen Township
- Felch Township
- Norway Township
- Sagola Township
- Waucedah Township
- West Branch Township

=== Census-designated place ===
- Quinnesec

=== Other unincorporated communities ===
- Alfred
- Antoine
- Channing
- East Kingsford
- Felch
- Felch Mountain
- Floodwood
- Foster City
- Granite Bluff
- Hardwood
- Hylas
- Loretto
- Merriman
- Metropolitan
- Ralph
- Randville
- Sagola
- Skidmore
- Spruce
- Theodore
- Turner
- Vulcan
- Waucedah

== Demographics ==
Historical population
Census	Pop.	Note	%±
1900	17,890		—
1910	20,524		14.7%
1920	19,456		−5.2%
1930	29,941		53.9%
1940	28,731		−4.0%
1950	24,844		−13.5%
1960	23,917		−3.7%
1970	23,753		−0.7%
1980	25,341		6.7%
1990	26,831		5.9%
2000	27,472		2.4%
2010	26,168		−4.7%
2020	25,947		−0.8%
2025 (est.)	25,827	▼	−0.5%
U.S. Decennial Census; 1790-1960 1900-1990; 1990-2000 2010-2018

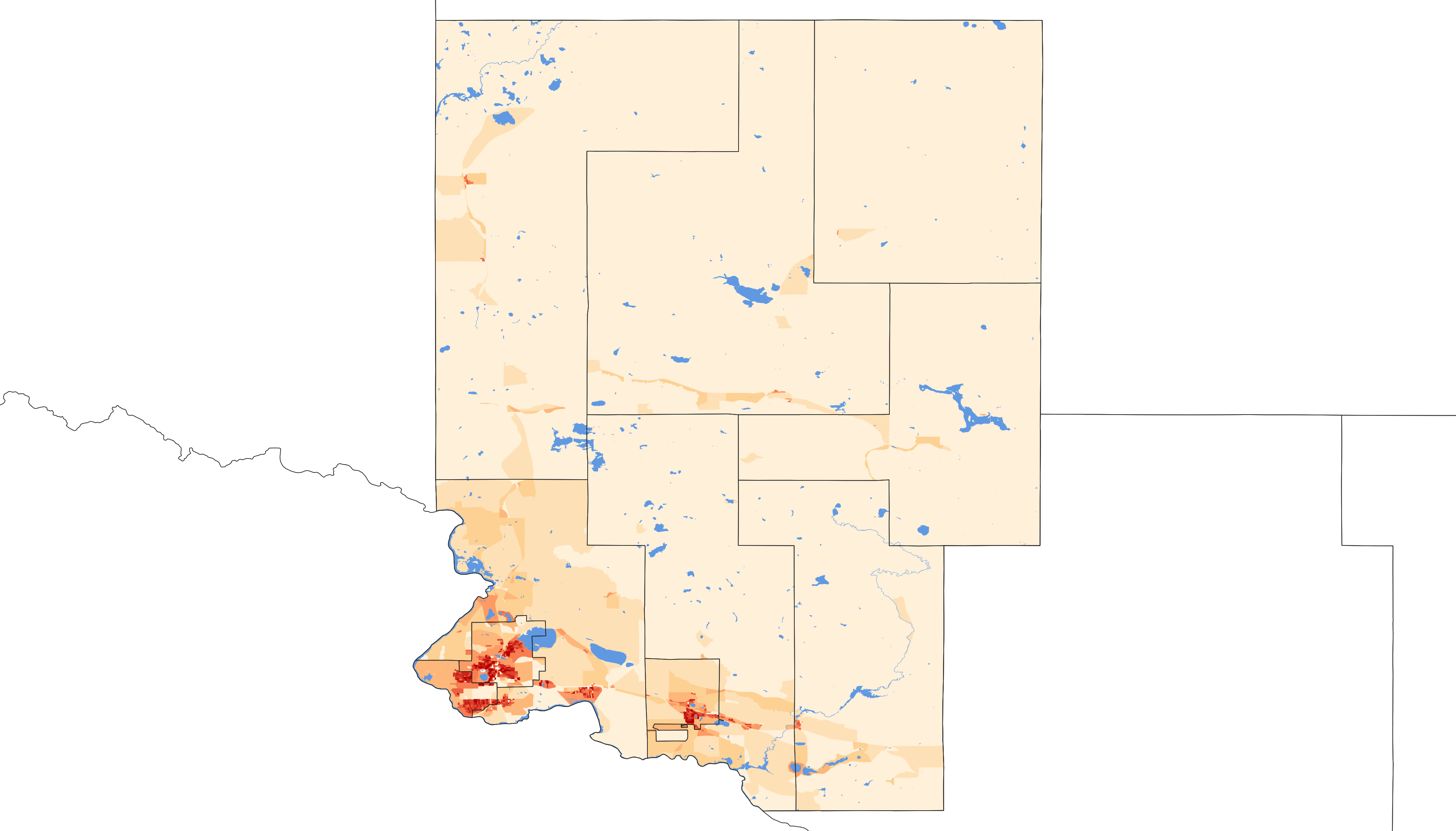
Population density of Dickinson County MI by 2020 census block

=== Racial and ethnic composition ===
Dickinson County, Michigan – Racial and ethnic composition Note: the US Census treats Hispanic/Latino as an ethnic category. This table excludes Latinos from the racial categories and assigns them to a separate category. Hispanics/Latinos may be of any race.
Race / Ethnicity (NH = Non-Hispanic)	Pop 1980	Pop 1990	Pop 2000	Pop 2010	Pop 2020	% 1980	% 1990	% 2000	% 2010	% 2020
White alone (NH)	25,203	26,459	26,794	25,269	24,198	99.46%	98.61%	97.53%	96.56%	93.26%
Black or African American alone (NH)	8	23	32	86	61	0.03%	0.09%	0.12%	0.33%	0.24%
Native American or Alaska Native alone (NH)	37	130	135	138	117	0.15%	0.48%	0.49%	0.53%	0.45%
Asian alone (NH)	26	96	108	120	147	0.10%	0.36%	0.39%	0.46%	0.57%
Native Hawaiian or Pacific Islander alone (NH)	x	x	7	7	4	x	x	0.03%	0.03%	0.02%
Other race alone (NH)	21	7	9	3	43	0.08%	0.03%	0.03%	0.01%	0.17%
Mixed race or Multiracial (NH)	x	x	200	275	937	x	x	0.73%	1.05%	3.61%
Hispanic or Latino (any race)	46	116	187	270	440	0.18%	0.43%	0.68%	1.03%	1.70%
Total	25,341	26,831	27,472	26,168	25,947	100.00%	100.00%	100.00%	100.00%	100.00%

=== 2020 census ===
As of the 2020 census, the county had a population of 25,947. The median age was 47.0 years, with 19.9% of residents under the age of 18 and 23.2% of residents 65 years of age or older. For every 100 females there were 100.7 males, and for every 100 females age 18 and over there were 99.6 males age 18 and over.

The racial makeup of the county was 94.0% White, 0.3% Black or African American, 0.5% American Indian and Alaska Native, 0.6% Asian, <0.1% Native Hawaiian and Pacific Islander, 0.5% from some other race, and 4.2% from two or more races. Hispanic or Latino residents of any race comprised 1.7% of the population.

64.8% of residents lived in urban areas, while 35.2% lived in rural areas.

There were 11,569 households in the county, of which 24.2% had children under the age of 18 living in them. Of all households, 46.7% were married-couple households, 21.8% were households with a male householder and no spouse or partner present, and 24.1% were households with a female householder and no spouse or partner present. About 32.8% of all households were made up of individuals and 15.4% had someone living alone who was 65 years of age or older.

There were 13,917 housing units, of which 16.9% were vacant. Among occupied housing units, 78.4% were owner-occupied and 21.6% were renter-occupied. The homeowner vacancy rate was 1.8% and the rental vacancy rate was 8.6%.

=== 2010 American Community Survey 3-year estimates ===
The 2010 American Community Survey 3-year estimate indicated the median income for a household in the county was $42,331 and the median income for a family was $52,222. Males had a median income of $31,402 versus $14,957 for females. The per capita income for the county was $22,583. About 3.4% of families and 10.9% of the population were below the poverty line, including 11.4% of those under the age 18 and 11.3% of those age 65 or over.

== Government ==
United States presidential election results for Dickinson County, Michigan
Year	Republican		Democratic		Third party(ies)	
Year	No.	%	No.	%	No.	%
1892	1,606	51.05%	1,255	39.89%	285	9.06%
1896	2,608	80.59%	528	16.32%	100	3.09%
1900	2,858	84.51%	451	13.34%	73	2.16%
1904	2,984	87.84%	283	8.33%	130	3.83%
1908	2,507	76.18%	544	16.53%	240	7.29%
1912	1,371	40.90%	361	10.77%	1,620	48.33%
1916	2,393	60.63%	1,291	32.71%	263	6.66%
1920	3,539	76.65%	580	12.56%	498	10.79%
1924	4,538	68.66%	400	6.05%	1,671	25.28%
1928	5,840	55.57%	4,626	44.02%	43	0.41%
1932	5,120	42.55%	6,483	53.88%	429	3.57%
1936	4,563	35.28%	7,952	61.48%	419	3.24%
1940	6,188	44.65%	7,582	54.71%	89	0.64%
1944	4,987	42.11%	6,740	56.92%	115	0.97%
1948	4,417	39.06%	6,295	55.66%	597	5.28%
1952	6,045	51.18%	5,710	48.34%	56	0.47%
1956	6,200	54.72%	5,113	45.13%	17	0.15%
1960	5,336	44.49%	6,645	55.40%	14	0.12%
1964	3,365	29.79%	7,921	70.12%	11	0.10%
1968	4,920	43.95%	5,726	51.15%	548	4.90%
1972	5,989	51.12%	5,339	45.57%	387	3.30%
1976	5,922	48.63%	6,134	50.37%	121	0.99%
1980	6,614	50.58%	5,694	43.54%	769	5.88%
1984	6,880	54.91%	5,614	44.80%	36	0.29%
1988	6,158	49.89%	6,129	49.66%	56	0.45%
1992	4,273	32.79%	5,689	43.66%	3,069	23.55%
1996	4,408	38.03%	5,614	48.43%	1,569	13.54%
2000	6,932	54.02%	5,533	43.12%	367	2.86%
2004	7,734	57.08%	5,650	41.70%	165	1.22%
2008	7,049	52.96%	5,995	45.04%	267	2.01%
2012	7,688	59.82%	4,952	38.53%	211	1.64%
2016	8,580	64.84%	3,923	29.65%	729	5.51%
2020	9,617	65.80%	4,744	32.46%	254	1.74%
2024	10,324	67.42%	4,763	31.11%	225	1.47%

United States Senate election results for Dickinson County, Michigan1
Year	Republican		Democratic		Third party(ies)	
Year	No.	%	No.	%	No.	%
2024	10,076	66.72%	4,662	30.87%	364	2.41%

Michigan Gubernatorial election results for Dickinson County
Year	Republican		Democratic		Third party(ies)	
Year	No.	%	No.	%	No.	%
2022	7,446	62.12%	4,310	35.96%	230	1.92%

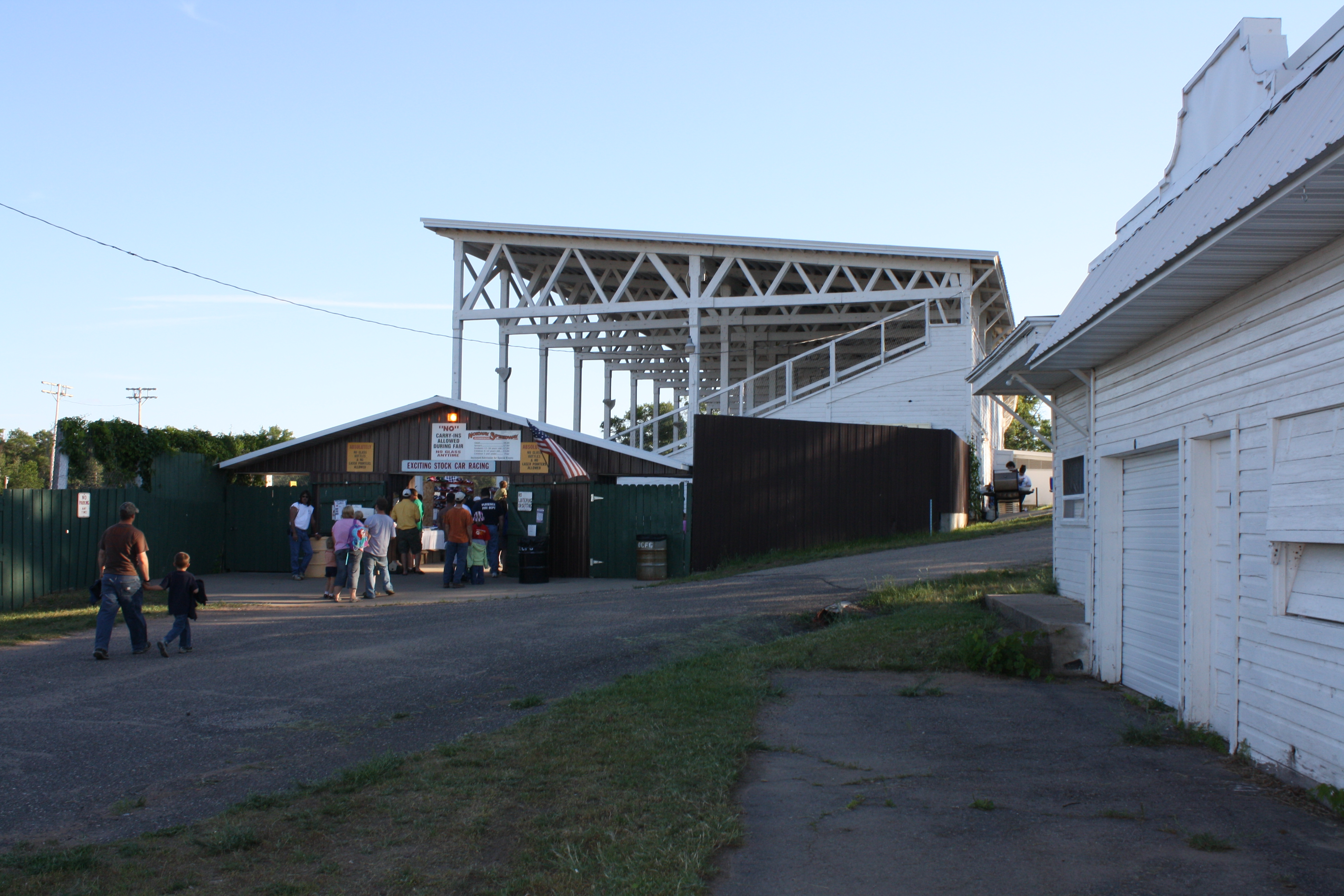
Dickinson County fairgrounds

The county government operates the jail, maintains rural roads, operates the major local courts, keeps files of deeds and mortgages, maintains vital records, administers public health regulations, and participates with the state in the provision of welfare and other social services. The county board of commissioners controls the budget but has only limited authority to make laws or ordinances. In Michigan, most local government functions — police and fire, building and zoning, tax assessment, street maintenance, etc. — are the responsibility of individual cities and townships. In the 2006 elections, it was also the most supportive county of proposal 2, a state constitutional amendment banning affirmative action programs. It received 74.2% support in the county.

The county was a bellwether in every presidential election from 1920 to 2004 (with exception to 1968).

In August of 2024, Dickinson County Undersheriff Chris Kuenzer announced a full staff of sworn officers.

=== Elected officials ===
- Prosecuting Attorney: Abbey Anderson
- Sheriff: Aaron Rochon
- Undersheriff: Christopher Kuenzer
- County Clerk: Dolly Cook
- Register of Deeds: Unknown
- County Treasurer: Lorna Carey
- Drain Commissioner: Kevin Trevillain
- Mine Inspector: Steven Smith

(information as of July 2013)

== See also ==
- List of Michigan State Historic Sites in Dickinson County
- National Register of Historic Places listings in Dickinson County, Michigan
