= Waucedah Township, Michigan =

- Civil township
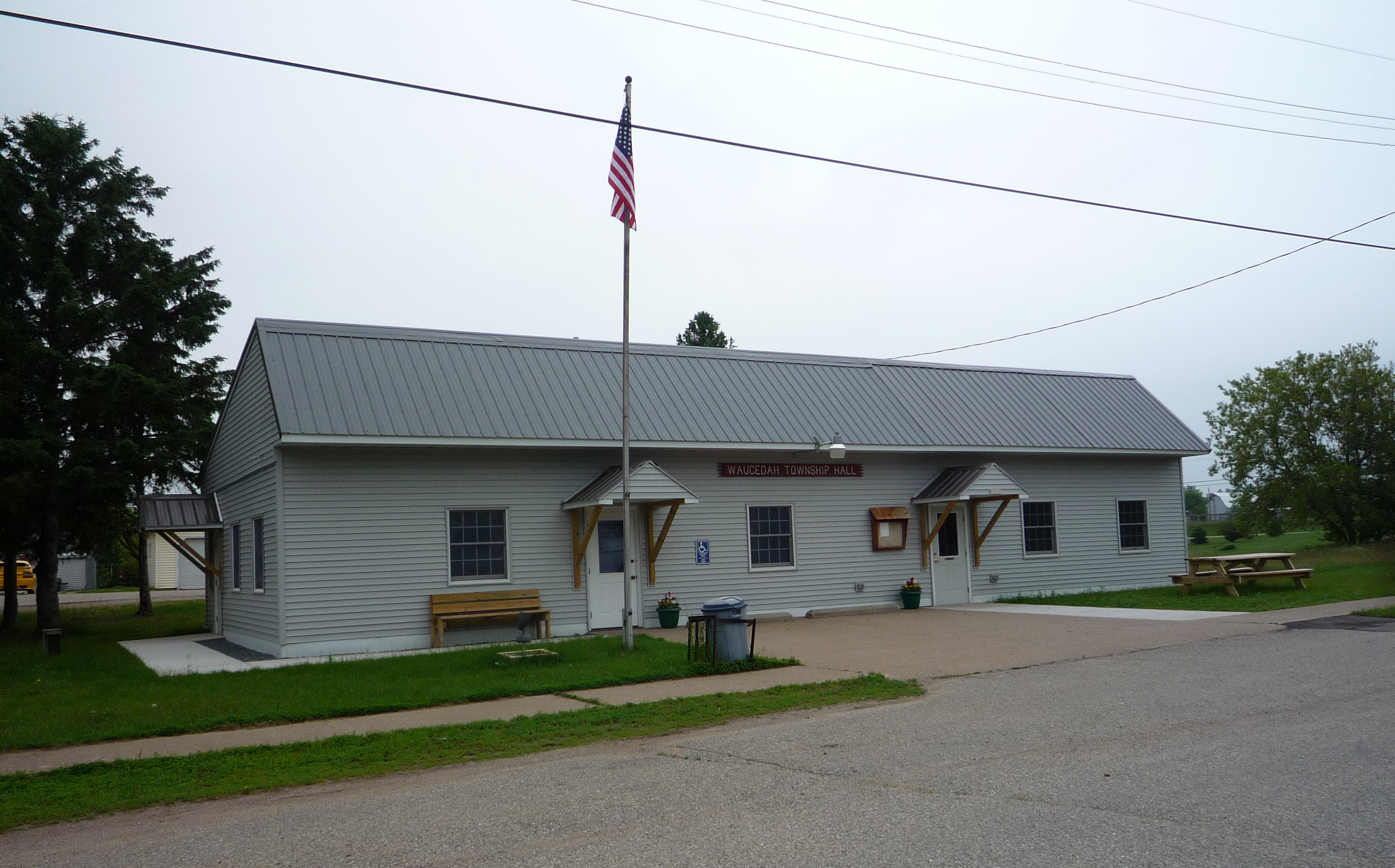
- Waucedah Township Hall in Loretto

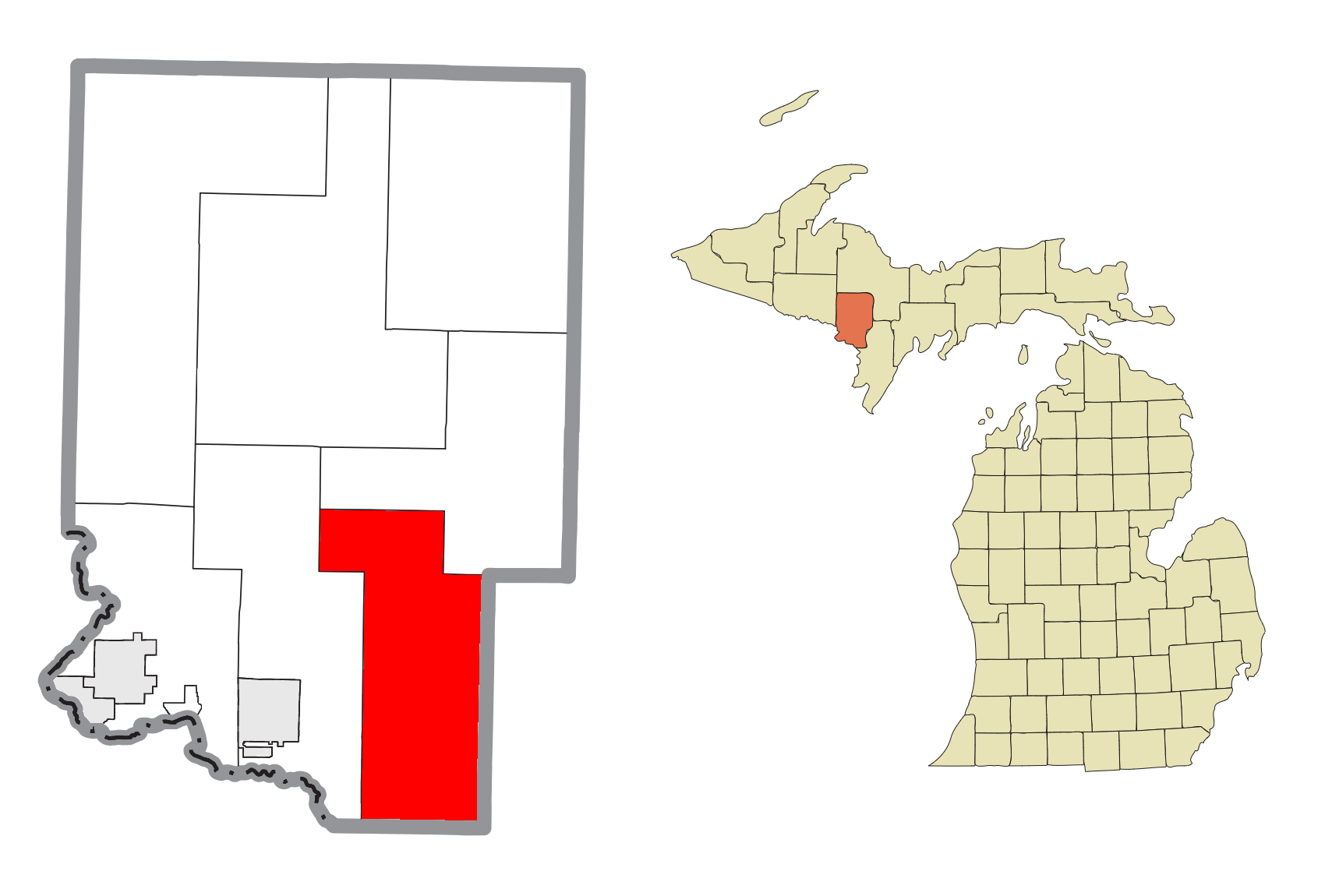
- Location within Dickinson County

- Location within the state of Michigan Location within the United States
- Coordinates: 45°49′10″N 87°46′41″W
- Country: United States
- State: Michigan
- County: Dickinson

Government
  - Supervisor: Louis Sturm
  - Clerk: Lori Turri

Area
  - Total: 90.24 sq mi (233.72 km^{2})
  - Land: 88.50 sq mi (229.21 km^{2})
  - Water: 1.74 sq mi (4.51 km^{2})
- Elevation: 988 ft (301 m)

Population (2020)
  - Total: 809
  - Density: 9.14/sq mi (3.53/km^{2})
- Time zone: UTC-6 (Central (CST))
  - Summer (DST): UTC-5 (CDT)
- ZIP code(s): 49834 (Foster City); 49852 (Loretto); 49892 (Vulcan)
- Area code: 906
- FIPS code: 26-84700
- GNIS feature ID: 1627227
- Website: Official website

Waucedah Township is a civil township of Dickinson County in the U.S. state of Michigan. The population was 809 at the 2020 census.

== Geography ==
According to the United States Census Bureau, the township has a total area of 90.0 square miles (233.2 km^{2}), of which, 88.9 square miles (230.4 km^{2}) of it is land and 1.1 square miles (2.8 km^{2}) of it (1.21%) is water.

== Communities ==
- Waucedah is an unincorporated community in the township on U.S. Highway 2 at 45°45′47″N 87°44′43″W.
- Loretto is an unincorporated community in the township on the Sturgeon River at 45°46′38″N 87°48′54″W. It is on U.S. Highway 2 about three miles (4.8 km) west of Waucedah and about six miles (9.7 km) east of Norway.

== Demographics ==
As of the census of 2000, there were 800 people, 325 households, and 233 families residing in the township. By 2020, its population was 809.
