= Quinnesec, Michigan =

- Census-designated place (CDP) & unincorporated community
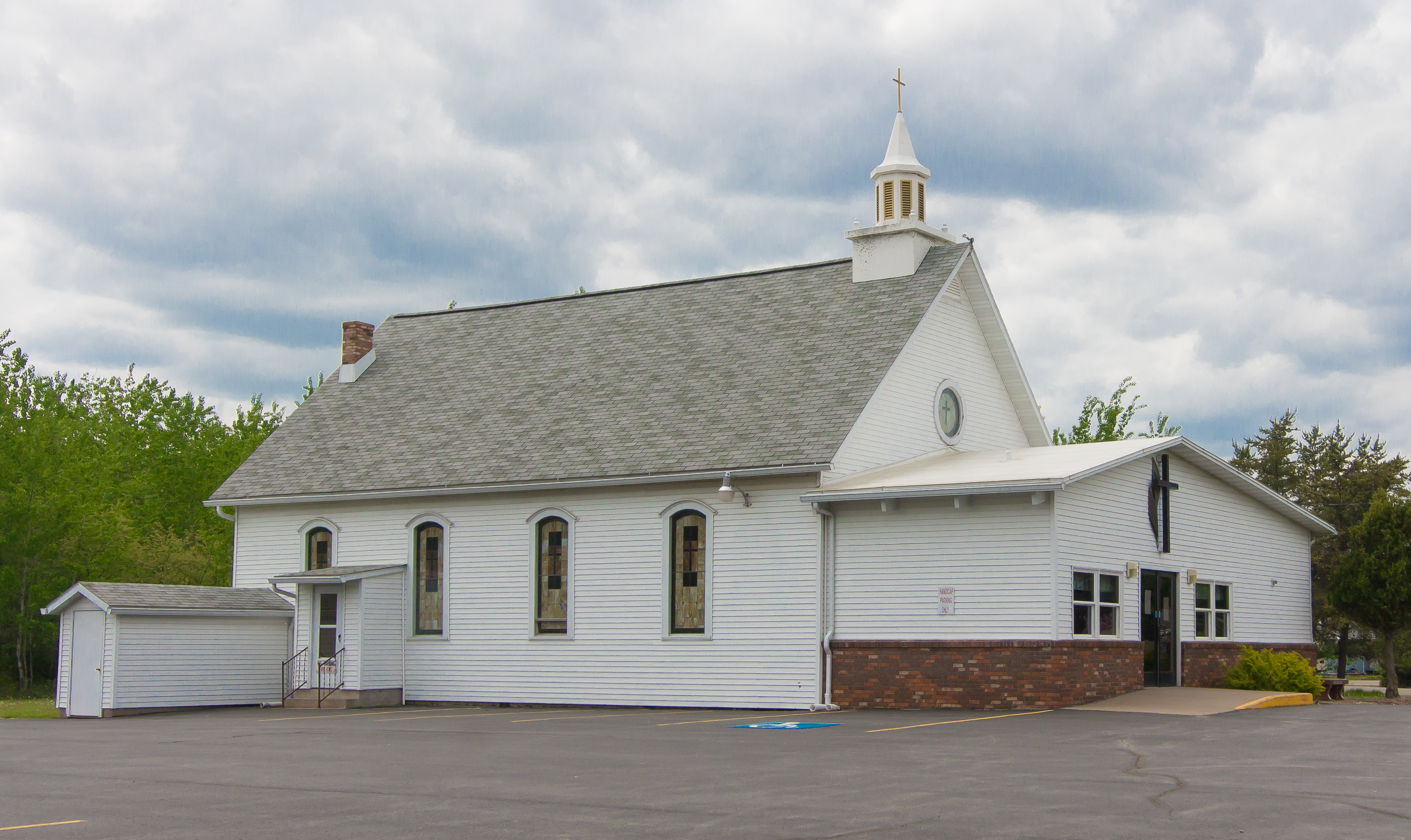
- Quinnesec United Methodist Church

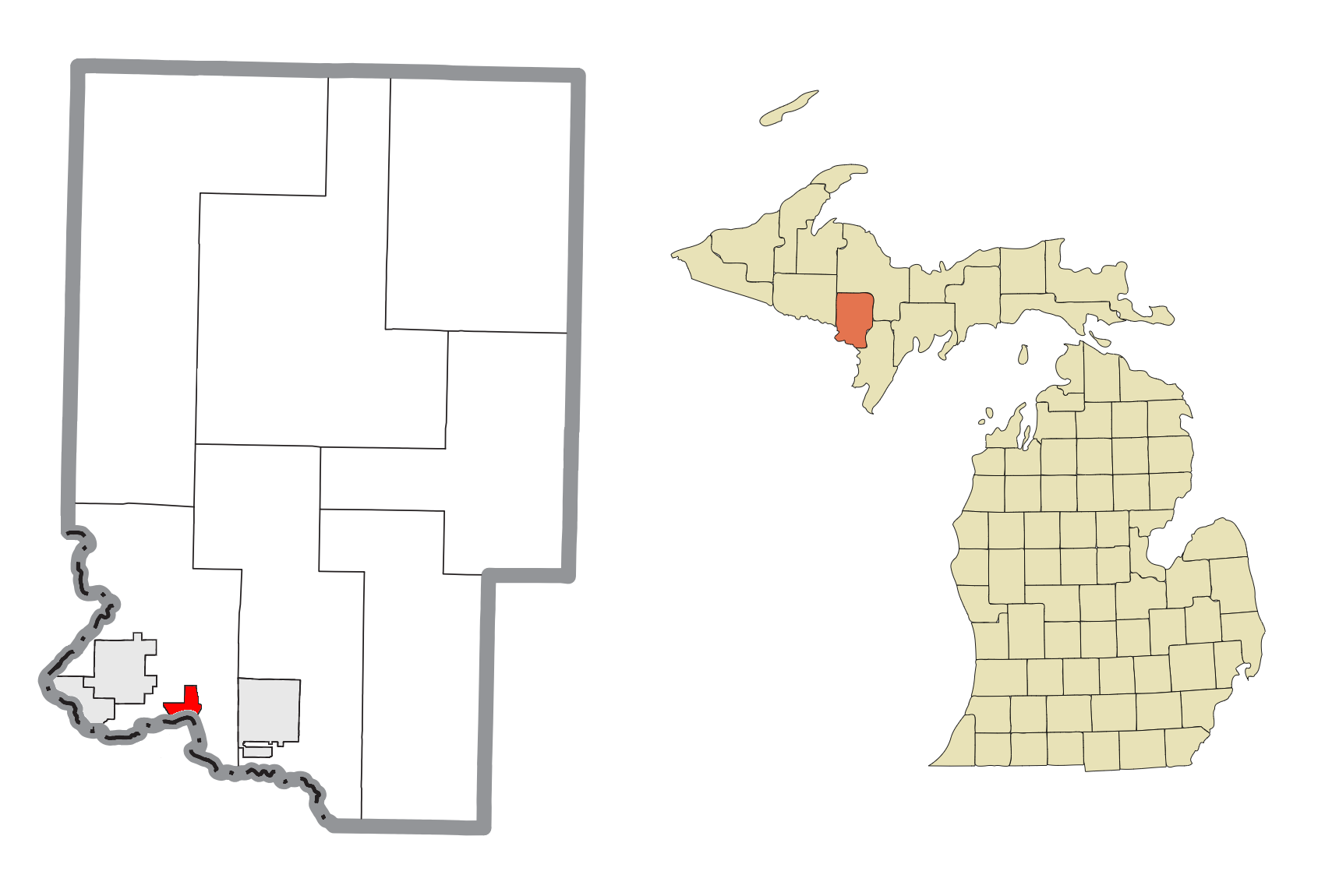
- Location within Dickinson County

- Location within the state of Michigan Location within the United States
- Coordinates: 45°48′11″N 87°59′42″W
- Country: United States
- State: Michigan
- County: Dickinson
- Township: Breitung
- Settled: 1871

Area
  - Total: 1.59 sq mi (4.12 km^{2})
  - Land: 1.51 sq mi (3.90 km^{2})
  - Water: 0.085 sq mi (0.22 km^{2})
- Elevation: 1,040 ft (317 m)

Population (2020)
  - Total: 1,083
  - Density: 717.22/sq mi (276.92/km^{2})
- Time zone: UTC-6 (Central (CST))
  - Summer (DST): UTC-5 (CDT)
- ZIP code(s): 49876
- Area code: 906
- FIPS code: 26-66720
- GNIS feature ID: 0635571

Quinnesec is an unincorporated community and census-designated place (CDP) in Dickinson County in the U.S. state of Michigan. The population was 1,083 at the 2020 census. It is part of the Iron Mountain, MI–WI Micropolitan Statistical Area.

Quinnesec is in Breitung Charter Township on the Menominee River, which forms the boundary with Wisconsin. It is on U.S. Highway 2 about 3 miles (5 km) east of Iron Mountain and 3 miles (5 km) west of Norway at 45°48′23″N 87°59′18″W. The ZIP code is 49876.

== Geography ==
According to the United States Census Bureau, the CDP has a total area of 1.2 square miles (3.1 km^{2}), of which 1.1 square miles (2.8 km^{2}) is land and 0.077 square miles (0.2 km^{2}), or 7.12%, is water.

== Name ==
Quinnesec is a corruption of "Bekuenesec" (from the Ojibwe bekweneseg, meaning "smoky"), named after the Big and Little Quinnesec Falls, which were at one time known as Big and Little Bekuenesec Falls.

== Demographics ==
Historical population
Census	Pop.	Note	%±
2020	1,083		—
U.S. Decennial Census

As of the census of 2000, there were 1,187 people, 436 households, and 356 families residing in the CDP. The population density was 1,049.2 inhabitants per square mile (405.1/km^{2}). There were 453 housing units at an average density of 400.4 per square mile (154.6/km^{2}). The racial makeup of the CDP was 98.40% White, 0.51% Native American, 0.34% Asian, and 0.76% from two or more races. Hispanic or Latino of any race were 0.17% of the population.

There were 436 households, out of which 38.3% had children under the age of 18 living with them, 70.6% were married couples living together, 6.4% had a female householder with no husband present, and 18.3% were non-families. 14.4% of all households were made up of individuals, and 7.6% had someone living alone who was 65 years of age or older. The average household size was 2.71 and the average family size was 2.98.

In the CDP, the population was spread out, with 26.8% under the age of 18, 6.0% from 18 to 24, 31.0% from 25 to 44, 26.3% from 45 to 64, and 9.9% who were 65 years of age or older. The median age was 38 years. For every 100 females, there were 102.6 males. For every 100 females age 18 and over, there were 101.6 males.

The median income for a household in the CDP was $41,957, and the median income for a family was $44,291. Males had a median income of $32,931 versus $30,515 for females. The per capita income for the CDP was $17,139. About 1.9% of families and 2.7% of the population were below the poverty line, including none of those under age 18 and 5.0% of those age 65 or over.

== Notable people ==
- Edward B. McKenna (1883–1942), former Democratic member of the Michigan Senate (1933–1934).
- Richard Berlinski (1947–2024), American Football Player Michigan State Spartans football (1965–1968).
