= Edward B. McKenna =

American politician (1883–1942)

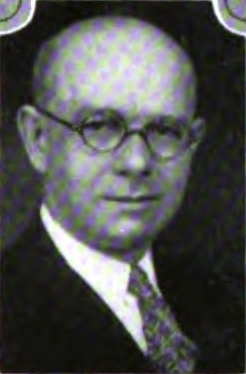
Edward B. McKenna

Edward B. McKenna (1883 – October 14, 1942) was a Democratic member of the Michigan Senate (1933–1934).

Born in Quinnesec, Michigan to a pioneer family, he attended the public schools and studied engineering at Michigan State University, where he played on the football and baseball teams, the former of which he captained in 1905. He also took a course specifically on engineering for mining at the University of Utah, entering the engineering trade after finishing school. He served in the Michigan Senate from 1933 to 1934, but suffered a paralytic stroke towards the end of his service, thereafter remaining an invalid until his death, in Detroit, in 1942.
