= Breitung Charter Township, Michigan =

Breitung Township, Michigan
- Charter township
- Charter Township of Breitung
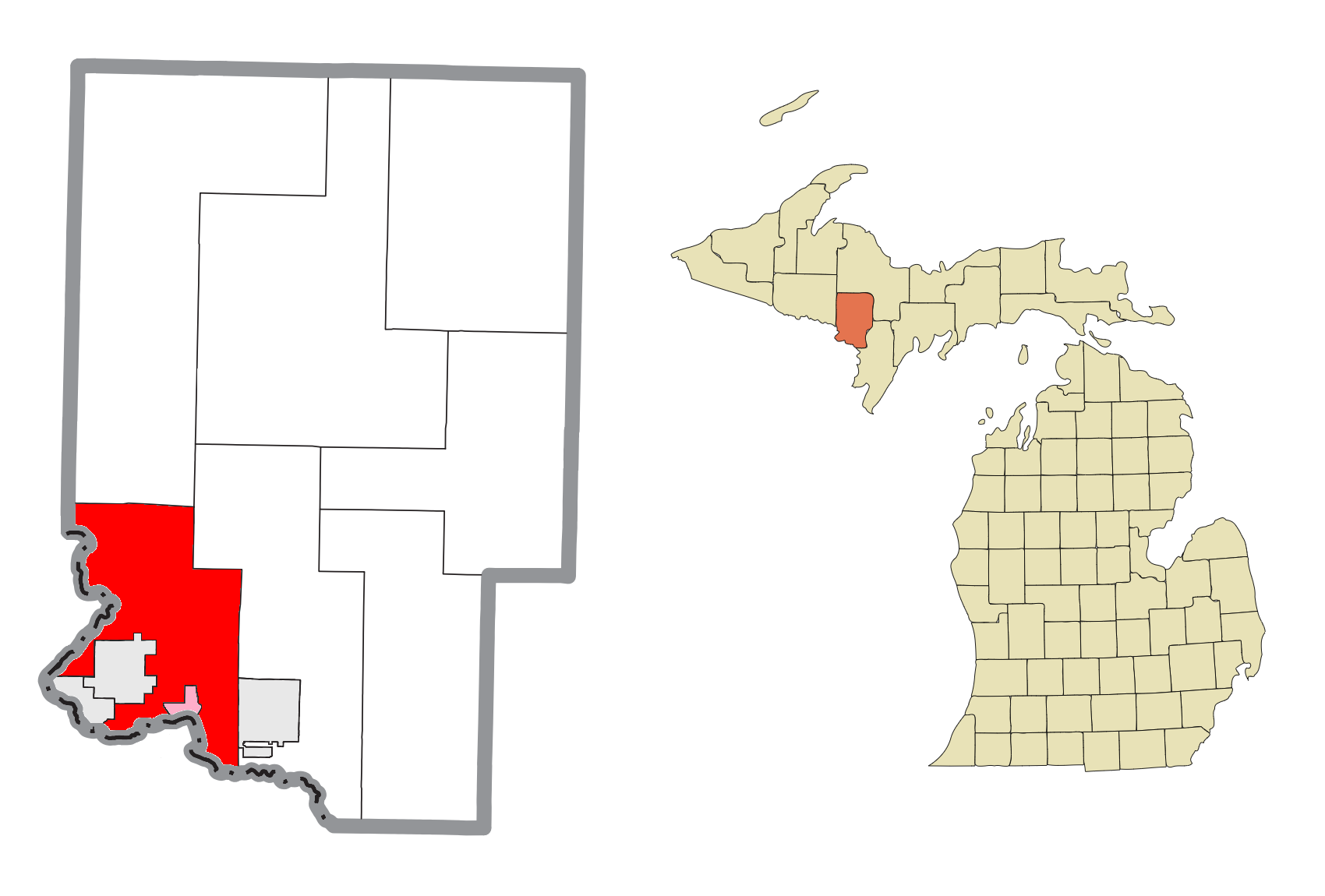
- Location within Dickinson County (red) and the administered CDP of Quinnesec (pink)

- Location within the state of Michigan Location within the United States
- Coordinates: 45°48′31″N 88°01′47″W
- Country: United States
- State: Michigan
- County: Dickinson
- Established: 1876

Government
  - Supervisor: Denny Olson
  - Clerk: Wendy Larson

Area
  - Total: 67.89 sq mi (175.83 km^{2})
  - Land: 64.27 sq mi (166.46 km^{2})
  - Water: 3.62 sq mi (9.38 km^{2})
- Elevation: 1,161 ft (354 m)

Population (2020)
  - Total: 5,831
  - Density: 91/sq mi (35.2/km^{2})
- Time zone: UTC-6 (Central (CST))
  - Summer (DST): UTC-5 (CDT)
- ZIP code(s): 49801 (Iron Mountain); 49802 (Kingsford); 49870 (Norway); 49876 (Quinnesec)
- Area code: 906
- FIPS code: 26-10220
- GNIS feature ID: 1625974
- Website: Official website

Breitung Charter Township (/braɪtɪŋ/ BRY-ting) is a charter township of Dickinson County in the U.S. state of Michigan. As of the 2020 census, the township population was 5,831.

== History ==
The township is named after Edward Breitung, a miner and U.S. Representative from Michigan.

== Geography ==
According to the United States Census Bureau, the township has a total area of 68.3 square miles (177 km^{2}), of which, 65.1 square miles (169 km^{2}) of it is land and 3.2 square miles (8.3 km^{2}) of it (4.70%) is water.

== Communities ==
- The cities of Iron Mountain and Kingsford are in the southwest of the township, but are administratively autonomous.
- East Kingsford is a part of the Kingsford urban area, located in the township just east of the city boundary at 45°47′42″N 88°03′52″W.
- Granite Bluff is an unincorporated community between Meriman and Randville at 45°56′22″N 88°03′13″W.
- Merriman is an unincorporated community on M-95 about seven miles north of Iron Mountain at 45°55′03″N 88°03′20″W
- Quinnesec is an unincorporated community, defined as a census-designated place in the township, just east of Kingsford and Iron Mountain.
- Skidmore is an unincorporated community.

== Demographics ==
Historical population
Census	Pop.	Note	%±
2000	5,930		—
2010	5,853		−1.3%
2020	5,831		−0.4%
U.S. Decennial Census

As of the census of 2000, there were 5,930 people, 2,354 households, and 1,727 families residing in the township. The population density was 91.1 inhabitants per square mile (35.2/km^{2}). There were 2,601 housing units at an average density of 40.0 per square mile (15.4/km^{2}). The racial makeup of the township was 98.35% White, 0.03% African American, 0.44% Native American, 0.47% Asian, 0.12% from other races, and 0.59% from two or more races. Hispanics or Latinos of any race were 0.44% of the population in 2000. By the 2020 census, its population was 5,831.
