= Skidmore, Michigan =

- Unincorporated community
- Location within Michigan
- Coordinates: 45°47′31″N 88°04′25″W
- Country: United States
- State: Michigan
- County: Dickinson
- Elevation: 1,079 ft (329 m)
- Time zone: UTC-6 (Central (CST))
  - Summer (DST): UTC-5 (CDT)
- Area code: 906
- GNIS feature ID: 638053

Skidmore is an unincorporated community in Breitung Township, Dickinson County, Michigan, United States.
