= M-95 (Michigan highway) =

State highway in Dickinson and Marquette counties in Michigan, United States

M-95
- Leif Erickson Memorial Highway
- M-95 highlighted in red

Route information
- Maintained by MDOT
- Length: 55.162 mi (88.775 km)
- Existed: 1934–present

Major junctions
- South end: CTH-N near Kingsford
- US 2 / US 141 in Iron Mountain; M-69 near Sagola
- North end: US 41 / M-28 in Humboldt

Location
- Country: United States
- State: Michigan
- Counties: Dickinson, Marquette

Highway system
- Michigan State Trunkline Highway System; Interstate; US; State; Byways
| ← M-94 | → I-96 |

M-95, designated the Leif Erickson Memorial Highway, is a state trunkline highway in the Upper Peninsula of the US state of Michigan. Running from Kingsford to near Champion in Humboldt Township, it is the main connection between Iron Mountain and Marquette along with US Highway 41 (US 41).

M-95 was previously designated as M-45. The number was switched when US 45 was designated in Michigan. The trunkline incorporates a portion of the former M-12 which became US 2. A section of the highway near Republic was turned over to Marquette County during a rerouting of the highway in the 1940s, becoming County Road 601.

== Route description ==
Starting on a bridge across the Menominee River, M-95 runs north along Carpenter Avenue in Kingsford. It turns east along Ludington Street in Iron Mountain and joins the US 2/US 141 concurrency out of town to the north, following Stephenson Avenue. Near the state line northwest of Iron Mountain, M-95 turns northward as a solo route through northern Dickinson County. There is a concurrency with M-69 from Randville to Sagola. Randville is just south of the junction with M-69 where the mining settlement formed because of the nearby Groveland Mine and was a station on the Milwaukee and Northern Railroad in 1880. A post office was in operation in Randville from 1891 until 1932.

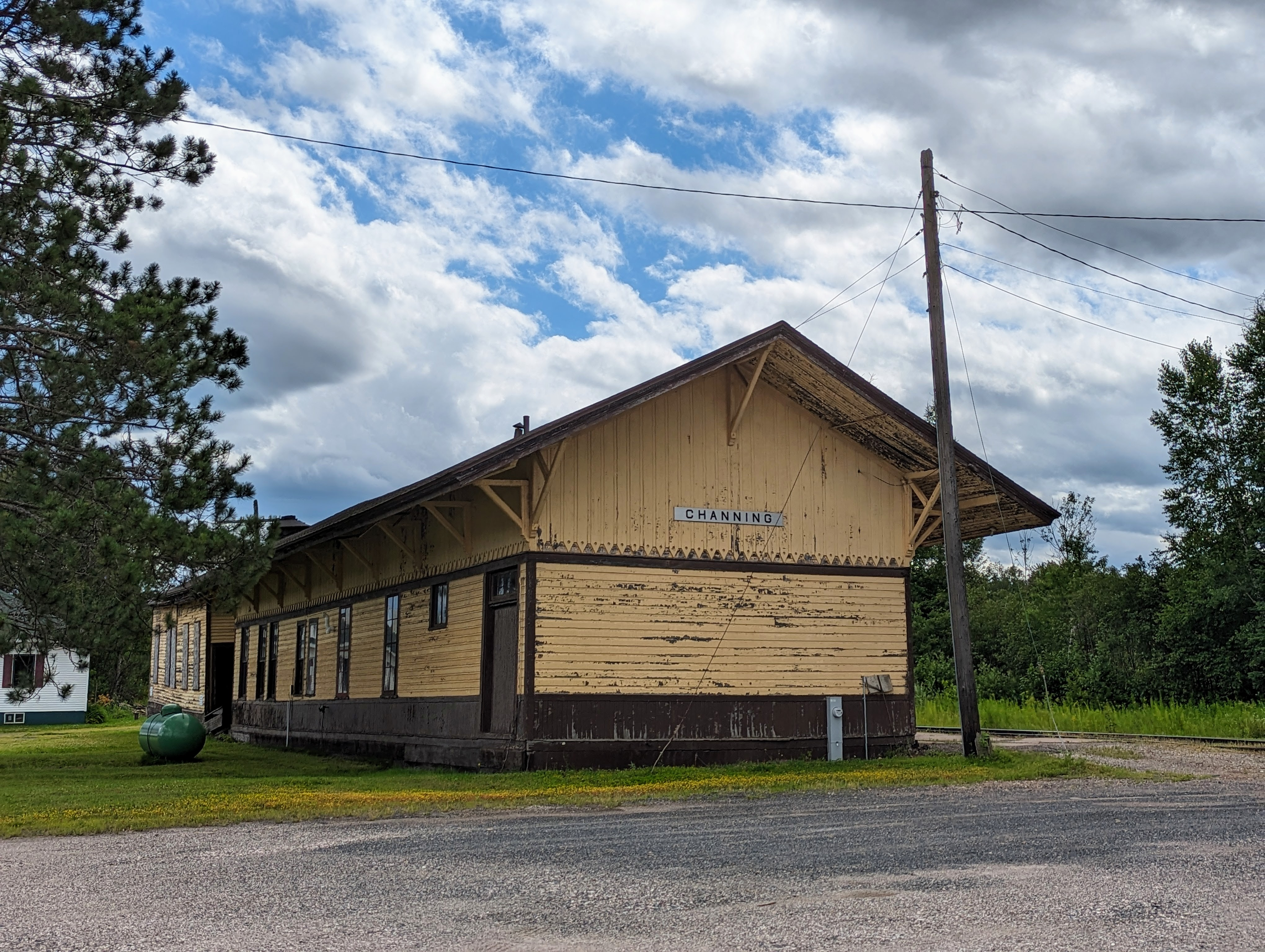
The Escanaba and Lake Superior Railroad railway depot in Channing.

Near Sagola is a mill owned by Louisiana-Pacific that makes oriented strand board (OSB). The surrounding forest lands near the highway provide trees for the mill. Sagola was formed, when in about 1885, five Chicago men formed the Sagola Lumber Company to harvest pine timber in the area. The name was derived from the local Indian word for "welcome". A post office was first established there in 1889. North of Sagola is the community of Channing which began as a railroad junction called "Fort Siding". In 1892, a post office was established named Channing, after John Parke Channing, a mining engineer who surveyed the area.

M-95 crosses the Michigamme River at the Marquette County line. It is here that M-95 also crosses over from the Central Time Zone to the Eastern Time Zone at the county line south of Witch Lake. From there it bypasses Republic and the former Republic Mine Complex to the west. Republic is divided into two smaller communities of North Republic and South Republic by the mine complex. Known for its sandy beachfront along the Michigamme River west of downtown North Republic, the beach is located just upstream of the Republic Dam. In South Republic is a roadside park maintained by the Michigan Department of Transportation (MDOT) that provides a picnic area and canoe access to the river. M-95 comes to an end north of a railroad crossing at an intersection with US 41/M-28 named "Koski's Korner".

== History ==
From its inception until 1934, M-95 held the M-45 designation. It was renumbered to avoid confusion with the then new US 45 designation in the Upper Peninsula. The original M-95 was an access route to Onaway State Park which was redesignated as M-211.

The original roadway that became today's M-95 started in Sagola and run northward to M-15 (today US 41/M-28). M-45 was extended by 1927 to replace portions of M-12 that were not used in US 2. It would later be extended in 1932 to the state line south of Kingsford. The total of M-45 was converted to M-95 in 1934 as a realignment near Witch Lake is completed.

M-95 was rerouted in 1942 from Republic north to Humboldt Township. This new seven-mile (11 km) section replaced the last section of gravel roadway that was transferred to Marquette County as County Road 601. Another rerouting in the Republic area moved the trunkline in 1957 to bypass South Republic. The former roadway was partially closed to become part of the Republic Mine. M-69 was shortened, eliminating the concurrency with M-95 in 1960 or 1961. M-69 was re-extended back to its pre-1960 routing in 1991, restoring the concurrency in the process.

== Major intersections ==
| County | Location | mi | km | Destinations | Notes |
|---|---|---|---|---|---|
| Dickinson | Breitung Township | 0.000 | 0.000 | To CTH-N – Aurora, Niagara | Wisconsin state line |
| Dickinson | Iron Mountain | 2.793 | 4.495 | US 2 east / US 141 south (Stephenson Avenue) – Escanaba | Southern end of US 2/US 141 concurrency |
| Dickinson | Breitung Township | 6.127 | 9.860 | US 2 west / US 141 north – Florence, Crystal Falls | Northern end of US 2/US 141 concurrency |
| Dickinson | Randville | 16.416 | 26.419 | M-69 east – Felch, Escanaba | Southern end of M-69 concurrency |
| Dickinson | Sagola | 22.372 | 36.004 | M-69 west – Crystal Falls | Northern end of M-69 concurrency |
| Marquette | Humboldt Township | 55.162 | 88.775 | US 41 / M-28 / LSCT – Baraga, Houghton, Marquette | |
1.000 mi = 1.609 km; 1.000 km = 0.621 mi: Concurrency terminus
