= Norway Township, Michigan =

- Civil township
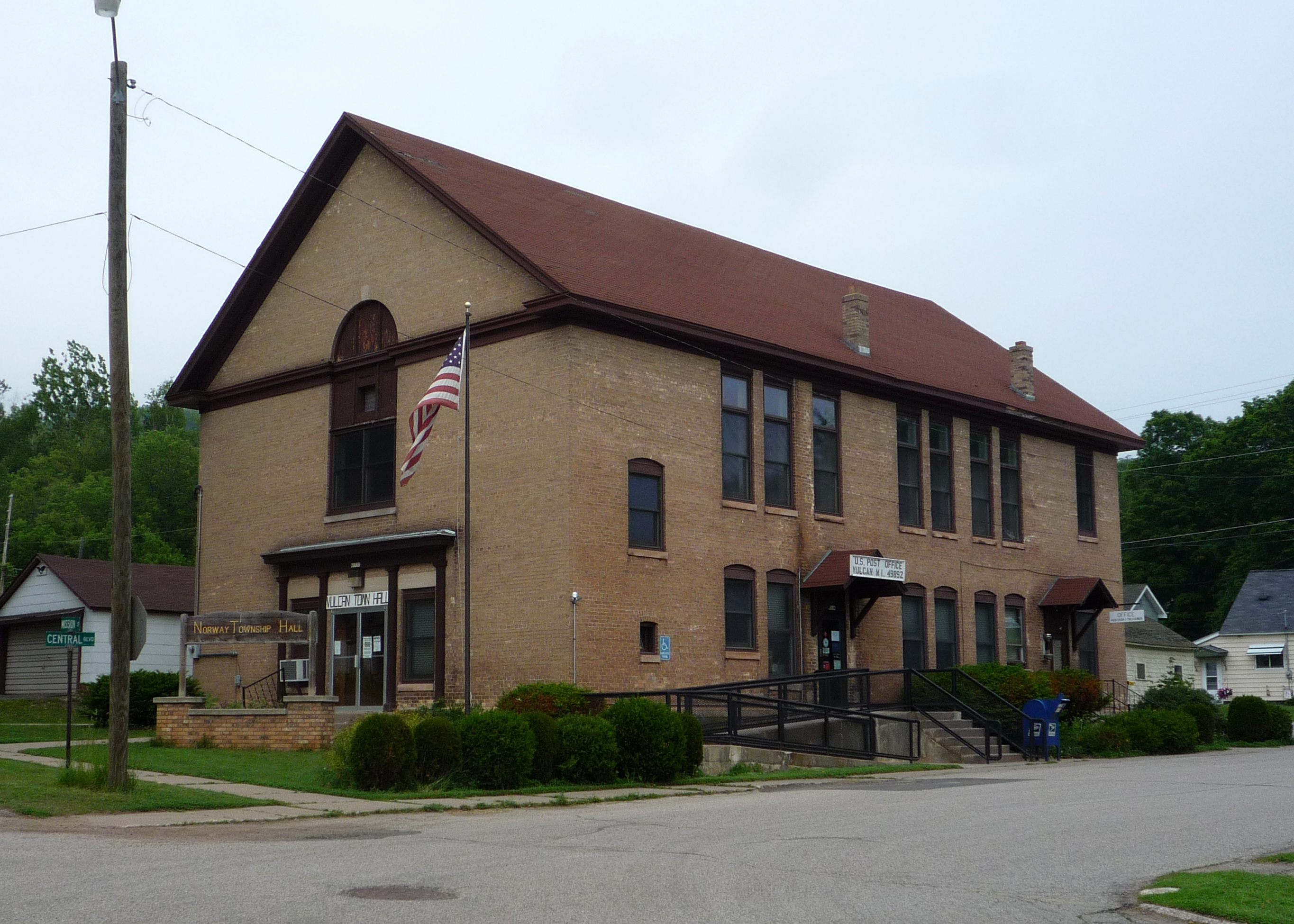
- Norway–Vulcan Town Hall and post office

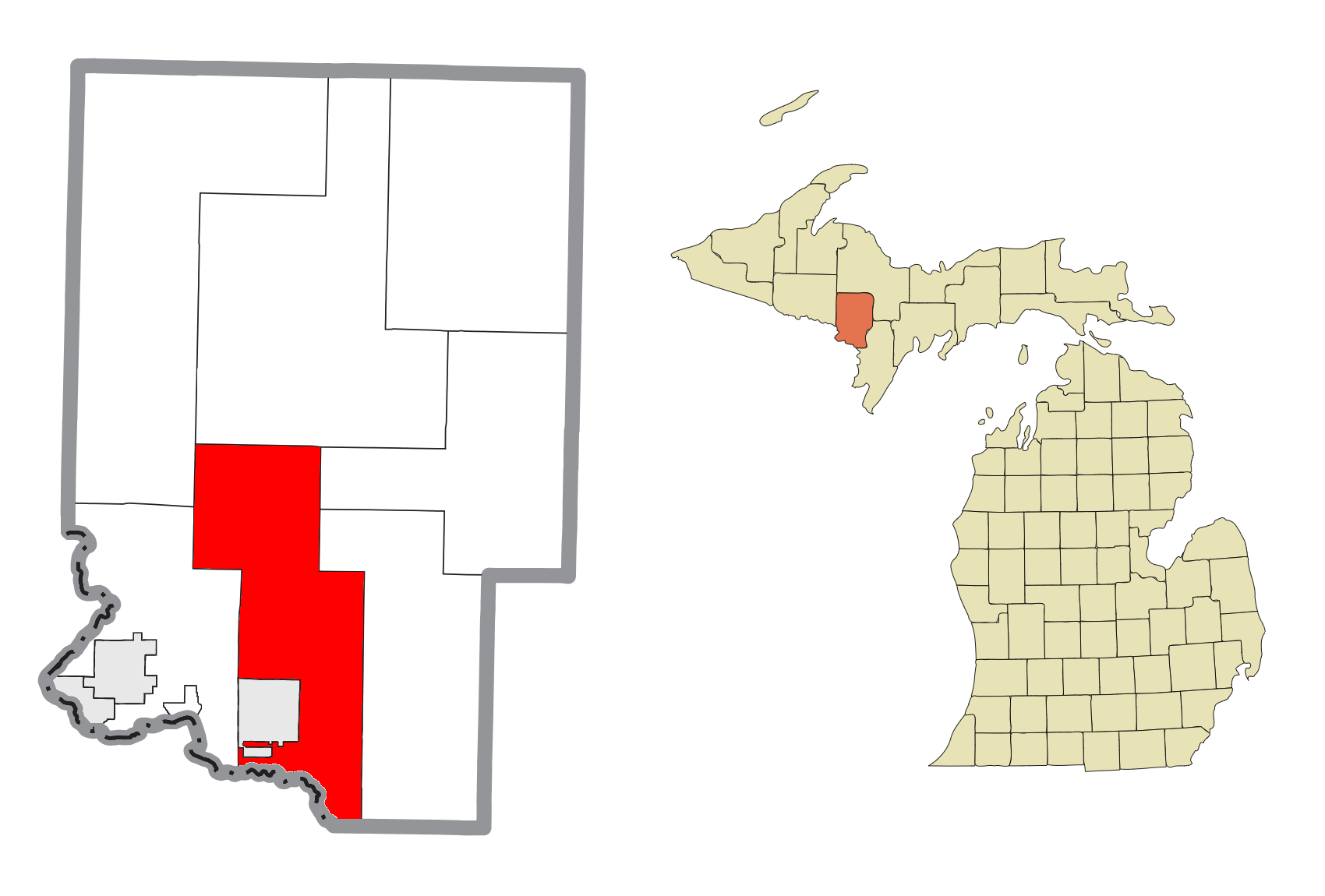
- Location within Dickinson County

- Location within the state of Michigan Location within the United States
- Coordinates: 45°49′24″N 87°53′21″W
- Country: United States
- State: Michigan
- County: Dickinson

Government
  - Supervisor: Don Byczek
  - Clerk: Joyce Giuliani

Area
  - Total: 90.71 sq mi (234.94 km^{2})
  - Land: 88.52 sq mi (229.27 km^{2})
  - Water: 2.19 sq mi (5.67 km^{2})
- Elevation: 1,053 ft (321 m)

Population (2020)
  - Total: 1,535
  - Density: 17.3/sq mi (6.7/km^{2})
- Time zone: UTC-6 (Central (CST))
  - Summer (DST): UTC-5 (CDT)
- ZIP code(s): 49801 (Iron Mountain); 49831 (Felch); 49834 (Foster City); 49852 (Loretto); 49870 (Norway); 49892 (Vulcan)
- Area code: 906
- FIPS code: 26-59240
- GNIS feature ID: 1626822
- Website: Official website

Norway Township is a civil township of Dickinson County in the U.S. state of Michigan. The population was 1,535 at the 2020 census.

== Geography ==
According to the United States Census Bureau, the township has a total area of 90.9 square miles (235 km^{2}), of which, 89.3 square miles (231 km^{2}) of it is land and 1.6 square miles (4.1 km^{2}) of it (1.77%) is water.

== Communities ==
Vulcan is an unincorporated community in Norway Township on U.S. Highway 2 about three miles east of the City of Norway at 45°46′50″N 87°51′45″W. The community was named after Vulcan, ancient Roman god of fire.

== Demographics ==
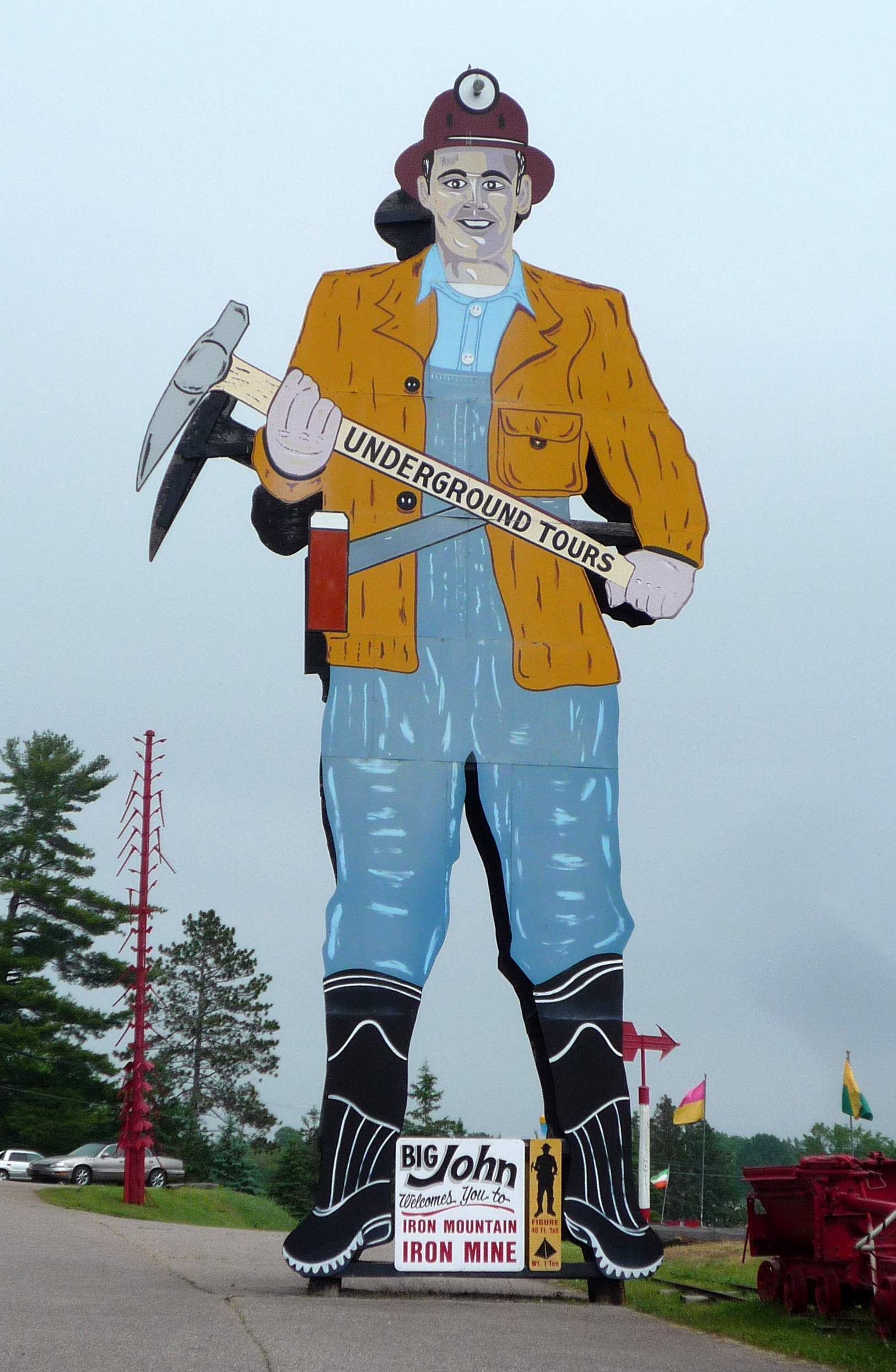
Big John, at the Iron Mountain Iron Mine, is a roadside attraction.

As of the census of 2000, there were 1,639 people, 630 households, and 468 families residing in the township. By 2020, its population was 1,535.

== Notable persons ==
- Charlotte Armstrong, mystery novelist and Edgar Award winner, was born in Vulcan.
- W. Glasson Coombe, architect, was born in Vulcan on December 30, 1909.
