= Dickinson County Courthouse and Jail =

- U.S. National Register of Historic Places
- Michigan State Historic Site
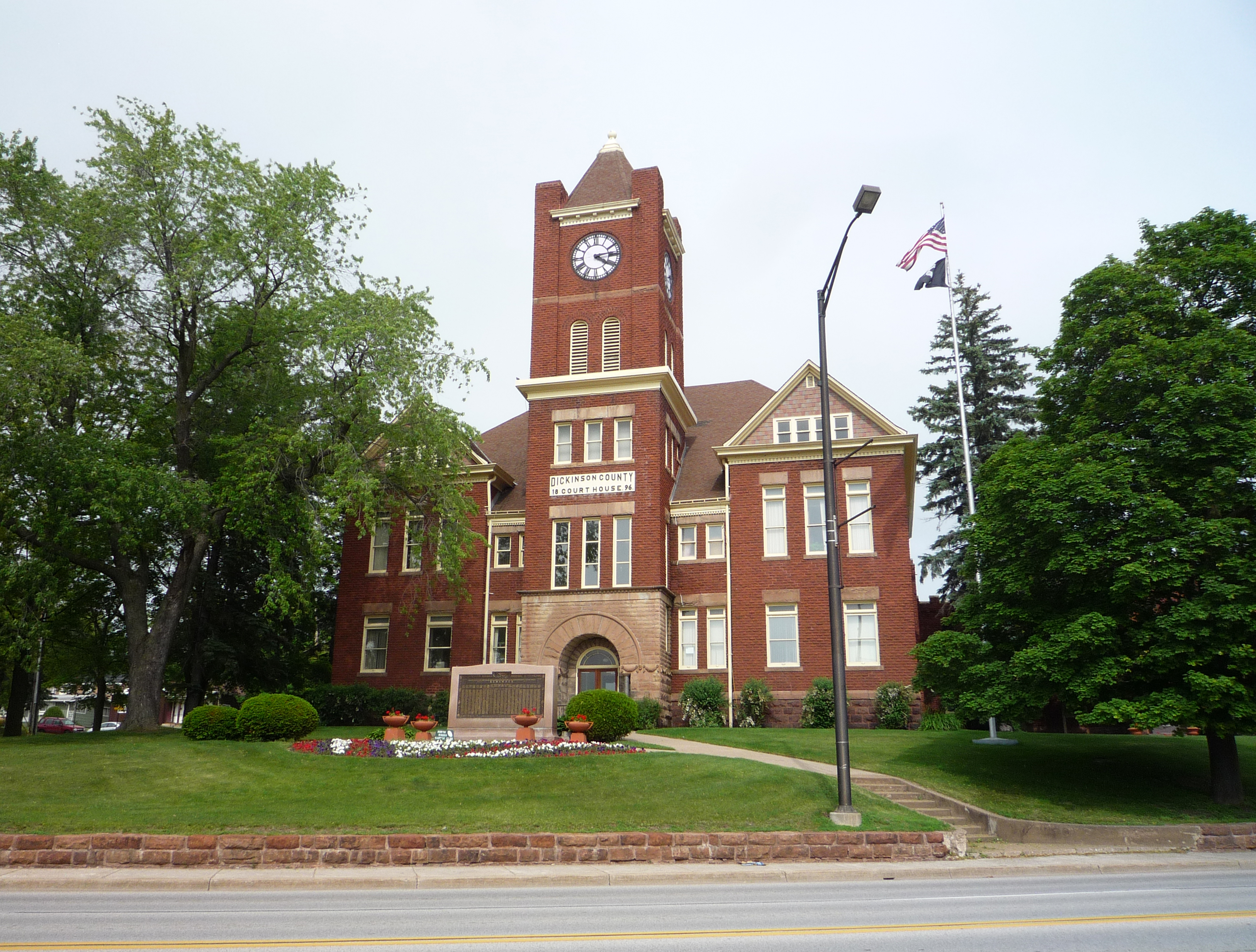
- Courthouse (jail behind trees)

- Location within Michigan Location within the United States
- Interactive map showing the location of Dickinson County Courthouse
- Location: 700 S. Stephenson Ave., Iron Mountain, Michigan
- Coordinates: 45°49′2″N 88°3′45″W
- Area: 5 acres (2.0 ha)
- Built: 1896
- Built by: E.E. Grip & Co.
- Architect: James E. Clancy
- Architectural style: Romanesque Revival
- NRHP reference No.: 80001852

Significant dates
- Added to NRHP: May 15, 1980
- Designated MSHS: November 7, 1977

The Dickinson County Courthouse and Jail is an historic complex of governmental buildings located at 700 South Stephenson Avenue in Iron Mountain, Michigan. On May 15, 1980, the complex was added to the National Register of Historic Places.

== History ==
Dickinson County was the last of Michigan's counties to be organized. This courthouse and the associated jail were built in 1896 from plans by architect James E. Clancy of Antigo, Wisconsin, a former Iron Mountain resident. It was built by E.E. Grip & Co. The building was renovated in 1935, adding sleeping rooms for jurors, and a two-story wing connecting the courthouse to the nearby jail. The clock in the courthouse tower was made by the Seth Thomas Clock Company in 1935; it was the last weight and pulley tower clock in the state. It was converted to electrical operation in the mid-1950s.

A new jail was constructed in 1975, and the old structure remained vacant and in disrepair until 1979. After a renovation, county offices moved in during 1982. A small single-story addition was constructed more recently.

== Description ==
The Dickinson County Courthouse is a 2-1/2 story Richardsonian Romanesque structure, built of red brick and Portage Entry sandstone. It has a slate hip roof and a square brick clock tower. The front facade contains a rounded arch entryway, supported by two granite columns. Dentiled stone decorates the cornice line. The interior has been extensively remodeled.

The medieval-inspired jail was designed to complement the courthouse. The jail is a rectangular, two-story structure built of red brick and sandstone, capped with stone battlemented parapets and a tin roof. It originally contained 36 cells, along with the sheriff's quarters.

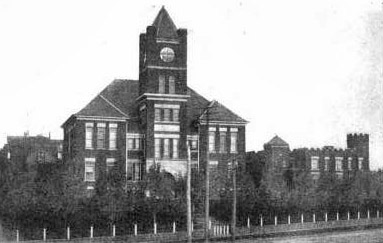
Dickinson County Courthouse, c. 1911

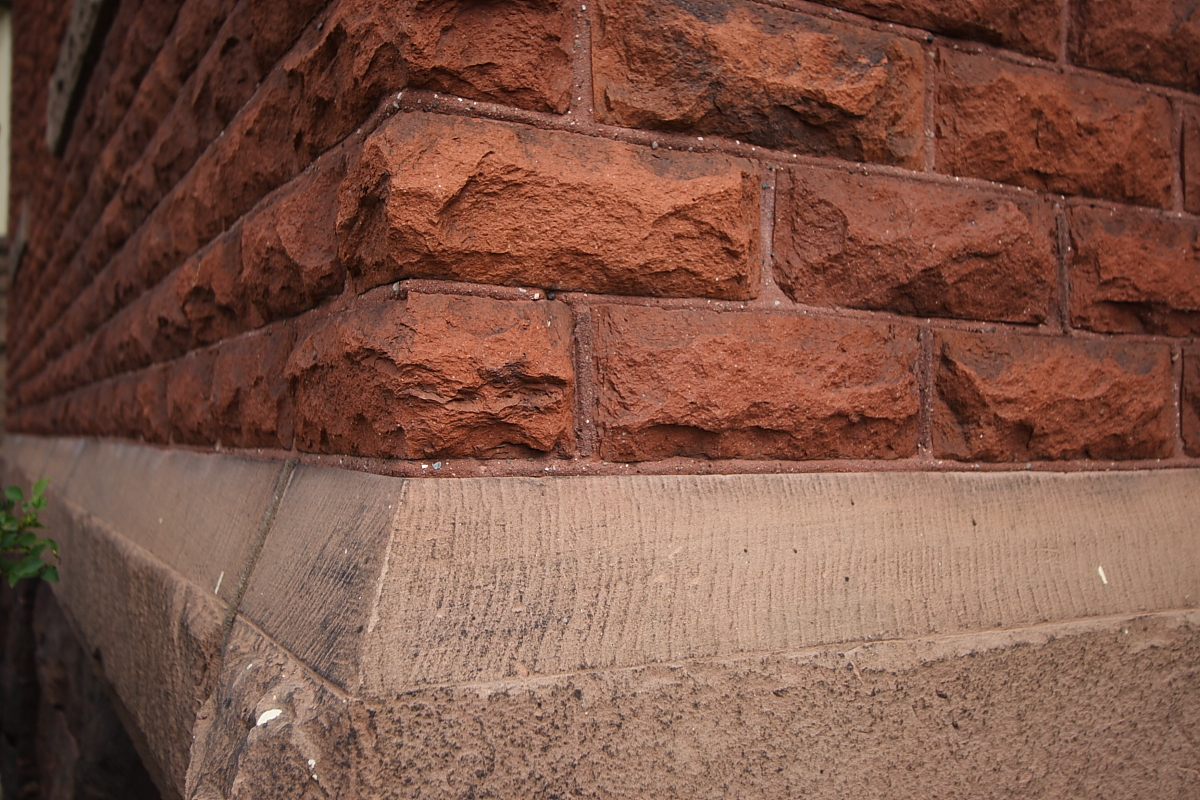
Brick detail
