= Sagola Township, Michigan =

- Civil township
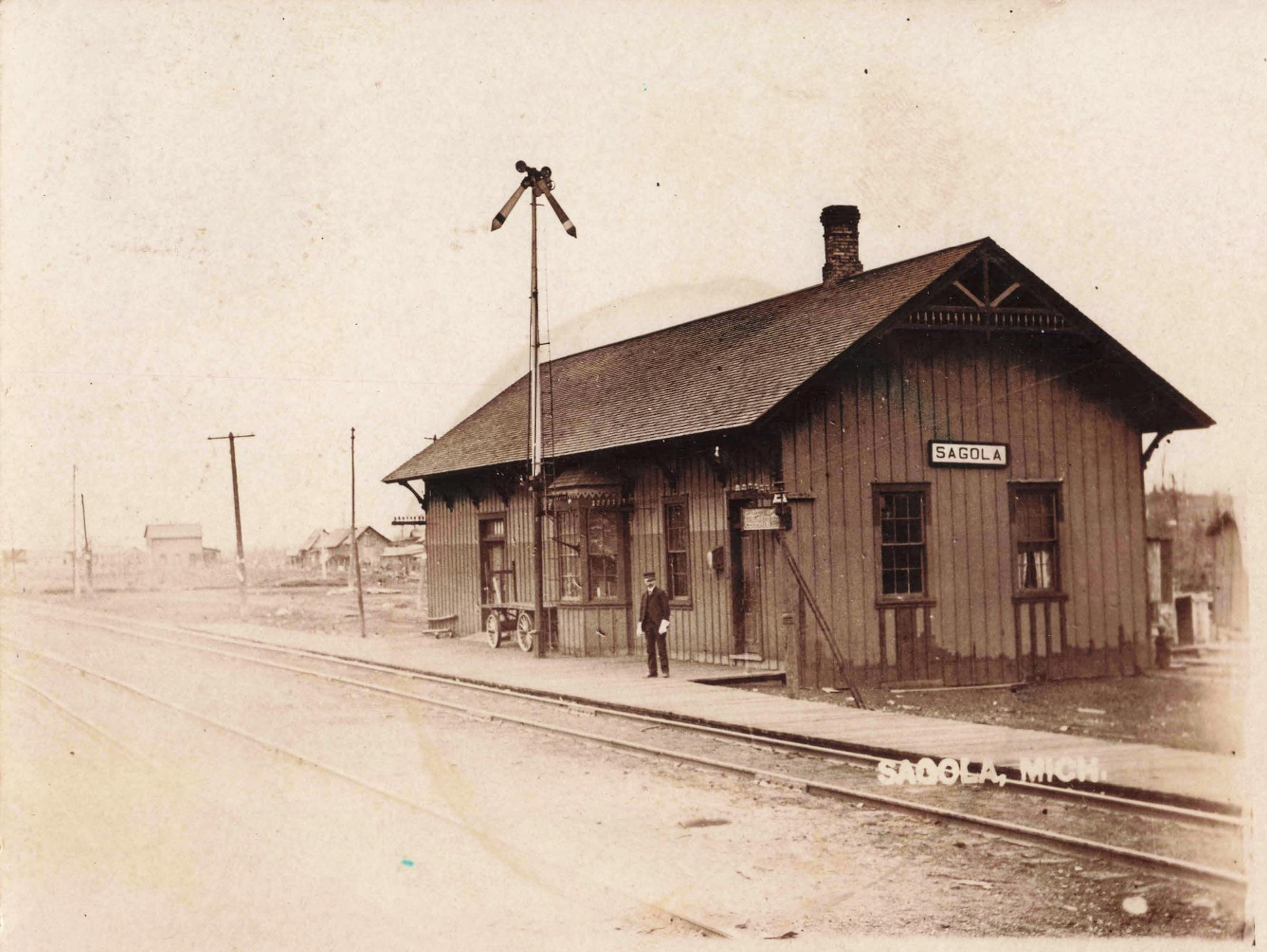
- Sagola depot, 1912

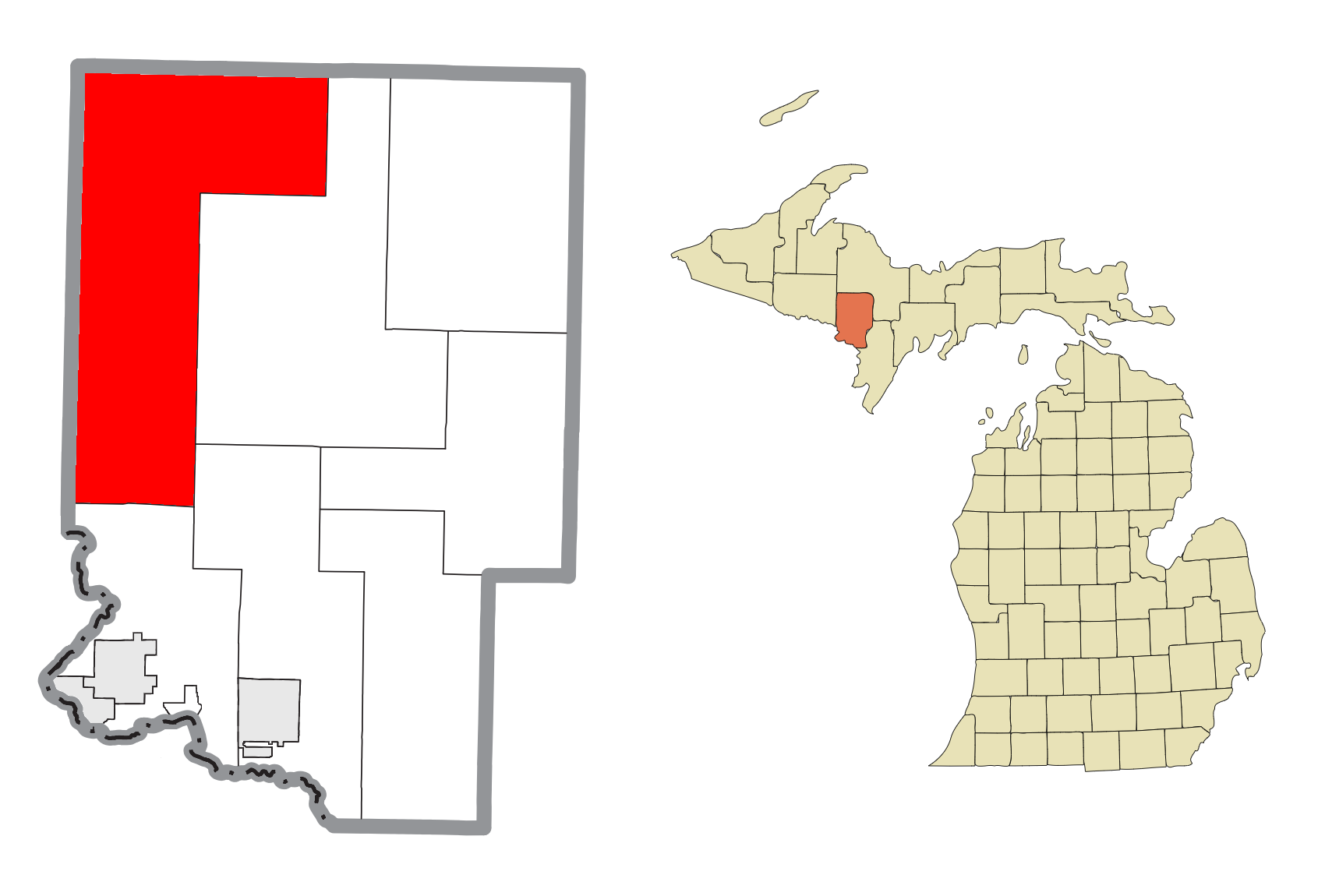
- Location within Dickinson County

- Location within the state of Michigan Location within the United States
- Coordinates: 46°07′57″N 88°03′13″W
- Country: United States
- State: Michigan
- County: Dickinson
- Established: 1887

Government
  - Supervisor: Donald Minerick
  - Clerk: Julie Roell

Area
  - Total: 162.75 sq mi (421.52 km^{2})
  - Land: 159.71 sq mi (413.65 km^{2})
  - Water: 3.04 sq mi (7.87 km^{2})
- Elevation: 1,355 ft (413 m)

Population (2020)
  - Total: 1,066
  - Density: 6.67/sq mi (2.58/km^{2})
- Time zone: UTC-6 (Central (CST))
  - Summer (DST): UTC-5 (CDT)
- ZIP code(s): 49815 (Channing); 49815 Floodwood; 49801 Randville; 49881 Sagola
- Area code: 906
- FIPS code: 26-70600
- GNIS feature ID: 1627022
- Website: Official website

Sagola Township is a civil township of Dickinson County in the U.S. state of Michigan. The population was 1,066 at the 2020 census.

== Geography ==
Much of the township is the Copper Country State Forest. The northwest portion is drained by the Michigamme River. A small portion of the northeast is drained by tributaries of the Escanaba River. The central portion is drained by the Ford River, and the south by the Sturgeon River. According to the United States Census Bureau, the township has a total area of 162.8 square miles (422 km^{2}), of which, 160.3 square miles (415 km^{2}) of it is land and 2.5 square miles (6.5 km^{2}) of it (1.55%) is water.

== Communities ==
There are no incorporated municipalities in the township. There are a few small unincorporated communities, all located along Michigan highway M-95. These communities, located directly along the Milwaukee and Northern Railway were developed by the Milwaukee Land Company as a result of land grants in the late Nineteenth Century. The first transaction on every deed for lots, names the Milwaukee Land Company as grantor.

=== Channing ===
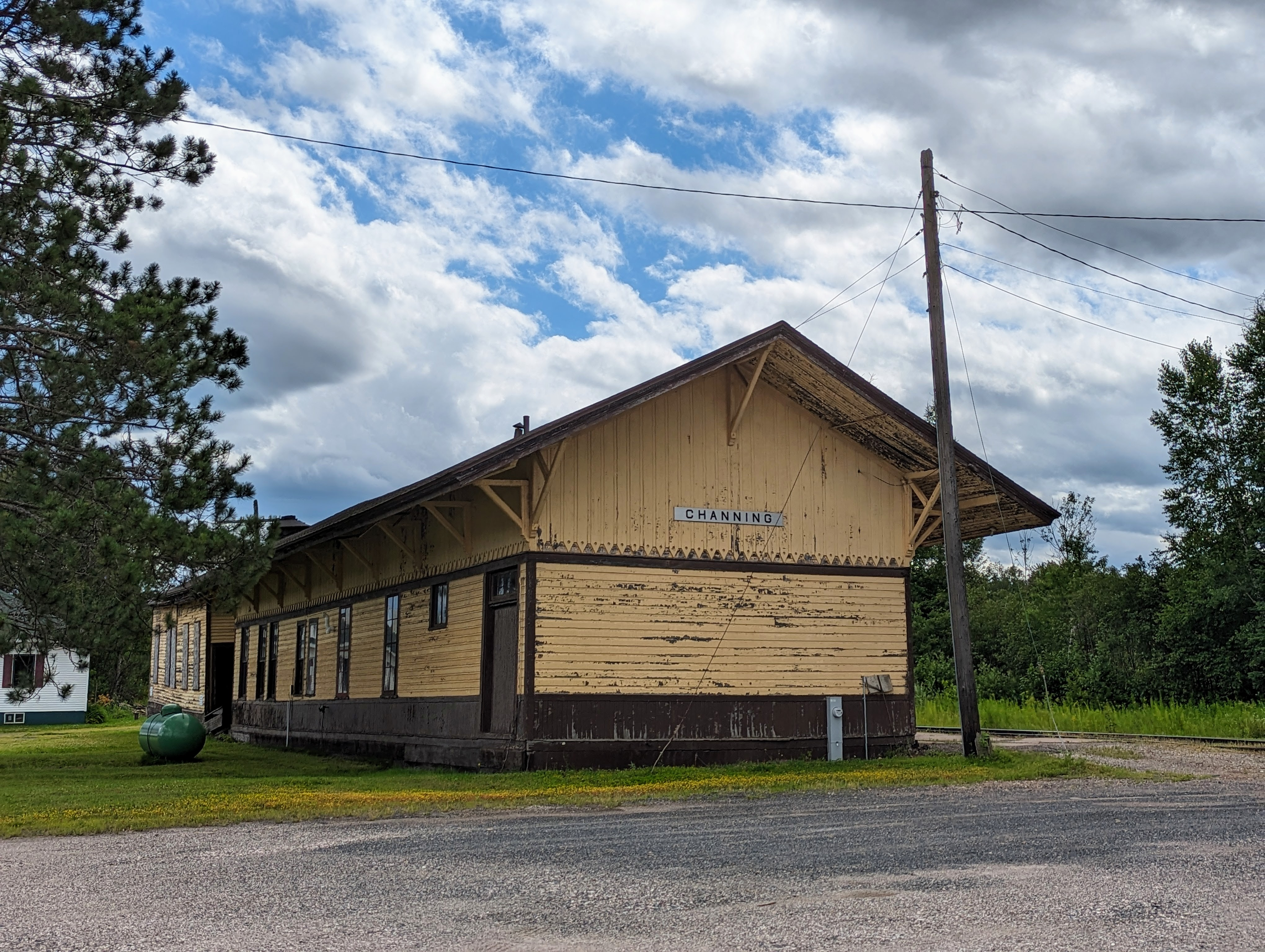
Channing depot, 2023

Channing began as a railroad junction called "Ford Siding". The community's name was changed to Channing, in honor of surveyor John Parke Channing, in November 1892. In 1892 a post office was established. This post office continues to serve ZIP code 49815. By the late 1960s, with few riders remaining and the US Postal rail contracts ended, the Milwaukee Road (and most other big RRs) discontinued many of their long-distance trains. After these passenger services ended, the Channing station continued to be used as a train order office for both the Escanaba and Lake Superior Railroad and the Milwaukee Road.

The Chippewa was discontinued on February 2, 1960. The Copper Country Limited made its last runs on March 7, 1968. There also were morning and evening trains to Crystal Falls and Iron River. All services to Crystal Falls and Iron River ended in 1969 when that branch from Kelso Junction (7.7 miles west of Channing) was abandoned.

=== Floodwood ===
Floodwood is on M-95 about five miles (8 km) north of Channing and two miles (3 km) south of the Marquette County boundary. It began as a lumber settlement on the Milwaukee and Northern Railroad. A post office was in operation there from 1887 until 1905.

=== Randville ===
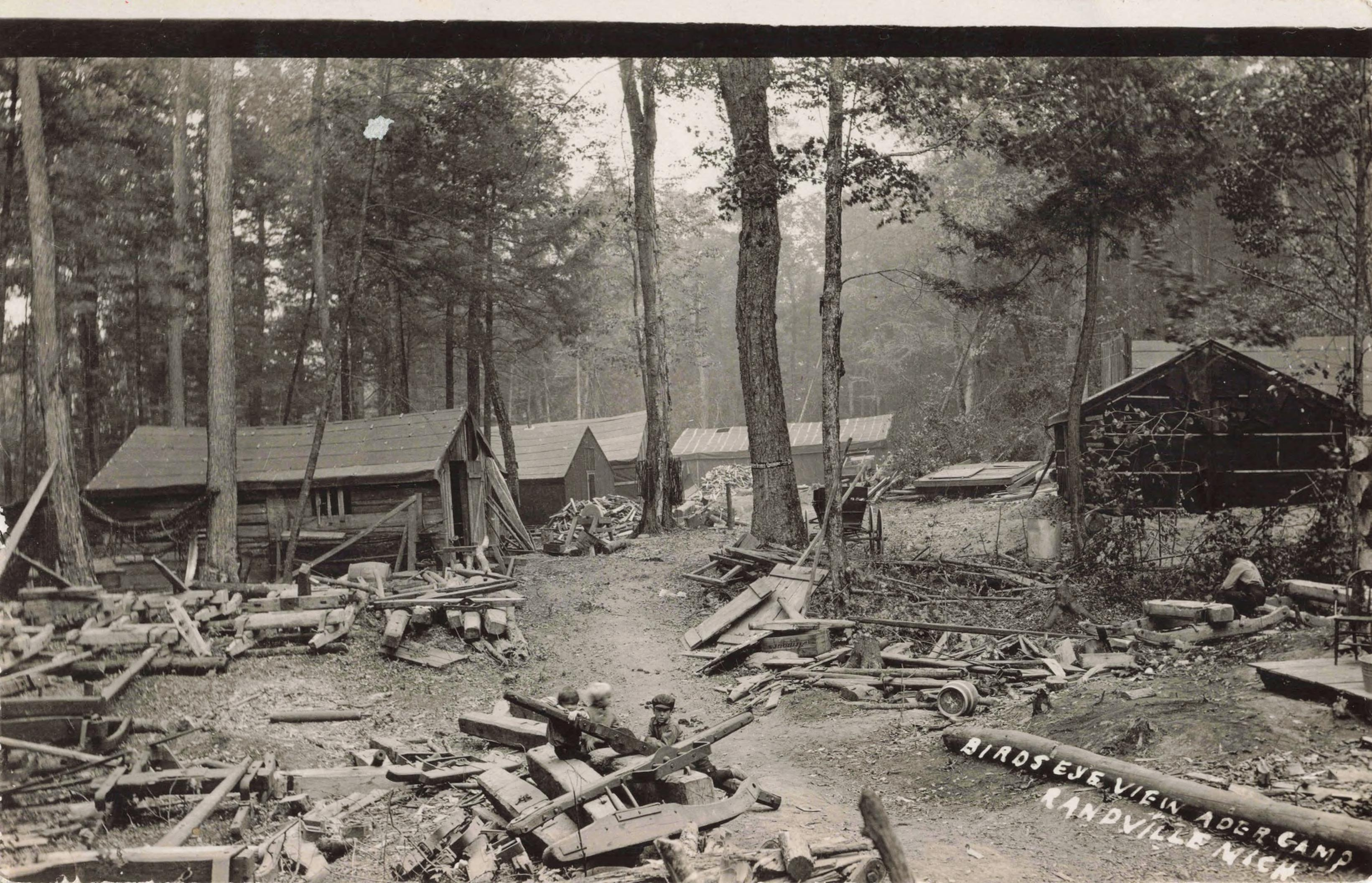
Lumber camp in Randville, 1909

Randville was originally a mining settlement, that was formed because of the nearby Groveland Mine. Randville was the location of a 4.5 mile spur to the Randville Mine between 1891 and 1913. It was a station on the Milwaukee and Northern Railroad (10 miles south of Channing) in 1880 and a post office was in operation there from 1891 until 1932.

=== Sagola ===
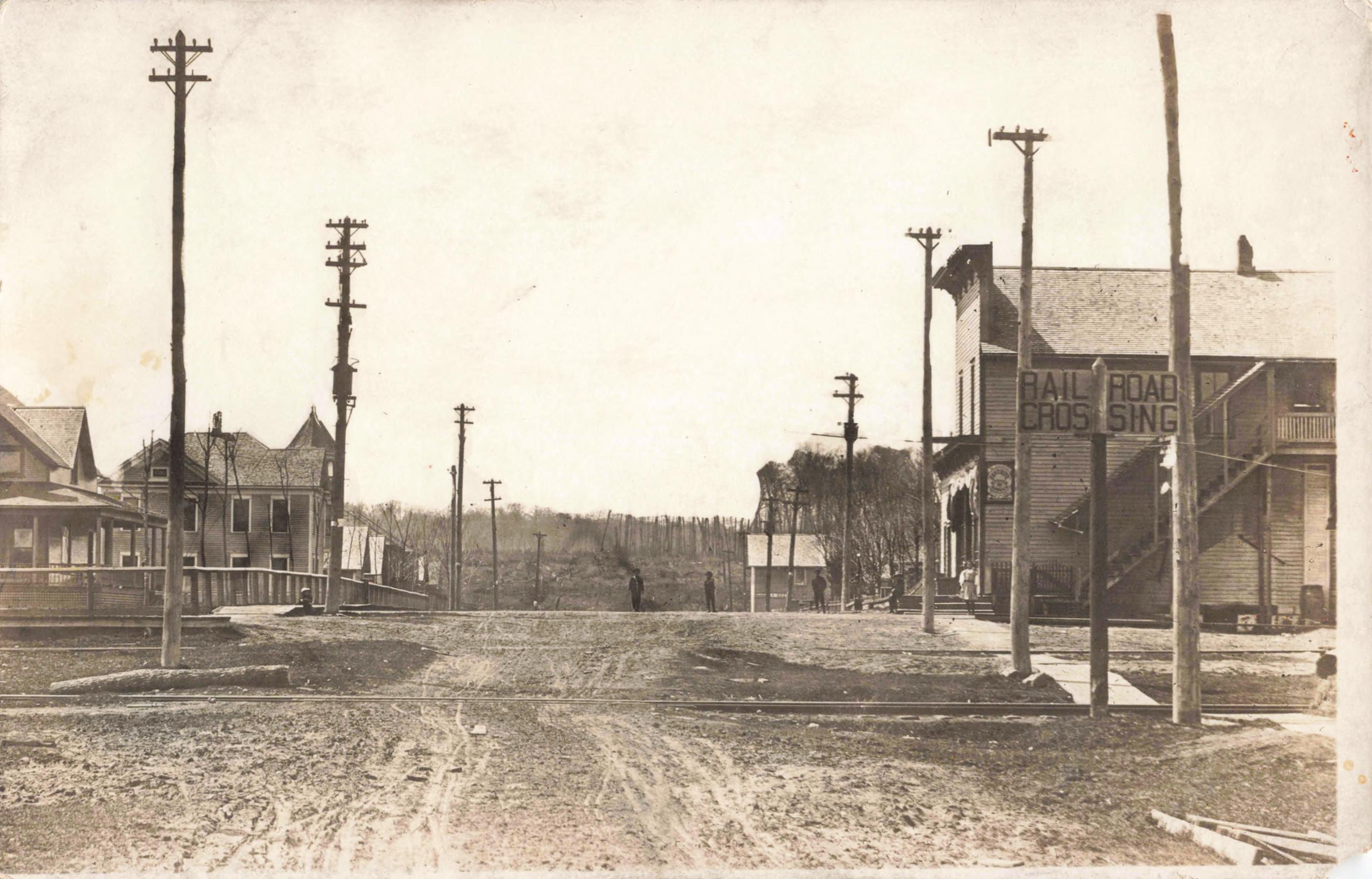
Sagola in 1910

Sagola was formed, when in about 1885, five Chicago men formed the Sagola Lumber Company to harvest pine timber in the area. The mill, which is now owned by Louisiana-Pacific had made oriented strand board (OSB) since 1988, and has since switched to LP® SmartSide® in 2023. The name Sagola was derived from the local Indian word for "welcome". A post office was first established there in 1889, and continues today to serve ZIP code 49881. Sagola is about five miles south of Channing.

== Demographics ==
As of the census of 2000, there were 1,169 people, 475 households, and 323 families residing in the township. In 2020, its population was 1,066. As of the 2010 Census the total population: 1,169, median age: 40 years old, total households: 475 and median household income: $33,333.

== Bibliography ==
- Scribbins, Jim (1970). The Hiawatha Story. Milwaukee, Wisconsin: Kalmbach Publishing Company. LCCN 70107874. OCLC 91468.
- Wiatrowski, Claude A. (2007). Railroads Across North America: An Illustrated History. St. Paul, MN: Voyageur Press. ISBN 978-0-7603-2976-4.
- Glischinski, Steve (2007). Regional Railroads of the Midwest. St. Paul, Minnesota: MBI Publishing. ISBN 978-0-7603-2351-9.
- Stevens, Viola (1977). A History of Channing, Michigan. Green Bay, WI: Adams Press. p. 5.
