= Norway, Michigan =

- City
- City of Norway
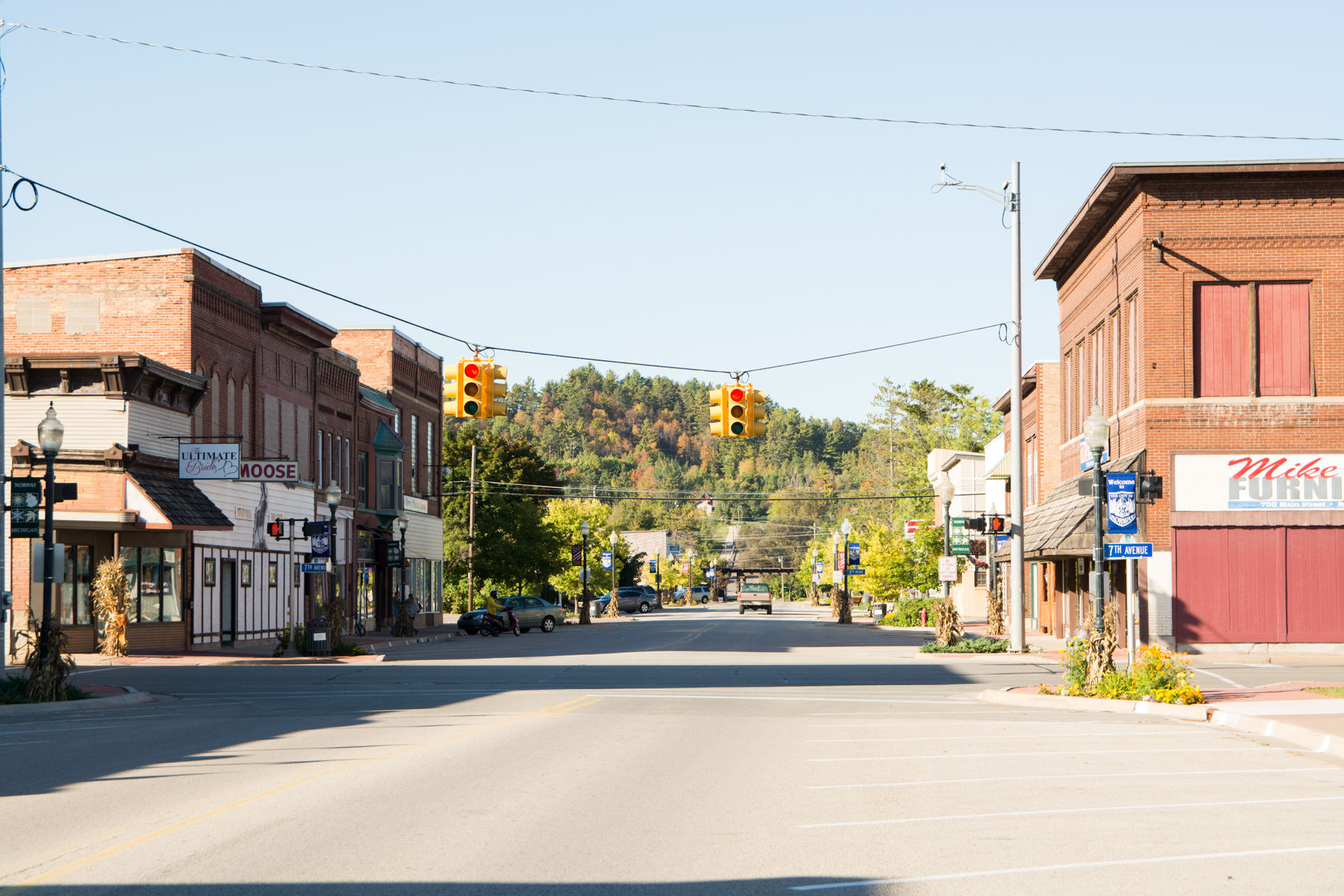
- Downtown at Main Street and U.S. Route 2

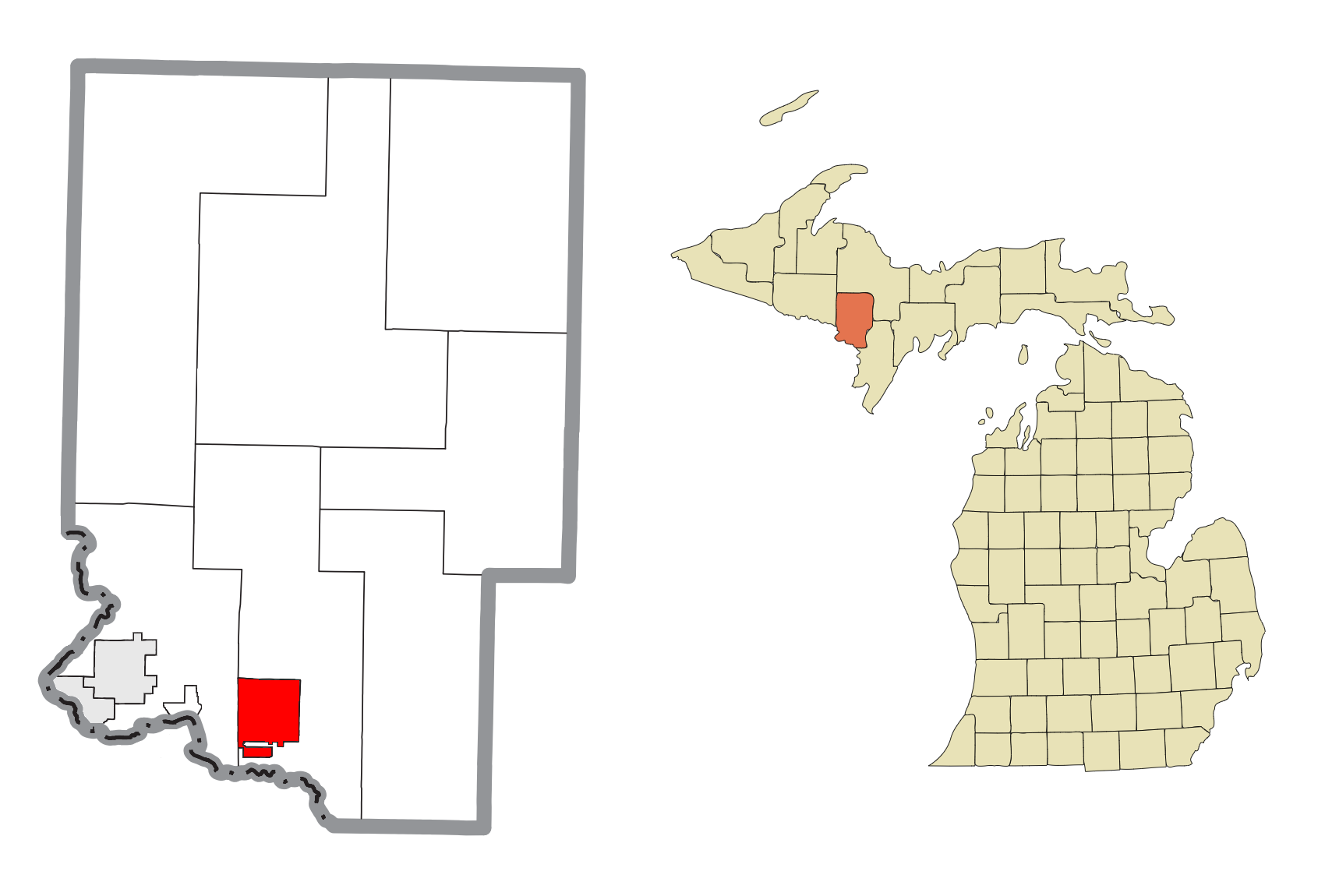
- Location within Dickinson County

- Location within the state of Michigan Location within the United States
- Coordinates: 45°47′21″N 87°54′16″W
- Country: United States
- State: Michigan
- County: Dickinson
- Settled: 1877
- Incorporated: 1891

Government
  - Type: Mayor–council
  - Mayor: Candy Brew
  - Manager: Dan Stoltman

Area
  - Total: 9.55 sq mi (24.73 km^{2})
  - Land: 9.46 sq mi (24.51 km^{2})
  - Water: 0.085 sq mi (0.22 km^{2})
- Elevation: 950 ft (290 m)

Population (2020)
  - Total: 2,840
  - Density: 300.21/sq mi (115.91/km^{2})
- Time zone: UTC−06:00 (Central (CST))
  - Summer (DST): UTC−05:00 (CDT)
- ZIP code(s): 49870
- Area code: 906
- FIPS code: 26-59220
- GNIS feature ID: 0633751
- Website: Official website

Norway is a city in Dickinson County in the U.S. state of Michigan. The population was 2,840 at the 2020 census. It is part of the Iron Mountain, MI–WI micropolitan statistical area.

The city is in the southwest of Norway Township, but is politically independent. It is on U.S. Highway 2 (US 2), which connects with M-95 about six miles (ten kilometers) west in Iron Mountain and with US 41 about 21 miles (34 kilometers) to the east. US 141 north merges with US 2 about four miles (six kilometers) west of the city. US 8 has its eastern terminus in the city and crosses the Menominee River to continue west in Wisconsin.

== History ==
A post office called Norway was established in 1891. The city was named from a forest of Norway pines near the original town site.

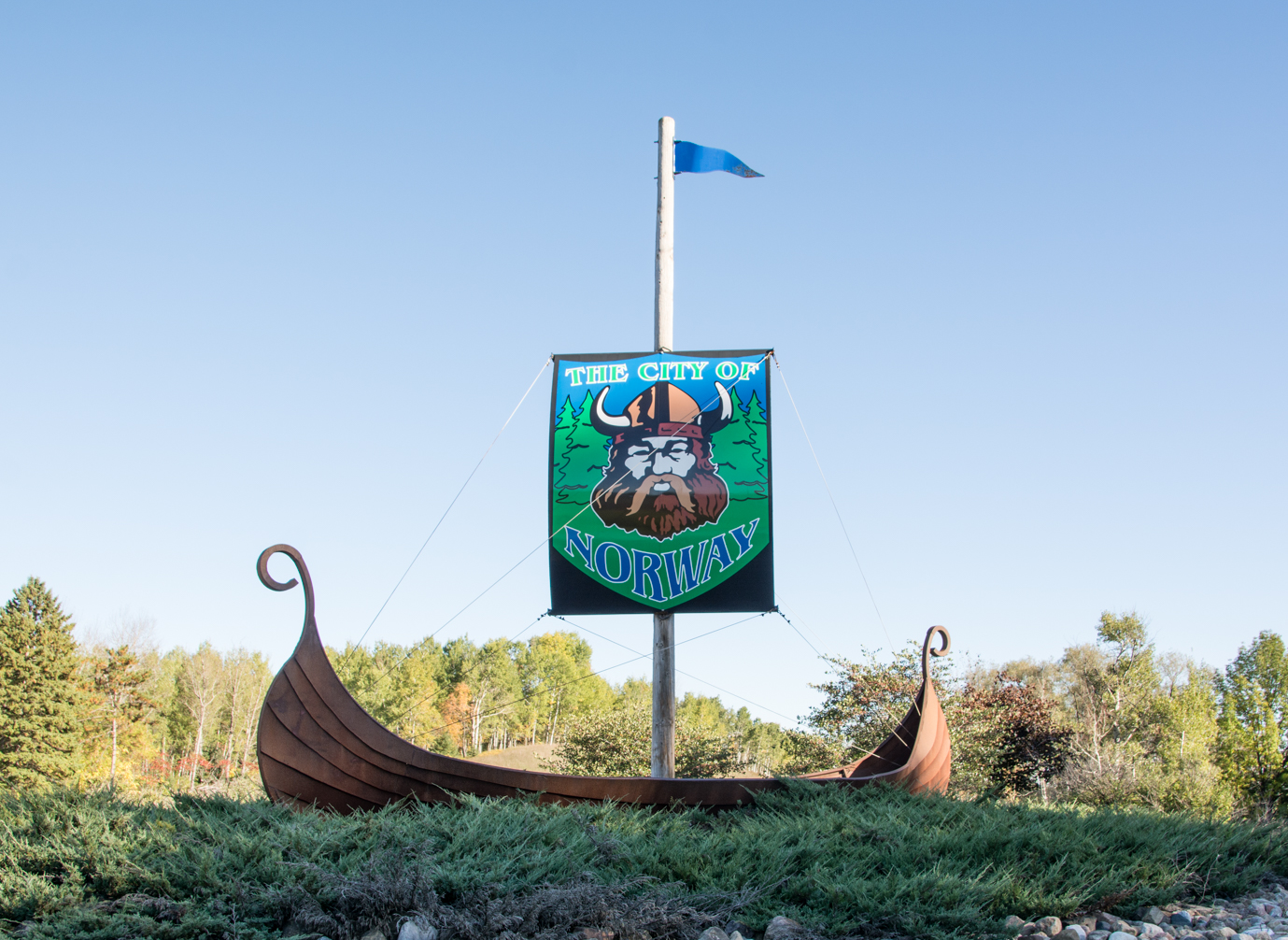
Welcome sign

== Geography ==
According to the United States Census Bureau, the city has a total area of 8.80 square miles (22.79 km^{2}), of which, 8.72 square miles (22.58 km^{2}) is land and 0.08 square miles (0.21 km^{2}) is water.

== Demographics ==
Historical population
Census	Pop.	Note	%±
1900	4,170		—
1910	4,974		19.3%
1920	4,533		−8.9%
1930	4,016		−11.4%
1940	3,728		−7.2%
1950	3,258		−12.6%
1960	3,171		−2.7%
1970	3,033		−4.4%
1980	2,919		−3.8%
1990	2,910		−0.3%
2000	2,959		1.7%
2010	2,845		−3.9%
2020	2,840		−0.2%
U.S. Decennial Census

=== 2020 census ===
As of the 2020 census, Norway had a population of 2,840. The median age was 43.4 years. 21.7% of residents were under the age of 18 and 21.3% of residents were 65 years of age or older. For every 100 females there were 104.8 males, and for every 100 females age 18 and over there were 99.8 males age 18 and over.

76.9% of residents lived in urban areas, while 23.1% lived in rural areas.

There were 1,254 households in Norway, of which 27.0% had children under the age of 18 living in them. Of all households, 41.8% were married-couple households, 22.6% were households with a male householder and no spouse or partner present, and 27.0% were households with a female householder and no spouse or partner present. About 34.1% of all households were made up of individuals and 16.3% had someone living alone who was 65 years of age or older.

There were 1,384 housing units, of which 9.4% were vacant. The homeowner vacancy rate was 2.5% and the rental vacancy rate was 7.0%.

Racial composition as of the 2020 census
Race	Number	Percent
White	2,707	95.3%
Black or African American	6	0.2%
American Indian and Alaska Native	20	0.7%
Asian	5	0.2%
Native Hawaiian and Other Pacific Islander	1	0.0%
Some other race	4	0.1%
Two or more races	97	3.4%
Hispanic or Latino (of any race)	42	1.5%

=== 2010 census ===
At the 2010 census there were 2,845 people in 1,256 households, including 765 families, in the city. The population density was 326.3 inhabitants per square mile (126.0/km^{2}). There were 1,402 housing units at an average density of 160.8 per square mile (62.1/km^{2}). The racial makup of the city was 97.4% White, 0.8% Native American, 0.2% Asian, 0.2% from other races, and 1.4% from two or more races. Hispanic or Latino of any race were 1.4%.

Of the 1,256 households 29.3% had children under the age of 18 living with them, 44.3% were married couples living together, 11.9% had a female householder with no husband present, 4.7% had a male householder with no wife present, and 39.1% were non-families. 34.2% of households were one person and 16.4% were one person aged 65 or older. The average household size was 2.25 and the average family size was 2.87.

The median age was 41.9 years. 23.5% of residents were under the age of 18; 6.8% were between the ages of 18 and 24; 23.7% were from 25 to 44; 27.4% were from 45 to 64; and 18.5% were 65 or older. The gender makeup of the city was 48.3% male and 51.7% female.

=== 2000 census ===
At the 2000 census there were 2,959 people in 1,288 households, including 812 families, in the city. The population density was 335.6 inhabitants per square mile (129.6/km^{2}). There were 1,392 housing units at an average density of 157.9 per square mile (61.0/km^{2}). The racial makup of the city was 97.53% White, 0.95% Native American, 0.07% Asian, 0.14% Pacific Islander, 0.24% from other races, and 1.08% from two or more races. Hispanic or Latino of any race were 0.78%. 18.7% were of Italian, 14.7% German, 10.0% French, 9.3% Polish, 7.5% Swedish, 7.1% English and 5.6% Irish ancestry according to Census 2000.

Of the 1,288 households 30.0% had children under the age of 18 living with them, 49.1% were married couples living together, 10.2% had a female householder with no husband present, and 36.9% were non-families. 33.0% of households were one person and 17.9% were one person aged 65 or older. The average household size was 2.30 and the average family size was 2.91.

The age distribution was 25.3% under the age of 18, 6.5% from 18 to 24, 28.4% from 25 to 44, 20.6% from 45 to 64, and 19.2% 65 or older. The median age was 39 years. For every 100 females, there were 90.7 males. For every 100 females age 18 and over, there were 86.9 males.

The median household income was $31,059 and the median family income was $37,533. Males had a median income of $31,595 versus $21,350 for females. The per capita income for the city was $17,681. About 7.5% of families and 10.8% of the population were below the poverty line, including 14.2% of those under age 18 and 10.1% of those age 65 or over.

== Transportation ==
=== Major highways ===
- US 2
- US 8
- Indian Trails provides daily intercity bus service between St. Ignace and Ironwood, Michigan.

=== Airport ===
Ford Airport (Iron Mountain) (KIMT) serves Norway, the county and surrounding communities with both scheduled commercial jet service and general aviation services.

== Notable people ==
- Richard C. Flannigan, Michigan Supreme Court chief justice
- John Ralston, NFL and NCAA football coach
- Rudy Rosatti, NFL lineman (Packers and Giants)
- Art Van Damme, jazz musician

== Points of interest ==
- Norway Speedway is a 1/3-mile paved American Speed Association member track.
- Piers Gorge is a 2.6 mile out and back trail located along the Michigan/Wisconsin border known for its whitewater rafting. It is part of the Menominee River State Recreation Area.
