= Breen Township, Michigan =

- Civil township
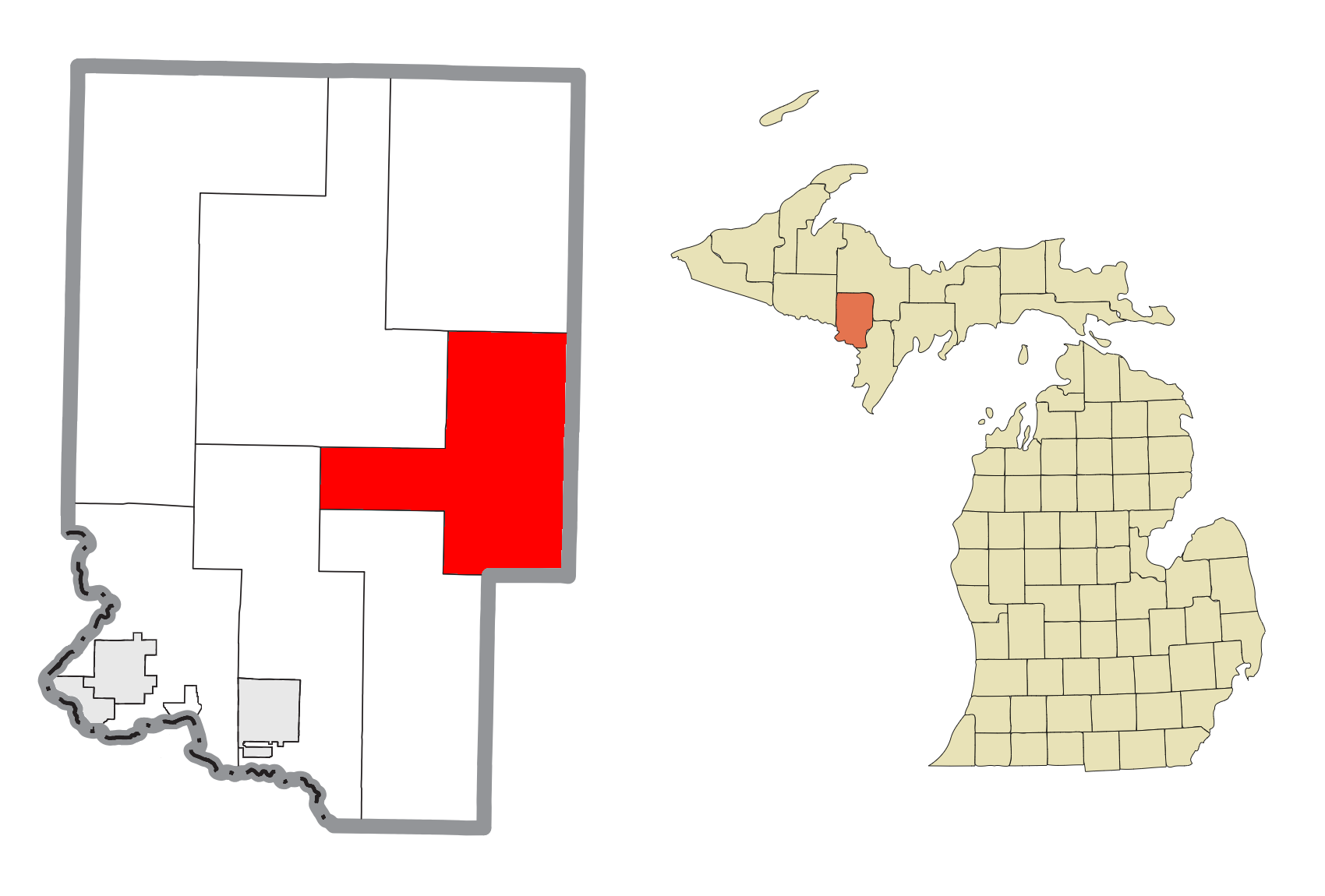
- Location within Dickinson County

- Location within the state of Michigan Location within the United States
- Coordinates: 45°57′47″N 87°43′42″W
- Country: United States
- State: Michigan
- County: Dickinson

Government
  - Supervisor: Benjamin Aho
  - Clerk: August Murray

Area
  - Total: 88.38 sq mi (228.90 km^{2})
  - Land: 86.69 sq mi (224.53 km^{2})
  - Water: 1.69 sq mi (4.38 km^{2})
- Elevation: 1,063 ft (324 m)

Population (2020)
  - Total: 471
  - Density: 5.43/sq mi (2.10/km^{2})
- Time zone: UTC-6 (Central (CST))
  - Summer (DST): UTC-5 (CDT)
- ZIP code(s): 49807 (Bark River); 49831 (Felch); 49834 (Foster City); 49873 (Perronville)
- Area code: 906
- FIPS code: 26-10200
- GNIS feature ID: 1625973
- Website: Official website

Breen Township is a civil township of Dickinson County in the U.S. state of Michigan. The population was 471 at the 2020 census.

== Geography ==
According to the United States Census Bureau, the township has a total area of 88.3 square miles (229 km^{2}), of which, 87.9 square miles (228 km^{2}) of it is land and 0.4 square miles (1.0 km^{2}) of it (0.46%) is water.

== Communities ==
There are no incorporated municipalities in the township.

- Foster City is an unincorporated community on M-69 and the east branch of the Sturgeon River at 45°57′48″N 87°44′38″W. It was a station on a branch of the Chicago and North Western Railway. The community was founded and named after Alonzo L. Foster, a lumberman. A post office was established in 1886 and continues to be served by ZIP Code 49834.
- Hardwood is an unincorporated community about two miles east of Foster City on M-69 and the east branch of the Sturgeon River at 45°57′42″N 87°41′28″W. It was a station on the Chicago and North Western Railway, named by its principal proprietors, the Menominee Hardwood & Shingle Company in 1884. A post office was in operation for several months in 1891. It is currently served by ZIP Code 49834 out of Foster City, Michigan .
- Hylas is a historic locale, located about three miles east of Hardwood on M-69. It was a station on the Chicago and North Western Railway, named by the railroad for Hylas from Greek mythology.

== Demographics ==
As of the census of 2000, there were 479 people, 201 households, and 144 families residing in the township. In 2020, its population was 471.
