= National Register of Historic Places listings in Iron County, Michigan =

Map of Michigan with Iron County highlighted

The following is a list of Registered Historic Places in Iron County, Michigan. The list includes 79 structures and historic districts that are significant for their architectural, historical, or industrial/economic importance.

== History ==
Iron County, originally part of Marquette County, was first surveyed in 1851. At that time, the area was populated almost exclusively by Native Americans from the Menominee and Ojibwe tribes. Although the original 1851 survey of the county noted the presence of iron ore, European settlers began arriving in numbers in 1875, prospecting for iron ore. In 1880, two important ore strikes were made: the first was by John Armstrong, who opened the Crystal Falls Mine along the Paint River, and the second was by Donald C. MacKinnon, who opened the Iron River (or Riverton) Mine along the Iron River. These two mines were the foundation of the two main population centers of the county, and the success of the mines brought more prospectors to the area, with 70 mines eventually producing ore in the county.

Logging also began in the county in 1875, and lumber mills were soon another important contributor the area's economy. Railroads, particularly the Chicago and North Western Railway, extended lines into the county to service the expanding mines. Lines to both Iron River and Crystal Falls were completed in 1882, and both settlements expanded rapidly.

Separate townships for Iron River and Crystal Falls, still under the auspices of Marquette County, were created in 1882. However, there was much local sentiment for establishing a new county for the area, and in 1885 Iron County was split from Marquette County.

At the time of Iron County's creation, Iron River, then the only incorporated village in the county, was designated the county seat. However, a bitter dispute over the location of county buildings immediately erupted between the geographically disparate east side, centered on Crystal Falls, and the west side, centered on Iron River. The dispute lasted until 1889, when a county-wide general election designated Crystal Falls as the county seat.

By 1890, there were nearly 4500 people living in Iron County, supported primarily by the mining and timber industries. However, the Panic of 1893 caused a depression in iron prices that lead to the closing of nearly all iron mines in the county and a severe curtailing of lumbering activities. County residents turned to agriculture to support themselves. The economy of the area rebounded around the turn of the century as major mining companies, such as the M. A. Hanna Company and Pickands, Mather and Company bought up smaller mines in the area. Logging of hardwoods began in the county around the same time, and a long period of sustained growth stretched until the Great Depression.

The population of the county crew substantially during this time, reaching 20,805 in 1930. A great many of the newcomers were immigrants from Ireland, Italy, Poland, Scandinavia, Scotland, and Wales. New villages were platted, primarily to house mine workers, including Alpha, Mineral Hills, Caspian, and Gaastra. Iron River, Crystal Falls, and Stambaugh were all expanded. To serve the new residents, an electric street car line was installed in 1906, and a number of public schools were built.

The Great Depression ended Iron County's economic boom. Iron mining in the county was completely halted, and lumbering was substantially reduced, leaving thousands of workers unemployed. Several federal government projects were funded in the county, including the Cooks Run Trout Feeding Station (built in 1933-34), the Pentoga Park Office and Bathhouse (built in 1936), and various Civilian Conservation Corps projects crafted by workers at Camp Gibbs (built in 1934).

The mining industry was temporarily revived by World War II, but mining declined steadily in the postwar years, with few mines lasting into the 1960s and the last iron mine in the county closing in 1979. Lumber, however, has remained a substantial economic enterprise in the area, employing thousands of people until the present day.

== Historic places ==
There are 80 listings on the National Register of Historic Places in Iron County, Michigan. These structures date primarily from Iron County's economic boom during the first two decades of the 20th century, although some structures date from the initial influx of residents soon after the 1880 start of intensive iron mining.

The first structure listed, in 1975, was the Iron County Courthouse, which is probably the most architecturally significant structure in the county. Nearly all the subsequent listings were submitted as part of the Iron County MRA, a 1983 Multiple Property Submission that attempted to collect the most historically and architecturally significant structures in the county. Seventy-two of the Iron County listings are part of this MRA, and one more property, Central School, was initially nominated as part of the MRA but actually listed separately, in 2008. Four more structures, all highway bridges, were listed as part of the Highway Bridges of Michigan Multiple Property Submission. Other than the Courthouse, only one structure on this list, the Chicago, Milwaukee and Saint Paul Railway Iron River Depot, was not associated with either of the Multiple Property Submissions.

This National Park Service list is complete through NPS recent listings posted November 21, 2025.

	Name on the Register	Image	Date listed	Location	City or town	Description
1	Alpha Public Buildings Historic Complex	Alpha Public Buildings Historic Complex	December 22, 1983 (#83003659)	404 Main St. 46°02′47″N 88°22′40″W	Alpha	The Alpha Public Buildings Historic Complex is a collection of three buildings – the village hall, the George F. Porter public school, and the water tower – prominently located on a single block in the center of Alpha. All three structures on the register were built in 1914 at the peak of Alpha's growth, and are typical of the civic buildings built in the Upper Peninsula in this time period. The water tower has been replaced with a modern structure.
2	Amasa Historic Business District	Amasa Historic Business District	December 22, 1983 (#83003660)	100, 200, and 300 blocks of Pine St. 46°13′58″N 88°26′54″W	Amasa	This historic district contains structures primarily built between 1890 and 1920. The district includes the township hall, a railroad depot, a church, four bars, a senior citizen's center, a lumber company office, three commercial structures, and one single-family residence. After local mines closed, growth in Amasa halted, and the historic district remains as it was in the early 20th century.
3	Bethany Lutheran Church	Bethany Lutheran Church	December 22, 1983 (#83003664)	184 Beechwood Rd. 46°09′34″N 88°45′42″W	Iron River	The Bethany Lutheran Church was originally organized in 1911 to serve the Swedish Lutheran population of Beechwood. Albert Sandgren, the co-owner of the nearby Beechwood Store, drew the plans for the church building. Volunteers from the congregation did most of the construction work, finishing in 1913. It is significant as a completely unaltered rural church built in the early 20th century.
4	Bewabic Park	Bewabic Park	April 19, 2016 (#16000179)	1933 West US 2; 46°05′25″N 88°25′56″W	Crystal Falls Township	Bewabic Park, located on the shore of Fortune Lake on US 2, was established by Iron County Road Commission engineer-manager Herbert F. Larson in 1923, and is one of America's first roadside parks. It contains a number of buildings and structures built by the CWA and CCC during the Great Depression.
5	Joseph Bowers House	Joseph Bowers House	December 22, 1983 (#83003665)	318 Hemlock Ave. 46°14′05″N 88°26′57″W	Amasa	This house was constructed in 1901, and is significant as a well-preserved example of typical miners housing constructed at the time. It is sided with clapboard and has a gable roof.
6	Isaac W. Byers House	Isaac W. Byers House	December 22, 1983 (#83003667)	5 N. 8th Ave. 46°05′16″N 88°38′50″W	Iron River	This house was constructed in approximately 1919 for Isaac W. Byers, a lawyer and one of the leading developers of the Iron River area. Byers and four associates, known as the "Big Five," founded the Iron Savings and Loan Association in 1905, and financed major portions of the development of Stambaugh, Iron River, and Caspian.
7	Camp Gibbs	Camp Gibbs	August 3, 1994 (#93001408)	129 Camp Gibbs Rd., Iron River Township, Ottawa National Forest; 46°12′04″N 88°42′19″W	Gibbs City	Camp Gibbs was built by the Civilian Conservation Corps in the latter half of 1935 on land purchased by the US from the Michigan Mineral Land Company. The camp was used from 1935 to 1941 as a Michigan Social Welfare Community Organization site to house workers employed in the forest. In 1967, the Iron County Sportsman Club purchased the camp. Camp Gibbs contains 16 single-story wood-frame, gable-roof buildings, plus the sites of three other buildings that have been demolished. Many buildings were originally used as barracks, but also include a kitchen, shower room, bakery, garages, and storage.
8	Caspian Community Center	Caspian Community Center	December 22, 1983 (#83003671)	404 Brady Ave. 46°03′43″N 88°37′39″W	Caspian	The Caspian Community Center is an Arts and Crafts style building constructed in 1921 by the Presbyterian Board of National Missions as an educational facility for immigrant families. It was later purchased by the Caspian Athletic Association, and was used as a community center until its demolition in 2022.
9	Caspian Mine Headframe	Caspian Mine Headframe	December 22, 1983 (#83003672)	North of Caspian Rd. 46°04′04″N 88°37′31″W	Caspian	The Caspian Mine opened in 1903, the second of three mines opened by the Verona Mining Company. The Caspian Mine was the most productive mine in the county from its opening in 1903 until its closing in 1937. The original headframe was wooden; the current structure was built as a replacement in 1920. The headframe is a 106 foot high steel-framed structure clad in corrugated steel siding. It is about 25 feet by 10 feet at the base and tapers to about 10 feet by 10 feet at the top.
10	Central School	Central School	July 3, 2008 (#08000584)	218 W. Cayuga St. 46°05′36″N 88°38′26″W	Iron River	The original section of Central School was designed by the Milwaukee firm of Van Ryn & DeGelleke and built in 1904-05. Two Dutch Colonial Revival wings were designed by John D. Chubb of Chicago and added in 1910-11. The building was used as a school until 1980, and was used for storage afterward. Recently, plans are in the works renovate it into an 18-unit cooperative housing.
11	Chicago, Milwaukee and Saint Paul Railway Iron River Depot	Chicago, Milwaukee and Saint Paul Railway Iron River Depot	May 30, 2007 (#07000479)	50 4th Ave. 46°05′18″N 88°38′31″W	Iron River	This depot was built by the Chicago, Milwaukee, St. Paul and Pacific Railroad in 1913, when the railroad extended a branch line into Iron River. Passenger service continued at the station until 1945. The station is significant as the last remaining railway station in Iron River.
12	Chicagon Mine Road – Chicagon Creek Bridge	Chicagon Mine Road – Chicagon Creek Bridge	December 17, 1999 (#99001521)	Chicagon Mine Rd. over Chicagon Creek; 46°05′43″N 88°30′31″W	Bates Township	This bridge was built in 1910, likely for the Iron County Road Commission. This bridge is a notable early example of a concrete slab bridge from the era before the standardization of bridge design by the Michigan State Highway Department.
13	Cloverland Hotel	Cloverland Hotel	December 22, 1983 (#83003673)	423 3rd St. 46°05′31″N 88°38′30″W	Iron River	The Cloverland Hotel was a 3 1/2-story brick structure, built to resemble an old English pub. Inside, the right-hand storefront contained the Art Moderne Cloverland Bar. It opened in about 1922, with Henry Oberdorfer as the original proprietor. The building, located just north of an alleyway on the west side of 3rd Ave., was closed for a number of years, and a governmental downtown blueprint published in 2006 recommended either renovating or demolishing it. They chose the latter, which was completed in 2008.
14	Frank W. Cole House	Frank W. Cole House	December 22, 1983 (#83003674)	121 3rd St. 46°05′42″N 88°19′51″W	Crystal Falls	This simple, unpretentious, two-story house covered with clapboard was constructed circa 1899 for druggist Frank W. Cole. The house is missing and presumed demolished.
15	Cooks Run Trout Feeding Station	Cooks Run Trout Feeding Station	December 22, 1983 (#83003675)	180 Cooks Run Rd. 46°09′18″N 88°53′32″W	Stambaugh	The Cooks Run Trout Feeding Station is a small trout hatchery, consisting of a pond, dam, and several buildings. The most significant building is the caretaker's cabin, which is notable as an outstanding example of vernacular wilderness camp architecture, with finely crafted details and using local building materials.
16	Courthouse Residential Historic District	Courthouse Residential Historic District	December 29, 1983 (#83003676)	Roughly bounded by Crystal and Michigan Aves., Iron and 5th Sts. 46°05′46″N 88°20′12″W	Crystal Falls	The Courthouse Residential Historic District includes the Iron County Courthouse and most of the finest houses in Crystal Falls, built primarily at the peak of the mining and lumbering industries for mining officials, lumbermen, and other businessmen and professionals of Crystal City.
17	Crystal Falls Dam and Power Plant	Crystal Falls Dam and Power Plant	December 22, 1983 (#83003678)	Pine St. 46°06′22″N 88°20′05″W	Crystal Falls	The section of the Paint River where the dam is now located was once a series of falls and rapids that gave Crystal Falls its name. However, in 1891, the village of Crystal Falls constructed this dam and power plant, effectively submerging the rapids. The plant was expanded several times, but could not keep up with demand from the growing population of Crystal Falls. The plant is still operational, providing roughly 1/3 of the power to Crystal Falls, and is likely the oldest hydro-electric plant still in operation in the Upper Peninsula.
18	Crystal Inn	Crystal Inn	December 22, 1983 (#83003680)	400 Superior Ave. 46°05′49″N 88°19′59″W	Crystal Falls	The Crystal Inn, also known as Crystal Manor or the Crystal View Apartments, was built in 1922 as a hotel on the site of the 1882 Lockwood Hotel. It was operated as a hotel until 1963, when it was remodeled as a home for the aged. The home closed in 1998, and the building remained vacant until 2010, when the building was renovated into a 25-unit apartment with commercial space.
19	Ernest Diele House	Ernest Diele House	December 22, 1983 (#83003682)	213 Marquette Ave. 46°05′44″N 88°19′50″W	Crystal Falls	This two-story American foursquare house built for Ernest Diele, the head mason of the Corrigan-McInney Mining Company. It is typical of the plain but substantial houses which managers and skilled tradesmen working in the local mining industry lived in.
20	Dober Mining Company House	Dober Mining Company House	December 22, 1983 (#83003681)	1 19th St. 46°04′22″N 88°37′46″W	Caspian	The Dober Mining Company House is a four-family house built around 1910 to house families of the company's miners. The house is a two-story structure, gable-roofed and sided with clapboard, and is divided into four side-by-side units.
21	Rudolf Ericson House	Rudolf Ericson House	December 22, 1983 (#83003687)	626 W. Boyington St. 46°05′24″N 88°38′47″W	Iron River	This house is distinctive in its embrace of the "English cottage style," rare in Iron County. It was built in 1937 for Rudolf Ericson, the general superintendent of the Davidson Ore Mining Company properties in Mineral Hills. Ericson was widely respected for his experience as an underground engineer, and was frequently consulted by other mining companies in the Upper Peninsula.
22	Falls Location Historic District	Falls Location Historic District	December 22, 1983 (#83003689)	At the Paint River; 46°06′27″N 88°20′20″W	Crystal Falls	The Falls Location Historic District is collection of seven log houses and associated outbuildings developed between 1880 and 1900, likely in part due to the opening of the nearby Crystal Falls Mine. In spite of some cosmetic changes, the Falls Location Historic District is significant as a cohesive late 19th Century settlement of log dwellings, one of only three left in Iron County.
23	Finnish and Swedish Mercantile Association Building	Finnish and Swedish Mercantile Association Building	December 22, 1983 (#83003691)	336 Superior Ave. 46°05′49″N 88°19′56″W	Crystal Falls	This is a commercial block built in 1908 for a co-operative grocery and department store collectively owned by local Finns and Swedes. It is significant as a historical reminder of the large Scandinavian population of Crystal Falls in the early 20th century.
24	First National Bank Building	First National Bank Building	December 22, 1983 (#83003692)	303 Main St. 46°02′45″N 88°22′35″W	Alpha	This building was built in 1914, and is a single-story, square-plan, glazed brick building with an angled corner entrance. Brick pilasters flank the entrance and intersect a pressed metal cornice.
25	Nelson E. Fisher House – High Banks	Nelson E. Fisher House – High Banks	December 22, 1983 (#83003694)	US 2; 46°05′51″N 88°40′29″W	Iron River	"High Banks" was built in 1912 for Nelson A. Fisher, a leading Iron River businessman and one of the "Big Five." Iron River's Big Five together organized the Iron Savings and Loan Association in 1905, the Iron River Realty Company, the Iron Range Light and Power Company, and platted the Village of Caspian in 1907. Fisher's daughter Aileen Fisher later became a notable children's author, and her childhood memories of High Banks are reflected in her writing.
26	Forest Route 157 – Tamarack River Bridge	Forest Route 157 – Tamarack River Bridge	December 17, 1999 (#99001520)	Forest Route 157 over the Tamarack River; 46°14′50″N 88°58′41″W	Stambaugh Township	The bridge was technologically significant as one of the two oldest concrete girder bridges designed by the Michigan State Highway Department. The bridge was the last link in the trunk line route through Iron County – then known as the "Cloverland Trail" – and in July 1916 was the site of the formal dedication of the route. It was demolished and replaced with a new bridge in 2008.
27	Henry H. Frailing House	Henry H. Frailing House	December 22, 1983 (#83003696)	19 W. Cuyuga St. 46°05′36″N 88°38′18″W	Iron River	The Henry H. Frailing House is an Italianate house built in approximately 1916 for Henry H. Frailing, owner of the Iron River Creamery. It is a symmetrical hipped roof house built of brick with sandstone window ledges and a sandstone beltcourse.
28	Dennis J. Haggerty House	Dennis J. Haggerty House	December 22, 1983 (#83003699)	7 N. 7th Ave. 46°05′16″N 88°38′44″W	Iron River	This brick Bungalow-style house was built in 1926 for Dennis J. Haggerty, a skilled tradesman who worked for many local mines. Haggerty was one of the earliest settlers in the county, arriving in the Iron River area in 1879.
29	George Hamilton House	George Hamilton House	December 22, 1983 (#83003703)	504 Seldon Rd. 46°05′03″N 88°38′35″W	Stambaugh	This house was built in 1914 as the home of George Hamilton, one-time city engineer, and president of the Stambaugh village council in 1898. The house is a 1 1/2-story bungalow with a gable roof and walls clad with stucco and shingles.
30	Gottfried Hane House	Gottfried Hane House	December 22, 1983 (#83003701)	703 W. Cayuga St. 46°05′36″N 88°38′46″W	Iron River	This house was built in 1915 for Gottfried Hane, a Swedish-born blacksmith, who emigrated to the United States in 1889. The house was a Queen Anne / Colonial Revival with a hipped roof, multiple gables, and clapboard siding. This house is missing and presumed demolished.
31	M. A. Hanna Company Michigan District Superintendent's House	M. A. Hanna Company Michigan District Superintendent's House	December 22, 1983 (#83003705)	506 Selden Rd. 46°05′03″N 88°38′36″W	Stambaugh	This house was built in 1933 by M.A. Hanna to house the chief executive officer of the company's local mines. It is a two-story Colonial Revival structure with a symmetrical facade.
32	John W. Hanson House	John W. Hanson House	December 22, 1983 (#83003707)	601 Roosevelt Ave. 46°04′58″N 88°37′33″W	Stambaugh	This house was built about 1920 for John W. Hanson. The house has stylized Federal details, including a segmental-arch side porch and Palladian windows in the gables, making this house unique in the county
33	Joseph Harris House	Joseph Harris House	December 22, 1983 (#83003709)	615 Washington Ave. 46°04′56″N 88°37′55″W	Stambaugh	This house is two-story Prairie-style house with a massive segmental-arch front porch which extends to one side to form a porte cochere. The house was first owned by Joseph Harris, owner of the Harris Clothing Store in Iron River, which operated from about 1910 to about 1925.
34	H. W. Harte Block – Crystal Falls Village Hall	H. W. Harte Block – Crystal Falls Village Hall	December 22, 1983 (#83003698)	414-418 Superior Ave. 46°05′49″N 88°20′01″W	Crystal Falls	The Harte Block was a two-story frame commercial building constructed around 1890 for Henry W. Harte, a prominent Crystal Falls lumberman. It was moved in 1895, at which time the Crystal Falls village offices took up residence in the building. The village offices remained in the building until 1913, when Joseph Bendick bought the building from the city and moved it across the street. The building is missing and presumed demolished.
35	John Hasselstrom House	John Hasselstrom House	December 22, 1983 (#83003723)	400 Crystal Ave. 46°05′52″N 88°19′58″W	Crystal Falls	No longer extant. The John Hasselstrom House is a 1 1/2-story frame house built in 1898 by John Hasselstrom, a local carpenter and woodcutter, for his own use. It is an unusual vernacular interpretation of the Queen Anne style, having a prominent octagonal turret with a steep roof.
36	Hiawatha Mine Number One Complex	Hiawatha Mine Number One Complex	December 22, 1983 (#83003711)	West of Selden Rd. 46°04′33″N 88°38′38″W	Stambaugh	The Hiawatha Mine Number One Complex is a collection of five buildings covering four acres. Iron ore was first mined at this site in 1893 by William Seldon and Findley Morrison. Development was intermittent until 1899, after which the Hiawatha became one of the most productive mines in the county, operating until 1950. The most prominent structure in the complex is the 120-foot tall steel Hiawatha Mine Number One headframe, dating from 1904. It is the oldest surviving headframe in Michigan.
37	Nels A. Holmes Farmstead	Nels A. Holmes Farmstead	December 22, 1983 (#83003713)	Off M-189; 46°03′01″N 88°38′38″W	Stambaugh	In 1884, Nelson Holmes, a native of Sweden who had immigrated to the United States two years previously, homesteaded the land this farmsite sits on. Nelson Holmes died in 1932 and passed the property on to his son Herman, a logger and contractor who served three terms as Iron County Sheriff. When Herman Holmes died in 1941, he passed the farm on to his brother-in-law, William Sackerson. The farm has been in the Holmes and Sackerson family for over 100 years.
38	House at 902 Selden Road	House at 902 Selden Road	December 22, 1983 (#83003714)	902 Selden Rd. 46°04′49″N 88°38′36″W	Stambaugh	This house was constructed for the Youngstown Mines Corporation, presumably for the families of administrative or supervisory employees. It is sided with clapboard and Queen Anne circle-butt shingling on the gable.
39	Frank C. Huse House	Frank C. Huse House	December 22, 1983 (#83003724)	408 5th St. 46°05′31″N 88°20′03″W	Crystal Falls	This house was presumably constructed for Frank C. Huse, the local agent for the Chicago and North Western Railway and for the American Express Company. The house faintly resembles a small-town depot, and is clad with tongue-and-groove siding and pierced bargeboards on the gable ends.
40	Iron County Courthouse	Iron County Courthouse	February 24, 1975 (#75000948)	Western end of Superior Ave. 46°05′48″N 88°20′07″W	Crystal Falls	The Iron County Courthouse is a 2 1/2-story Richardsonian Romanesque building, J. C. Clancy of Antigo, Wisconsin, sitting on a hilltop overlooking Crystal Falls' business street. The county seat location famously resulted in a bitter late-19th-century feud between Crystal Falls and Iron River, eventually decided in favor of Crystal Falls.
41	Iron County Fair Exhibition Hall	Iron County Fair Exhibition Hall	December 22, 1983 (#83003716)	Franklin St. 46°06′02″N 88°38′47″W	Iron River	The Iron County Fair Exhibition Hall is a concrete block building designed by architect David E. Anderson, and constructed in 1931 at the site of the Iron County Fair. The building has a central, two-story octagonal section with single-story wings radiating outward; it is perhaps the last of a series of polygonal county fair exhibition buildings built in Michigan.
42	Iron River Creamery	Iron River Creamery	December 22, 1983 (#83003717)	5 W. Cayuga St. 46°05′36″N 88°38′17″W	Iron River	The Iron River Creamery was founded in 1913 by Henry H. Frailing and quickly outgrew the original building. Frailing built this new, larger creamery building in 1920. The Iron River Creamery is architecturally significant as a good example of commercial architecture in the Classical Revival style.
43	Iron River Town Hall	Iron River Town Hall	December 22, 1983 (#83003718)	106 W. Genesee St. 46°05′31″N 88°38′21″W	Iron River	This building was constructed in 1915, thirty years after Iron River's incorporation as a village. The structure was designed by architect Samuel C. Allen, of Flint, Michigan, and built by countractors Jacobson and Kohl. The building is a three-story rectangular Neo-Classical structure built of red brick and sitting on a sandstone foundation. It continues to serve the City of Iron River.
44	Italian Society Duke of Abruzzi Hall	Italian Society Duke of Abruzzi Hall	December 22, 1983 (#83003719)	East of McGillis Ave. between Morgan and Sawyer Sts. 46°03′41″N 88°37′17″W	Caspian	The Duca Degli Abruzzi Italian Society was formed on September 26, 1909, by Italian men living in Caspian. The society constructed the Duke of Abruzzi Hall in 1914 as a fraternal lodge hall. The building was remodeled in 1929, at which time the present yellow brick facade was added to the building. The Hall contains a dance hall with its original tin ceiling and a wine-making and sausage-seasoning room; a bocce court is next to the building.
45	Jacob Jacobson House	Jacob Jacobson House	December 22, 1983 (#83003720)	327 Maple Ave. 46°14′07″N 88°26′56″W	Amasa	This house was apparently built by carpenter Jacob Jacobson in 1902 as his own residence. It is a 1 1/2-story rectangular frame structure with a gable roof and clad in clapboards. A hipped roof porch with squared and turned columns runs the full length of the house, and a lean-to addition is located in the rear.
46	James Mine Historic District	James Mine Historic District	December 22, 1983 (#83003721)	Mineral Ave. and Mower St. 46°06′50″N 88°38′33″W	Mineral Hills	The James Mine was operated by the Mineral Hills Mining Company from its opening in 1906 (as the "Osana Mine") until 1925, after which the site was acquired by the James Mining Company. The James Mine operated until 1950. The structures in the district were built between 1906 and 1921 by the Mineral Hills Mining Company for its miners and mine officials. The structures include a dry house, pump house, blacksmith shop, and engine house as well as the surrounding residential community, including the Mineral Hills Village Hall and houses with garages and other outbuildings.
47	Joseph Joseph House	Joseph Joseph House	December 22, 1983 (#83003722)	105 N. 8th Ave. 46°05′24″N 88°38′50″W	Iron River	This house was built in 1925 and first lived in by Joseph Joseph, an early Jewish settler. Joseph arrived in Iron River in 1914 and opened a clothing and millinery shop. The single-story house covered with white stucco and topped with a red tile roof is a unique example of Spanish-style architecture in the county.
48	Louis Levine House		December 22, 1983 (#83003725)	502 Selden Rd. 46°05′04″N 88°38′35″W	Stambaugh	This house was built c. 1922-25, with one of the earliest owners being Louis Levine. The house is a distinctive Colonial structure, with a veranda with Tuscan running across the front, and clapboard and shingle siding.
49	Lincoln School	Lincoln School	December 22, 1983 (#83003726)	Northwest of Madison St. and 2nd Ave. 46°06′03″N 88°38′26″W	Iron River	The Lincoln School was designed by the Iron River architectural firm of Smith and Anderson, and constructed in 1916 by A.H. Proksch. Built at the peak of Iron River's prosperity, the school was the most highly developed Neo-Classical structure in Iron County. This building is missing and presumed demolished.
50	Alexander MacKinnon House	Alexander MacKinnon House	December 22, 1983 (#83003727)	134 Cayuga St. 46°05′37″N 88°38′23″W	Iron River	This house was constructed in approximately 1900 for Alexander MacKinnon, who lived here until 1919. Alexander and his brother Donald MacKinnon pioneered the prospecting of the Iron River Valley for iron ore. The two first arrived in the area in 1878, and in 1881 platted the village of Iron River.
51	Donald C. MacKinnon House	Donald C. MacKinnon House	December 22, 1983 (#83003728)	411 N. 9th St. 46°05′32″N 88°38′55″W	Iron River	This house was constructed in 1885 for Donald MacKinnon. Donald and his brother Alexander MacKinnon pioneered the prospecting of the Iron River Valley for iron ore. The two first arrived in the area in 1878, and in 1881 platted the village of Iron River. Donald C. MacKinnon served as the first village president of Iron River. This house is missing and presumed demolished.
52	Mansfield Mine Location Historic District	Mansfield Mine Location Historic District	December 22, 1983 (#83003731)	Stream Rd. 46°07′07″N 88°13′10″W	Mansfield	The Mansfield Mine was founded near this location in 1889 by the Mansfield Mining Company. On September 28, 1893, a cave-in occurred, collapsing multiple levels of the mine and allowing the waters of the overhead Michigamme River to break into the mine, drowning twenty-seven of the forty-eight miners working on the site. The incident is still the single worst mining accident in Iron County's history. The mine closed after the accident, but in 1896, the DeSoto Iron Company of Springfield, Illinois bought the property, diverted the river, and reopened the mine. The district includes a collection of primarily residential log buildings constructed between 1896 and about 1900.
53	Mansfield Road – Michigamme River Bridge		December 17, 1999 (#99001519)	Mansfield Rd. over the Michigamme River; 46°06′49″N 88°12′59″W	Mansfield Township	This bridge was a filled spandrel arch with an elliptical profile, completed in 1915. In 2007, the bridge was demolished and replaced with a replica.
54	John S. McLean House	John S. McLean House	December 22, 1983 (#83003729)	230 4th St. 46°05′03″N 88°37′53″W	Stambaugh	This house was constructed by the Stambaugh Company in approximately 1882 for John McLean, a skilled blacksmith. It is one of several built around the same time by the company to house key personnel in the iron mining industry. McLean purchased the property from the Stambaugh Company in 1893, and continued to own it until 1915.
55	Lafayette McQuown House	Lafayette McQuown House	December 22, 1983 (#83003730)	411 Adams St. 46°05′05″N 88°37′52″W	Stambaugh	This house was built in about 1895 for Lafayette McQuown, an early resident of Stambaugh who assisted William Selden, Jr. in surveying the town site in 1882. McQuown served as village president in 1893-94 and as Secretary of the Stambaugh Township Board of Education for eighteen years. It is a typical example of a late 19th century miner's residence in good condition.
56	William Moss House	William Moss House	December 22, 1983 (#83003734)	528 W. Genesee St. 46°05′31″N 88°38′40″W	Iron River	This house was built in approximately 1908, and is unusual in Iron County as a middle-class duplex, more so because the floor plans of the first and second floor are dissimilar. It is likely that the original owner, William Moss, occupied the first floor and let out the second.
57	Munro – M.A. Hanna Mining Company Office Building	Munro – M.A. Hanna Mining Company Office Building	December 22, 1983 (#83003736)	107 N. 4th St. 46°05′21″N 88°38′35″W	Iron River	The Munro – M.A. Hanna Mining Company Office Building is a large, symmetrical, two-story, Classical Revival brick structure with a projecting stone-trimmed front entrance. The building was constructed in approximately 1920 by the Munro Mining Company, which in 1929 was acquired by M. A. Hanna Company.
58	Timothy Murphy House	Timothy Murphy House	December 22, 1983 (#83003737)	17 N. 4th St. 46°05′51″N 88°19′57″W	Crystal Falls	The Timothy Murphy House, also known as the Harbour House, is a massive two-story hipped roof Queen Anne/Colonial Revival structure built from rough-faced cement blocks in about 1900 by Fred Floodstrand, a local master mason and bricklayer. It has a two-story, wooden, "steamboat-style" wraparound porch that contrasts nicely with the mass of the house. The house is closely associated with John and Ellen Harbour, their daughter Maude (or Minnie), and her husband Timothy Murphy, the Stambaugh railroad depot superintendent. In 1982 the house was purchased for the Crystal Falls Museum Society and was extensively restored. It currently serves as a hands-on museum for the society.
59	Park City Historic District	Park City Historic District	December 22, 1983 (#83003739)	Park City and DNR Rds. 46°13′53″N 88°26′17″W	Amasa	The Park City Historic District is a settlement containing seven log houses and associated outbuildings built by iron miners working in the nearby Michigan Mine. The district is one of three remaining log cabin settlements in Iron County, and is significant as one of the settlements purchased and developed by miners themselves, rather than by the mining company.
60	John H. Parks Company – Wills Hardware Building	John H. Parks Company – Wills Hardware Building	December 22, 1983 (#83003740)	319 Superior Ave. 46°05′48″N 88°19′54″W	Crystal Falls	This building was constructed in approximately 1890 for the John H. Parks Company Department Store. John H. Parks served as president of the village board and was the first mayor of Crystal Falls. Parks later turned his business into a hardware store, and in 1915, Tom Wills purchased the building for his hardware store.
61	Herman Rau House	Herman Rau House	December 22, 1983 (#83003742)	309 Marquette Ave. 46°05′44″N 88°19′55″W	Crystal Falls	This house was built in about 1890 for Herman Rau, the owner of a local grocery and meat market. The house is notable for its well-preserved Late Victorian detailing.
62	David M. Ross House	David M. Ross House	December 22, 1983 (#83003743)	120 S. 4th St. 46°05′42″N 88°19′58″W	Crystal Falls	This cobblestone house was built for David M. Ross, owner of the D.M. Ross and Company grocery store, and is one of the best examples of bungalow style in Iron County.
63	Steven Royce House	Steven Royce House	December 22, 1983 (#83003744)	920 Forest Parkway; 46°05′49″N 88°20′30″W	Crystal Falls	The house was built by the mining firm of Corrigan, McKinney & Company, one of the local iron-mining firms, as a residence for their professional and managerial personnel. Steven Royce, a geologist with Corrigan, McKinney, was an early occupant of the house.
64	William Russell House	William Russell House	December 22, 1983 (#83003746)	209 Michigan Ave. 46°05′40″N 88°19′48″W	Crystal Falls	This two-story frame house was constructed in 1888 for William Russell, an early Crystal Falls businessman who owned a saloon and horse stable and worked as a contractor. The house is one of the finest Queen Anne houses in Iron County. It has a cross-gable roof and narrow clapboard siding. The gable ends are covered with wooden shingles and contain arched lunettes. Brackets with sunray-pattern turned spindles support one cantilevered gable.
65	Scalcucci's Grocery	Scalcucci's Grocery	December 22, 1983 (#83003748)	2102 River Ave. 46°06′30″N 88°38′14″W	Iron River	The building was constructed in 1905, and in 1914 was purchased by John Scalcucci. Scalcucci operated a grocery store on the first floor and lived on the second. The grocery is significant as the site of the February 1920 incident which touched off the "Rum Rebellion" when local police seized several barrels of wine stored in the Scalcucci basement. However, they had no warrant and Iron County State's Attorney Martin S. McDonough refused to press charges. Central state prohibition director Major A.V. Dalrymple declared Iron County in open rebellion against prohibition and descended on Iron County in force, precipitating a confrontation. Eventually a compromise was reached, and Dalrymple left with no arrests made.
66	John Soderman Farmhouse	John Soderman Farmhouse	December 22, 1983 (#83003749)	N. 6th St. 46°06′16″N 88°20′12″W	Crystal Falls	This house was originally owned by John Soderman, a successful dairy and potato farmer. Soderman was one of the few full-time farmers in Iron County.
67	Spies Boardinghouse	Spies Boardinghouse	December 22, 1983 (#83003750)	700 Grant St. 46°06′34″N 88°37′55″W	Mineral Hills	The Spies Boardinghouse is a long, two-story rectangular structure with clapboard siding, a gable-roof, and a one-story shed at one end. The building was constructed in 1909 by James Johnson for the Cleveland Cliffs Iron Company, owners of the nearby Spies Mine, to house unmarried miners.
68	St. Mary's Assumption Catholic Church	St. Mary's Assumption Catholic Church	December 22, 1983 (#83003759)	105 5th Ave. 46°05′22″N 88°38′41″W	Iron River	This church was built for local Catholics of Polish ancestry. The basement was constructed in 1910-11 and the upper portion was constructed in 1920-22 from a Gothic Revival gable-roofed design by Milwaukee architect Erhard Brielmaier. The parish was closed in 1981-82 and parishioners moved to the nearby St. Agnes.
69	Charles Stolberg House	Charles Stolberg House	December 22, 1983 (#83003751)	411 3rd St. 46°05′08″N 88°37′49″W	Stambaugh	This house was built in 1909 for Charles Stolberg, one of the first residents of Stambaugh. Stolberg worked as a diamond driller and pumpman in local mines for 48 years. The house is significant as one of the most well-preserved Queen Anne structures in Stambaugh.
70	Robert H. Sturgeon House	Robert H. Sturgeon House	December 22, 1983 (#83003752)	112 Cayuga St. 46°05′38″N 88°38′20″W	Iron River	This 2 1/2-story Queen Anne house was built in approximately 1900, and is notable as the residence of Dr. Robert H. Sturgeon, the first physician in Iron River. Dr. Sturgeon worked as a physician for local mining companies, ran his own private practice, and helped found the first hospital in Iron River.
71	John Swanson House	John Swanson House	December 22, 1983 (#83003761)	226 4th St. 46°05′03″N 88°37′54″W	Stambaugh	This house was built in 1913 for John Swanson, who started the Consolidated Mercantile Store in about 1909 with his partner John Olson. The Swanson House is a two-story frame hipped roof American foursquare structure with a full length front porch and attic dormer.
72	Triangle Ranch Headquarters Historic District	Triangle Ranch Headquarters Historic District	December 29, 1983 (#83003762)	North of Amasa; 46°18′54″N 88°25′13″W	Amasa	Triangle Ranch was started in 1920 by Judson G. Rosebush, a prominent banker from Appleton, Wisconsin to raise pedigreed Herefords on a large scale. Rosebush initially purchased 9,472 acres of land and built five enormous. However, the short growing season made laying in necessary winter fodder difficult. After 1925 the ranch sold off some parcels of land and attempted to diversify operations by fur farming, raising sheep and poultry, and operating a dude ranch, but was never profitable. In 1952 the Triangle Ranch closed for good.
73	William J. Tully House	William J. Tully House	December 22, 1983 (#83003764)	419 W. Cayuga St. 46°05′37″N 88°38′39″W	Iron River	This American foursquare house was built in 1909, and served as the last residence of William J. Tully, an early resident of Iron River and eventual mine owner.
74	US 2 – Iron River Bridge		December 9, 1999 (#99001518)	Old US 2 over the Iron River; 46°06′07″N 88°30′00″W	Iron River	The Iron River bridge is a filled spandrel arch bridge 55 feet long, completed in 1917.
75	Van Ornum's Addition Historic District	Van Ornum's Addition Historic District	December 22, 1983 (#83003770)	927, 937, 941, 947, and 953 4th St. 46°05′52″N 88°38′32″W	Iron River	The five houses in this district include four bungalows built by Edward J. Van Ornum as well as Van Ornum's own residence, a two-story hipped roof structure. Van Ornum was a prominent Iron River builder, lumberman, and developer. He built his own American foursquare residence in about 1910 when he was the owner of a successful lumberyard. In 1929 he platted this addition, and in 1934 had the four bungalows constructed.
76	Van Platen - Fox Lumber Camp Historic Complex	Van Platen - Fox Lumber Camp Historic Complex	December 22, 1983 (#83003766)	281 University Rd. 46°10′35″N 88°53′21″W	Stambaugh	The Van Platen - Fox Lumber Camp Historic Complex is a group of four frame buildings, and is significant as perhaps the only extant logging camp in the western Upper Peninsula. The camp was constructed in 1921 by the Van Platen - Fox Lumber Company, who used it as a base for harvesting hardwoods. Van Platen - Fox used the camp until 1935. The University of Michigan used the camp, rechristed Camp Filbert Roth, as a summer training camp for forestry students from 1937 - 1988. All the buildings have been demolished.
77	Harvey Van Wagner House	Harvey Van Wagner House	December 22, 1983 (#83003767)	103 N. 7th Ave. 46°05′21″N 88°38′45″W	Iron River	This house was constructed in approximately 1920, and is a slight modification of Design B-7513 in the 1918 house-plan book "Modern American Homes," by C.L. Bowes. The house is clad in alternating narrow and wide rows of shingles, and has a cross-gable porch resting on brick piers.
78	Wall - Seppanen House	Wall - Seppanen House	December 22, 1983 (#83003768)	21 N. 7th Ave. 46°05′17″N 88°38′45″W	Iron River	The house was built in approximately 1920, and is of a particularly pleasing bungalow design with craftsman elements, clad with stucco and cobblestones. It was once the home of James S. Wall, manager of the Oliver Iron Mining Company and president of the Miners' State Bank. The house was purchased in 1943 by Wayne E. Seppanen, who eventually became superintendent of the Caspian Mine.
79	Joseph Windsor House	Joseph Windsor House	December 22, 1983 (#83003769)	629 W. Genesee St. 46°05′30″N 88°38′44″W	Iron River	This brick and stucco house was built in approximately 1912 for Joseph Windsor, who with his brother William, ran an undertaking and furniture business.

== Former listings ==
	Name on the Register	Image	Date listed	Date removed	Location	City or town	Description
1	Beechwood Store	Beechwood Store	December 22, 1983 (#83003662)	July 1, 2020	215 Beechwood Rd. 46°09′36″N 88°45′27″W	Iron River	This building was constructed in 1912 for Albert J. Sandgren and Andres J.T. Anderson, brothers-in-law and community leaders in Beechwood. It served as country store, post office and the social center of Beechwood, a small Swedish settlement later absorbed into Iron River. The building has been demolished.

== See also ==
- List of Michigan State Historic Sites in Iron County, Michigan
- List of National Historic Landmarks in Michigan
- National Register of Historic Places listings in Michigan
- Listings in neighboring counties: Baraga, Dickinson, Florence (WI), Forest (WI), Gogebic, Houghton, Marquette, Ontonagon, Vilas
