= West Iron County Public Schools =

School district in Michigan

Address
- 601 Nick Baumgartner Way Iron River, Iron County, Michigan, 49935; United States

District information
- Motto: Once a Wykon, Always a Wycon!
- Grades: PreKindergarten–12
- Superintendent: Kevin Schmutzler
- Schools: 2
- Budget: $12,068,000 2022-2023 expenditures
- NCES District ID: 2632910

Students and staff
- Students: 760 (2024-2025)
- Teachers: 50.41 (on an FTE basis) (2024-2025)
- Staff: 105.3 FTE (2024-2025)
- Student–teacher ratio: 15.08 (2024-2025)
- District mascot: Wykons

Other information
- Website: www.westiron.org

West Iron County Public Schools is a public school district in Iron County, in the Upper Peninsula of Michigan. It serves Iron River, Caspian, Gaastra, and the townships of Bates, Iron River, and Stambaugh.

== History ==
Iron River's Central School, designed by Milwaukee architects Van Ryn & DeGelleke, was built in 1904. It closed in 1980, but was restored and renovated as an apartment building around 2013. It is located at 218 West Cayuga Street.

In March 1928, a new high school opened in Iron River. It included a 650-seat auditorium and "every possible device and equipment for the comfort and convenience of its occupants," according to a newspaper. A few weeks after the opening of the high school, about half of the student body went on strike for a day, upset over the termination of their science teacher.

Stambaugh's school district and Iron River's school district merged in 1967, forming the current district. The Wykon was invented by some of the high school staff to be the district's mascot. It is a scary blue lion-like creature with three legs.

On January 13, 1988, a gas explosion at the high school badly injured a coach and eighteen students. A leak under a sidewalk near the school seeped into the school's basement and exploded when a coach turned on a light. The blast damaged the interior of the weight room and boys' locker room.

A bond issue passed in 1992 to fund construction of a new high school.

After becoming the district's middle school, the old Iron River High School closed after the 2008-2009 school year. The building became Windsor Center, which houses arts and recreation programs for the community.

== Schools ==
Schools in West Iron County Public Schools are in connected buildings on a campus in Iron River.

Schools in West Iron County Public Schools district
School	Address	Notes
West Iron County Middle and High School	701 Nick Baumgartner Way, Iron River	Grades 6–12.
Stambaugh Elementary	700 Washington Avenue, Iron River	Grades PreK-5.
