= List of Michigan State Historic Sites in Iron County =

Location of Iron County in Michigan

The following is a list of Michigan State Historic Sites in Iron County, Michigan. Sites marked with a dagger (†) are also listed on the National Register of Historic Places in Iron County, Michigan.

== Current listings ==
Name	Image	Location	City	Listing date
Caspian City Hall		340 East Caspian Avenue	Caspian	February 23, 1978
Caspian Community Center† Demolished		404 Brady Avenue	Caspian	July 26, 1974
EJAY Theatre	EJAY Theatre	304 Superior Avenue	Crystal Falls	December 5, 1986
First Roadside Park	First Roadside Park	US 2	4 miles east of Iron River	March 19, 1958
Gaastra City Hall	Gaastra City Hall	1 Main and Valley Street	Gaastra	February 23, 1978
Nelson A. Holmes Farmstead†	Nels A. Holmes Farmstead	2614 M-189	Iron River	July 17, 1997
James Innes Building	James Innes Building	414 West Genesee Street	Iron River	October 27, 1983
Iron County Courthouse†		West end of Superior Avenue	Crystal Falls	September 17, 1974
Iron County Informational Designation	Iron County	Iron County Courthouse front lawn, west end of Superior Avenue	Crystal Falls	January 24, 1958
Iron Inn		202 West Adams	Iron River	December 18, 1974
Italian Society Duke of Abruzzi Hall†		East side of McGillis Avenue between Morgan and Sawyer streets	Caspian	July 26, 1974
Donald C. MacKinnon House† (demolished)		411 North Ninth Street	Iron River	September 17, 1974
Ojibwe Indian Village and Burial Ground	Ojibwe Indian Burial Grounds	1630 Co. Rd. 424	Crystal Falls	September 17, 1974
Wisconsin-Michigan Boundary Survey Informational Designation		T41N, R32W, Sec. 9, where US 2 crosses the Brule River	Alpha vicinity	August 23, 1956

== See also ==
- National Register of Historic Places listings in Iron County, Michigan

== Sources ==
- Historic Sites Online – Iron County. Michigan State Housing Developmental Authority. Accessed January 23, 2011.
