= Iron River =

Iron River may refer to:

== Communities ==
- Iron River Township, Michigan, United States
  - Iron River, Michigan, a city in the township
- Iron River, Wisconsin, United States, a town
  - Iron River (CDP), Wisconsin, an unincorporated community and census-designated place within the town
- Iron River, Alberta, Canada, a hamlet

== Waterways in the United States ==
- Iron River (Menominee River tributary)
- Iron River (Marquette County, Michigan)

== See also ==
- Big Iron River, Michigan
