= US 2–Iron River Bridge =

- U.S. National Register of Historic Places
- Location within Michigan Location within the United States
- Interactive map
- Location: Genesee Street over Iron River, Iron River, Michigan
- Coordinates: 46.09145°N 88.63508°W
- Area: less than 1 acre (0.4 ha)
- Built: 1917
- Built by: Hoose & Person Const. Co.
- Architect: Michigan State Highway Department
- Architectural style: Spandrel arch bridge
- MPS: Highway Bridges of Michigan MPS
- NRHP reference No.: 99001518
- Added to NRHP: December 9, 1999

The US 2–Iron River Bridge, also known as the Genesee Street Bridge, is a bridge located on Genesee Street (a bypassed segment of U.S. Route 2) over the Iron River in Iron River, Michigan. It was listed on the National Register of Historic Places in 1999.

== History ==
The village of Iron River was platted in 1881 along the Iron River. The river itself flowed through the center of town, and was an impediment to travel between the two sides of town. The first bridge spanning the river here was built in the 19th century; however, the boom in Iron River's population in the early 20th century, in addition to the designation of a state trunk line through Iron River, put a strain on the original structure. In the mid-1910s, the village requested the Michigan State Highway Department design a replacement. The department designed this structure, designating it Trunk Line Bridge No. 191, and awarded a contract for its construction to the Hoose and Person Construction Company. Hoose and Person completed the bridge in 1917 at a cost of $20,343.16, of which the village of Iron River paid approximately two-thirds. In the 1920s, the trunk line through Iron River was incorporated into US 2.

In 1998, US-2 was relocated, and the section where this bridge stands left to carry local traffic.

== Description ==
The Iron River bridge is a filled spandrel arch bridge 55 feet (17 m) long and 75 feet (23 m) wide, with a roadway width of 45 feet (14 m). It has a tapered ring arch, corbeled slightly from the spandrel. Concrete guardrails with incised panels are on each side. The bridge is in essentially unaltered condition.

== See also ==
- List of bridges on the National Register of Historic Places in Michigan
- National Register of Historic Places listings in Iron County, Michigan
