= Iron, Michigan =

Iron, Michigan may refer to:

- Iron County, Michigan
- Iron River, Michigan, a city in Iron County, Michigan
