= Mineral Hills, Michigan =

- Former village
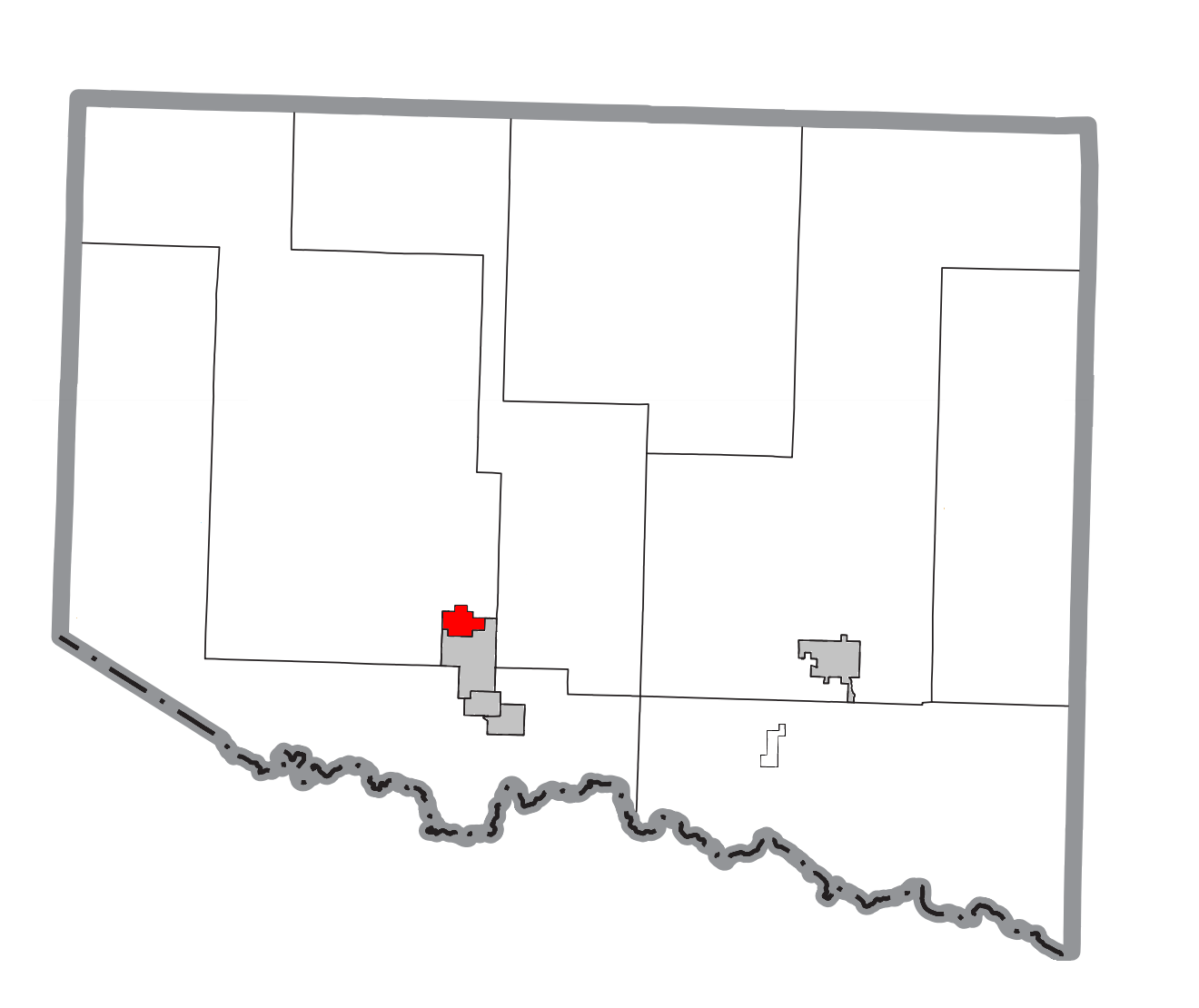
- Former location within Iron County

- Location within the state of Michigan
- Coordinates: 46°6′59″N 88°38′51″W
- Country: United States
- State: Michigan
- County: Iron
- Township: Iron River
- Incorporated: 1918

Area
  - Total: 1.5 sq mi (3.8 km^{2})
  - Land: 1.5 sq mi (3.8 km^{2})
  - Water: 0 sq mi (0.0 km^{2})
- Elevation: 1,598 ft (487 m)

Population (2000)
  - Total: 214
  - Density: 150/sq mi (57/km^{2})
- Time zone: UTC-6 (Central (CST))
  - Summer (DST): UTC-5 (CDT)
- FIPS code: 26-54580
- GNIS feature ID: 1620839

Mineral Hills was a village in southeastern Iron River Township, Iron County, in the U.S. state of Michigan. In the 2000 census, the village population was 214.

Effective July 1, 2000, the village of Mineral Hills and the city of Stambaugh were consolidated with the city of Iron River.

== History ==
Mineral Hills grew up around the James Mine, after iron ore was discovered outside the Iron River valley in 1905. In 1906, the Mineral Hills Mining Company, which also operated mines in nearby Iron River, developed "West James Location" west of the James Mine. Other mining companies followed, developing Wauseca, Forbes, Virgil and Homer locations in the area that would eventually become the village. "Locations" typically consisted of about a dozen primitive houses, which lacked running water and basements. The village was centered on the West James Location along West Mineral Avenue.

In 1919, the locations incorporated as a village approximately 2.4 km (1.5 mi) north of the village of Iron River, with a village hall constructed at the West James Location in 1921. However, a commercial district never developed in the village, and it relied on Iron River for commercial services, though active mines would continue to operate in Mineral Hills into the 1960s when the Wauseca Mine closed.

On November 2, 1999, the voters of Mineral Hills approved consolidation into a new city along with the cities of Stambaugh and Iron River, which continued under the name of Iron River. The consolidation became effective July 1, 2000.

Parts of the village lie within the Iron County MRA on the National Register of Historic Places, which includes one district (James Mine Historic District) and one standalone structure (Spies Boardinghouse).

== Geography ==
According to the United States Census Bureau, the village has a total area of 3.8 km^{2} (1.5 sq mi), all land.

== Demographics ==
As of the census of 2000, there were 214 people, 90 households, and 57 families residing in the village. The population density was 57.0 people /km^{2} (148 people/mi^{2}). There were 95 housing units at an average density of 25.3 units /km^{2} (66 units/mi^{2}). The racial makeup of the village was 96.73% White, 0.47% Native American, 0.47% from other races, and 2.34% from two or more races. Hispanic or Latino of any race were 0.47% of the population.

There were 90 households, out of which 33.3% had children under the age of 18 living with them, 46.7% were married couples living together, 11.1% had a female householder with no husband present, and 35.6% were non-families. 34.4% of all households were made up of individuals, and 18.9% had someone living alone who was 65 years of age or older. The average household size was 2.38 and the average family size was 2.95.

In the village, the age of the population was spread out, with 26.2% under the age of 18, 8.9% from 18 to 24, 29.0% from 25 to 44, 20.1% from 45 to 64, and 15.9% who were 65 years of age or older. The median age was 36 years. For every 100 females, there were 107.8 males. For every 100 females age 18 and over, there were 97.5 males.

The median income for a household in the village was $30,750, and the median income for a family was $33,472. Males had a median income of $30,000 versus $16,667 for females. The per capita income for the village was $12,486. About 17.0% of families and 13.6% of the population were below the poverty line, including 20.0% of those under the age of eighteen and none of those 65 or over.
