= M-189 (Michigan highway) =

State highway in Iron County, Michigan, United States

M-189
- M-189 highlighted in red

Route information
- Maintained by MDOT
- Length: 7.786 mi (12.530 km)
- Existed: c. 1932–present

Major junctions
- South end: WIS 139 near Iron River
- North end: US 2 in Iron River

Location
- Country: United States
- State: Michigan
- Counties: Iron

Highway system
- Michigan State Trunkline Highway System; Interstate; US; State; Byways
← M-188	→ M-199

M-189 is a north–south state trunkline highway in the Upper Peninsula of the US state of Michigan. It serves as the continuation of Highway 139 (WIS 139) from Wisconsin into Michigan, connecting to US Highway 2 (US 2) in Iron River. M-189 has been largely unchanged since being designated in the 1930s, although a new bridge over the Brule River at the state line was built in 1988.

== Route description ==
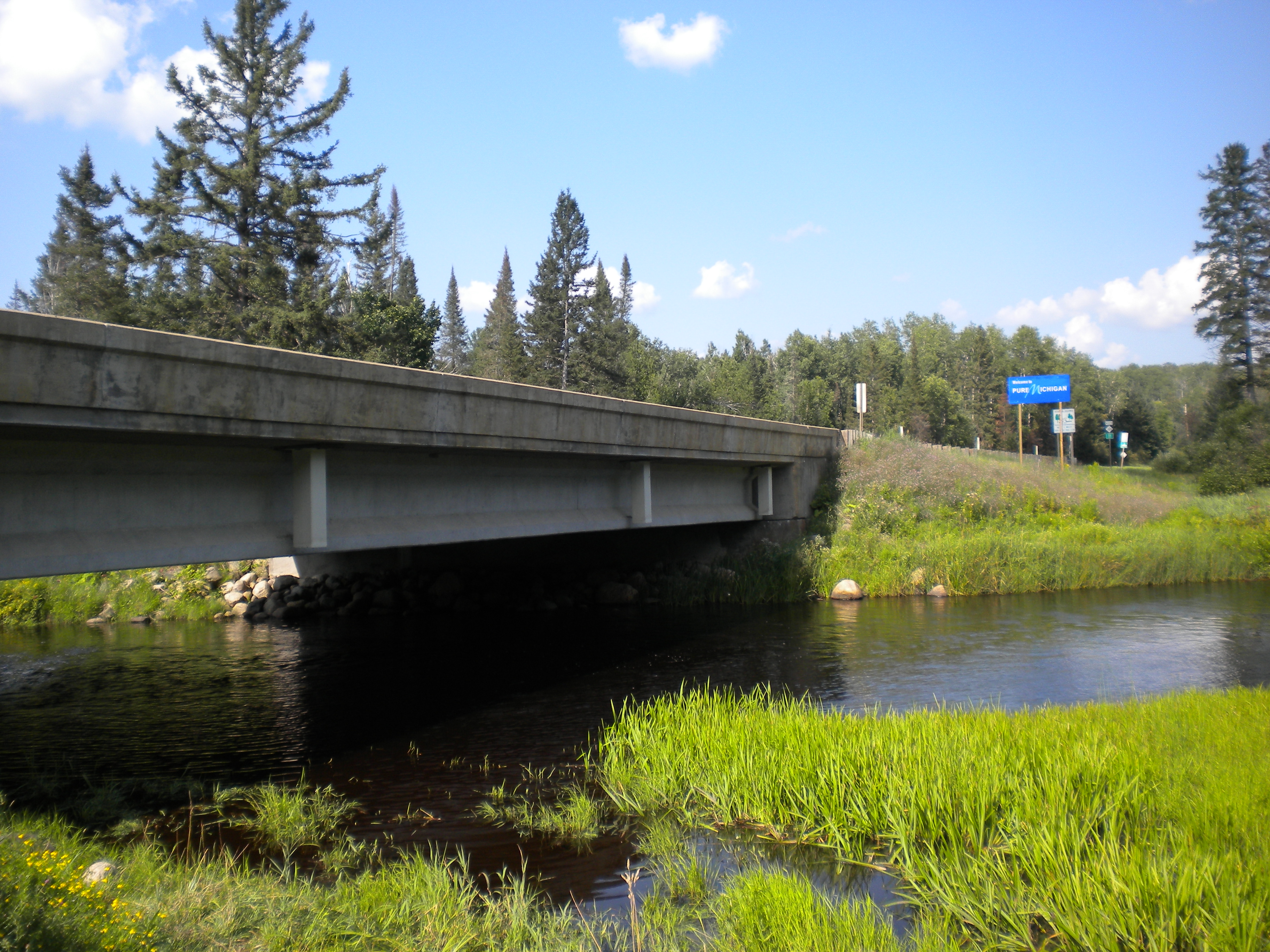
Brule River crossing as WIS 139 transitions to M-189

M-189 starts at the Wisconsin state line in the middle of a bridge crossing the Brule River that connects to WIS 139. The highway runs to the northeast away from the river through forests. The trunkline turns north and curving to the east to run past Laurel Lake. The highway forks at the junction with Caspian Cutoff Road (County Road 651); M-189 takes the northwesterly fork and runs around the west side of Caspian. The roadway passes the Iron River County Club as the highway begins to parallel the Iron River. M-189 follows Selden Road north through the southside of the city of Iron River, continuing as 4th Street into downtown. The trunkline ends at a junction with US 2 (Adams Street) in the middle of town.

No part of M-189 is listed on the National Highway System. In 2009, the Michigan Department of Transportation conducted a survey to determine the traffic volume along the highway, reported using a metric called average annual daily traffic (AADT). The department determined that 892 vehicles a day used the highway near the state line while 5,308 vehicles used the central section through Caspian. The northernmost segment near US 2 had an AADT of 4,079 vehicles.

== History ==
The Michigan State Highway Department designated M-189 as a state trunkline highway in late 1932 or early 1933. During the latter half of 1936, the department paved the highway in its entirety. The route has remained the same since. The current bridge across the Brule River was built in 1988.

== Major intersections ==
The entire highway is in Iron County.

Location	mi	km	Destinations	Notes
Stambaugh Township	0.000	0.000	WIS 139 south – Long Lake	Wisconsin state line
Iron River	7.786	12.530	US 2 – Ironwood, Crystal Falls	
1.000 mi = 1.609 km; 1.000 km = 0.621 mi
