= Forest Route 157–Tamarack River Bridge =

- U.S. National Register of Historic Places
- Location within Michigan Location within the United States
- Interactive map
- Location: Forest Highway 157 over Tamarack River, Stambaugh Township, Michigan
- Coordinates: 46°14′50″N 88°58′41″W
- Area: less than 1 acre (0.40 ha)
- Built: 1916
- Built by: Barnum & Counihan
- Architect: Michigan State Highway Dept.
- Architectural style: Concrete through girder
- MPS: Highway Bridges of Michigan MPS
- NRHP reference No.: 99001520
- Added to NRHP: December 17, 1999

External image
- The original bridge

The Forest Route 157–Tamarack River Bridge, also known as the San Souci Bridge, was a bridge located on Federal Forest Highway 157 over the Tamarack River in Stambaugh Township, Michigan. It was listed on the National Register of Historic Places in 1999, and demolished in the late 2000s.

== History ==
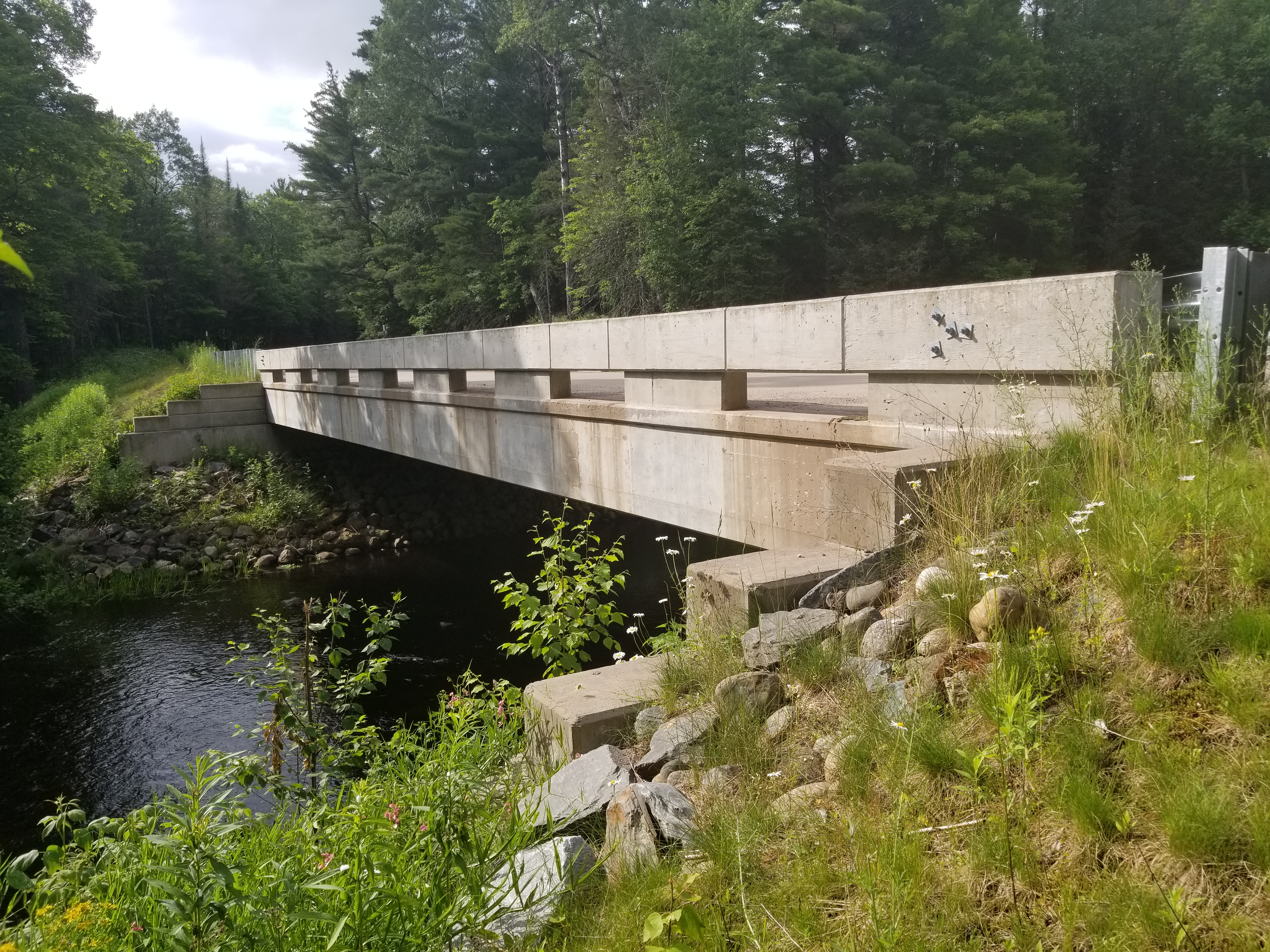
The replacement bridge

During the 1910s, a road was developed through Iron County running from Dickinson County through Crystal Falls and Iron River and on to Gogebic County. Between Iron River and the county line, the road crossed three rivers: Cook's Run River, the Paint River and the Tamarack River. In 1915 the Michigan State Highway Department let out contracts to construct 50-foot (15 m) spans over each river; these bridges were designated Trunk Line Bridges 26, 27, and 28, respectively. Barnum and Counihan were awarded the contracts to build the bridges at Cook's Run and over the Tamarack River. The Tamarack River bridge was completed in 1916 at a cost of $2,826.10.

The bridge was the last link in the trunk line route—then known as the "Cloverland Trail"—and on July 21, 1916 was the site of the formal dedication of the route. It was located near the Sans Souci flag railroad station on a Chicago and North Western line. 1,500 people took part, although many of them were forced to arrive by train, alongside about 270 automobiles and motorcars. Food included 1,500 pounds (680 kg) of meat.

In the 1920s the Cloverland Trail developed into US Highway 2, but by 1942 the segment crossing the Tamarack River had been realigned, and the old section re-designated as a Forest Road in the Ottawa National Forest. The Forest Route 157–Tamarack River Bridge carried vehicular traffic, and was in essentially unaltered condition. The bridge was technologically significant as one of the two oldest concrete girder bridges designed by the Michigan State Highway Department.

The bridge was listed on the National Register of Historic Places in 1999, but it was demolished and replaced in 2008.

== Description ==
The main span of the Forest Route 157–Tamarack River Bridge was 50 feet (15 m) long and 19 feet (5.8 m) wide, with a roadway width of 17 feet (5.2 m). The bridge represented a standard 1915–16 Michigan State Highway Department design. The bridge consisted of two concrete girders resting on concrete abutments with angled wingwalls. The bridge was modestly detailed, with recessed rectangular panels on the outside walls and bronze "Trunk Line Bridge" plates (since removed) on the girders' inside walls.
