= Stambaugh Airport =

Airport in Iron River, Michigan, US

- IATA: none; ICAO: none; FAA LID: Y73

Summary
- Airport type: Public
- Owner/Operator: Iron County, Michigan
- Serves: Iron River, Michigan
- Time zone: UTC−06:00 (-6)
  - Summer (DST): UTC−05:00 (-5)
- Elevation AMSL: 1,618 ft / 493 m
- Coordinates: 46°04′43″N 088°38′07″W
- Website: ironmi.org/airport

Map
- Location of airport in Michigan Y73 (the United States)

Runways
Direction	Length		Surface
Direction	ft	m	Surface
17/35	2,000	610	Asphalt

Statistics
- Aircraft operations (2022): 2,500
- Based aircraft (2023): 11
- Source: Federal Aviation Administration

Stambaugh Airport, (FAA LID: Y73) is a public use airport located 1 mile (1.6 km) southeast of the central business district of Iron River, a city in Iron County, Michigan, United States. The closest airport with commercial airline service is Ford Airport about 31 miles (50 km) to the southeast in Iron Mountain, Michigan.

Although most airports in the United States use the same three-letter location identifier for the FAA and International Air Transport Association (IATA), this airport is assigned Y73 by the FAA but has no designation from the IATA or ICAO. It is not included in the Federal Aviation Administration (FAA) National Plan of Integrated Airport Systems for 2021–2025.

== Facilities and aircraft ==
Stambaugh Airport covers an area of 80 acres (32 ha) at an elevation of 1,618 feet (493 m) above mean sea level. It has one asphalt runway; 17/35 is 2,000 by 40 feet (610 x 12 m).

For the 12-month period ending December 31, 2022, the airport had 2,500 aircraft operations, an average of 48 per week: all of it was general aviation. In November 2023, there were 11 aircraft based at this airport: 10 single-engine airplanes and 1 ultralight.

The airport does not have a fixed-base operator, and no fuel is available.

== See also ==
- List of airports in Michigan
- Upper Peninsula of Michigan
