= Central School (Iron River, Michigan) =

- U.S. National Register of Historic Places
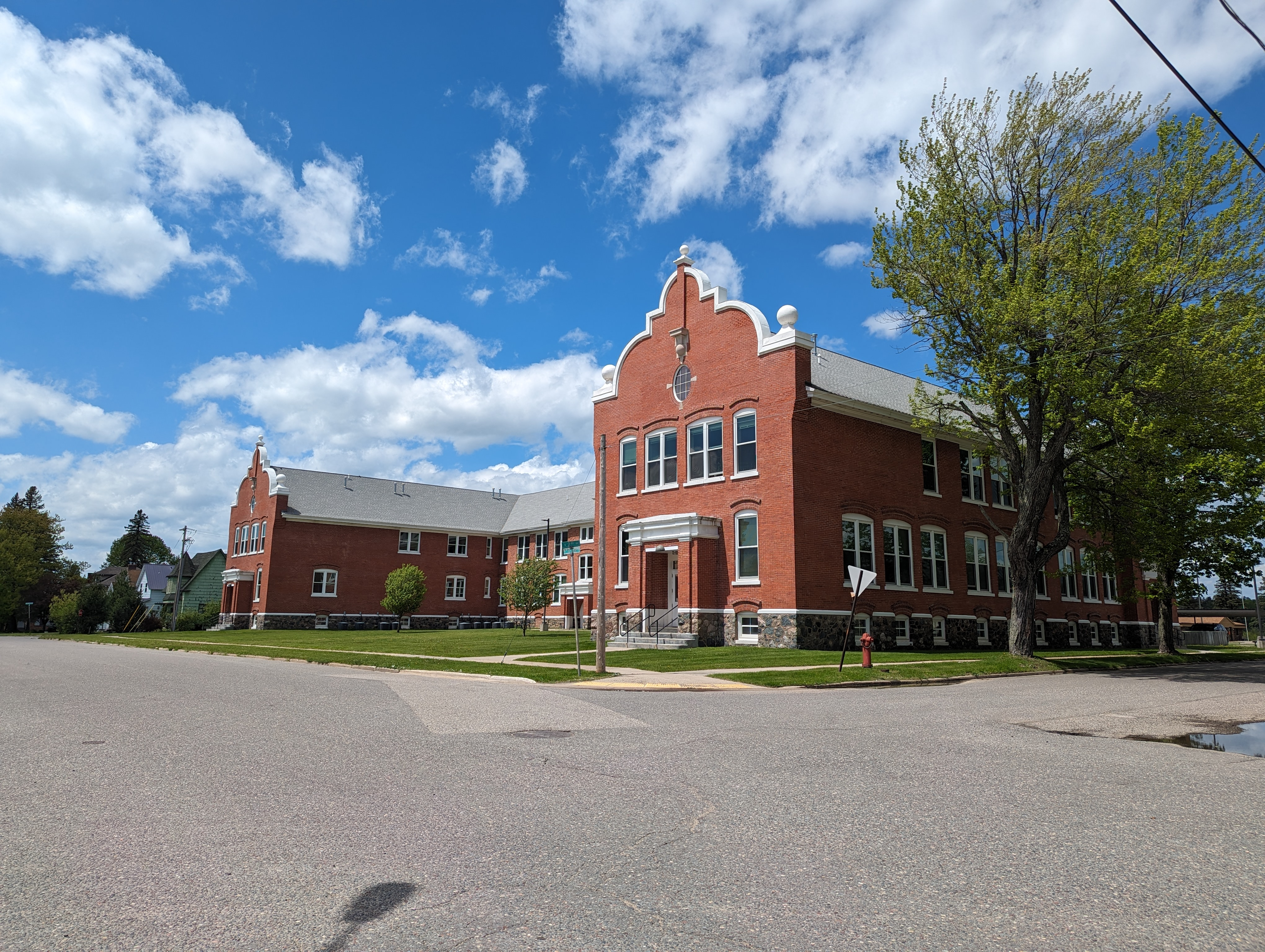
- Apple Blossom Apartment Homes, the former Central School, in 2024

- Location within Michigan Location within the United States
- Interactive map
- Location: 218 West Cayuga St, Iron River, Michigan
- Coordinates: 46°5′38″N 88°38′26″W
- Area: Less than one acre
- Built: 1905
- Architect: Van Ryn & DeGelleke; John D. Chubb
- Architectural style: Dutch Colonial Revival
- NRHP reference No.: 08000584
- Added to NRHP: July 3, 2008

Central School is a school located at 218 West Cayuga Street in Iron River, Michigan, United States. It was listed on the National Register of Historic Places in 2008.

== History ==
Iron River constructed the first Central School just south of the site of the present building in 1884. The school was expanded in 1889, 1898, and 1902; the city built additional buildings, but the school system struggled to keep up with the booming population of Iron River. In 1902, a new school building was planned for the site, and the Milwaukee firm of Van Ryn & DeGelleke was engaged to design the building. However, construction did not begin until 1904, when Newman & Johnson were awarded a contract to construct the school. However, the new building was sufficient for only a few years, and in 1910 the school district engaged John D. Chubb of Chicago to design two wings and a boiler room, which were constructed in 1910-11. "Annexes," likely separate temporary structures, were constructed in 1923, but removed some time later.

Central School served as a high school until 1928, when the district built a new high school. After that, it served as a primary and secondary school, with a fluctuating student population as the economy fluctuated and as schools were consolidated.

The school closed in 1980 and was used for storage afterward. The building was purchased by the Iron River Downtown Development Authority, and they renovated it into an 18-unit cooperative housing structure, known as the "Apple Blossom Apartments."

== Description ==
With its Flemish gable ends, the school is a fine example of Dutch Colonial Revival-style architecture. The original building contained ten classrooms, lab and recitation space, and a 500-seat assembly hall.

A contemporaneous account describes the original structure:

The Central School in Iron River is an imposing and modern structure of two stories and a basement.... It is lighted with electricity and heated with steam and hot air, the air being forced into the rooms by means of a large fan. It also includes among its improvements an electric vacuum cleaning plant in the basement, which is probably the only one in operation in an Upper Peninsula school building.

The 1910-11 wings added more classrooms, as well as a music studio, commercial room, stenographic room, dark room, and offices for school district personnel.

== Gallery ==
=== External images ===
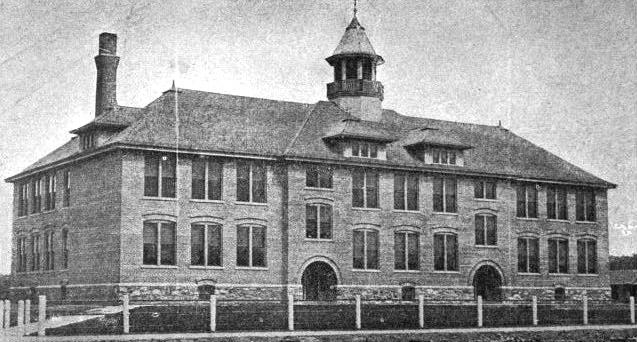
Central School c. 1909 (original building)

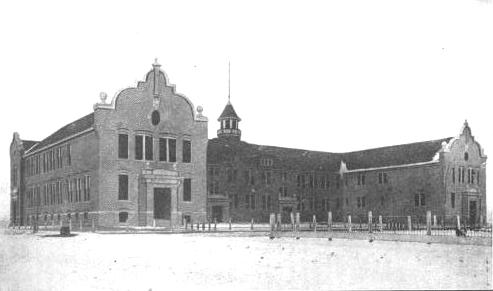
Central School c. 1911 (addition being built)

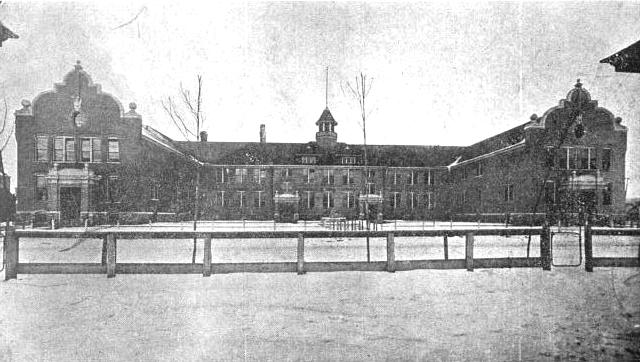
Central School c. 1919 (addition completed)

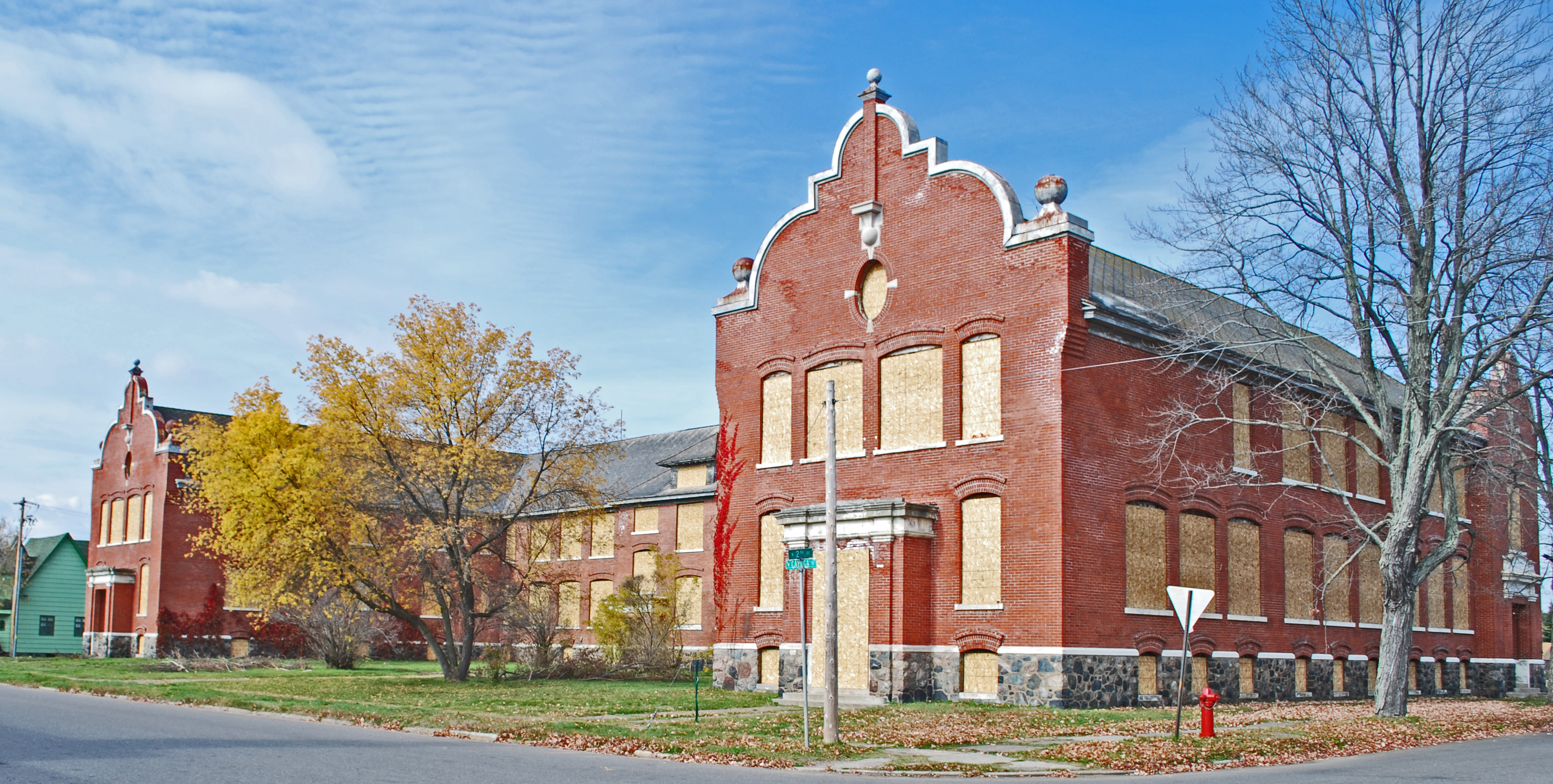
Central School in 2010

=== Internal images ===
Images of Central School c. 1919

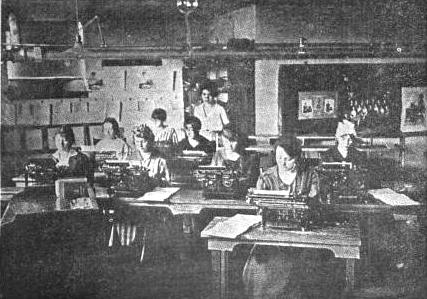
Commercial Room

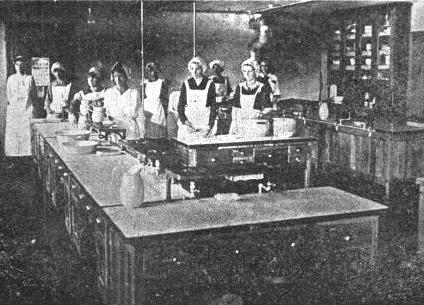
Cooking Room

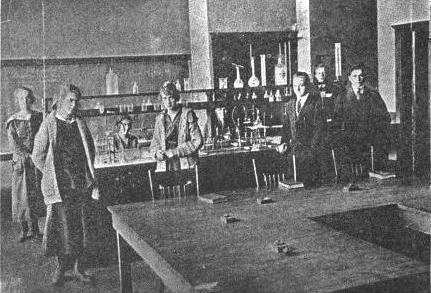
Science Room

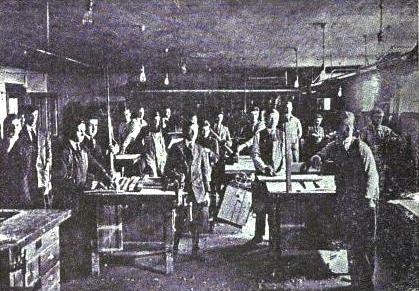
Shop Room
