= Mansfield Road–Michigamme River Bridge =

Bridge in United States of America

- U.S. National Register of Historic Places
- Location within Michigan Location within the United States
- Interactive map
- Location: Mansfield Road over Michigamme River, Mansfield Township, Michigan
- Coordinates: 46°6′49″N 88°12′59″W
- Area: less than 1 acre (0.4 ha)
- Built: 1915
- Built by: McGrath & Sons
- Architect: Michigan State Highway Department
- Architectural style: Filled spandrel arch bridge
- MPS: Highway Bridges of Michigan MPS
- NRHP reference No.: 99001519
- Added to NRHP: December 17, 1999

The Mansfield Road–Michigamme River Bridge was a bridge located on Mansfield Road over the Michigamme River in Mansfield Township, Michigan. It was listed on the National Register of Historic Places in 1999.

== History ==
The village of Mansfield was platted in 1889, and grew rapidly along with the nearby Mansfield Mine. However, in 1893, the mine collapsed and flooded, killing 27 miners. The mine closed, and Mansfield was leveled by a forest fire. In 1896, the mine was reopened, and was kept in operation until 1913.

Also in 1913, the Iron County Road Commission began the development of a trunk line route through Crystal Falls and into Mansfield. They planned further development of the route to the east, but this required that the bridge over the Michigammes River be replaced. In 1914, it was decided to replace the bridge. The Michigan State Highway Department designed a new bridge, and the contract to build it was awarded to McGrath and Sons of Green Bay, Wisconsin, for $9,769.06. The bride was completed in 1915. The trunk line through Mansfield was later incorporated into M-69, but by 1936 the highway was rerouted and the section of road containing this bridge was reverted to a county road.

In 2007, the bridge was replaced with a replica.

== Description ==
The Mansfield Road–Michigamme River Bridge was 102 feet (31 m) long and 20 feet (6.1 m) wide, with a main span of 85 feet (26 m) and a roadway width of 17.5 feet (5.3 m). It was a filled spandrel arch with an elliptical profile sitting atop concrete abutments. The tapered arch ring is corbeled on each side, and the guardrails contain panels. The Mansfield Bridge is significant as the longest of the early arched bridges designed by the Michigan State Highway Department.
