= Stambaugh, Michigan =

- Former city
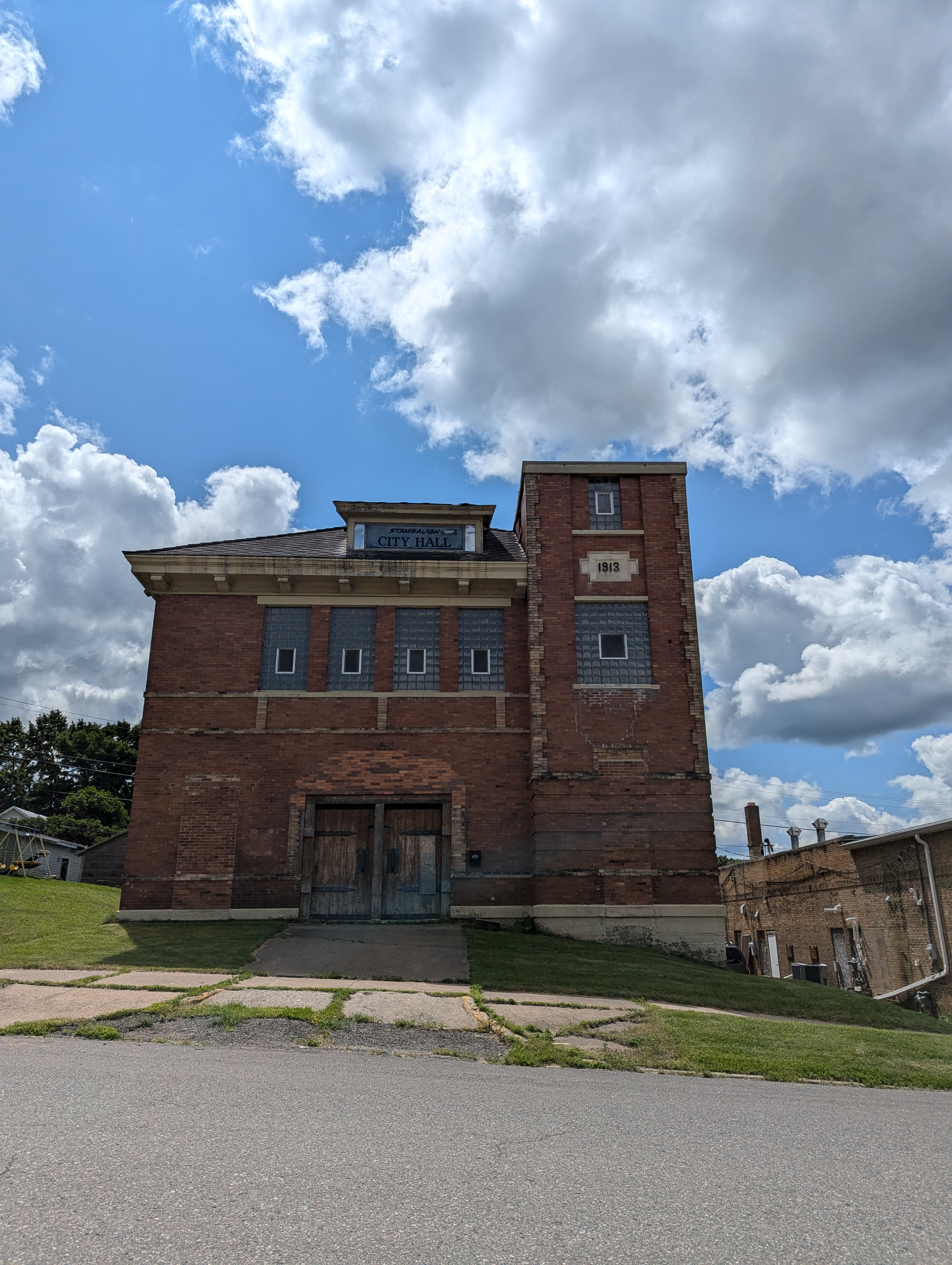
- Former Stambaugh City Hall (2024)

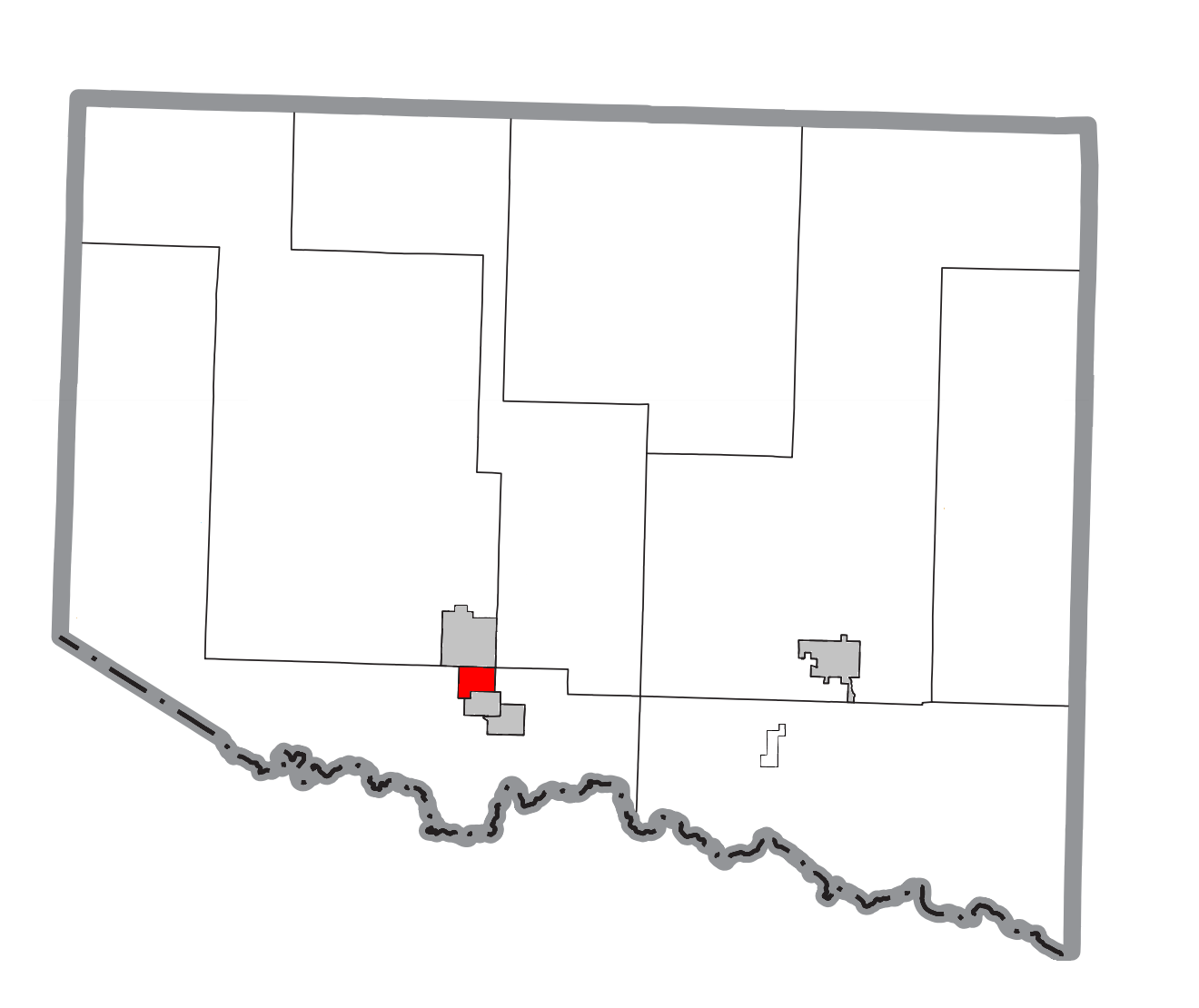
- Former location within Iron County

- Location within the state of Michigan
- Coordinates: 46°4′54″N 88°37′49″W
- Country: United States
- State: Michigan
- County: Iron
- Incorporated: 1890 (village> 1923 (city)

Area
  - Total: 1.7 sq mi (4.3 km^{2})
  - Land: 1.7 sq mi (4.3 km^{2})
  - Water: 0 sq mi (0.0 km^{2})
- Elevation: 1,634 ft (498 m)

Population (2000)
  - Total: 1,243
  - Density: 757/sq mi (292.1/km^{2})
- Time zone: UTC-6 (Central (CST))
  - Summer (DST): UTC-5 (CDT)
- ZIP code: 49964
- Area code: 906
- FIPS code: 26-76060
- GNIS feature ID: 1621758

Stambaugh was a city in Iron County, Michigan, United States. In the 2000 census, the city population was 1,243.

Effective July 1, 2000, the city of Stambaugh and the village of Mineral Hills were both consolidated with the city of Iron River. The city was adjacent to Stambaugh Township, but was administratively autonomous.

== History ==
The settlemented was platted in 1882 and named for John Stambaugh, president of the Todd, Stambaugh Co., who had recently purchased the Iron River Mine, which was located at the townsite. The city incorporated in 1890, and John Stambaugh became its first village president. The village incorporated as a city in 1923.

== Geography ==
According to the United States Census Bureau, the city had a total area of 1.6 square miles (4.1 km^{2}), all land.

=== Climate ===
Climate data for Stambaugh, Michigan, 1991–2020 normals, extremes 1896–present
Month	Jan	Feb	Mar	Apr	May	Jun	Jul	Aug	Sep	Oct	Nov	Dec	Year
Record high °F (°C)	55 (13)	66 (19)	83 (28)	92 (33)	100 (38)	98 (37)	103 (39)	100 (38)	96 (36)	88 (31)	75 (24)	59 (15)	103 (39)
Mean maximum °F (°C)	38.9 (3.8)	46.7 (8.2)	58.7 (14.8)	72.7 (22.6)	82.8 (28.2)	87.4 (30.8)	87.8 (31.0)	86.7 (30.4)	82.9 (28.3)	74.9 (23.8)	57.1 (13.9)	44.0 (6.7)	90.4 (32.4)
Mean daily maximum °F (°C)	21.2 (−6.0)	25.5 (−3.6)	36.8 (2.7)	49.7 (9.8)	64.1 (17.8)	73.3 (22.9)	77.0 (25.0)	75.0 (23.9)	67.3 (19.6)	53.2 (11.8)	37.9 (3.3)	26.3 (−3.2)	50.6 (10.3)
Daily mean °F (°C)	10.7 (−11.8)	12.8 (−10.7)	23.1 (−4.9)	36.9 (2.7)	50.6 (10.3)	60.1 (15.6)	63.7 (17.6)	61.5 (16.4)	54.0 (12.2)	41.8 (5.4)	29.2 (−1.6)	17.4 (−8.1)	38.5 (3.6)
Mean daily minimum °F (°C)	0.3 (−17.6)	0.1 (−17.7)	9.4 (−12.6)	24.1 (−4.4)	37.2 (2.9)	46.8 (8.2)	50.4 (10.2)	47.9 (8.8)	40.8 (4.9)	30.5 (−0.8)	20.5 (−6.4)	8.5 (−13.1)	26.4 (−3.1)
Mean minimum °F (°C)	−24.4 (−31.3)	−25.0 (−31.7)	−16.9 (−27.2)	6.2 (−14.3)	21.6 (−5.8)	30.6 (−0.8)	36.9 (2.7)	34.5 (1.4)	26.3 (−3.2)	16.5 (−8.6)	−0.6 (−18.1)	−16.4 (−26.9)	−29.6 (−34.2)
Record low °F (°C)	−43 (−42)	−45 (−43)	−33 (−36)	−12 (−24)	10 (−12)	23 (−5)	27 (−3)	26 (−3)	15 (−9)	2 (−17)	−17 (−27)	−41 (−41)	−45 (−43)
Average precipitation inches (mm)	1.09 (28)	0.96 (24)	1.49 (38)	2.55 (65)	3.17 (81)	4.00 (102)	4.15 (105)	3.10 (79)	3.48 (88)	3.32 (84)	1.76 (45)	1.46 (37)	30.53 (776)
Average snowfall inches (cm)	14.6 (37)	12.5 (32)	8.7 (22)	7.4 (19)	0.3 (0.76)	0.0 (0.0)	0.0 (0.0)	0.0 (0.0)	0.0 (0.0)	2.1 (5.3)	8.2 (21)	13.6 (35)	67.4 (172.06)
Average extreme snow depth inches (cm)	15.1 (38)	17.5 (44)	14.8 (38)	7.8 (20)	0.4 (1.0)	0.0 (0.0)	0.0 (0.0)	0.0 (0.0)	0.0 (0.0)	1.2 (3.0)	5.5 (14)	10.6 (27)	20.4 (52)
Average precipitation days (≥ 0.01 in)	9.9	7.4	8.2	10.6	12.0	12.1	12.4	11.1	13.1	13.2	10.9	10.6	131.5
Average snowy days (≥ 0.1 in)	9.5	6.8	5.8	2.7	0.3	0.0	0.0	0.0	0.0	1.2	5.6	8.2	40.1
Source 1: NOAA
Source 2: National Weather Service

== Demographics ==
As of the census of 2000, there were 1,243 people, 587 households, and 338 families residing in the city. The population density was 756.5 inhabitants per square mile (292.1/km^{2}). There were 666 housing units at an average density of 405.3 per square mile (156.5/km^{2}). The racial makeup of the city was 95.74% White, 2.33% Native American, 0.32% Asian, 0.24% from other races, and 1.37% from two or more races. Hispanic or Latino of any race were 0.48% of the population.

There were 587 households, out of which 25.2% had children under the age of 18 living with them, 41.6% were married couples living together, 12.1% had a female householder with no husband present, and 42.4% were non-families. 39.2% of all households were made up of individuals, and 25.4% had someone living alone who was 65 years of age or older. The average household size was 2.12 and the average family size was 2.80.

In the city the population was spread out, with 23.6% under the age of 18, 6.8% from 18 to 24, 21.8% from 25 to 44, 21.6% from 45 to 64, and 26.2% who were 65 years of age or older. The median age was 43 years. For every 100 females there were 83.1 males. For every 100 females age 18 and over, there were 81.3 males.

The median income for a household in the city was $23,643, and the median income for a family was $31,118. Males had a median income of $28,750 versus $20,625 for females. The per capita income for the city was $15,890. About 10.7% of families and 13.5% of the population were below the poverty line, including 21.3% of those under age 18 and 8.3% of those age 65 or over.
