= Iron County Courthouse (Michigan) =

- U.S. National Register of Historic Places
- Michigan State Historic Site
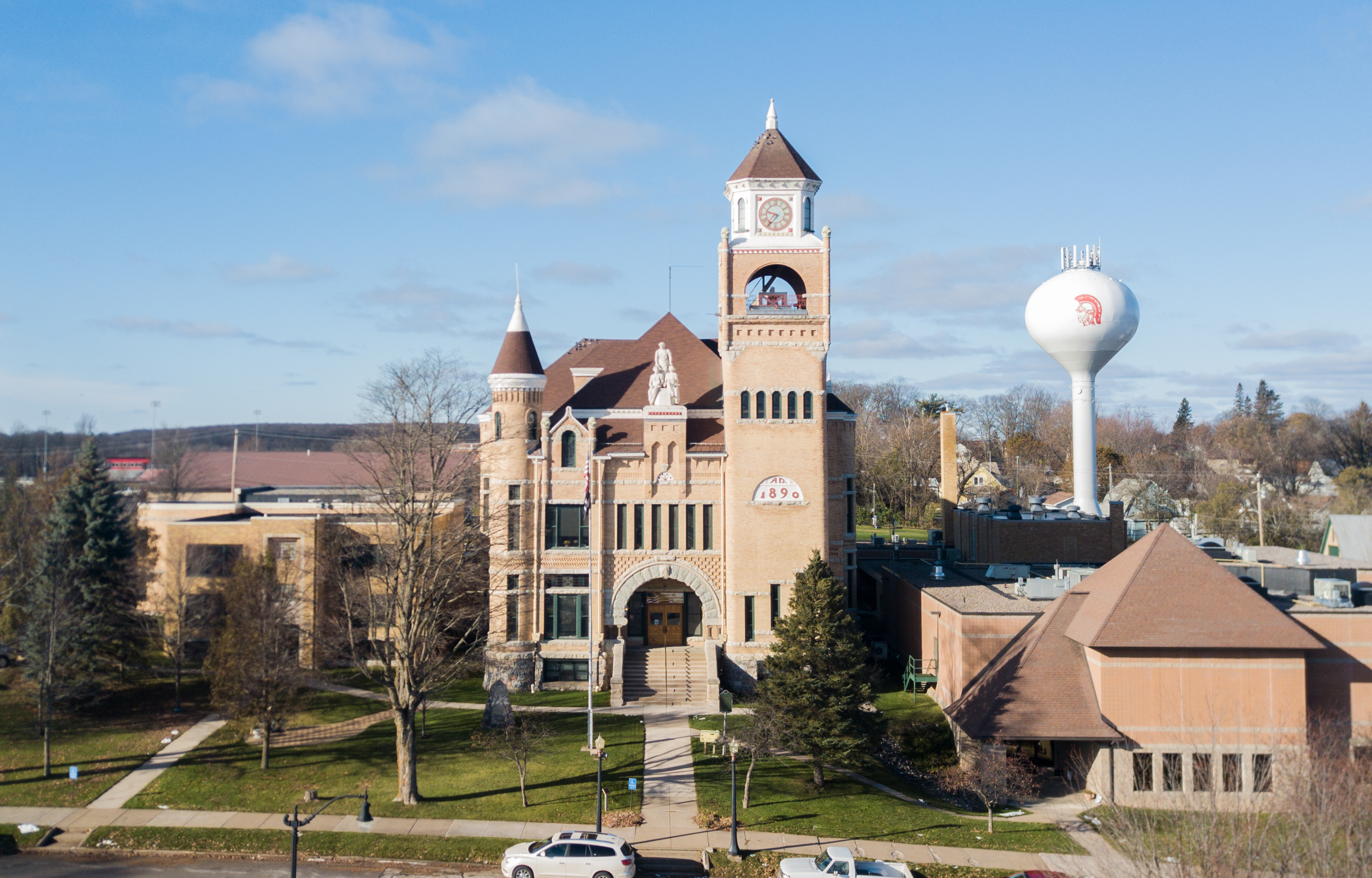

- Location within Michigan Location within the United States
- Interactive map showing the location of Iron County Courthouse
- Location: West end of Superior Ave.], Crystal Falls, Michigan
- Coordinates: 46°5′48″N 88°20′7″W
- Area: 3 acres (1.2 ha)
- Built: 1890
- Built by: Louis A. Webber
- Architect: J.C. Clancey
- Architectural style: Romanesque
- NRHP reference No.: 75000948

Significant dates
- Added to NRHP: February 24, 1975
- Designated MSHS: September 17, 1974

The Iron County Courthouse is a government building located at the west end of Superior Avenue in Crystal Falls, Michigan. It was listed on the National Register of Historic Places in 1975 and designated a Michigan State Historic Site in 1974.

== History ==
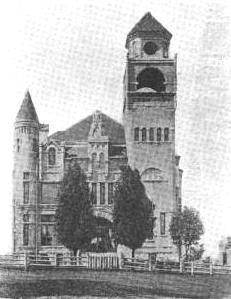
Courthouse c. 1911

Iron County was established in 1885, when it was split from Marquette County. At the time of Iron County's creation, Iron River, then the only incorporated village in the county, was designated the county seat. However, a bitter dispute over the location of county buildings immediately erupted between the geographically disparate east side, centered on Crystal Falls, and the west side, centered on Iron River. At one point county records were spirited away from the temporary courthouse in Iron River by men from Crystal Falls. It was eventually decided to hold a county-wide referendum on the issue. The vote was held in 1888 to decide the location of the county seat; Crystal Falls won by only 5 votes. In 1889, the question was again put before voters, and this time Crystal Falls was selected by a margin of nearly 100 votes, which settled the question.

Bonds were issued for $30,000 to fund courthouse construction, and architect J. C. Clancy of Antigo, Wisconsin was engaged to design the courthouse. It was constructed in 1890–1892 by Louis A. Webber of Menasha, Wisconsin, who bid $26,470. However, Webber was unable to complete the work, and the county hired another contractor to complete the courthouse, entailing a revised total cost of about $40,000.

The clocktower and statutes representing Law, Mercy, and Justice were added in 1910. A wing containing offices was added to the courthouse in 1955. In 2003–2004 another wing was added to the building. The project included a meticulous restoration of the original courthouse by sandblasting and repairing the brickwork.

== Description ==
The Iron County Courthouse is a 2 1/2-story Richardsonian Romanesque building sitting on a hilltop overlooking Crystal Falls' business street. It is built with reddish brown brick walls with stone trim atop a rubble masonry foundation. The front facade has a conical tower on one corner and a square wooden tower topped by a belfry with hexagonal cupola on the other. A rock-face granite central archway contains the main entrance, which is approached via a stairway. Above the archway are the impressive 17-feet-high zinc statues representing Law, Mercy, and Justice.

Inside is a polished oak circuit courtroom. It has an octagonal ceiling covered with decorative pressed metal and a large chandelier with muses and dragons set into the center.
