= Gaastra, Michigan =

City in Michigan, United States

- City
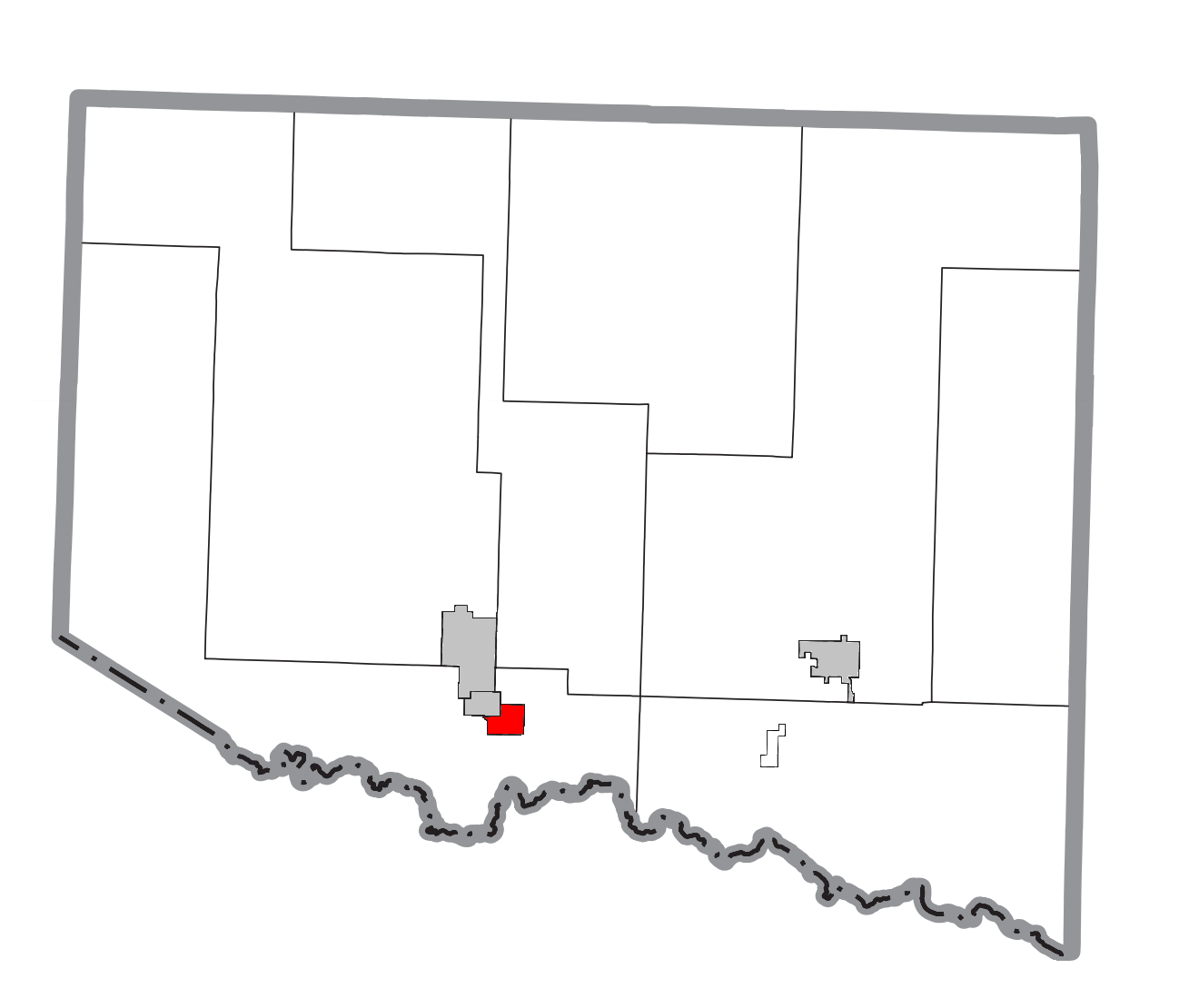
- Location within Iron County

- Location within the state of Michigan
- Coordinates: 46°3′35″N 88°36′20″W
- Country: United States
- State: Michigan
- County: Iron

Area
  - Total: 1.64 sq mi (4.24 km^{2})
  - Land: 1.64 sq mi (4.24 km^{2})
  - Water: 0 sq mi (0.00 km^{2})
- Elevation: 1,621 ft (494 m)

Population (2020)
  - Total: 316
  - Density: 193/sq mi (74.6/km^{2})
- Time zone: UTC-6 (Central (CST))
  - Summer (DST): UTC-5 (CDT)
- ZIP code: 49927
- Area code: 906
- FIPS code: 26-31160
- GNIS feature ID: 0626580
- Website: https://gaastrami.com/

Gaastra is a city in Iron County in the U.S. state of Michigan. As of the 2010 census, the city population was 347, making it Michigan's third-smallest incorporated city by population after Omer (259) and Lake Angelus (290). In 2020, its population was 316.

== History ==
The land was first purchased in 1879 by Alfred Kidder of Marquette. It was then transferred to several other owners, including Andrew Young in 1884 and Edwin H. Piper in 1902. The city is named after Douwe Gaastra, a building contractor and real estate speculator who bought the land in October 1908 and platted the town. A post office was established with the first postmaster being Olaf A. Olson on September 26, 1914. It was incorporated as a village in 1919 and as a city in 1949. Olson retired as postmaster in 1953.

== Geography ==
According to the United States Census Bureau, the city has a total area of 1.64 square miles (4.25 km^{2}), all land.

== Demographics ==
Historical population
Census	Pop.	Note	%±
1920	911		—
1930	755		−17.1%
1940	773		2.4%
1950	575		−25.6%
1960	582		1.2%
1970	479		−17.7%
1980	404		−15.7%
1990	376		−6.9%
2000	339		−9.8%
2010	347		2.4%
2020	316		−8.9%
U.S. Decennial Census

=== 2010 census ===
As of the census of 2010, there were 347 people, 151 households, and 102 families residing in the city. The population density was 211.6 inhabitants per square mile (81.7/km^{2}). There were 179 housing units at an average density of 109.1 per square mile (42.1/km^{2}). The racial makeup of the city was 98.3% White, 0.6% Native American, and 1.2% from two or more races. Hispanic or Latino of any race were 1.2% of the population.

There were 151 households, of which 26.5% had children under the age of 18 living with them, 51.0% were married couples living together, 11.9% had a female householder with no husband present, 4.6% had a male householder with no wife present, and 32.5% were non-families. 30.5% of all households were made up of individuals, and 22.5% had someone living alone who was 65 years of age or older. The average household size was 2.30 and the average family size was 2.82.

The median age in the city was 46.7 years. 23.3% of residents were under the age of 18; 7% were between the ages of 18 and 24; 17.9% were from 25 to 44; 25.9% were from 45 to 64; and 25.9% were 65 years of age or older. The gender makeup of the city was 44.4% male and 55.6% female.

=== 2000 census ===
As of the census of 2000, there were 339 people, 146 households, and 102 families residing in the city. The population density was 205.9 inhabitants per square mile (79.5/km^{2}). There were 164 housing units at an average density of 99.6 per square mile (38.5/km^{2}). The racial makeup of the city was 97.35% White, 0.59% Native American, 0.59% from other races, and 1.47% from two or more races. Hispanic or Latino of any race were 0.88% of the population. 22.0% were of Italian, 20.1% Polish, 13.9% Finnish, 10.6% French and 8.1% American ancestry according to Census 2000. 97.3% spoke English and 2.7% Polish as their first language.

There were 146 households, out of which 28.1% had children under the age of 18 living with them, 57.5% were married couples living together, 8.9% had a female householder with no husband present, and 30.1% were non-families. 30.1% of all households were made up of individuals, and 19.9% had someone living alone who was 65 years of age or older. The average household size was 2.32 and the average family size was 2.87.

In the city, the population was spread out, with 24.5% under the age of 18, 6.8% from 18 to 24, 20.9% from 25 to 44, 20.9% from 45 to 64, and 26.8% who were 65 years of age or older. The median age was 44 years. For every 100 females, there were 87.3 males. For every 100 females age 18 and over, there were 86.9 males.

The median income for a household in the city was $23,125, and the median income for a family was $35,521. Males had a median income of $24,750 versus $29,583 for females. The per capita income for the city was $15,797. About 21.2% of families and 22.2% of the population were below the poverty line, including 39.5% of those under age 18 and 10.9% of those age 65 or over.

== Government ==
Gaastra has no police department and the Caspian / Gaastra Volunteer Fire Department is their joint fire department.
