= Iron River Township, Michigan =

- Civil township
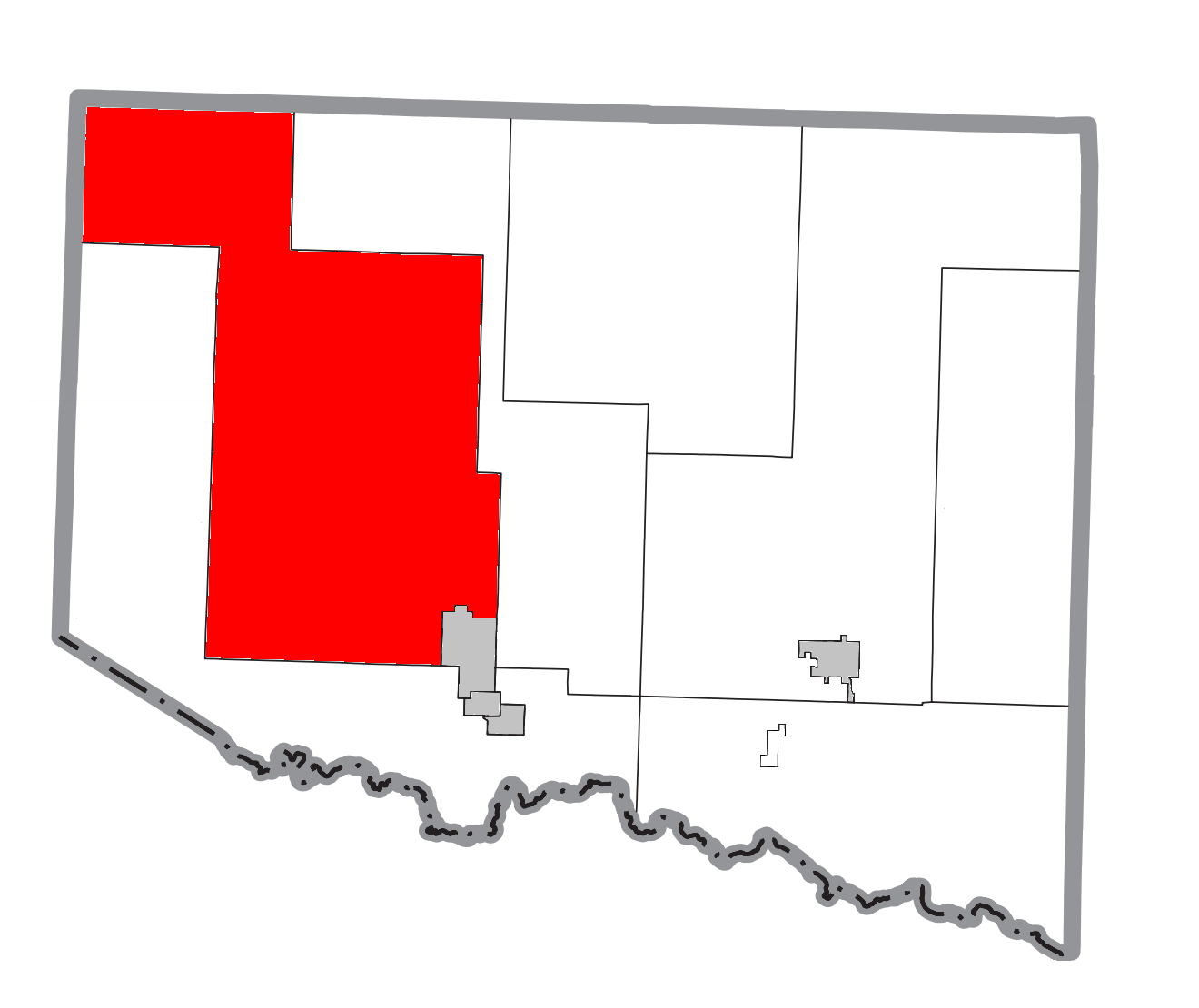
- Location within Iron County

- Location within the state of Michigan
- Coordinates: 46°15′55″N 88°47′25″W
- Country: United States
- State: Michigan
- County: Iron

Area
  - Total: 243.9 sq mi (631.8 km^{2})
  - Land: 239.5 sq mi (620.4 km^{2})
  - Water: 4.4 sq mi (11.3 km^{2})
- Elevation: 1,568 ft (478 m)

Population (2020)
  - Total: 1,052
  - Density: 6.7/sq mi (2.6/km^{2})
- Time zone: UTC-6 (Central (CST))
  - Summer (DST): UTC-5 (CDT)
- ZIP code: 49935
- Area code: 906
- FIPS code: 26-41000
- GNIS feature ID: 1626527
- Website: https://ironrivertownship.com/

Iron River Township is a civil township of Iron County in the U.S. state of Michigan. The population was 1,585 at the 2000 census and 1,052 in 2020.

== Geography ==
According to the United States Census Bureau, the township has a total area of 243.9 square miles (632 km^{2}), of which 239.6 square miles (621 km^{2}) is land and 4.4 square miles (11 km^{2}) (1.80%) is water.

=== Communities ===
- The City of Iron River borders the southeast corner of the township, but is administratively autonomous.
- Beechwood is an unincorporated community in the township northwest of Iron River at 46°09′35″N 88°46′24″W Beechwood was named from a grove of beech trees near the town site. In 1888, Beechwood was made a stop on the Chicago and North Western Transportation Company. In November 1889, a post office was established with Richard M. Dwyer as the first postmaster. The post office was closed in January 1976.
