= Caspian, Michigan =

- City
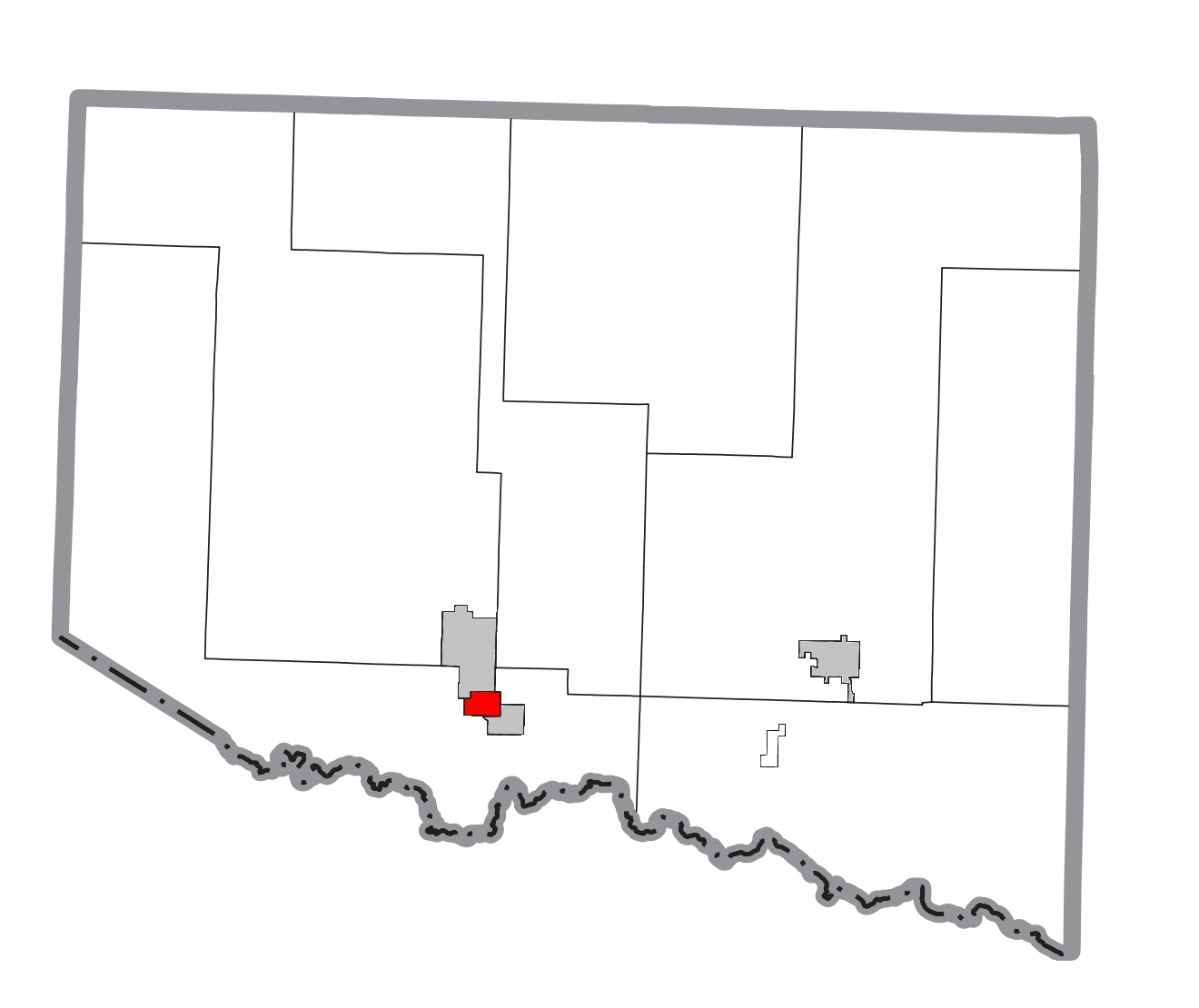
- Location within Iron County

- Location within the state of Michigan
- Coordinates: 46°3′49″N 88°37′44″W
- Country: United States
- State: Michigan
- County: Iron
- Village incorporate: 1918
- City incorporate: 1949

Area
  - Total: 1.42 sq mi (3.69 km^{2})
  - Land: 1.42 sq mi (3.69 km^{2})
  - Water: 0 sq mi (0.00 km^{2})
- Elevation: 1,496 ft (456 m)

Population (2020)
  - Total: 805
  - Density: 564.3/sq mi (217.88/km^{2})
- Time zone: UTC-6 (Central (CST))
  - Summer (DST): UTC-5 (CDT)
- ZIP code: 49915
- Area code: 906
- FIPS code: 26-13860
- GNIS feature ID: 1619449
- Website: https://caspiancity.org/

Caspian is a city in Iron County in the U.S. state of Michigan. The population was 906 at the time of the 2010 census and 805 in 2020. The city has an Italian heritage.

== History ==
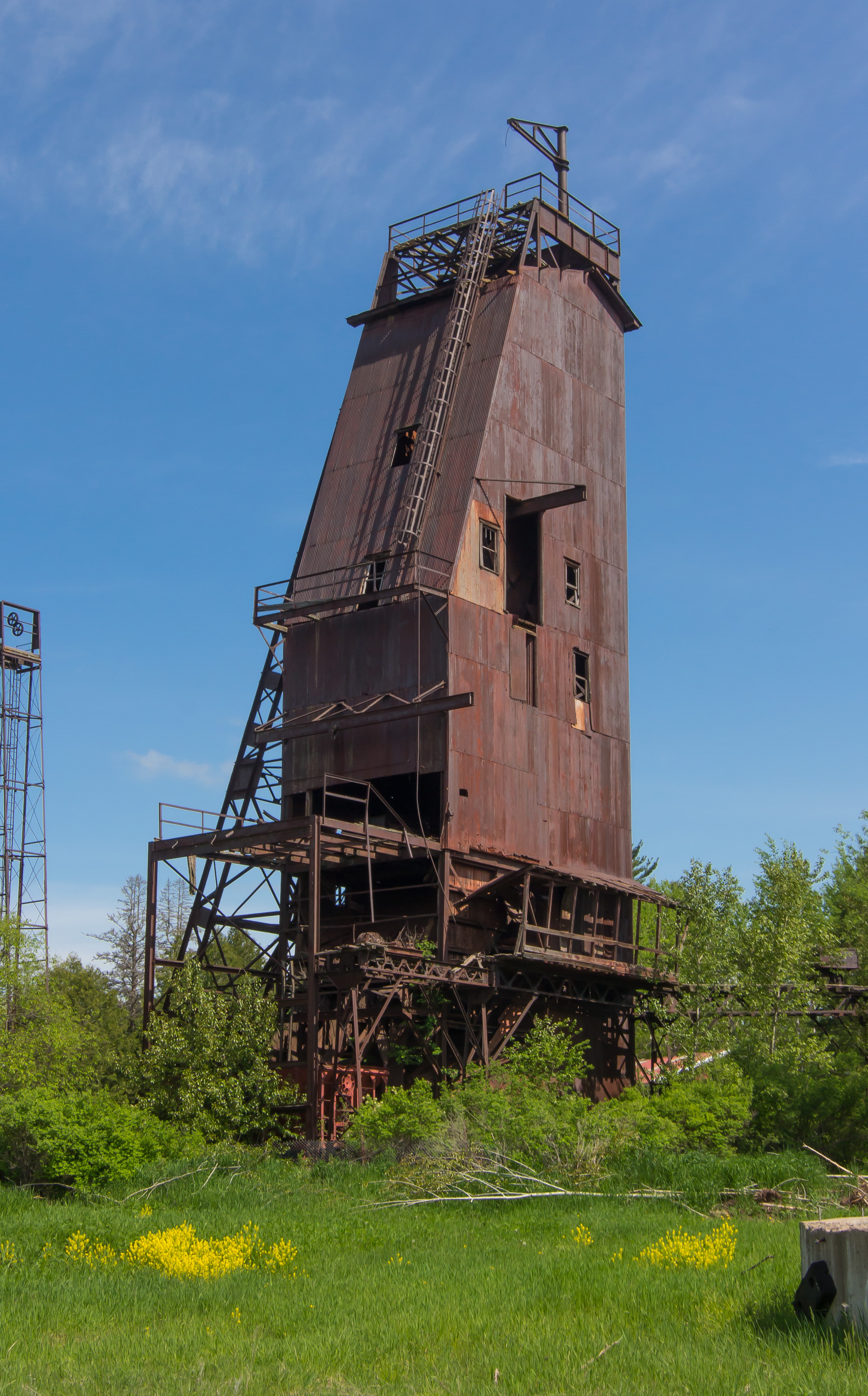
The Caspian Mine headframe, a steel mining building located north of Caspian Road. The original headframe was wooden; the current structure was built as a replacement in 1920. The headframe is a 106 foot high steel-framed structure clad in corrugated steel siding. It is the oldest remaining headframe in Iron County.

The location first received a station on the Chicago & Northwestern Railroad in 1884 and has been known by the names of Spring Valley and Newtown. Caspian was founded and platted with the name Palatka in 1901. It was a headquarters for a mining company, Voroner Mining Company. Voroner operated three mines, Baltic, Caspian, and Fogarty mines. With the expansion of the mines, a second adjacent village named Caspian was founded in 1908. The post office moved there. The location was poor and a new adjacent village called New Caspian was formed in 1909. The whole area was incorporated as the village of Caspian in 1918.

Caspian became a city in 1949.

== Geography ==
According to the United States Census Bureau, the city has a total area of 1.43 square miles (3.70 km^{2}), all land.

=== Climate ===
This climatic region is typified by large seasonal temperature differences, with warm to hot (and often humid) summers and cold (sometimes severely cold) winters. According to the Köppen Climate Classification system, Caspian has a humid continental climate, abbreviated "Dfb" on climate maps.

== Demographics ==
Historical population
Census	Pop.	Note	%±
1920	1,912		—
1930	1,888		−1.3%
1940	1,797		−4.8%
1950	1,608		−10.5%
1960	1,493		−7.2%
1970	1,165		−22.0%
1980	1,038		−10.9%
1990	1,031		−0.7%
2000	997		−3.3%
2010	906		−9.1%
2020	805		−11.1%
U.S. Decennial Census

=== 2010 census ===
As of the census of 2010, there were 906 people, 430 households, and 226 families residing in the city. The population density was 633.6 inhabitants per square mile (244.6/km^{2}). There were 527 housing units at an average density of 368.5 per square mile (142.3/km^{2}). The racial makeup of the city was 95.0% White, 1.4% Native American, 0.7% Asian, and 2.9% from two or more races. Hispanic or Latinos of any race were 1.2% of the population.

There were 430 households, of which 22.3% had children under the age of 18 living with them, 36.3% were married couples living together, 10.0% had a female householder with no husband present, 6.3% had a male householder with no wife present, and 47.4% were non-families. 41.2% of all households were made up of individuals, and 24.7% had someone living alone who was 65 years of age or older. The average household size was 2.11 and the average family size was 2.85.

The median age in the city was 46.4 years. 21.4% of residents were under the age of 18; 7.2% were between the ages of 18 and 24; 19.5% were from 25 to 44; 28.2% were from 45 to 64; and 23.6% were 65 years of age or older. The gender makeup of the city was 48.8% male and 51.2% female.

=== 2000 census ===
As of the census of 2000, there were 997 people, 470 households, and 266 families residing in the city. The population density was 707.9 inhabitants per square mile (273.3/km^{2}). There were 518 housing units at an average density of 367.8 per square mile (142.0/km^{2}). The racial makeup of the city was 97.09% White, 0.30% African American, 1.30% Native American, 0.60% Asian, 0.20% from other races, and 0.50% from two or more races; Hispanic or Latino of any race were 0.30% of the population. Culturally, 26.6% were of Italian, 13.8% German, 10.9% Polish, 9.2% Finnish, 8.4% Swedish and 6.4% French ancestry.

There were 470 households, out of which 24.3% had children under the age of 18 living with them, 38.7% were married couples living together, 14.7% had a female householder with no husband present, and 43.4% were non-families. 40.0% of all households were made up of individuals, and 23.0% had someone living alone who was 65 years of age or older. The average household size was 2.12 and the average family size was 2.83.

In the city, the population was spread out, with 24.3% under the age of 18, 4.4% from 18 to 24, 25.8% from 25 to 44, 20.0% from 45 to 64, and 25.6% who were 65 years of age or older. The median age was 42 years. For every 100 females, there were 94.7 males. For every 100 females age 18 and over, there were 87.3 males.

The median income for a household in the city was $24,524, and the median income for a family was $31,528. Males had a median income of $25,446 versus $16,813 for females. The per capita income for the city was $14,544. About 12.5% of families and 18.3% of the population were below the poverty line, including 25.1% of those under age 18 and 13.8% of those age 65 or over.

== Government ==
Caspian operates a police department and has fire service from the Caspian / Gaastra Volunteer Fire Department.

== See also ==
- National Register of Historic Places listings in Iron County, Michigan
- Iron County MRA
