= Iron River (Menominee River tributary) =

River in Iron County, Michigan

Coordinates: 46°00′36″N 88°34′40″W

The Iron River is a 17.1-mile-long (27.5 km) river in Iron County, Michigan, in the United States. It flows from northwest to southeast through the city of Iron River to the Brule River. It is part of the Menominee River watershed, flowing to Lake Michigan.

The river was named from a visible outcrop of iron ore along its banks.
