= Iron River, Michigan =

- City
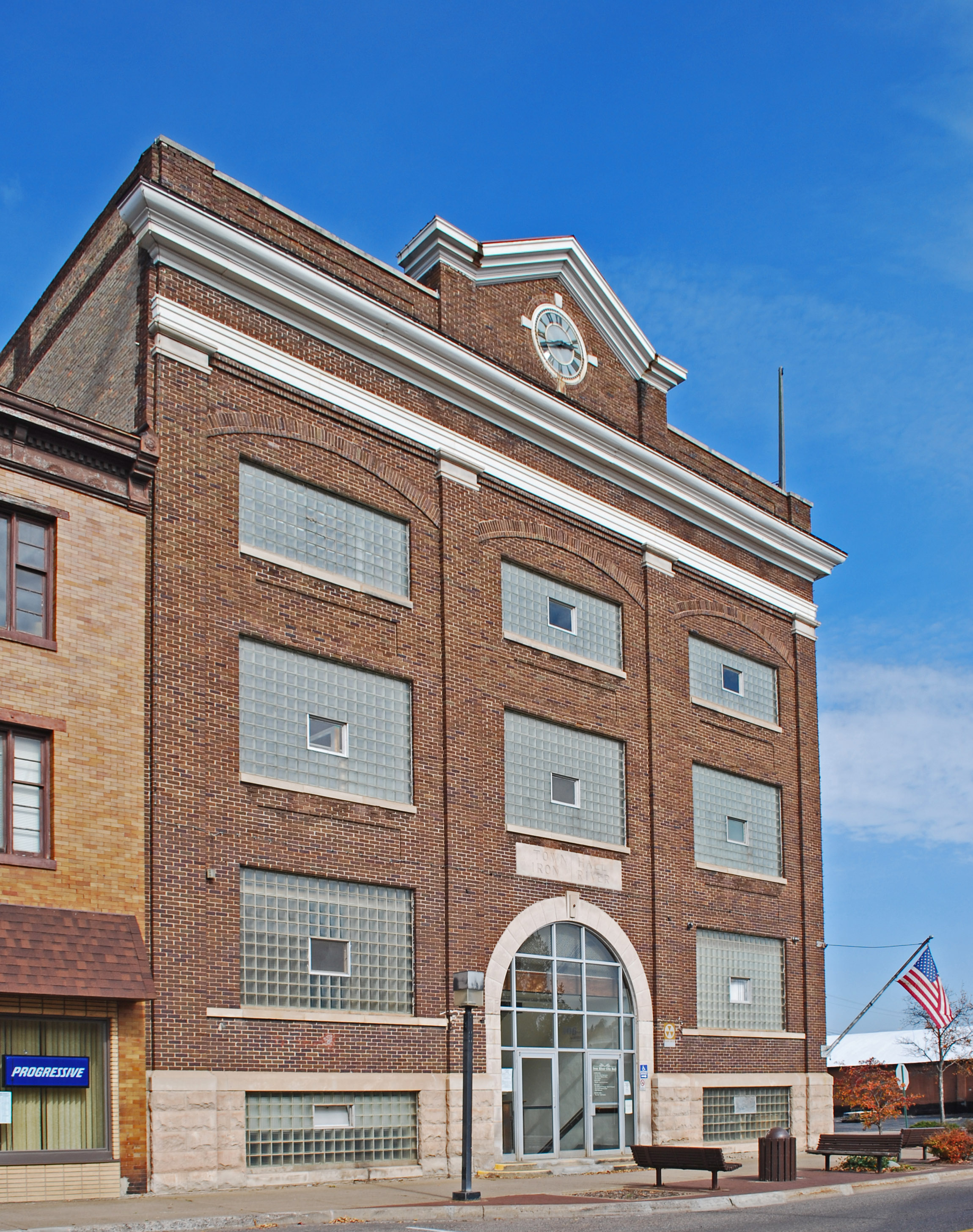
- Iron River City Hall (2010)

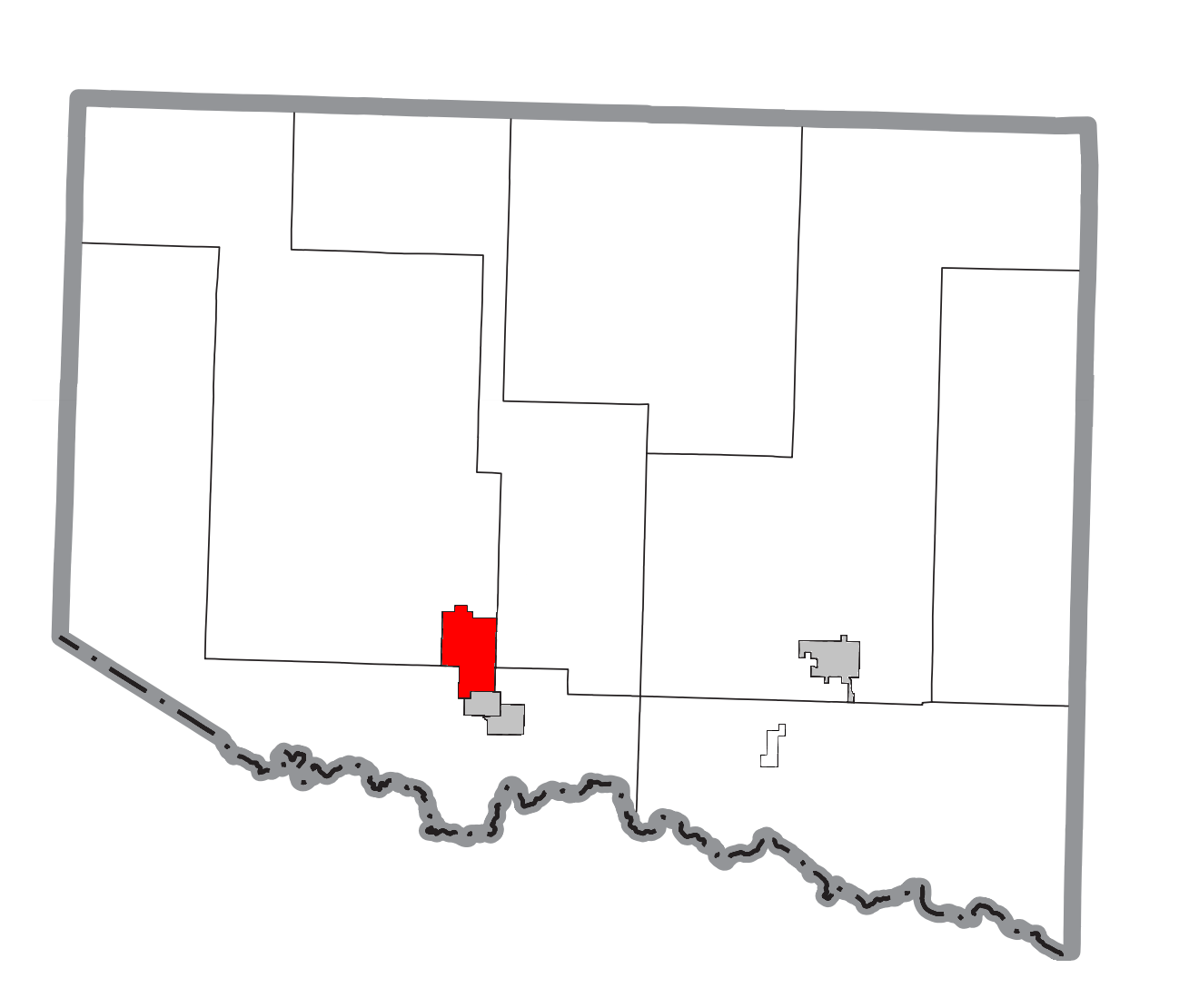
- Location within Iron County

- Location within the state of Michigan
- Coordinates: 46°5′47″N 88°38′26″W
- Country: United States
- State: Michigan
- County: Iron
- Incorporated: 1885 (village); 1926 (city)

Area
  - Total: 6.76 sq mi (17.50 km^{2})
  - Land: 6.74 sq mi (17.45 km^{2})
  - Water: 0.019 sq mi (0.05 km^{2})
- Elevation: 1,512 ft (461 m)

Population (2020)
  - Total: 3,007
  - Density: 446.4/sq mi (172.37/km^{2})
- Time zone: UTC-6 (Central (CST))
  - Summer (DST): UTC-5 (CDT)
- ZIP code: 49935
- Area code: 906
- FIPS code: 26-40980
- GNIS feature ID: 1620325
- Website: ironriver.org

Iron River is a city in the Upper Peninsula of Michigan and the largest city in Iron County. As of the 2020 census, the city's population was 3,007. The city is situated at the southeast corner of Iron River Township, though it is administratively autonomous.

== History ==
Originally settled in 1882 under the name 'Nanaimo', named after the Nanaimo iron mine, owned by the Mineral Hills Iron Company. In 1878, two brothers, Donald and Alexander MacKinnon acquired the site, and a village was platted and registered in 1881. The new town was given a station on the Chicago and North Western Railway and renamed 'Iron River' after the nearby Iron River. The settlement was incorporated as a village within Iron River Township in 1885, and as a city in 1926.

On November 2, 1999, the voters of the cities of Iron River and Stambaugh and the village of Mineral Hills approved consolidation into a new city, which continued the name Iron River. The consolidation became effective July 1, 2000.

== Geography ==
According to the United States Census Bureau, the city has a total area of 6.76 square miles (17.51 km^{2}), of which 6.74 square miles (17.46 km^{2}) is land and 0.02 square miles (0.05 km^{2}) is water.

The area is noted for its vast forest land, scenic lakes, and winter sports.

Iron River and the surrounding area is home of many lakes, and is not far from Lake Superior, the largest of the Great Lakes. In the summer, many people frequent the beaches, in the winter, there are often tents for ice fishing on the frozen lakes.

=== Climate ===
Climate data for Stambaugh, Michigan, 1991–2020 normals, extremes 1896–present
Month	Jan	Feb	Mar	Apr	May	Jun	Jul	Aug	Sep	Oct	Nov	Dec	Year
Record high °F (°C)	55 (13)	66 (19)	83 (28)	92 (33)	100 (38)	98 (37)	103 (39)	100 (38)	96 (36)	88 (31)	75 (24)	59 (15)	103 (39)
Mean maximum °F (°C)	38.9 (3.8)	46.7 (8.2)	58.7 (14.8)	72.7 (22.6)	82.8 (28.2)	87.4 (30.8)	87.8 (31.0)	86.7 (30.4)	82.9 (28.3)	74.9 (23.8)	57.1 (13.9)	44.0 (6.7)	90.4 (32.4)
Mean daily maximum °F (°C)	21.2 (−6.0)	25.5 (−3.6)	36.8 (2.7)	49.7 (9.8)	64.1 (17.8)	73.3 (22.9)	77.0 (25.0)	75.0 (23.9)	67.3 (19.6)	53.2 (11.8)	37.9 (3.3)	26.3 (−3.2)	50.6 (10.3)
Daily mean °F (°C)	10.7 (−11.8)	12.8 (−10.7)	23.1 (−4.9)	36.9 (2.7)	50.6 (10.3)	60.1 (15.6)	63.7 (17.6)	61.5 (16.4)	54.0 (12.2)	41.8 (5.4)	29.2 (−1.6)	17.4 (−8.1)	38.5 (3.6)
Mean daily minimum °F (°C)	0.3 (−17.6)	0.1 (−17.7)	9.4 (−12.6)	24.1 (−4.4)	37.2 (2.9)	46.8 (8.2)	50.4 (10.2)	47.9 (8.8)	40.8 (4.9)	30.5 (−0.8)	20.5 (−6.4)	8.5 (−13.1)	26.4 (−3.1)
Mean minimum °F (°C)	−24.4 (−31.3)	−25.0 (−31.7)	−16.9 (−27.2)	6.2 (−14.3)	21.6 (−5.8)	30.6 (−0.8)	36.9 (2.7)	34.5 (1.4)	26.3 (−3.2)	16.5 (−8.6)	−0.6 (−18.1)	−16.4 (−26.9)	−29.6 (−34.2)
Record low °F (°C)	−43 (−42)	−45 (−43)	−33 (−36)	−12 (−24)	10 (−12)	23 (−5)	27 (−3)	26 (−3)	15 (−9)	2 (−17)	−17 (−27)	−41 (−41)	−45 (−43)
Average precipitation inches (mm)	1.09 (28)	0.96 (24)	1.49 (38)	2.55 (65)	3.17 (81)	4.00 (102)	4.15 (105)	3.10 (79)	3.48 (88)	3.32 (84)	1.76 (45)	1.46 (37)	30.53 (776)
Average snowfall inches (cm)	14.6 (37)	12.5 (32)	8.7 (22)	7.4 (19)	0.3 (0.76)	0.0 (0.0)	0.0 (0.0)	0.0 (0.0)	0.0 (0.0)	2.1 (5.3)	8.2 (21)	13.6 (35)	67.4 (172.06)
Average extreme snow depth inches (cm)	15.1 (38)	17.5 (44)	14.8 (38)	7.8 (20)	0.4 (1.0)	0.0 (0.0)	0.0 (0.0)	0.0 (0.0)	0.0 (0.0)	1.2 (3.0)	5.5 (14)	10.6 (27)	20.4 (52)
Average precipitation days (≥ 0.01 in)	9.9	7.4	8.2	10.6	12.0	12.1	12.4	11.1	13.1	13.2	10.9	10.6	131.5
Average snowy days (≥ 0.1 in)	9.5	6.8	5.8	2.7	0.3	0.0	0.0	0.0	0.0	1.2	5.6	8.2	40.1
Source 1: NOAA
Source 2: National Weather Service

== Demographics ==
Historical population
Census	Pop.	Note	%±
1890	1,117		—
1900	1,482		32.7%
1910	2,450		65.3%
1920	4,295		75.3%
1930	4,665		8.6%
1940	4,416		−5.3%
1950	4,048		−8.3%
1960	3,754		−7.3%
1970	2,684		−28.5%
1980	2,426		−9.6%
1990	2,095		−13.6%
2000	1,929		−7.9%
2010	3,029		57.0%
2020	3,007		−0.7%
Note: Stambaugh and Mineral Hills were consolidated with Iron River in July 2000. Source for population: U.S. Decennial Census

=== 2020 census ===
As of the 2020 census, Iron River had a population of 3,007. The median age was 44.3 years. 22.1% of residents were under the age of 18 and 23.9% of residents were 65 years of age or older. For every 100 females there were 91.9 males, and for every 100 females age 18 and over there were 92.5 males age 18 and over.

0.0% of residents lived in urban areas, while 100.0% lived in rural areas.

There were 1,397 households in Iron River, of which 22.5% had children under the age of 18 living in them. Of all households, 32.6% were married-couple households, 25.3% were households with a male householder and no spouse or partner present, and 33.1% were households with a female householder and no spouse or partner present. About 43.2% of all households were made up of individuals and 22.5% had someone living alone who was 65 years of age or older.

There were 1,730 housing units, of which 19.2% were vacant. The homeowner vacancy rate was 2.9% and the rental vacancy rate was 11.6%.

Racial composition as of the 2020 census
Race	Number	Percent
White	2,789	92.8%
Black or African American	5	0.2%
American Indian and Alaska Native	24	0.8%
Asian	8	0.3%
Native Hawaiian and Other Pacific Islander	0	0.0%
Some other race	14	0.5%
Two or more races	167	5.6%
Hispanic or Latino (of any race)	83	2.8%

=== 2010 census ===
At the 2010 census there were 3,029 people, 1,446 households, and 764 families living in the city. The population density was 449.4 inhabitants per square mile (173.5/km^{2}). There were 1,770 housing units at an average density of 262.6 per square mile (101.4/km^{2}). The racial makeup of the city was 96.3% White, 0.2% African American, 1.2% Native American, 0.3% Asian, 0.1% Pacific Islander, 0.2% from other races, and 1.7% from two or more races. Hispanic or Latino of any race were 1.9%.

Of the 1,446 households, 22.5% had children under the age of 18 living with them, 36.7% were married couples living together, 12.3% had a single female householder, 3.8% had a single male householder, and 47.2% were non-families. 42.9% of households were one person, and 21.5% were one person aged 65 or older. The average household size was 2.02 and the average family size was 2.73.

The median age was 47.6 years. 19.6% of residents were under the age of 18; 6.8% were between the ages of 18 and 24; 20.4% were from 25 to 44; 28.5% were from 45 to 64; and 24.7% were 65 or older. The gender makeup of the city was 47.0% male and 53.0% female.

=== 2000 census ===
At the 2000 census there were 1,929 people, 876 households, and 487 families living in the city. The population density was 555.7 inhabitants per square mile (214.6/km^{2}). There were 988 housing units at an average density of 284.6 per square mile (109.9/km^{2}). The racial makeup of the city was 95.33% White, 0.16% African American, 1.92% Native American, 0.21% Asian, 0.05% from other races, and 2.33% from two or more races. 0.78% of the population were Hispanic or Latino of any race. 15.4% were of German, 13.4% Swedish, 13.2% Italian, 9.9% Polish, 7.8% English, 7.6% Finnish, 5.9% French and 5.1% Irish ancestry according to Census 2000. 98.3% spoke English as their first language. There were 876 households, 23.7% had children under the age of 18 living with them, 40.2% were married couples living together, 11.5% had a female householder with no husband present, and 44.4% were non-families. 40.3% of households were made up of individuals, and 23.7% had someone living alone who was 65 or older. The average household size was 2.09 and the average family size was 2.80.

The age distribution was 21.3% under the age of 18, 6.2% from 18 to 24, 20.8% from 25 to 44, 21.7% from 45 to 64, and 30.0% who were 65 or older. The median age was 47 years. For every 100 females, there were 81.5 males. For every 100 females age 18 and over, there were 80.2 males.

The median household income was $23,438 and the median family income was $33,942. Males had a median income of $28,083 versus $20,714 for females. The per capita income for the city was $15,728. 11.9% of the population and 6.5% of families were below the poverty line. Out of the total population, 12.5% of those under the age of 18 and 10.0% of those 65 and older were living below the poverty line.

== Education ==
The West Iron County Schools are based in Iron River.

== Transportation ==
=== Roads ===
- US 2 courses west to Ironwood and southeast to Crystal Falls and Iron Mountain.
- M-73 travels southwest to Wisconsin.
- M-189 runs near Caspian before continuing on to Wisconsin.

=== Airport ===
- Stambaugh Airport provides general aviation services to the city of Iron River and the surrounding county.

=== Bus ===
- Indian Trails provides daily intercity bus service between St. Ignace and Ironwood, Michigan.

=== Trail ===
- State Line Trail

== Notable people ==
- Nick Baumgartner (born 1981), American snowboarder
- Aileen Fisher (1906–2002), Children's writer, poet, playwright
- Dorthy Moxley (1932–2024), educator and crime victim advocate
- Carrie Jacobs-Bond (1862–1946), American singer, pianist, and songwriter.
- Dan Benishek (1952–2021), American physician and politician.

== See also ==
- Angeli Foods
