= Forest Park School District (Michigan) =

Michigan school district

Address
- 801 Forest Pkwy Crystal Falls, Iron County, Michigan, 49920; United States
- Coordinates: 46.0965851°N 88.3387862°W

District information
- Type: Public school district
- Motto: Where every child has a chance to shine.
- Grades: PK-12
- Superintendent: Michelle Thomson
- School board: 7 members
- Accreditation: Michigan Department of Education
- Schools: Forest Park School
- NCES District ID: 2611190

Students and staff
- Enrollment: 450
- Teachers: 30
- Staff: 20
- Student–teacher ratio: 14:1
- Athletic conference: MHSAA
- District mascot: Trojans
- Colors: Red and black

Other information
- Website: fptrojans.org

Forest Park School District is a Public School District in Iron County in Michigan's Upper Peninsula. The district covers serves a population of 4,320 across approximately 640 square miles, including the townships of Crystal Falls, Hematite, Mansfield, and Mastodon as well as the towns of Amasa, Alpha, and Crystal Falls. The school serves approximately 450 pre-kindergarten to twelfth grade students, who receive instruction in one building from 30 teachers for a student-teacher ratio of 14:1 as of 2019. As of 2022, the School District superintendent is Christy Larson.

== Demographics ==
According to Michigan's official education data source MI School Data, 54.7% of students attending Forest Park School District are economically disadvantaged. 93.69% of students identify as white, with the majority of the remaining students (4.5%) identifying as two or more races.

== Recognition ==
In 2014, the school district was placed in the top 9% of American high schools by US News and World Report, highlighting their above-average graduation rate.

In 2016, the Michigan Education Finance Study recognized Forest Park as one of 58 school districts in Michigan that reached above average academic standards to become "A Notably Successful School in Michigan."
