= Pentoga, Michigan =

- Unincorporated community
- Location within the state of Michigan
- Coordinates: 46°00′11″N 88°29′40″W
- Country: United States
- State: Michigan
- County: Iron
- Township: Stambaugh Township
- Elevation: 1,410 ft (430 m)
- Time zone: UTC-6 (Central (CST))
  - Summer (DST): UTC-5 (CDT)
- ZIP code: 49920
- Area code: 906
- GNIS feature ID: 2129433

Pentoga is an unincorporated community in Iron County, in the U.S. state of Michigan.

== History ==
A post office was established at Pentoga in 1900, and remained in operation until it was discontinued in 1937. The community was given its name by the owners of a local mill. It stemmed from the name of a Native American chief's wife; her tribe had made their home along the shore of Chicagon Lake before selling it and moving to the Lac Vieux Desert Indian Reservation.
