= Peavy Pond =

Lake in the state of Michigan, United States

- Location within Michigan Location within the United States
- Coordinates: 46°00′43″N 88°12′10″W
- Type: Reservoir
- Primary inflows: Michigamme River, Paint River
- Primary outflows: Michigamme River
- Basin countries: United States
- Surface area: 2,400 acres (970 ha)
- Surface elevation: 1,283 ft (391 m)
- Settlements: Mastodon Township

Peavy Pond is a 2,400 acres (970 ha) reservoir in Iron County, Michigan. The reservoir was created by the Peavy Falls Dam. Peavy Pond is part of the Menominee Drainage Basin. It flows from the dam, through the Michigamme River and the Menominee River into Lake Michigan.

== See also ==
- List of lakes in Michigan
