= Crystal Falls Dam and Power Plant =

- U.S. National Register of Historic Places
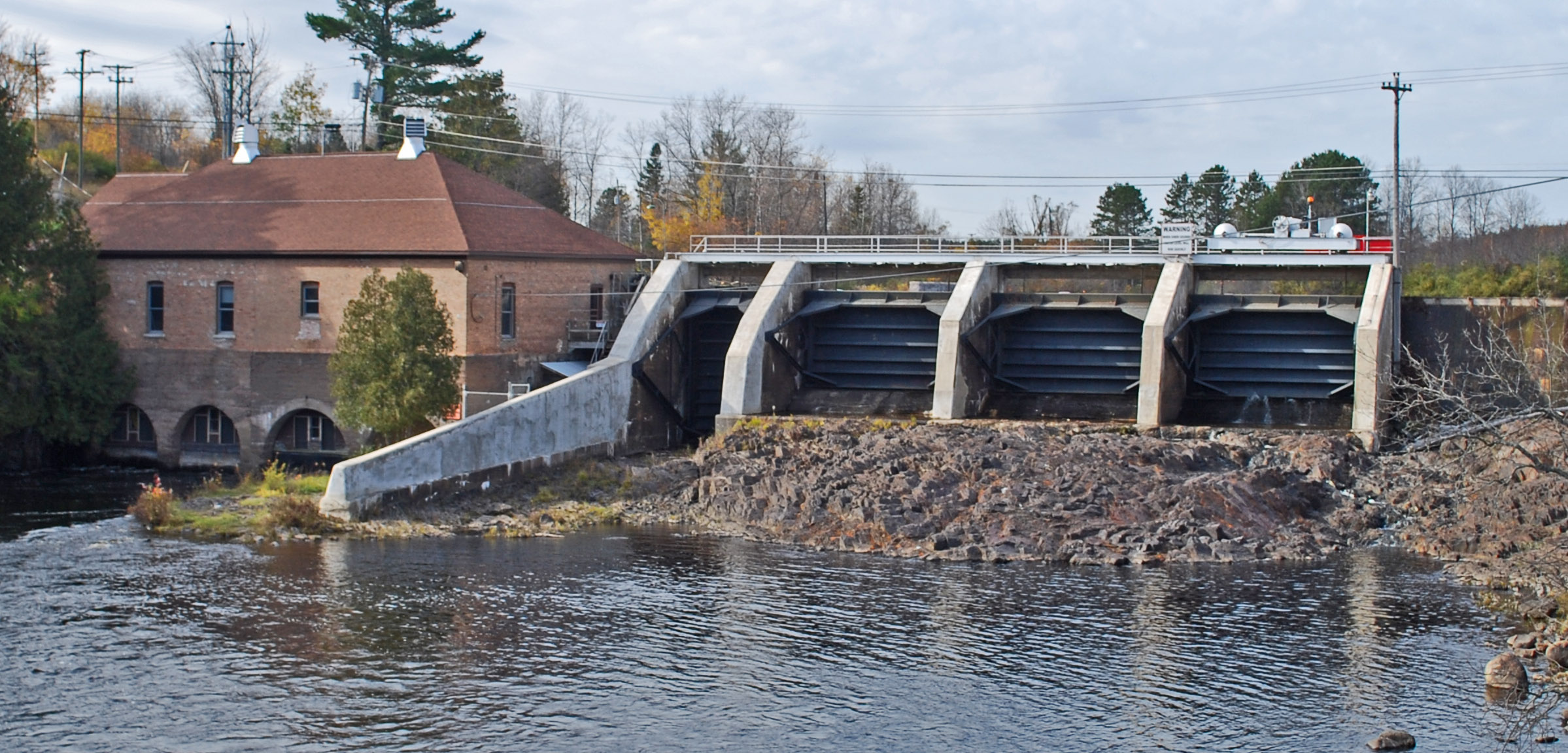

- Location within Michigan Location within the United States
- Interactive map
- Location: Paint River off Powerplant Road, Crystal Falls, Michigan
- Coordinates: 46°6′22″N 88°20′5″W
- Area: 1 acre (0.40 ha)
- Built: 1891
- MPS: Iron County MRA
- NRHP reference No.: 83003678
- Added to NRHP: December 22, 1983

The Crystal Falls Dam and Power Plant is a utility located on the Paint River off Powerplant Road, on the north side of Crystal Falls, Michigan. It was listed on the National Register of Historic Places in 1983.

== History ==
The section of the Paint River where the dam is now located was once a series of falls and rapids that gave Crystal Falls its name. However, in 1891, the village of Crystal Falls constructed the Crystal Falls dam and power plant, effectively submerging the rapids. They were leased to C.T. Roberts from 1891 to 1896, after which the village took over management of the plant. In 1902-1903, a new power plant was constructed. The plant was expanded in 1907, and new generators were installed in 1914 and 1924. The plant was expanded several times; however, the output could not keep up with demand, and starting in 1929, Crystal Falls purchased supplemental power from the Wisconsin Energy Corporation.

After 1929, the power plant and dam were upgraded multiple times, including a 1931 installation of a new concrete dam installed containing the rollway and tainter gates and a 1996 resurfacing of the spillway. The Crystal Falls Power Plant is still operational, and is likely the oldest hydro-electric plant still in operation in the Upper Peninsula. It provides roughly 1/3 of the power demanded by the residents of Crystal Falls.

== Description ==
The Crystal Falls Power Plant is a two-story structure measuring approximately thirty feet by sixty feet with a hipped roof. The power plant is constructed of yellow brick with sandstone trim and sits on a concrete foundation. The adjacent concrete dam spanning the Paint River measures approximately seventy-five feet long and fifteen feet high, and has four spillway sections.
