= Iron County Airport =

Public use airport in Michigan, United States

- IATA: none; ICAO: none; FAA LID: 50D

Summary
- Owner: Iron County
- Serves: Crystal Falls, Michigan
- Time zone: UTC−05:00 (-5)
  - Summer (DST): UTC−04:00 (-4)
- Elevation AMSL: 1,340 ft (410 m)
- Coordinates: 46°00′31″N 088°16′26″W
- Interactive map of Iron County Airport

Runways
| Direction | Length | | Surface |
| Direction | ft | m | Surface |
|---|---|---|---|
| 12/30 | 3,690 | 1,125 | Asphalt |
| 2/20 | 2,700 | 823 | Turf |

Statistics
- Aircraft operations (2022): 150
- Based aircraft (2023): 3

Iron County Airport (FAA LID: 50D) is a public-use airport located 6 miles southeast of Crystal Falls, Michigan. It is located in and owned by Iron County. It is open from April to December.

== History ==
Crystal Falls previously had an airport located northeast of the city center. It was named Dr. A.L. Haight Airport. As of 2023, the site of that airfield was being developed into housing.

== Facilities and aircraft ==
The airport has two runways. Runway 12/30 measures 3,690 x 50 ft (1,125 x 15 m) and has an asphalt surface, while runway 2/20 is 2,700 x 145 ft (823 x 44 m) and is turf.

The airport does not have a fixed-base operator, and no fuel is available.

For the 12-month period ending December 31, 2022, the airport had 150 aircraft operations, an average of 13 per month, all general aviation. In November 2023, there were 3 aircraft based at this airport, all 3 single-engine airplanes.

== Accidents and incidents ==
- On October 17, 2009, Gottelt Herbert R Kitfox IV was substantially damaged during a hard landing at Iron County Airport. The pilot stated that, immediately after liftoff, he was unable to move the control stick to the left of the center (neutral) position, although he was able to move the control stick to the right, forward, and aft without restriction. The pilot returned for landing; however, “at about 30 [feet] altitude the aircraft began to stall.” The airplane subsequently landed hard, separating the main landing gear. Both wings and the fuselage structure were substantially damaged during the event. The probable cause of the accident was found to be the pilot's inability to maintain control due to an undetermined problem affecting lateral control of the airplane.
- On May 16, 2012, a Cessna A185F ran off the runway and ground looped after two deer ran onto the runway.
- On June 2, 2017, a Piper PA18 overran the runway after landing at Iron County Airport.

== See also ==
- List of airports in Michigan
- Upper Peninsula of Michigan
