= U.S. Route 141 =

U.S. Highway in Michigan and Wisconsin

U.S. Route 141
- US 141 highlighted in red

Route information
- Auxiliary route of US 41
- Maintained by WisDOT and MDOT
- Length: 174.99 mi (Note: Total mileage is a summation of the state mileages.) (281.62 km)
- Existed: November 11, 1926–present
- Tourist routes: Lake Michigan Circle Tour

Major junctions
- South end: I-43 near Bellevue, Wisconsin
- I-41 in Howard, Wisconsin; US 41 from Howard to Abrams, Wisconsin; US 8 near Pembine, Wisconsin; US 2 from Quinnesec to Crystal Falls, Michigan
- North end: US 41 / M-28 near Covington, Michigan

Location
- Country: United States
- States: Wisconsin, Michigan
- Counties: Wisconsin Brown, Oconto, Marinette; Florence; Michigan Dickinson; Iron, Baraga

Highway system
- United States Numbered Highway System; List; Special; Divided
- Wisconsin State Trunk Highway System; Interstate; US; State; Scenic; Rustic
- Michigan State Trunkline Highway System; Interstate; US; State; Byways
← WIS 140	Wisconsin	→ WIS 142
← M-140	Michigan	→ M-142
← M-100	US 102	→ M-102

US Highway 141 (US 141) is a north–south United States Numbered Highway in the states of Wisconsin and Michigan. The highway runs north-northwesterly from an interchange with Interstate 43 (I-43) in Bellevue, Wisconsin, near Green Bay, to a junction with US 41/M-28 near Covington, Michigan. In between, it follows city streets in Green Bay and has a concurrent section with US 41 in Wisconsin. North of Green Bay, US 141 is either a freeway or an expressway into rural northern Wisconsin before downgrading to an undivided highway. In Michigan, US 141 is an undivided highway that runs through rural woodlands. The highway has two segments in each state; after running through Wisconsin for about 103 miles (166 km), it crosses into Michigan for approximately another eight miles (13 km). After that, it crosses back into Wisconsin for about 14 1/2 miles (23 km) before crossing the state line one last time. The northernmost Michigan section is about 43 1/2 miles (70 km), making the overall length about 169 miles (272 km).

When the US Highway System was formed on November 11, 1926, US 141 ran from Milwaukee to Green Bay, and one segment of the modern highway in Michigan was originally designated US Highway 102 (US 102). This other designation was decommissioned in 1928 when US 141 was extended north from Green Bay into Michigan. Michigan has rebuilt the highway in stages over the years to smooth out sharp curves in the routing. Since the 1960s, the section south of Green Bay has been converted into a freeway in segments. US 141 has ended southeast of Green Bay in Bellevue since the 1980s—the southern freeway segment was redesignated as I-43. The section north of Abrams, Wisconsin, was converted to a freeway in the opening years of the 21st century, with an additional divided-highway section opening a few years later.

== Route description ==
As a bi-state highway, US 141 is a state trunk highway in Wisconsin and a state trunkline highway in Michigan. In Wisconsin, the segment through the Green Bay area is not on the National Highway System (NHS), except for about four blocks along Broadway Avenue that is part of an intermodal connector with the Port of Green Bay. The NHS is a network of roads important to the country's economy, defense, and mobility. From the Green Bay suburb of Howard northward, including the entire length through Michigan, US 141 is a part of the NHS. From the I-43 interchange in Howard north to the split at Abrams, US 141 is also a part of the Lake Michigan Circle Tour (LMCT), a tourist route that surrounds Lake Michigan.

=== Green Bay to Niagara ===
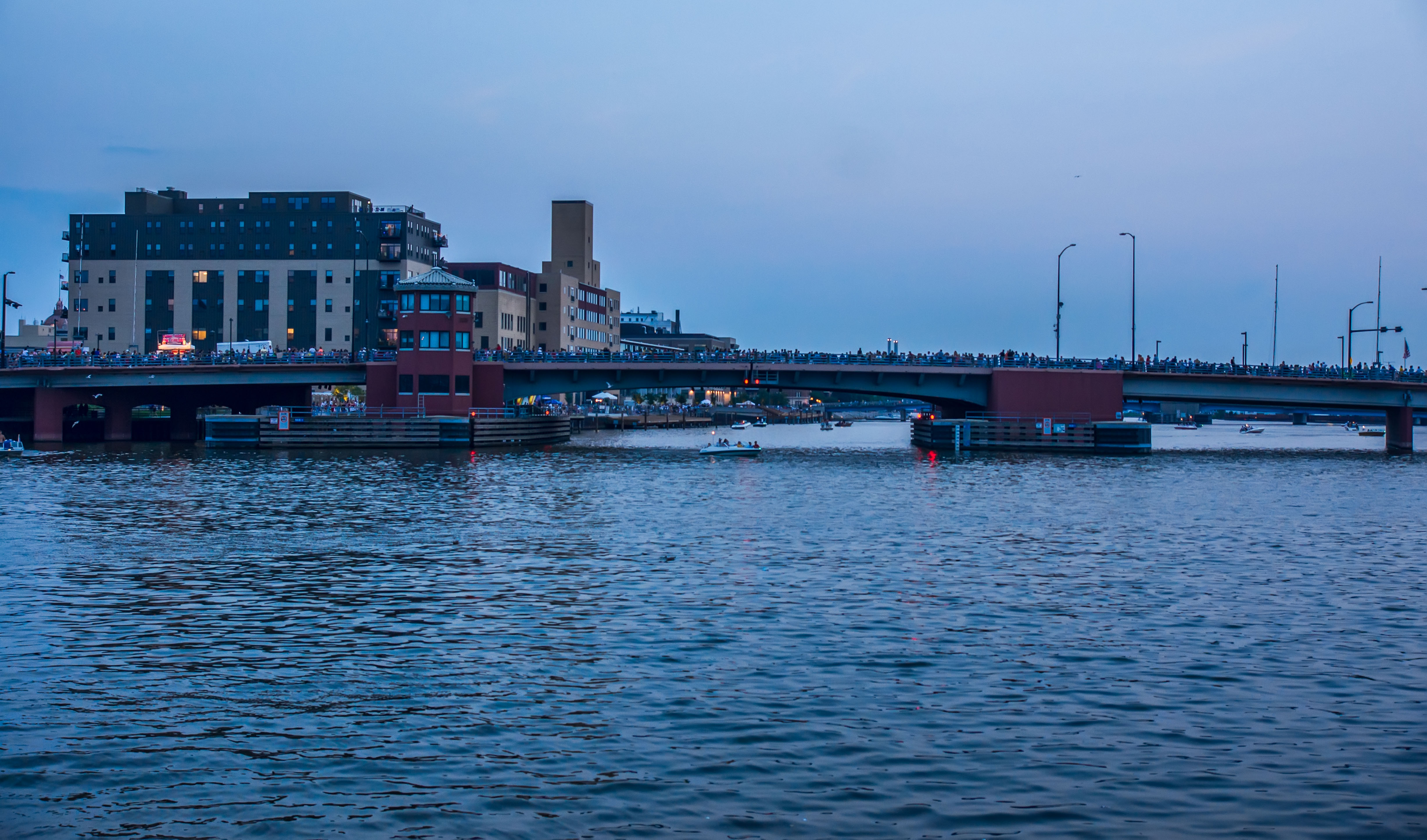
Ray Nitschke Memorial Bridge in Green Bay

US 141 starts at an interchange with I-43 southeast of Green Bay in the suburb of Bellevue. From the terminus at exit 178, US 141 runs north to Main Street, and then northwesterly along Main Street through town. Wisconsin Highway 29 (WIS 29) merges with US 141 at an intersection on the northwest side of Bellevue, and the two highways run concurrently through residential subdivisions. Main Street passes over I-43 and continues to the north and into the city of Green Bay. US 141/WIS 29 crosses Baird Creek and runs along the banks of the East River. At the intersection with Monroe Avenue, WIS 29 turns south, joining WIS 54/WIS 57 while US 141 continues westward on Main Street to cross the Fox River on the Ray Nitschke Memorial Bridge. On the west side of the river, the highway follows Dousman Street for a block before turning north along Broadway Avenue for four blocks. From there, the highway follows Mather Street west to Velp Avenue. US 141 follows that street northwesterly and parallel to I-43 on the north side of Green Bay. This area is mostly residential with some businesses immediately on either side. In the suburb of Howard, US 141 merges onto the I-41/US 41 freeway via the interchange at exit 170. I-41/US 41/US 141 has an interchange for I-43 just south of the Duck Creek crossing, where I-41 terminates.

From Howard northward, the freeway runs through suburban Brown County to Suamico, parallel to a line of the Escanaba and Lake Superior Railroad (ELS), through a mixture of farm fields and residential subdivisions. There are frontage roads on both sides of the freeway to provide access to the properties immediately adjacent to US 41/US 141. There are a number of interchanges with county-maintained roads between Suamico and Abrams in Oconto County. At Abrams, US 141 splits from US 41 and heads northward as an expressway while the latter freeway turns northeasterly. The landscape north of the split transitions to forest, and the freeway crosses the Oconto River in Stiles south of the interchange with WIS 22. The expressway bypasses Lena to the east. It crosses a railroad track at the surface and continues north through mixed farm fields and forest to the county line. North of the line, US 141 continues to the Marinette County communities of Coleman and Pound as an expressway. There is another grade railroad crossing at Pound. Through Coleman and Pound there is also a Business US 141. Past the latter town, US 141 transitions from expressway to a two-lane undivided highway.

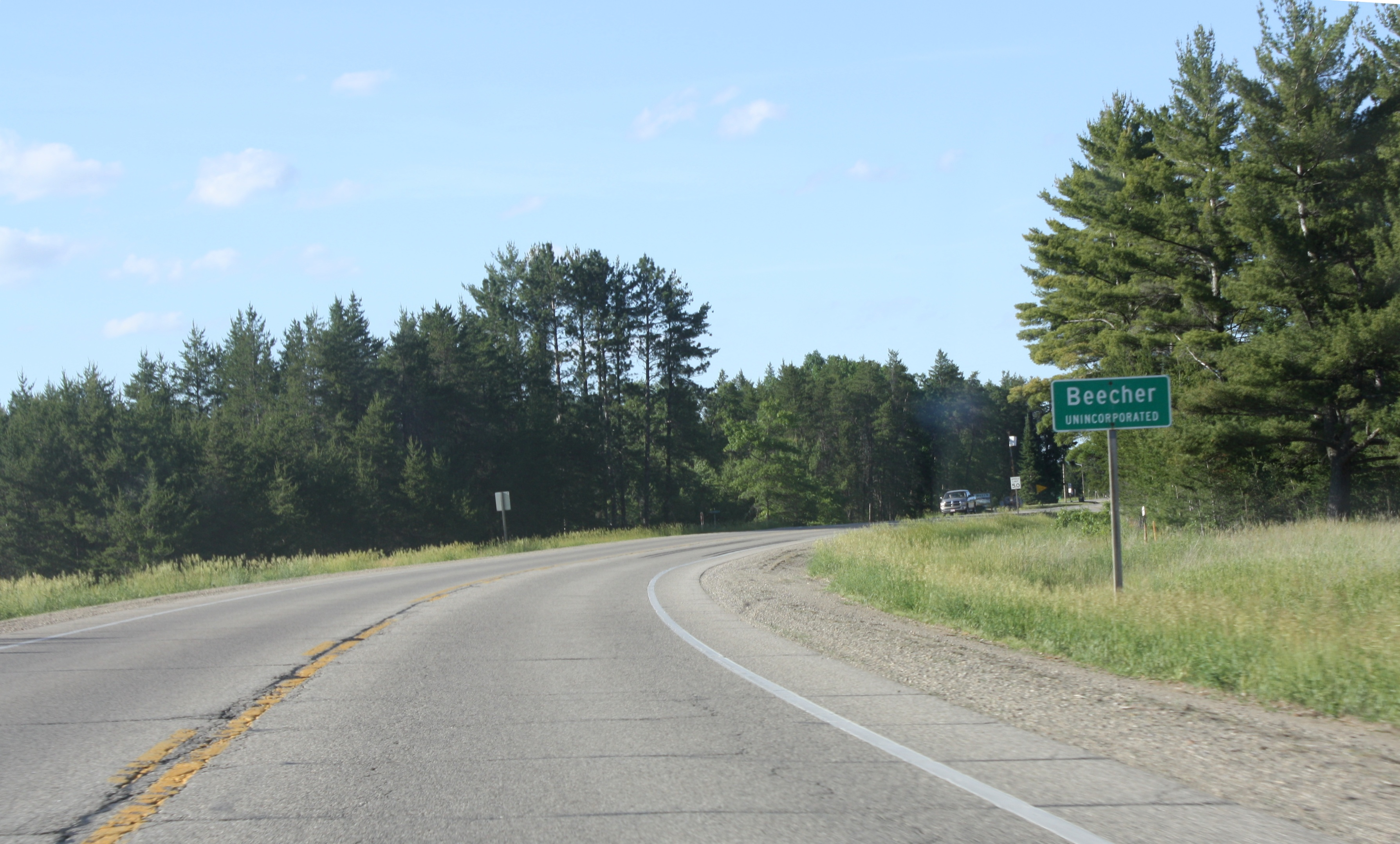
Headed northward into Beecher, Wisconsin

South of Crivitz, US 141 crosses the Peshtigo River. The highway crosses a branch line of the ELS on the east side of Crivitz and continues north through woodland to the community of Middle Inlet. North of town, the roadway turns northeasterly to the community of Wausaukee where it intersects WIS 180. From there, the highway passes through the communities of Amberg and Beecher before coming into Pembine, where US 8 merges in from the west. The two highways run concurrently north and northeasterly to an intersection southeast of Niagara. US 8 separates to the east, and US 141 turns northwesterly along River Street into Niagara. The highway then turns north along Roosevelt Road and over the Menominee River to exit the state of Wisconsin.

=== Quinnesec northward ===
Once in Michigan, one mile (1.6 km) west of Quinnesec, US 141 meets and joins US 2. The two highways run concurrently westward into Iron Mountain along Stephenson Avenue, passing through a retail business corridor and into downtown. M-95 joins the two highways, and all three pass Lake Antoine. M-95 turns off north of town and US 2/US 141 crosses the Menominee River back into Wisconsin.

US 2/US 141 makes a 14.5-mile (23.3 km) run through Florence County, passing the Spread Eagle Chain of Lakes. The highway serves the communities of Spread Eagle and Florence. The only junction with another state trunk highway in Wisconsin on the northern section is with the concurrent highways WIS 70/WIS 101 in Florence. The highway crosses back into Michigan on a bridge over the Brule River south of Crystal Falls.

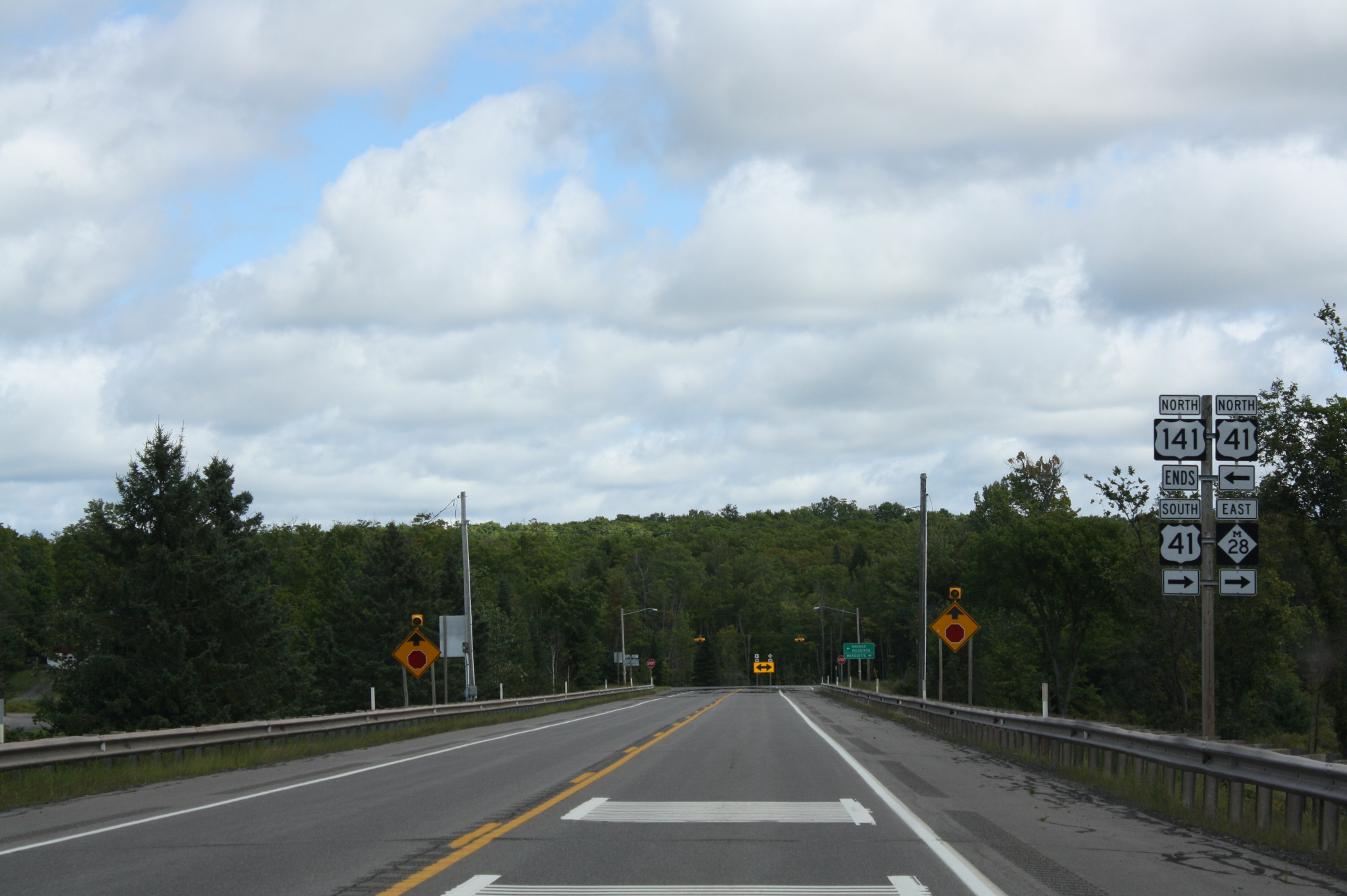
Northern terminus

Across the state line, the trunkline runs through forest near several smaller bodies of water such as Stager, Kennedy, and Railroad lakes. The highway enters Crystal Falls on 5th Street. US 2/US 141 runs along the top of the hill in town and intersects the western terminus of M-69 next to the Iron County Courthouse. US 141 continues westward on Crystal Avenue and separates from the US 2 concurrency on the western edge of town. Running north and northwesterly, US 141 passes to the east of the Ottawa National Forest through rural Iron County. The highway crosses the Paint River and continues through forest to the community of Amasa. The trunkline crosses the Hemlock River on the west side of town. From there, US 141 runs northward into the southwest corner of Baraga County and also enters the Eastern Time Zone. West of Worm Lake, US 141 meets M-28 in the community of Covington. The two highways merge and run easterly for about four miles (6.4 km) before US 141 terminates at US 41; M-28 continues eastward, merging with US 41.

== History ==
=== Initial state highways ===
In 1918, when Wisconsin initially numbered its highway system, the route of what later became US 141 followed two separate state highways: WIS 17 from downtown Milwaukee to Manitowoc and WIS 16 from Manitowoc north to Green Bay. Segments that later became US 141 in Wisconsin were numbered WIS 15 between Green Bay and Abrams, and WIS 38 between Abrams and Wausaukee. North of Wausaukee, the future US Highway was an unnumbered secondary highway. In 1919, Michigan signed its highway system, but the state did not have a highway running south from Quinnesec to the state line. The highway from Quinnesec into Iron Mountain was part of M-12. The segment through Florence County, Wisconsin, was WIS 69, and from the Crystal Falls area north to Covington, the M-69 moniker was used. In 1919, the WIS 38 designation was extended northward to Niagara and the state line. The highway was straightened to eliminate a series of sharp curves between Crivitz and Beaver in 1921. The same year, WIS 17 was realigned between Sheboygan and Cedar Grove to run via Oostburg. WIS 17 was also realigned in 1922 to follow a separate routing south of Port Washington; previously it was routed concurrently with WIS 57 in the area. By 1924, maps showed an unnumbered roadway running south from Quinnesec to connect with WIS 57 at the state line.

=== Conversion to a US Highway ===
US Highway 102
- Location: Crystal Falls–Covington, MI
- Length: 44.094 mi (70.962 km)
- Existed: November 11, 1926– November 12, 1928

As originally proposed in 1925, several US Highways in Wisconsin and Michigan's Upper Peninsula were to be designated. However, the routings for two highways were different in Michigan in 1925 than on the final 1926 map. In the original plan, US 102 was supposed to replace M-15 from US 2 at Rapid River, continue via Marquette to Humboldt, and the highway between Crystal Falls and Covington was not included in the system. However, when the final plan was approved and implemented on November 11, 1926, US 41 took the eastern routing through Rapid River and Marquette, and US 102 was routed between Crystal Falls and Covington. In both plans, US 141 was only routed between Milwaukee and Green Bay, replacing WIS 17 and WIS 16. At the time the two US Highways were created, WIS 57 was left untouched between Abrams and Niagara. The next year, the M-57 designation was assigned to connect WIS 57 to Quinnesec, and US 8 was extended to follow US 141 to US 2 near Iron Mountain.

On November 12, 1928, the extension of US 141 northward from Green Bay along WIS 57 to the Michigan state line had been approved; the signage was readied for installation the previous month. The US 102 designation was decommissioned when US 141 was also extended to replace M-57 from the state line, along US 2 to Crystal Falls and north to Covington. US 8's eastern end was rerouted along a separate bridge over the Menominee River to a new terminus at an intersection with US 2 in Norway in 1929. US 141 was fully paved in Wisconsin in the early 1930s; the last segment to be completed was between Pound and Abrams.

The next major changes were made at the beginning of the 1930s in Michigan. A realignment in the Iron Mountain area shifted US 2/US 141 to a new bridge over the Menominee River between 1932 and 1934. In 1940, a new routing from the state line north to Crystal Falls was opened; the previous routing was returned to local control. The northern end was relocated near Covington in late 1948 or early 1949 when US 41 was realigned in the area. This terminus was shifted again when US 141/M-28 was realigned in the area in late 1955 or early 1956.

=== Freeway era ===
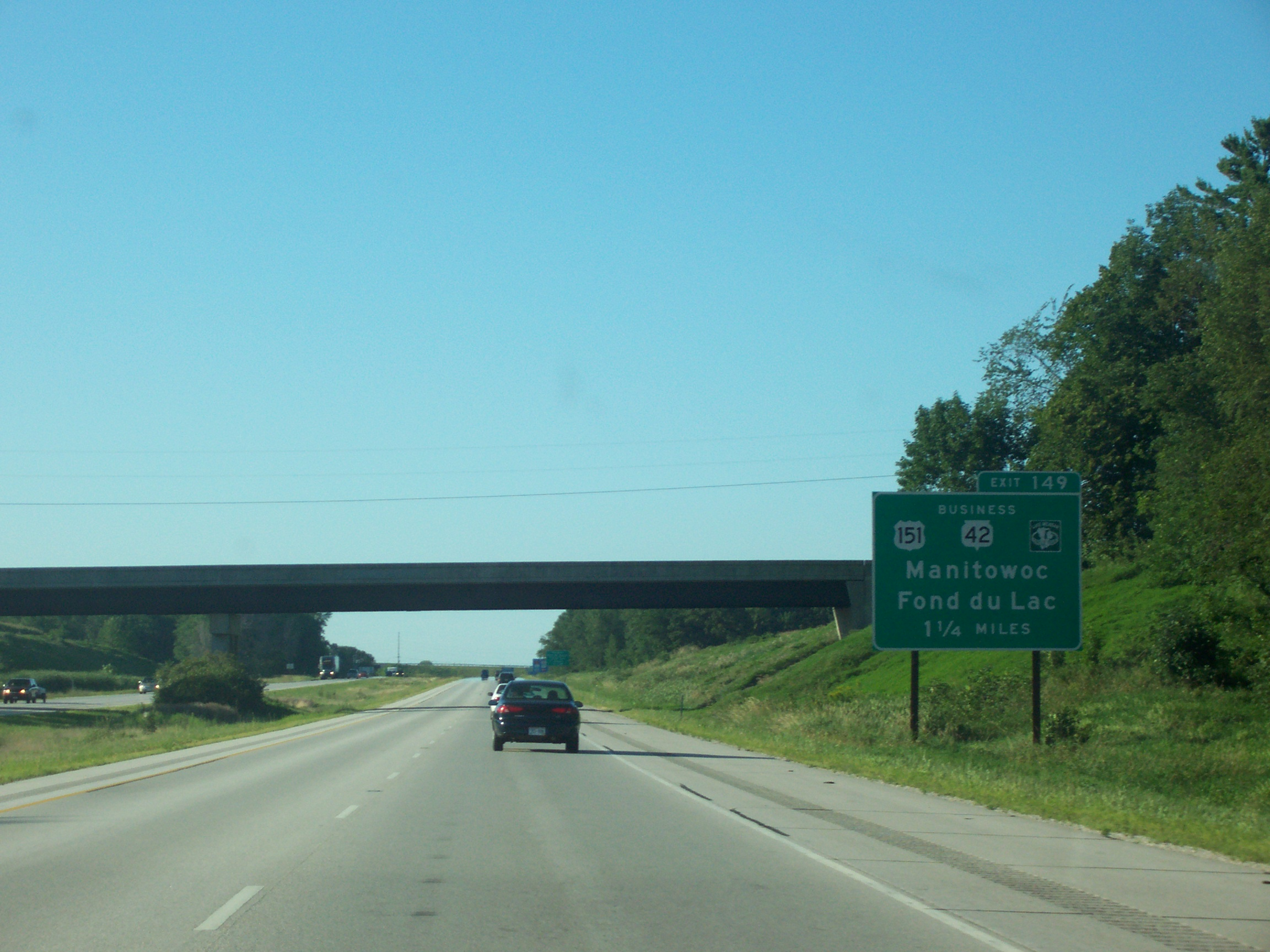
I-43 near Manitowoc, originally part of US 141

At about the same time as the realignments in Michigan, two-lane bypasses of Manitowoc and Port Washington in Wisconsin were opened in 1957. The state built a divided-highway segment that opened the following year running from the Milwaukee area northward to the Ozaukee–Milwaukee county line. The highway was rerouted to run further inland, bypassing Haven, Wisconsin, in 1959. In late 1961, the highway in Michigan was rebuilt in northern Iron and southern Baraga counties between Amasa and Covington as the state smoothed out sharp corners in the routing and finished paving US 141; a similar project was completed in 1972 south of Amasa to Crystal Falls.

Wisconsin proposed an addition to the Interstate Highway System in the 1950s to connect Green Bay, the state's third-largest city, to the system. Variations on this proposal included using either the US 41 or US 141 corridors, or a new corridor in between. This request was rejected in the 1950s, but it was approved in the 1960s. After approval, the state started the process to convert US 141 between Milwaukee and Abrams into a freeway. The first segments of freeway were opened in the Milwaukee area, starting in 1963 between Locust Street and Good Hope Road. The following year, an extension of the freeway opened southward from Locust to North Avenue. By 1965, the bypass of Sheboygan was opened; the Milwaukee area freeway was extended northward to Brown Deer Road the following year. Another freeway segment in the Milwaukee area opened in 1967, extending northward to Grafton in Ozaukee County. The last section of US 141 in the city of Milwaukee to open as a freeway was completed in 1968 when I-94 was finished through downtown; at the same time, US 141 was extended southward from North Avenue to meet I-94.

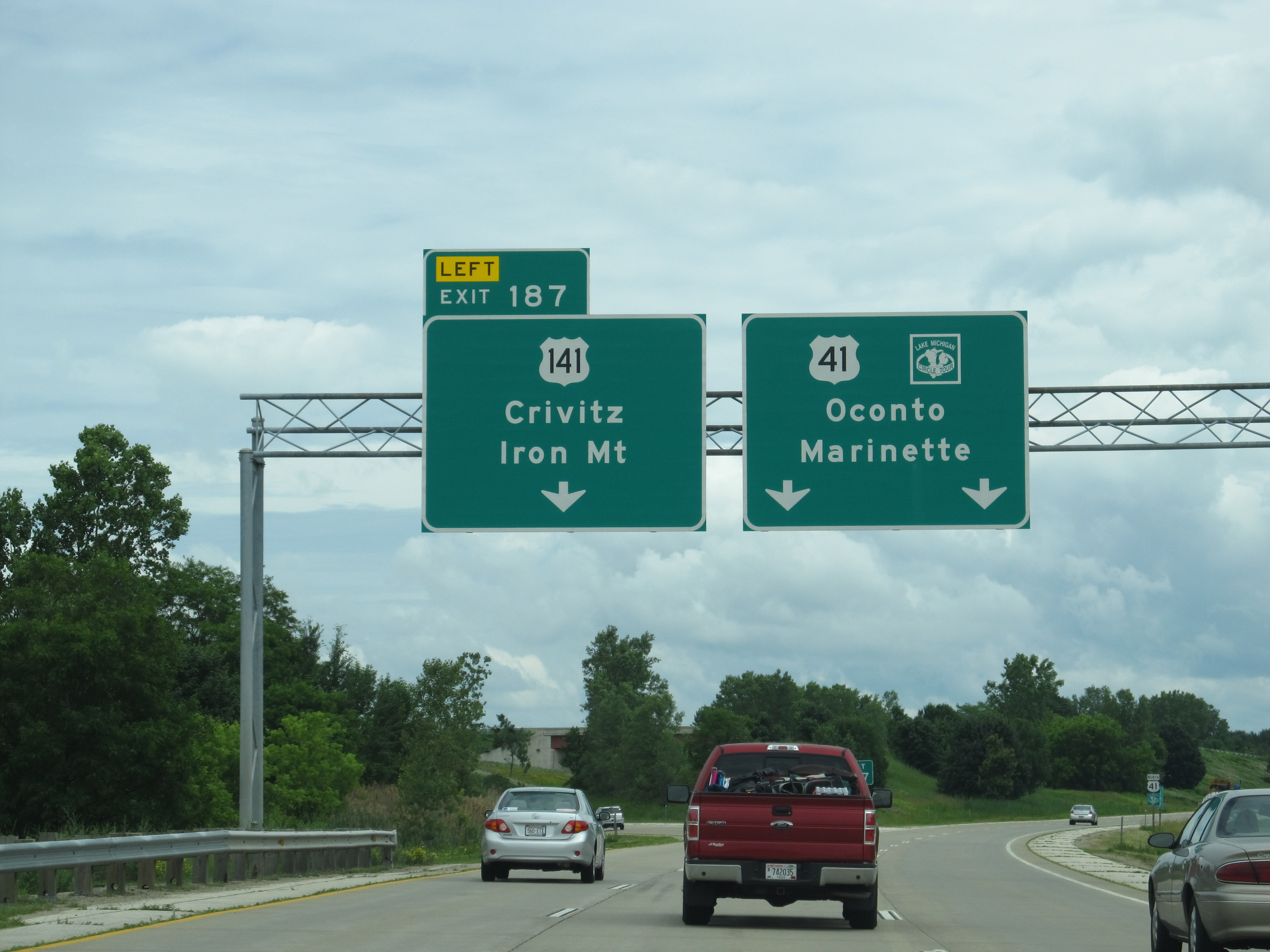
Northbound approaching the US 41/US 141 split at Abrams

Another freeway section from north of Green Bay to Suamico was opened in 1971. In 1972, the divided-highway segment between Suamico and Abrams opened, and the state started the construction of additional freeways between Green Bay and Milwaukee. The bypasses of Sheboygan and Cedar Grove were converted to full freeways in 1973. Another segment of freeway opened in 1975 that bypassed Port Washington and connected the freeway sections that ended near Grafton and Cedar Grove. I-43 was first designated on the 1978 official state highway map along US 141 from Milwaukee to Sheboygan; missing segments of I-43 between Green Bay and Milwaukee are shown as either under construction or proposed. In November of that year, the nine-mile (14 km) section bypassing Maribel opened. In October 1980, the 33-mile (53 km) segment of freeway between Sheboygan and Denmark opened. At the same time, the northern bypass of Green Bay was under construction and I-43/US 141 was open from Maribel to Branch northwest of Manitowoc; US 141 was truncated to end at the northern end of the Sheboygan bypass. I-43 was initially completed in 1981, and the southern terminus of US 141 was moved again, truncating the highway to end in Bellevue by 1983.

In 1986, the states in the Great Lakes region created the LMCT as part of a larger program of tourist routes in the region; US 141 carries the LMCT between the northern I-43 junction in the Green Bay area north to the split with US 41 at Abrams. In the first years of the 21st century, US 141 was expanded to a four-lane expressway northward from Abrams to Oconto Falls. A further project in 2006 expanded the highway to four-lanes northward to Beaver. Ths particular project cost $68.1 million for 16 miles of roadway. Based on the cost and traffic projections, this project was included in WisPIRGs list of highway boondoggles. On April 7, 2015, the segment of US 141 that runs concurrently with US 41 on the west side of Green Bay was designated a part of I-41 by the Federal Highway Administration.

In the 2020s, the US 141 corridor south of Iron Mountain was designated as an Alternative Fuel Corridor for electric vehicles.

== Major intersections ==
State	County	Location	mi (Note: Mileage numbers reset at the Michigan–Wisconsin state line crossings.)	km	Exit	Destinations	Notes
Wisconsin	Brown	Town of Ledgeview	0.00– 0.19	0.00– 0.31		I-43 – Milwaukee, Green Bay; CTH-MM (Elm View Road)	Exit 178 on I-43; roadway continues southward as CTH-MM
Wisconsin	Brown	Town of Ledgeview	0.81	1.30		WIS 29 east – Kewaunee	Eastern end of WIS 29 concurrency
Wisconsin	Brown	Green Bay	7.75	12.47		WIS 29 west / WIS 54 / WIS 57 / Alt. I-43 (North Monroe Avenue) – Algoma, Sturgeon Bay, Shawano	Western end of WIS 29 concurrency; eastern end of Alt. I-43 concurrency
Wisconsin	Brown	Green Bay	9.70– 9.71	15.61– 15.63		Alt. I-43 (Atkinson Drive) to I-43	Western end of Alt. I-43 concurrency; roundabout
Wisconsin	Brown	Green Bay–Howard city line	11.09– 11.11	17.85– 17.88		Military Avenue	Former Bus. US 41; roundabout
Wisconsin	Brown	Howard	12.14	19.54	170A	I-41 south / US 41 south – Appleton; CTH-HS (Velp Avenue north)	Southern end of I-41/US 41 concurrency; exit numbers follow US 41's mileage
Wisconsin	Brown	Howard	12.57	20.23	170B	I-41 south I-43 south / LMCT south – Milwaukee	Northern end of I-41 concurrency; southern end of LMCT concurrency; northern termini of I-41 and I-43; I-43 exit 192; northbound US 141 has no access southbound I-43
Wisconsin	Brown	Howard–Suamico village line	14.52	23.37	173	CTH-M (Lineville Road)	
Wisconsin	Brown	Suamico	17.56– 17.59	28.26– 28.31	176	CTH-B (Sunset Beach Road)	
Wisconsin	Brown–Oconto county line	Suamico–Little Suamico village line	20.54	33.06	179	Brown Road	
Wisconsin	Oconto	Town of Little Suamico	23.55	37.90	182	CTH-S	
Wisconsin	Oconto	Town of Abrams	26.59	42.79	185	CTH-D (Sampson Road)	
Wisconsin	Oconto	Town of Abrams	28.18	45.35	187	US 41 north / LMCT north – Oconto, Marinette	Northern end of US 41/LMCT concurrency; left exits and entrances
Wisconsin	Oconto	Town of Stiles	35.19– 35.23	56.63– 56.70	—	WIS 22 – Oconto Falls, Gillett, Oconto	Diamond interchange
Wisconsin	Oconto	Town of Lena	39.77	64.00	—	CTH-A – Lena	Diamond interchange
Wisconsin	Oconto–Marinette county line	Lena–Pound town line	44.90	72.26	Northern end of freeway; southern end of expressway		
Wisconsin	Marinette	Coleman	47.50	76.44	—	Bus. US 141 north / CTH-B – Coleman, Pound	Diamond interchange; Bus. US 141 only signed northbound
Wisconsin	Marinette	Town of Beaver	51.78	83.33	—	WIS 64 / Bus. US 141 south – Marinette, Pound, Antigo	Diamond interchange; Bus. US 141 only signed southbound
Wisconsin	Marinette	Town of Beaver	52.90	85.13	Northern end of expressway		
Wisconsin	Marinette	Crivitz	60.65	97.61		CTH-A north / CTH-W – Athelstane	Former western terminus for WIS 158
Wisconsin	Marinette	Wausaukee	70.41	113.31		WIS 180 south – Marinette	
Wisconsin	Marinette	Town of Pembine	88.83	142.96		US 8 west – Goodman, Rhinelander	Southern end of US 8 concurrency
Wisconsin	Marinette	Town of Niagara	98.35	158.28		US 8 east – Norway	Northern end of US 8 concurrency
Menominee River			102.94 0.000	165.67 0.000		State line	
Michigan	Dickinson	Breitung Township	1.138	1.831		US 2 east – Escanaba	Eastern end of US 2 concurrency
Michigan	Dickinson	Iron Mountain	3.985	6.413		M-95 south – Kingsford	Southern end of M-95 concurrency
Michigan	Dickinson	Breitung Township	7.393	11.898		M-95 north – Sagola, Republic, Marquette	Northern end of M-95 concurrency
Menominee River			8.020 0.00	12.907 0.00		State line	
Wisconsin	Florence	Town of Florence	10.59	17.04		WIS 70 west / WIS 101 south – Eagle River, Armstrong Creek	
Brule River			14.50 0.000	23.34 0.000		State line	
Michigan	Iron	Crystal Falls	10.029	16.140		M-69 east – Sagola	Western terminus of M-69
Michigan	Iron	Crystal Falls Township	11.120	17.896		US 2 west – Iron River, Ironwood	Northern end of US 2 concurrency
Michigan	Baraga	Covington	45.382	73.035		M-28 west – Wakefield	Western end of M-28 concurrency
Michigan	Baraga	Covington Township	49.536	79.720		US 41 / M-28 east / LSCT – Baraga, Houghton, Marquette	Eastern end of M-28 concurrency
1.000 mi = 1.609 km; 1.000 km = 0.621 mi: Concurrency terminus

== Business routes ==
Three business routes of US 141 have existed. Two of these routes have been decommissioned.

=== Coleman–Pound ===
Business U.S. Highway 141
- Location: Coleman–Pound
- Length: 4.5 mi (7.2 km)
- Existed: 2006–present

Business U.S. Highway 141 (Bus. US 141) is a business loop of US 141 that runs through the communities of Coleman and Pound. The loop follows County Trunk Highway B (CTH-B) northeasterly from the US 141 expressway into downtown Coleman and then turns northward near Coleman High School. Bus. US 141 continues northward into Pound, crossing the Peshtigo River in between the two communities. North of Pound, the loop crosses over US 141 on 21st Road and continues to an intersection with WIS 64. The business loop follows WIS 64 back to an interchange on US 141 northwest of Pound where the loop terminates.

In 2006, the US 141 expressway was extended northward near Beaver, and the former route of US 141, plus a connector roadway southwest of downtown Coleman was designated as a business loop. This route does not appear on the official Wisconsin Department of Transportation maps, so it is a locally designated business loop under local maintenance.

=== Manitowoc ===
Business U.S. Highway 141
- Location: Manitowoc
- Existed: 1975–1980

Business U.S. Highway 141 (Bus. US 141) was a business loop of US 141 that was signed along US 151 and US 10 through downtown Manitowoc. The route was created in 1975, and decommissioned in 1980.

=== Sheboygan ===
Business U.S. Highway 141
- Location: Sheboygan, Wisconsin
- Existed: early 1970s–1980

Business U.S. Highway 141 (Bus. US 141) was a business loop of US 141 that served downtown Sheboygan. The route was created when an expressway bypass of Sheboygan was finished in the early 1970s, and replaced with a business loop of WIS 42 when I-43 was finished and US 141 was truncated in 1980.
