= Hagerman Lake =

Hagerman Lake can refer to

== United States ==
- Hagerman Lake (Michigan), a lake in Iron County, Michigan
- Hagerman Lake, a public water supply, in Armstrong Township, Lycoming County, Pennsylvania
- Hagerman Lake, a lake in Lake County, Colorado

== Canada ==
- Hagerman Slough, a slough in Manitoba, Canada at 49° 51′ 38″ N, 100° 47′ 22″ W
