= Michigamme River =

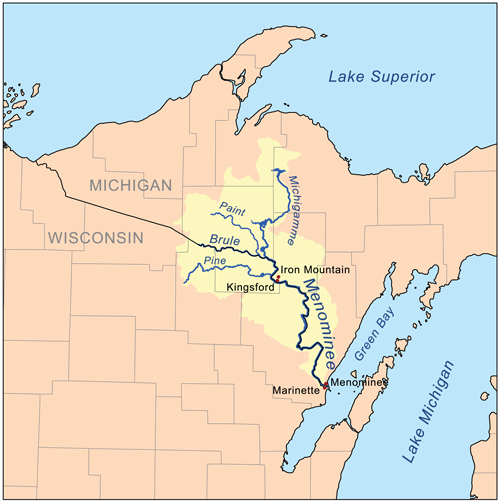

Location
- Country: United States
- State: Michigan

Physical characteristics
- Mouth
  - coordinates: 45.9532863°N 88.1954106°W
- Length: 67.0 mi (107.8 km)

The Michigamme River (/ˈmɪʃəɡɒmi/ mish-ə-GAH-mee) is a 67.0-mile-long (107.8 km) tributary of the Menominee River on the Upper Peninsula of Michigan in the United States. Via the Menominee River, its water flows to Lake Michigan.

The Michigamme River flows from Lake Michigamme in Marquette County, through Dickinson County, Michigamme Reservoir, Peavy Pond and Michigamme Lake in Iron County to its confluence with the Brule River, forming the Menominee River. The confluence can be viewed from the dam on Michigamme Lake. In addition, there is a spillway from the Paint River which flows into Peavy Pond.

== See also ==
- Mansfield Township, Michigan
- Republic Island
