= Stambaugh Township, Michigan =

- Civil township
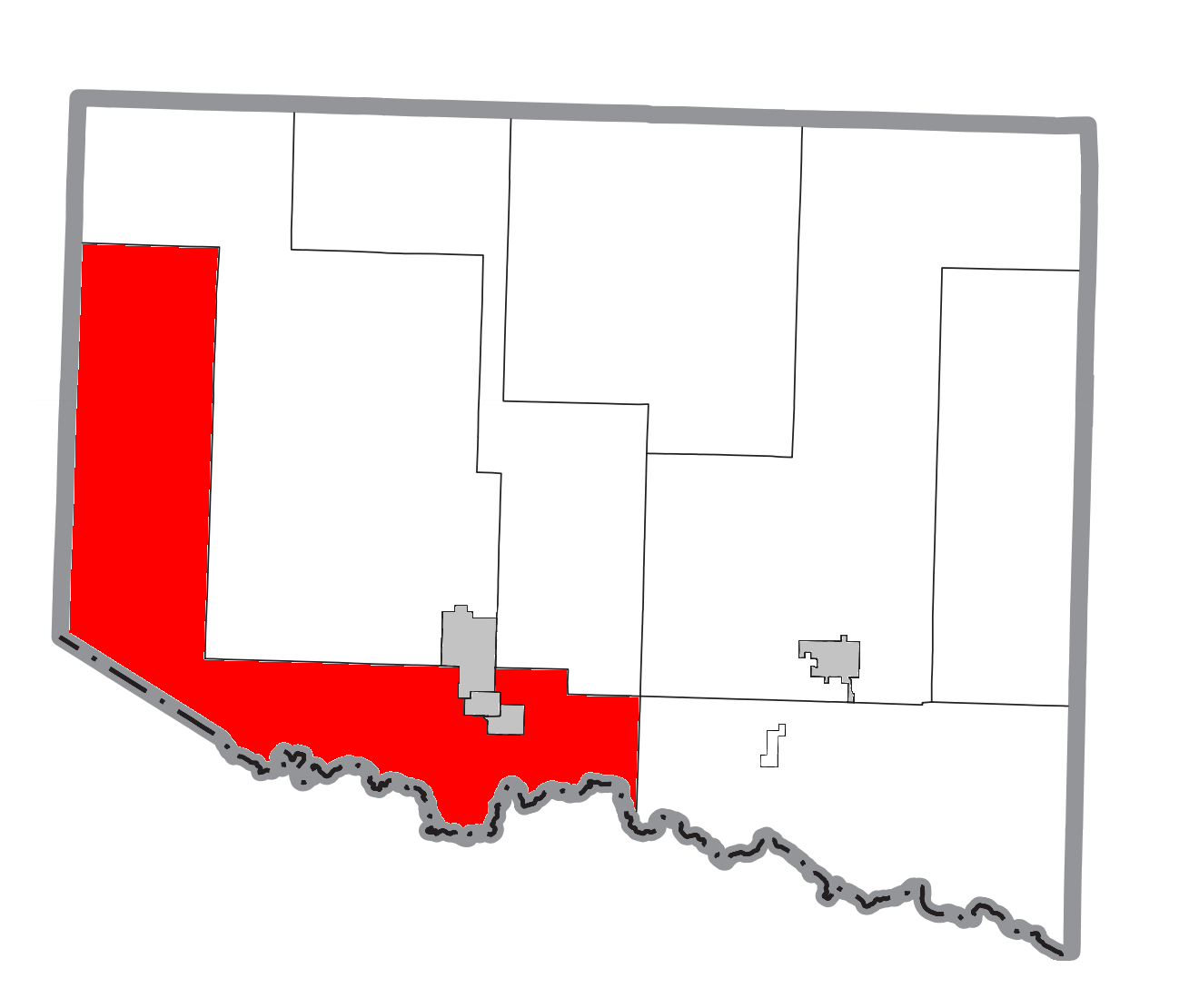
- Location within Iron County

- Location within the state of Michigan
- Coordinates: 46°10′3″N 88°52′24″W
- Country: United States
- State: Michigan
- County: Iron

Area
  - Total: 190.1 sq mi (492.3 km^{2})
  - Land: 181.8 sq mi (470.8 km^{2})
  - Water: 8.3 sq mi (21.5 km^{2})
- Elevation: 1,667 ft (508 m)

Population (2020)
  - Total: 1,200
  - Density: 7.0/sq mi (2.7/km^{2})
- Time zone: UTC-6 (Central (CST))
  - Summer (DST): UTC-5 (CDT)
- ZIP code: 49964
- Area code: 906
- FIPS code: 26-76080
- GNIS feature ID: 1627117
- Website: https://stambaughtownship.org/

Stambaugh Township is a civil township of Iron County in the U.S. state of Michigan. The population was 1,140 according to the 2010 census, and 1,200 in 2020.

== Geography ==
According to the United States Census Bureau, the township has a total area of 190.1 square miles (492 km^{2}). Land accounts for 181.8 square miles (471 km^{2}) and water for 8.3 square miles (21 km^{2}). Stambaugh Township lies along the Michigan-Wisconsin border.

Stambaugh Township has many lakes within its borders. Chicagon Lake, Hagerman Lake, Lake Ottawa, and Brule Lake are in the south and east. Smoky Lake, Golden Lake, and Tamarack Lake are in the west

=== Climate ===
Climate data for Stambaugh 2SSE, Michigan (1991–2020 normals, extremes 1896–present)
Month	Jan	Feb	Mar	Apr	May	Jun	Jul	Aug	Sep	Oct	Nov	Dec	Year
Record high °F (°C)	55 (13)	64 (18)	83 (28)	92 (33)	100 (38)	98 (37)	103 (39)	100 (38)	96 (36)	88 (31)	75 (24)	59 (15)	103 (39)
Mean daily maximum °F (°C)	21.2 (−6.0)	25.5 (−3.6)	36.8 (2.7)	49.7 (9.8)	64.1 (17.8)	73.3 (22.9)	77.0 (25.0)	75.0 (23.9)	67.3 (19.6)	53.2 (11.8)	37.9 (3.3)	26.3 (−3.2)	50.6 (10.3)
Daily mean °F (°C)	10.7 (−11.8)	12.8 (−10.7)	23.1 (−4.9)	36.9 (2.7)	50.6 (10.3)	60.1 (15.6)	63.7 (17.6)	61.5 (16.4)	54.0 (12.2)	41.8 (5.4)	29.2 (−1.6)	17.4 (−8.1)	38.5 (3.6)
Mean daily minimum °F (°C)	0.3 (−17.6)	0.1 (−17.7)	9.4 (−12.6)	24.1 (−4.4)	37.2 (2.9)	46.8 (8.2)	50.4 (10.2)	47.9 (8.8)	40.8 (4.9)	30.5 (−0.8)	20.5 (−6.4)	8.5 (−13.1)	26.4 (−3.1)
Record low °F (°C)	−43 (−42)	−47 (−44)	−33 (−36)	−12 (−24)	10 (−12)	23 (−5)	27 (−3)	26 (−3)	15 (−9)	2 (−17)	−17 (−27)	−41 (−41)	−47 (−44)
Average precipitation inches (mm)	1.09 (28)	0.96 (24)	1.49 (38)	2.55 (65)	3.17 (81)	4.00 (102)	4.15 (105)	3.10 (79)	3.48 (88)	3.32 (84)	1.76 (45)	1.46 (37)	30.53 (775)
Average snowfall inches (cm)	14.6 (37)	12.5 (32)	8.7 (22)	7.4 (19)	0.3 (0.76)	0.0 (0.0)	0.0 (0.0)	0.0 (0.0)	0.0 (0.0)	2.1 (5.3)	8.2 (21)	13.6 (35)	67.4 (171)
Average precipitation days (≥ 0.01 in)	9.9	7.4	8.2	10.6	12.0	12.1	12.4	11.1	13.1	13.2	10.9	10.6	131.5
Average snowy days (≥ 0.1 in)	9.5	6.8	5.8	2.7	0.3	0.0	0.0	0.0	0.0	1.2	5.6	8.2	40.1
Source: NOAA

=== Communities ===
- Stambaugh was a city adjacent to the township that merged into the city of Iron River effective July 1, 2000. The area of the former city of Stambaugh was incorporated from land within the township.
- Caspian is a city within the township, but is administratively autonomous.
- Gaastra is a city within the township, but is administratively autonomous.
- Elmwood, also known as Elmwood Siding, is an unincorporated community in the township at 46°13′20″N 88°54′35″W. In 1887, it was a depot on the Chicago and North Western Transportation Company named "Paint River", after the nearby stream. A post office named Paint River was established on November 15, 1887. The spelling of the post office name changed to "Paintriver" on February 8, 1895 and was closed on July 31, 1901. The railroad station had been renamed Elmwood by 1898.
