= Crystal Theatre (Crystal Falls, Michigan) =

Theater in Michigan, US

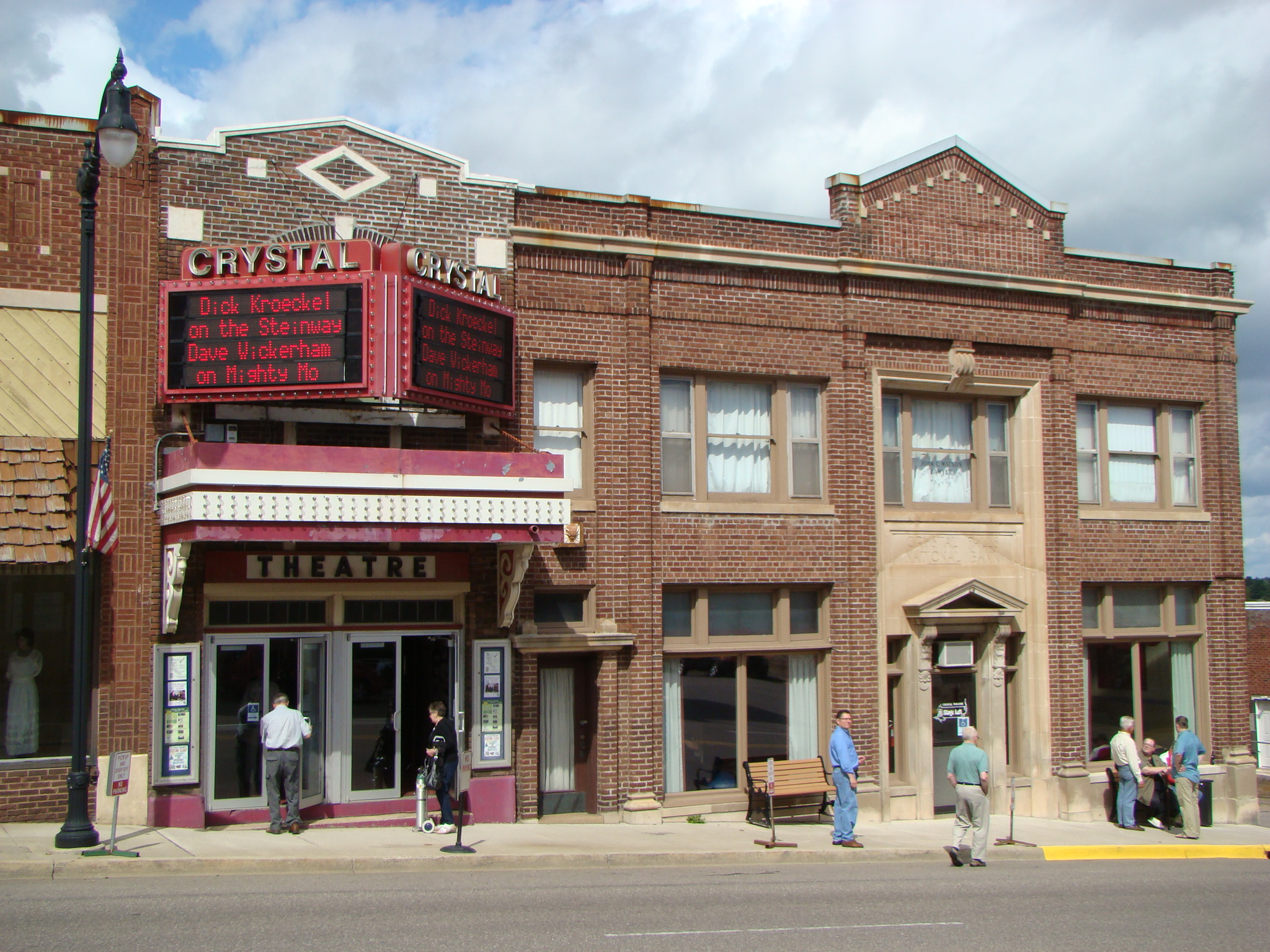
- The exterior and marquee of the Crystal Theatre
- Address: 304 Superior Avenue; Crystal Falls, Michigan; United States
- Type: Performing arts center

Construction
- Opened: 1927, as the Ejay Theatre
- Reopened: 1991, as the Crystal Theatre

Website
- thecrystaltheatre.org
- Michigan State Historic Site

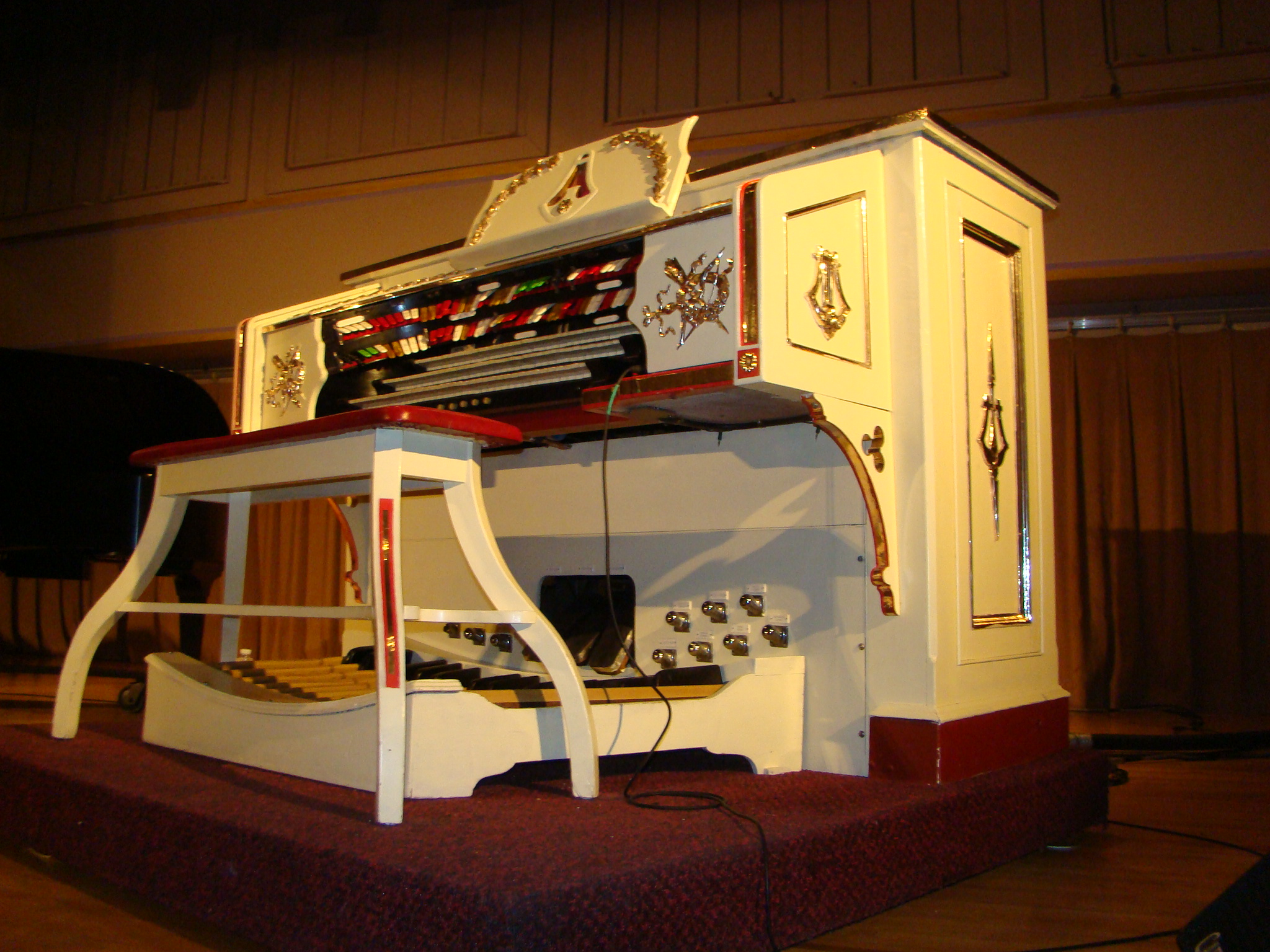
Moller theatre organ

The Crystal Theatre, also formerly known as the Aldo Theatre and EJAY Theatre, is a historic theater and performing arts center in Crystal Falls, Michigan. The theater hosts a wide variety of entertainment, with about two concerts per month during the summer months.

The theater was originally built as a vaudeville / movie theater in 1927. It was first called the EJAY, after its owner E.J. Bregger. Silent films were accompanied with live theater organ. The theater was on the vaudeville circuit, and traveling vaudeville acts made a stop at the EJAY on a regular basis.

After the vaudeville era ended, Bregger sold the theater to the Delft movie chain, which, in turn, sold it to Aldo Zaupa. The Aldo Theater showed movies through the 1970s until it closed in the early 1980s.

In 1989, a group of volunteers took on the challenge of restoring the theater to its original grandeur. The restored Crystal Theater opened its doors in the spring of 1991, with a Forest Park drama production of Our Town.

During the restoration of the theater, a vintage pipe organ was purchased and installed to replace the original theatre organ, which had been sold earlier. The current organ is the largest theatre pipe organ in Michigan's Upper Peninsula. The organ, consisting of three manuals and 21 ranks (sets of pipes), was originally built in 1927 by the M. P. Moller Company of Hagerstown, Maryland. There are more than 1,600 pipes, installed in the on-stage chambers, ranging in size from half an inch to over 16 feet in length. In addition, there is an assortment of actual tuned percussions, drums, and sound effects installed in two chambers, located on either side of the proscenium. The Möller organ was originally installed in the Illinois College of Music in Chicago where it was used to teach accompaniment and scoring for silent films. There is some additional pipe-work in the instrument that came from another, similar Möller theater organ from Brooklyn. In addition to the organ, there is a Steinway Model D grand piano.
