= Republic Island =

Island in Marquette County, Michigan, United States

Coordinates: 46°26′15.6″N 88°02′19.9″W

Republic Island is a privately owned island on the Michigamme River in the U.S. state of Michigan. It is two acre-wide. As of 2012, it was listed as one of the world's most expensive private islands available to rent.
