= Chicagon Lake =

Lake in the state of Michigan, United States

Chicaugon Lake
- Location within Michigan Location within the United States
- Location: Iron County, Michigan
- Coordinates: 46°03′37″N 88°30′09″W
- Type: Lake
- Primary outflows: Chicagon Creek
- Basin countries: United States
- Surface area: 1,100 acres (4.5 km^{2})
- Max. depth: 115 ft (35 m)
- Surface elevation: 1,430 ft (436 m)

Chicagon Lake is a small lake in Iron County, Michigan. It is part of the Paint River watershed. Pentoga Park is located along its southern edge.

== See also ==
- List of lakes in Michigan
