= Gibbs City, Michigan =

Coordinates: 46°13′33″N 88°42′02″W

Gibbs City is a ghost town in Michigan. It was founded as Atkinson in the late 19th century, centered on a sawmill on the Paint River. As the original village died, R. F. Gibbs built a new sawmill and the settlement grew to over 200 residents, having been renamed Gibbs City. In 1921 a fire burned down the mill and the town was mostly abandoned, although the post office stayed in operation until 1952. The location of Gibbs City is within the Ottawa National Forest.

In 1966 the remaining buildings were burned in a controlled fire.

== Sources ==
- Walter Romig, Michigan Place Names, p. 222.
- Ghosttowns.com, Kurt Wenner
