= Hagerman Lake (Michigan) =

Lake in Iron County, Michigan, United States

- Location within Michigan Location within the United States
- Location: Stambaugh Township, Iron County, Michigan
- Coordinates: 46.0599390°N 88.7789635°W
- Surface area: 584 acres (236 ha)
- Max. depth: 55 feet (17 m)
- Surface elevation: 1,565 feet (477 m)
- Islands: 6

Hagerman Lake is a 584-acre (236 ha) lake in Iron County, Michigan. The lake is largely developed with houses surrounded by dense forest. The bottom is mainly organic, and it has a maximum depth of 55 feet (17 m). The Hagerman Lake Recreation Area lies on the southern point of the lake. It has public access and a boat launch. On the lake is mainly homes as well as a Bible camp affiliated with the Evangelical Covenant Church. Hagerman Lake falls within the Ottawa National Forest. On the north end sits an 8-acre island owned by the Bible camp.

== See also ==
- List of lakes in Michigan
