= Ray Nitschke Memorial Bridge =

Ray Nitschke Memorial Bridge Main Street Bridge
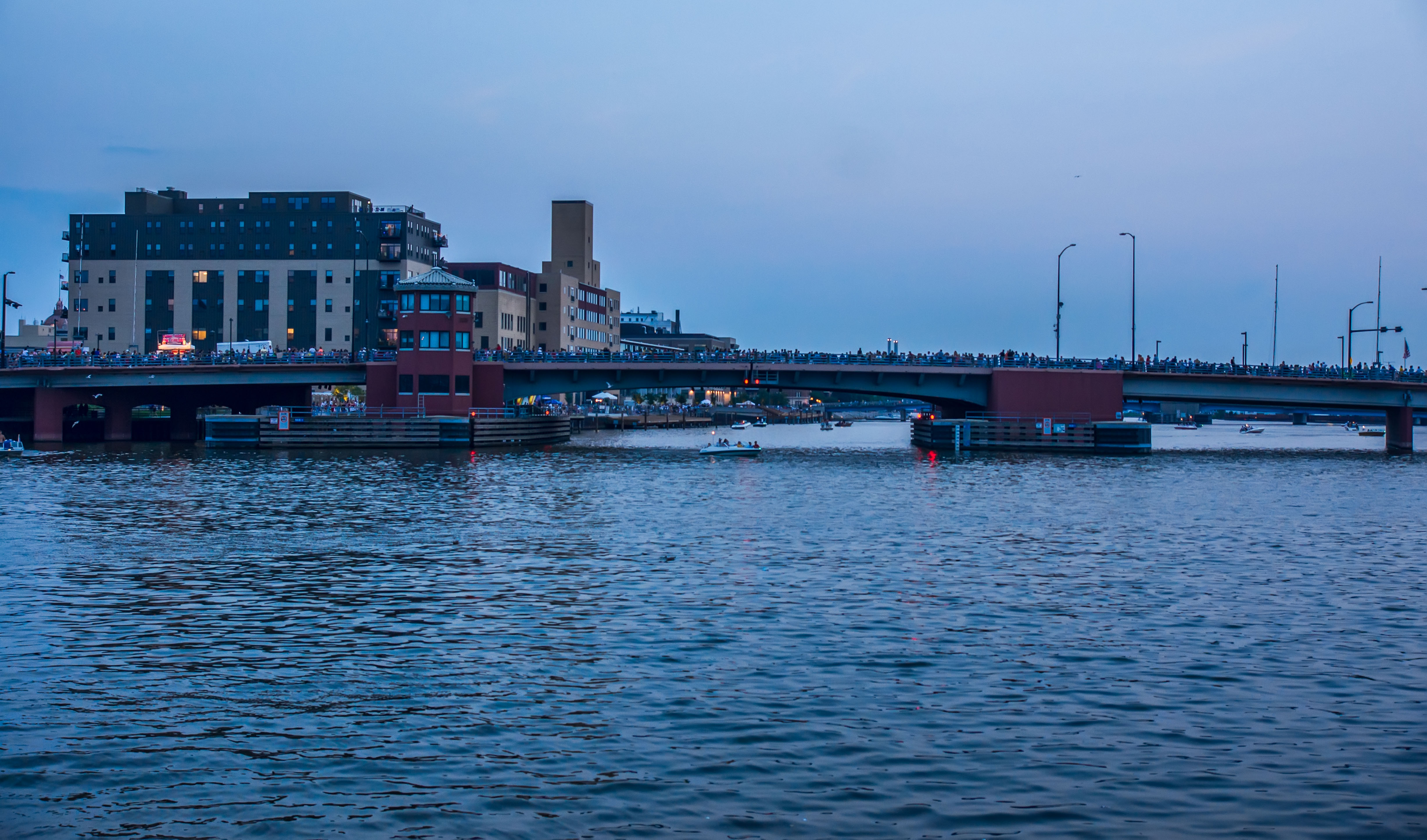
- Ray Nitschke Memorial Bridge covered with foot traffic
- Coordinates: 44.5183°N 88.0157°W
- Carries: US 141 (Main Street)
- Crosses: Fox River
- Owner: Wisconsin Department of Transportation and the City of Green Bay

Characteristics
- Design: Twin-leaf bascule bridge (Scherzer bascules)
- Total length: 773.7 ft (235.8 m)
- Width: 54.5 ft (16.6 m)
- Longest span: 170.6 ft (52.0 m)

History
- Designer: Parsons Brinckerhoff
- Opened: October 1998
- Replaces: old Main Street Bridge

Statistics
- Daily traffic: 12,860 daily avg.

The Ray Nitschke Memorial Bridge is a twin-leaf bascule bridge over the Fox River on Main Street (US 141) in Green Bay, Wisconsin. It is named in honor of the former Green Bay Packer linebacker Ray Nitschke.

== History ==
The bridge was designed by Parsons Brinckerhoff in 1995. It was built in 1998 replacing the old Main Street Bridge that was built in 1923. In September 2012, the bridge was closed for repairs because of rust problems. The bridge was reopened in November 2012.
