= Hematite Township, Michigan =

- Civil township
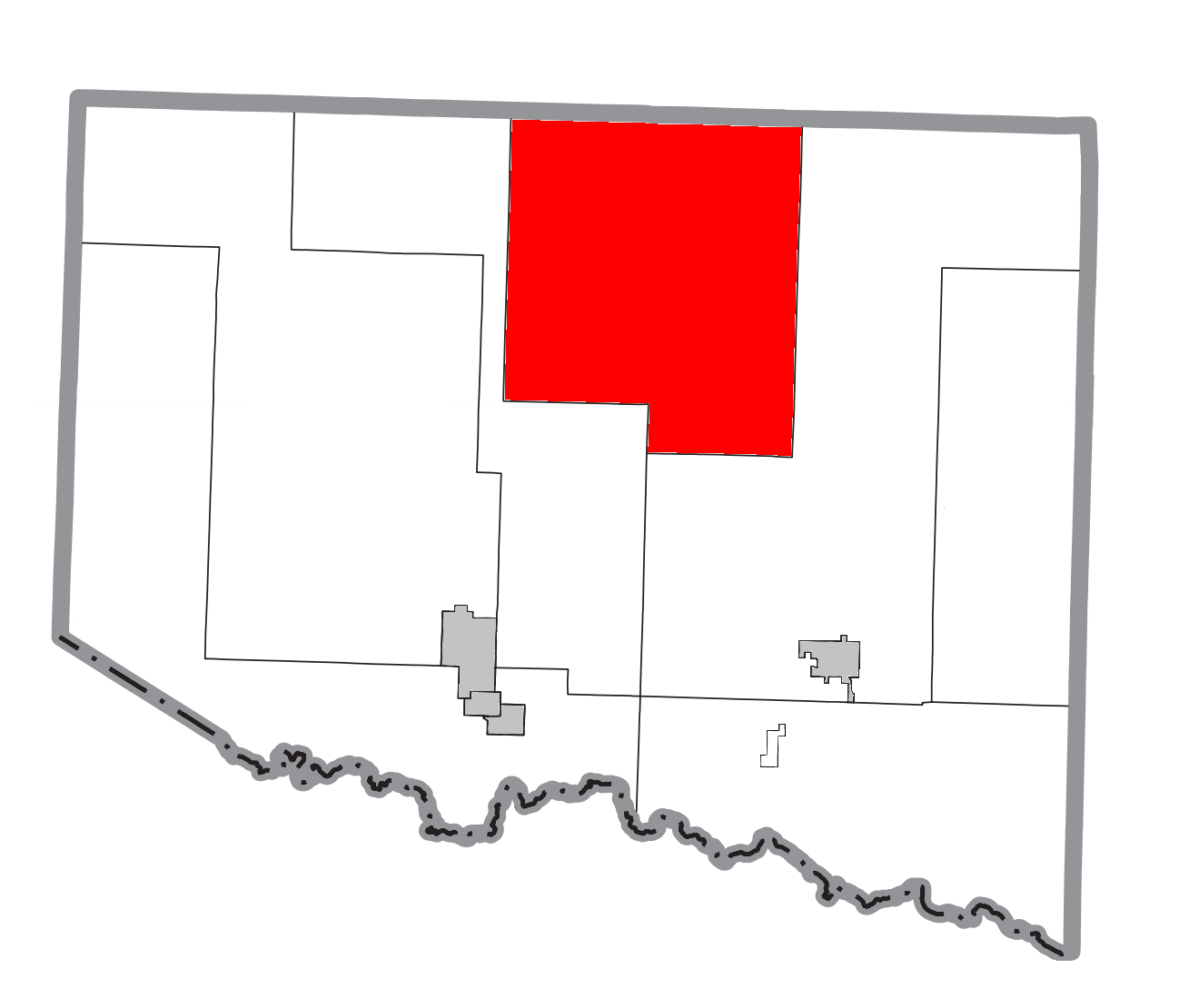
- Location within Iron County

- Location within the state of Michigan
- Coordinates: 46°18′39″N 88°30′21″W
- Country: United States
- State: Michigan
- County: Iron

Area
  - Total: 155.8 sq mi (403.4 km^{2})
  - Land: 153.4 sq mi (397.4 km^{2})
  - Water: 2.3 sq mi (6.0 km^{2})
- Elevation: 1,499 ft (457 m)

Population (2020)
  - Total: 269
  - Density: 2.3/sq mi (0.9/km^{2})
- Time zone: UTC-6 (Central (CST))
  - Summer (DST): UTC-5 (CDT)
- FIPS code: 26-37580
- GNIS feature ID: 1626462
- Website: https://hematitetownship.org/

Hematite Township is a civil township of Iron County in the U.S. state of Michigan. As of the 2000 census, the township population was 352, and by 2020 its population declined to 269. The township is named for the masses of hematite iron ore in the rocks prevalent in the area.

== Geography ==
According to the United States Census Bureau, the township has a total area of 155.8 square miles (404 km^{2}), of which 153.4 square miles (397 km^{2}) is land and 2.3 square miles (6.0 km^{2}) (1.48%) is water.

=== Communities ===
- Amasa is an unincorporated community within the township, situated on U.S. Highway 141 at 46°13′58″N 88°26′55″W where it crosses the Hemlock River. It was named for Amasa Stone of Cleveland, Ohio. The ZIP code is 49903.
