= Mansfield Township, Michigan =

- Civil township
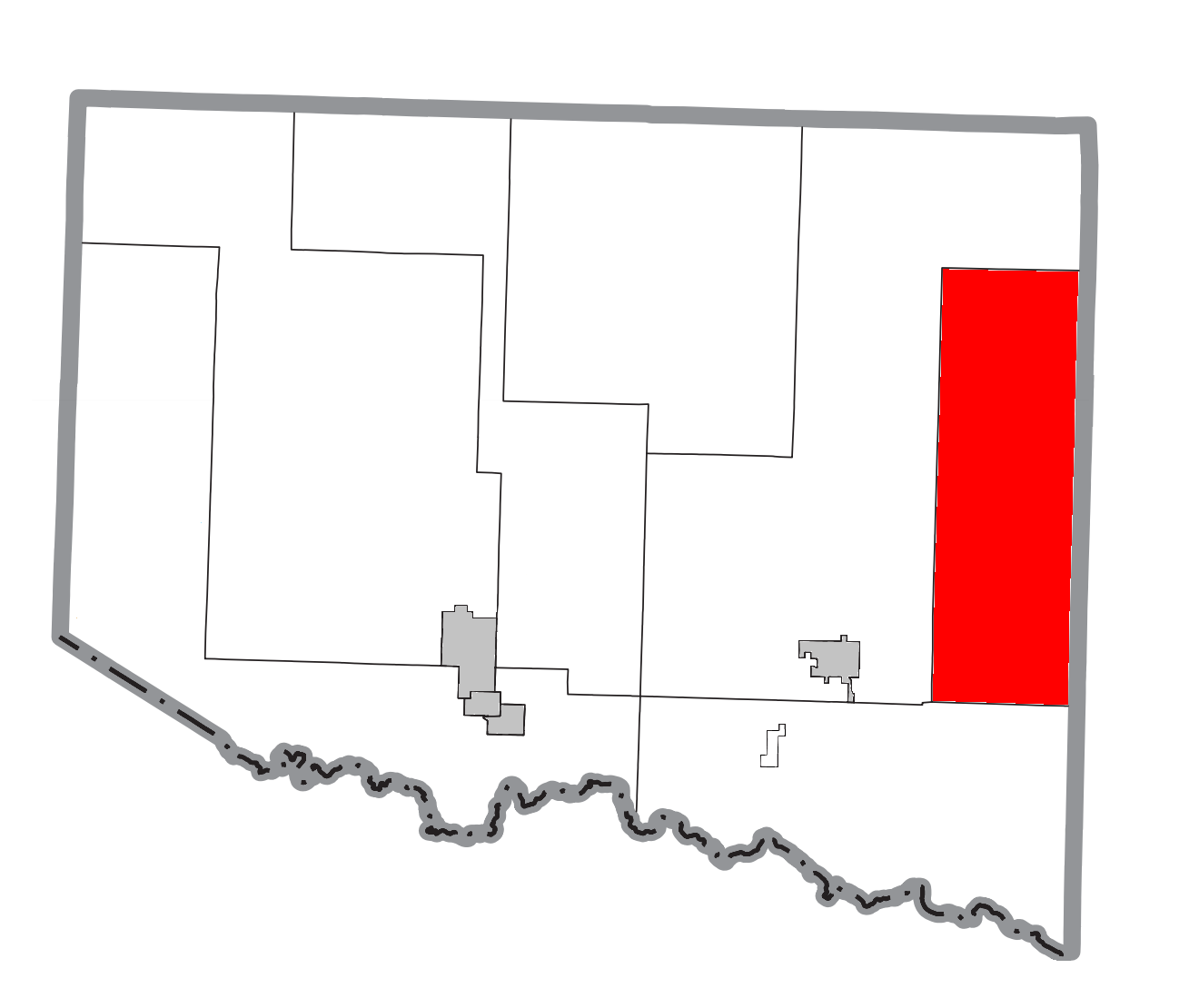
- Location within Iron County

- Location within the state of Michigan
- Coordinates: 46°11′13″N 88°11′25″W
- Country: United States
- State: Michigan
- County: Iron

Area
  - Total: 107.7 sq mi (278.9 km^{2})
  - Land: 99.3 sq mi (257.2 km^{2})
  - Water: 8.4 sq mi (21.7 km^{2})
- Elevation: 1,381 ft (421 m)

Population (2020)
  - Total: 236
  - Density: 2.3/sq mi (0.9/km^{2})
- Time zone: UTC-6 (Central (CST))
  - Summer (DST): UTC-5 (CDT)
- FIPS code: 26-50860
- GNIS feature ID: 1626671
- Website: https://mansfieldtownship.org/

Mansfield Township is a civil township of Iron County in the U.S. state of Michigan. The population was 243 at the 2000 census and 236 in 2020.

== Geography ==
According to the United States Census Bureau, the township has a total area of 107.7 square miles (279 km^{2}), of which 99.3 square miles (257 km^{2}) is land and 8.4 square miles (22 km^{2}) (7.78%) is water.

The Michigamme River flows through Mansfield Township.

=== Communities ===
- Colony Corners is an unincorporated community in the township
- Mansfield Location is an unincorporated community in the township
