= Crystal Falls Township, Michigan =

- Civil township
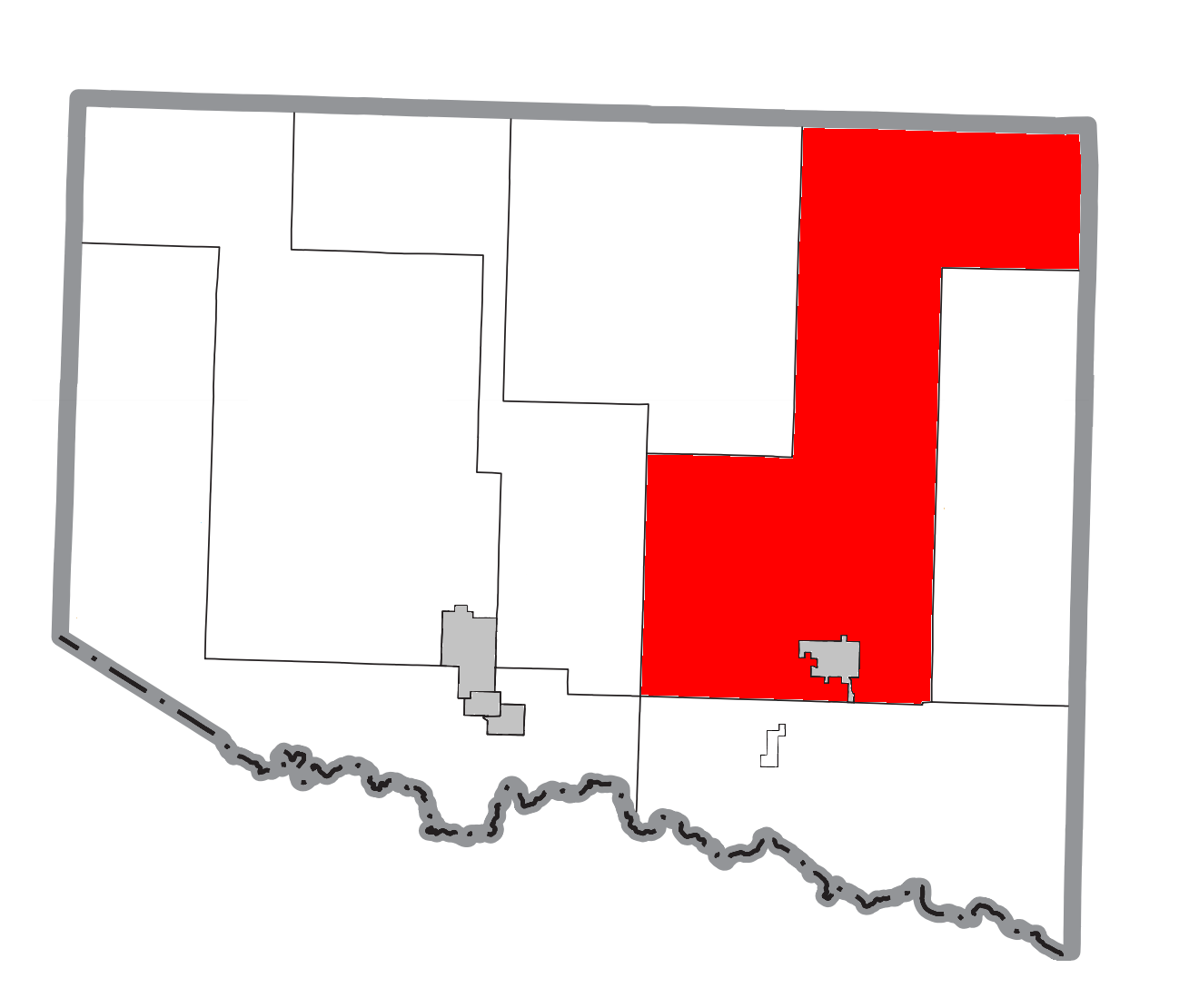
- Location within Iron County

- Location within the state of Michigan
- Coordinates: 46°12′1″N 88°20′18″W
- Country: United States
- State: Michigan
- County: Iron

Area
  - Total: 235.2 sq mi (609.1 km^{2})
  - Land: 228.7 sq mi (592.4 km^{2})
  - Water: 6.4 sq mi (16.7 km^{2})
- Elevation: 1,473 ft (449 m)

Population (2020)
  - Total: 1,647
  - Density: 7.5/sq mi (2.9/km^{2})
- Time zone: UTC-6 (Central (CST))
  - Summer (DST): UTC-5 (CDT)
- ZIP code: 49920
- Area code: 906
- FIPS code: 26-19150
- GNIS feature ID: 1626147
- Website: https://crystalfallstownship.org/

Crystal Falls Township is a civil township of Iron County in the Upper Peninsula of the U.S. state of Michigan. As of the 2000 census, the township population was 1,722. In 2020, its population declined to 1,647. The city of Crystal Falls is almost completely surrounded by the township, but it is administratively autonomous from the township.

== Geography ==
According to the United States Census Bureau, the township has a total area of 235.2 square miles (609 km^{2}), of which 228.7 square miles (592 km^{2}) is land and 6.4 square miles (17 km^{2}) (2.74%) is water.
