= Crystal Falls, Michigan =

- City
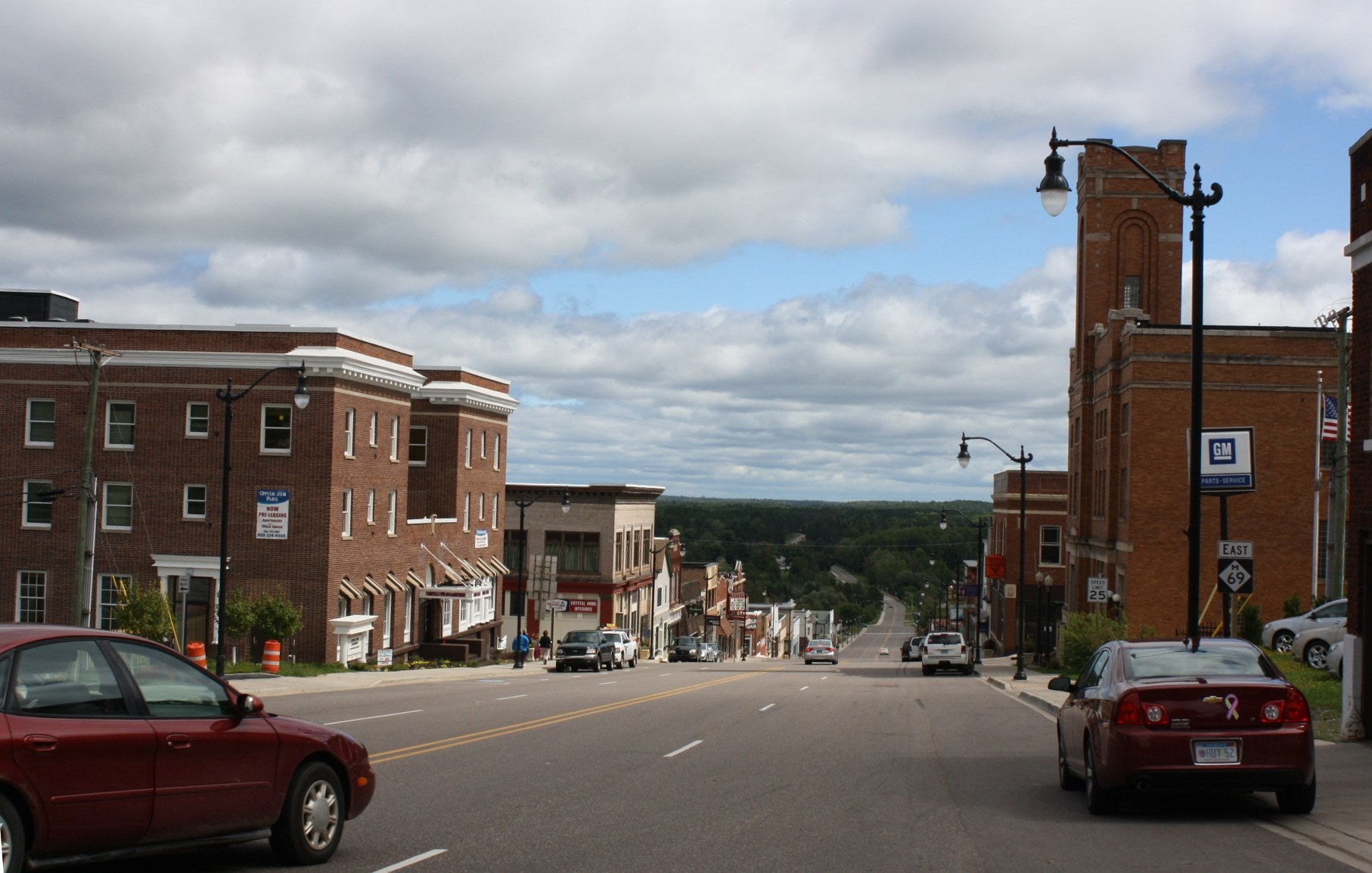
- Looking east at downtown Crystal Falls

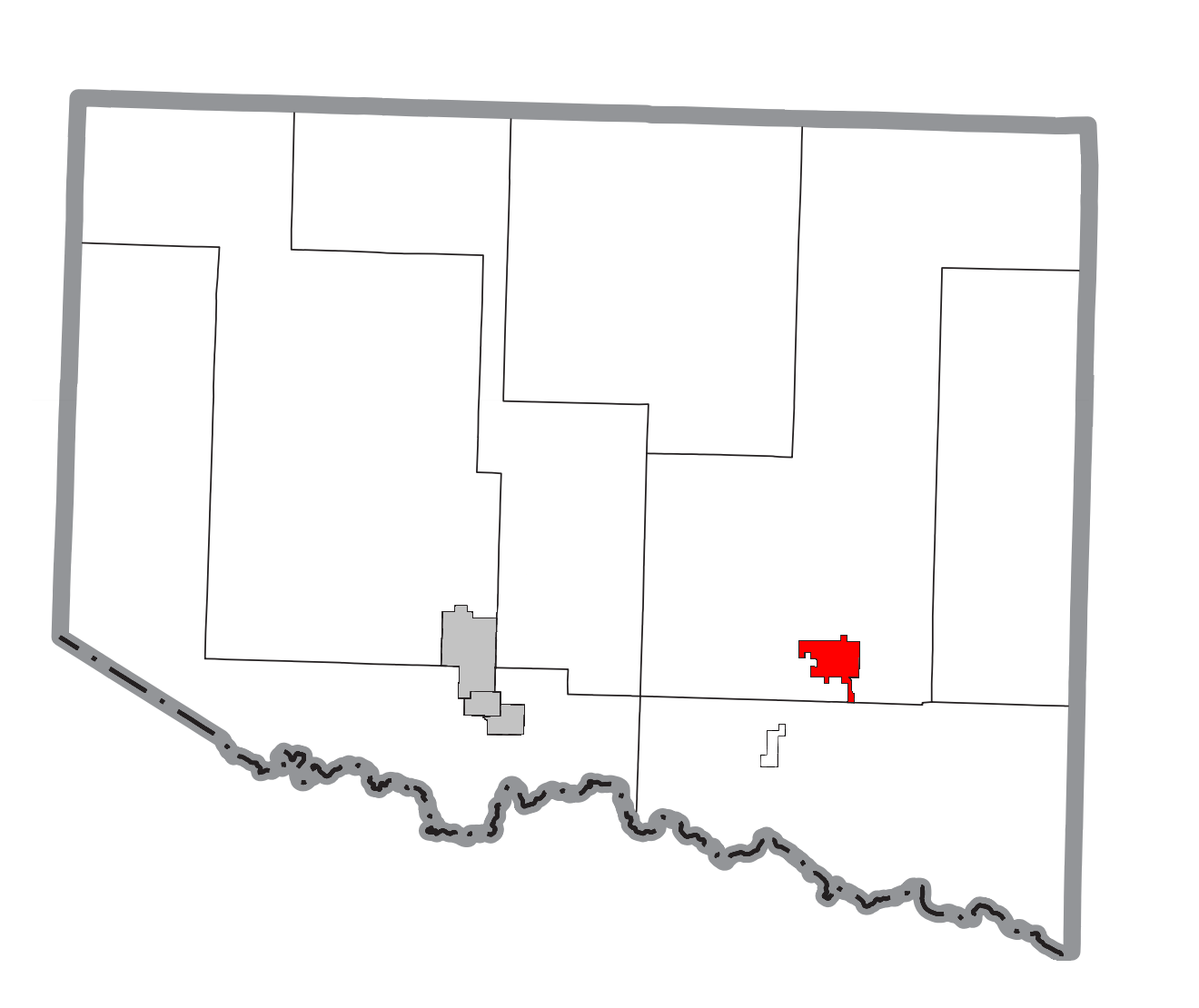
- Location within Iron County

- Location within the state of Michigan
- Coordinates: 46°5′50″N 88°19′56″W
- Country: United States
- State: Michigan
- County: Iron

Area
  - Total: 3.64 sq mi (9.42 km^{2})
  - Land: 3.49 sq mi (9.05 km^{2})
  - Water: 0.15 sq mi (0.38 km^{2})
- Elevation: 1,480 ft (450 m)

Population (2020)
  - Total: 1,598
  - Density: 457.5/sq mi (176.66/km^{2})
- Time zone: UTC-6 (Central (CST))
  - Summer (DST): UTC-5 (CDT)
- ZIP code: 49920
- Area code: 906
- FIPS code: 26-19140
- GNIS feature ID: 0624170
- Website: https://crystalfalls.org/

Crystal Falls is a city in and the county seat of Iron County, Michigan, United States. As of the 2020 census, the city population was 1,598. The city is located within Crystal Falls Township, but is a separate municipal entity. The area first developed as a major center for iron mining and the timber industry; it has become increasingly popular for tourism in recent years.

== History ==
Crystal Falls was platted in 1881. It was named for a nearby icy waterfall on the Paint River. A post office called Crystal Falls has been in operation since 1885.

== Geography ==
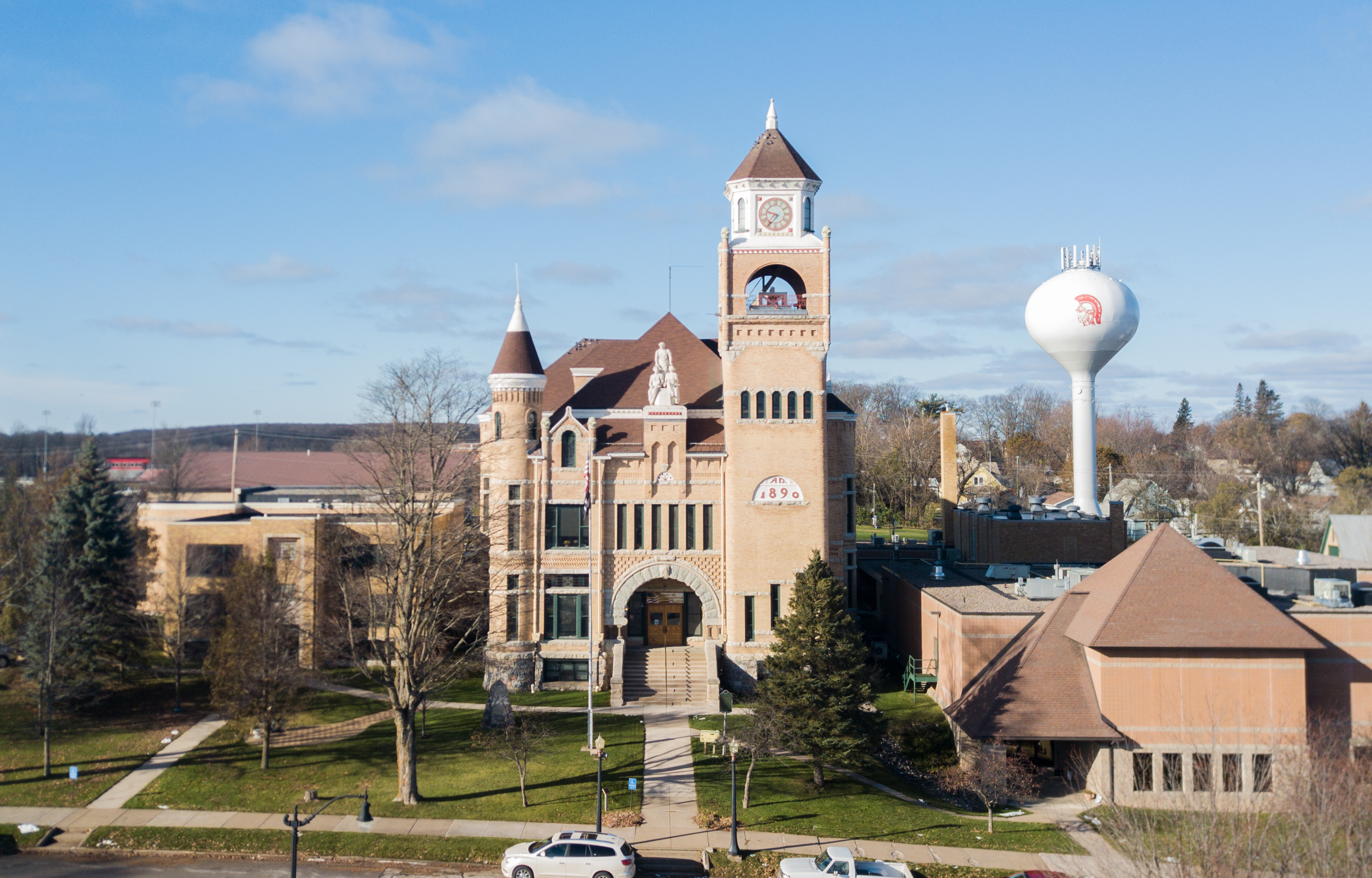
Iron County Courthouse

According to the United States Census Bureau, the city has a total area of 3.61 square miles (9.35 km^{2}), of which 3.47 square miles (8.99 km^{2}) is land and 0.14 square miles (0.36 km^{2}) is water. The city is very hilly and the castle-like county courthouse (built in 1890) sits on the highest point, overlooking the downtown business district.

=== Climate ===
Michigan State University's study of Crystal Falls weather concluded that precipitation was well distributed throughout the year with the crop season, April–September, receiving an average of 20.30 inches (516 mm) or 68% of the average annual total for the 1962-80 period. During this same period the average wettest month was June with 3.96 inches (101 mm), while the average driest month was February with 1.02 inches (26 mm). The National Weather Service's 1971–2000 data shows a 30-year normal annual precipitation of 29.65 inches (753 mm).

The following precipitation extremes, based on the time period of this station's published record, are: greatest observation-day total, 3.86 inches, recorded June 14, 1981; greatest monthly total, 12.48 inches, recorded June 1981; and least monthly total, 0.00 inches, recorded on several occasions.

Summer precipitation comes mainly in the form of afternoon showers and thundershowers. Annually, thunderstorms will occur on an average of 33 days. There are normally 139.2 days with measurable precipitation.

The 1950-51 through 1979-80 average seasonal snowfall was 70.6 inches (1.79 m). During this period, 143 days per season averaged 1-inch (25 mm) or more of snow on the ground, but varied greatly from season to season.

The following snowfall extremes, based on the time period of this station's published record, are: greatest observation-day total, 18.0 inches, recorded March 7, 1926; greatest monthly total, 53.4 inches, recorded March 1939; greatest seasonal total, 143.2 inches, recorded during 1942–43; least seasonal total, 31.6 inches, recorded during 1963-64 and 1 earlier season; and greatest snow depth, 47 inches, recorded March 15, 1926.

Although there are no longer official temperature observations in Crystal Falls, Michigan State University concluded that temperatures are similar to those at the National Weather Service office in Marquette, Michigan. Temperature records kept from 1962 to 1989 by the National Climatic Data Center show a record high of 99 degrees on June 30, 1963, and July 20, 1977. The record low was -42 degrees on February 17, 1979. Annually, there were an average of 4.4 days with highs of 90 degrees or higher; 96.9 days with highs of 32 degrees or lower; 207.1 days with lows of 32 degrees or lower; and 55.1 days with lows of 0 degrees or lower. Freezing temperatures were recorded in every month except July, which had a record low of 33 degrees on July 6, 1965.

Climate data for Crystal Falls, Michigan
Month	Jan	Feb	Mar	Apr	May	Jun	Jul	Aug	Sep	Oct	Nov	Dec	Year
Mean daily maximum °F (°C)	20.8 (−6.2)	26.3 (−3.2)	36.5 (2.5)	50.5 (10.3)	65.8 (18.8)	74.0 (23.3)	78.6 (25.9)	75.9 (24.4)	66.2 (19.0)	53.7 (12.1)	37.4 (3.0)	25.1 (−3.8)	50.9 (10.5)
Mean daily minimum °F (°C)	−2.1 (−18.9)	1.0 (−17.2)	12.2 (−11.0)	26.0 (−3.3)	37.6 (3.1)	47.0 (8.3)	51.7 (10.9)	50.3 (10.2)	41.9 (5.5)	32.3 (0.2)	20.9 (−6.2)	6.4 (−14.2)	27.1 (−2.7)
Average precipitation inches (mm)	1.24 (31)	0.82 (21)	1.79 (45)	2.17 (55)	2.92 (74)	3.86 (98)	3.57 (91)	3.59 (91)	3.66 (93)	2.67 (68)	2.01 (51)	1.35 (34)	29.65 (753)
Source: "Climatography of the United States," National Climatic Data Center (www.ncdc.noaa.gov)

== Demographics ==
Historical population
Census	Pop.	Note	%±
1900	3,231		—
1910	3,775		16.8%
1920	3,394		−10.1%
1930	2,995		−11.8%
1940	2,641		−11.8%
1950	2,316		−12.3%
1960	2,203		−4.9%
1970	2,000		−9.2%
1980	1,965		−1.7%
1990	1,922		−2.2%
2000	1,791		−6.8%
2010	1,469		−18.0%
2020	1,598		8.8%
U.S. Decennial Census

=== 2020 census ===
As of the 2020 census, Crystal Falls had a population of 1,598. The median age was 45.3 years. 20.3% of residents were under the age of 18 and 22.8% of residents were 65 years of age or older. For every 100 females there were 103.0 males, and for every 100 females age 18 and over there were 102.9 males age 18 and over.

0.0% of residents lived in urban areas, while 100.0% lived in rural areas.

There were 759 households in Crystal Falls, of which 22.1% had children under the age of 18 living in them. Of all households, 36.1% were married-couple households, 29.1% were households with a male householder and no spouse or partner present, and 28.3% were households with a female householder and no spouse or partner present. About 41.9% of all households were made up of individuals and 19.2% had someone living alone who was 65 years of age or older.

There were 920 housing units, of which 17.5% were vacant. The homeowner vacancy rate was 1.6% and the rental vacancy rate was 3.1%.

Racial composition as of the 2020 census
Race	Number	Percent
White	1,515	94.8%
Black or African American	0	0.0%
American Indian and Alaska Native	5	0.3%
Asian	6	0.4%
Native Hawaiian and Other Pacific Islander	0	0.0%
Some other race	12	0.8%
Two or more races	60	3.8%
Hispanic or Latino (of any race)	30	1.9%

=== 2010 census ===
At the 2010 census there were 1,469 people in 700 households, including 402 families, in the city. The population density was 423.3 inhabitants per square mile (163.4/km^{2}). There were 893 housing units at an average density of 257.3 per square mile (99.3/km^{2}). The racial makup of the city was 96.9% White, 0.2% African American, 0.7% Native American, 0.2% Asian, 0.1% from other races, and 1.8% from two or more races. Hispanic or Latino residents of any race were 1.0%.

Of the 700 households 22.3% had children under the age of 18 living with them, 41.9% were married couples living together, 11.0% had a female householder with no husband present, 4.6% had a male householder with no wife present, and 42.6% were non-families. 39.6% of households were one person and 20.2% were one person aged 65 or older. The average household size was 2.06 and the average family size was 2.73.

The median age was 48.3 years. 19.7% of residents were under the age of 18; 6.4% were between the ages of 18 and 24; 19.3% were from 25 to 44; 32.1% were from 45 to 64; and 22.5% were 65 or older. The gender makeup of the city was 49.4% male and 50.6% female.

=== 2000 census ===
At the 2000 census there were 1,791 people in 795 households, including 470 families, in the city. The population density was 530.6 inhabitants per square mile (204.9/km^{2}). There were 913 housing units at an average density of 270.5 per square mile (104.4/km^{2}). The racial makup of the city was 98.05% White, 0.06% African American, 0.61% Native American, 0.11% Asian, 0.39% from other races, and 0.78% from two or more races. Hispanic or Latino of any race were 1.23%. 17.1% were of Finnish, 15.5% Italian, 11.5% German, 9.4% Polish, 9.4% Swedish, 6.6% English and 5.3% French ancestry according to Census 2000. 97.5% spoke English, 1.1% Finnish and 1.1% Spanish as their first language.

Of the 795 households 24.8% had children under the age of 18 living with them, 46.0% were married couples living together, 9.4% had a female householder with no husband present, and 40.8% were non-families. 36.9% of households were one person and 22.3% were one person aged 65 or older. The average household size was 2.13 and the average family size was 2.78.

The age distribution was 22.2% under the age of 18, 6.1% from 18 to 24, 21.7% from 25 to 44, 21.3% from 45 to 64, and 28.7% 65 or older. The median age was 45 years. For every 100 females, there were 90.1 males. For every 100 females age 18 and over, there were 82.8 males.

The median household income was $26,637 and the median family income was $35,000. Males had a median income of $28,266 versus $20,144 for females. The per capita income for the city was $14,538. About 7.5% of families and 10.4% of the population were below the poverty line, including 15.6% of those under age 18 and 6.8% of those age 65 or over.

== Arts and culture ==
Crystal Falls is home to the Crystal Theater, a regional performing arts center.

Crystal Falls used to have a high veteran population. After both World Wars, a lot of veterans settled in and around the area. Crystal Falls was the last town to still celebrate V-J Day until the early 2000s. They have two big festivals during the summer. A "bass" festival which is a weekend of fun activity and a marathon. Highlighted by the annual "WOPS" vs Sweeds softball game, the mushroom festival replaced the V-J Day celebrations and that has the Polack vs Finns softball game.

Head to the ice the last weekend in February on the Michigamme reservoir for the annual Fisheree tournament. A tradition that most locals look forward to all year.

In April 1992, Crystal Falls received international attention due to the discovery of a giant fungus, Armillaria bulbosa, in the nearby forest. The discovery was announced in articles in Nature and The New York Times. The fungus, known as the "humongous fungus", covered an area of more than 30 acres (120,000 m^{2}) and had a total mass estimated at 100 tons. At the time it was believed to be one of the oldest living organism on earth, as well as one of the largest.

Although the fungus is actually located in nearby Mastodon Township, Michigan, the city of Crystal Falls adopted it as a tourist attraction, and holds a "Humungous Fungus Fest" as an annual event.

== Education ==
The Forest Park School District is based in Crystal Falls.

== Transportation ==
- US 2
- US 141
- M-69
- Indian Trails provides daily intercity bus service between St. Ignace and Ironwood, Michigan.

== Gallery ==
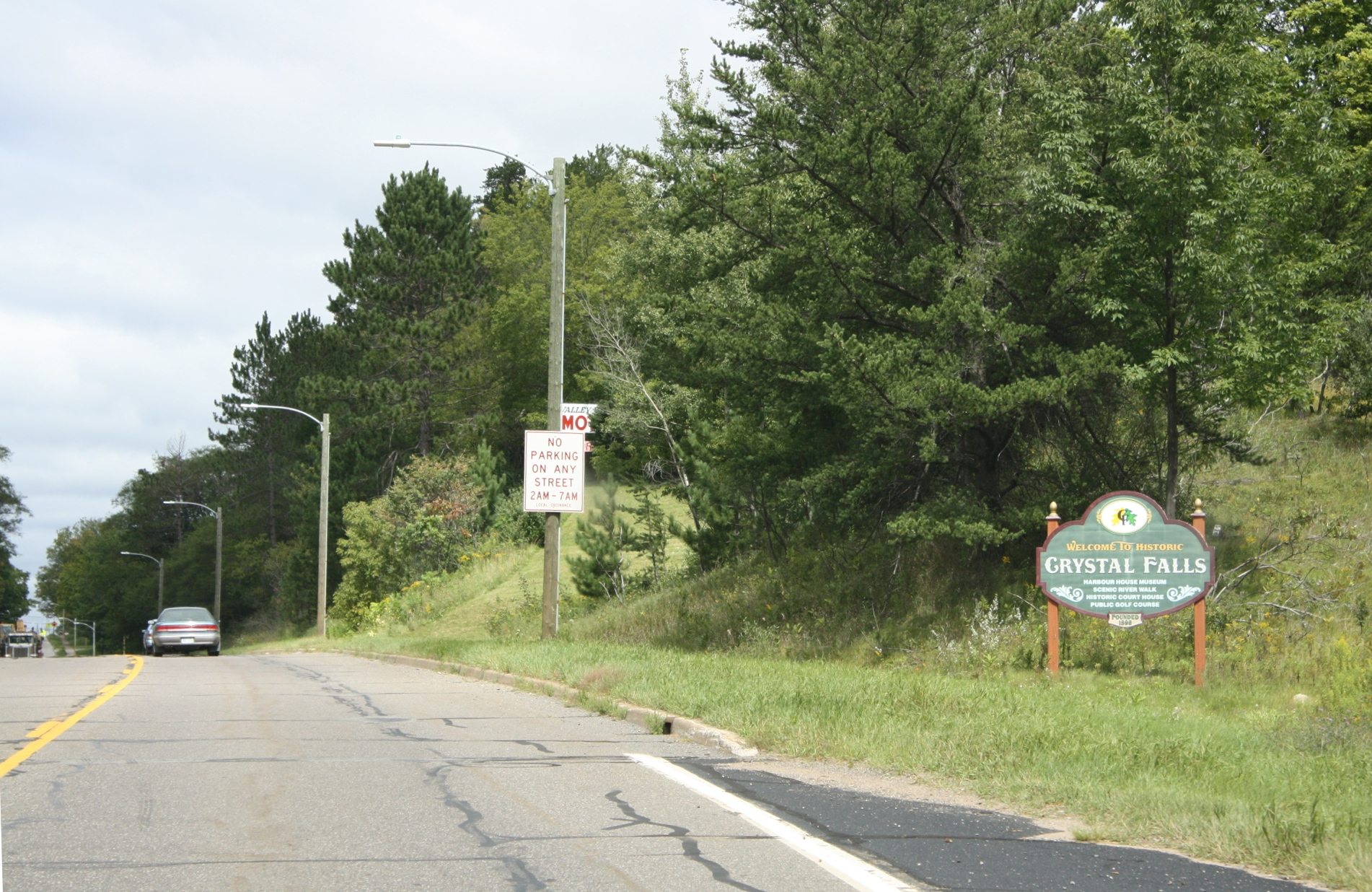
Welcome sign

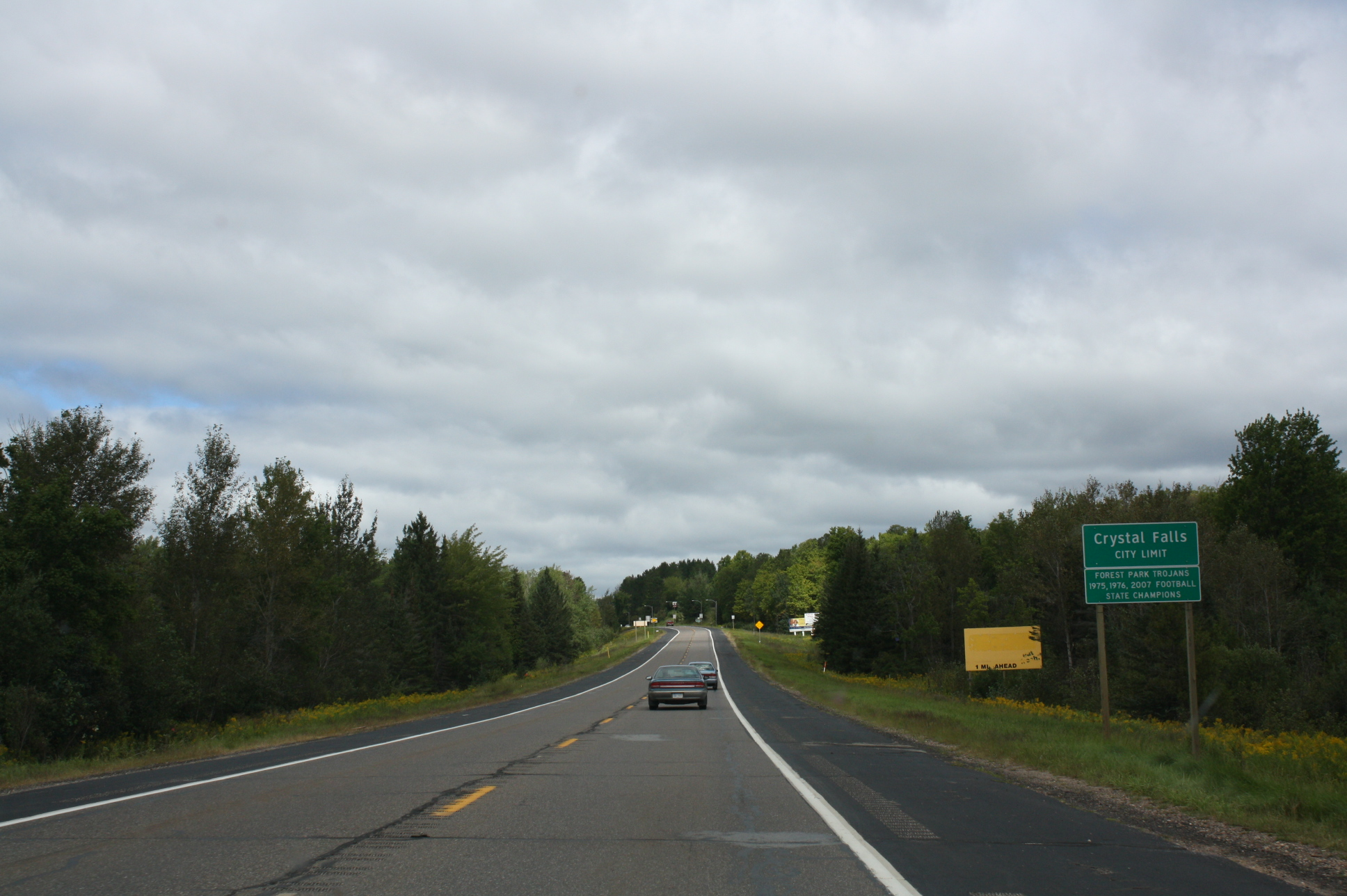
Sign

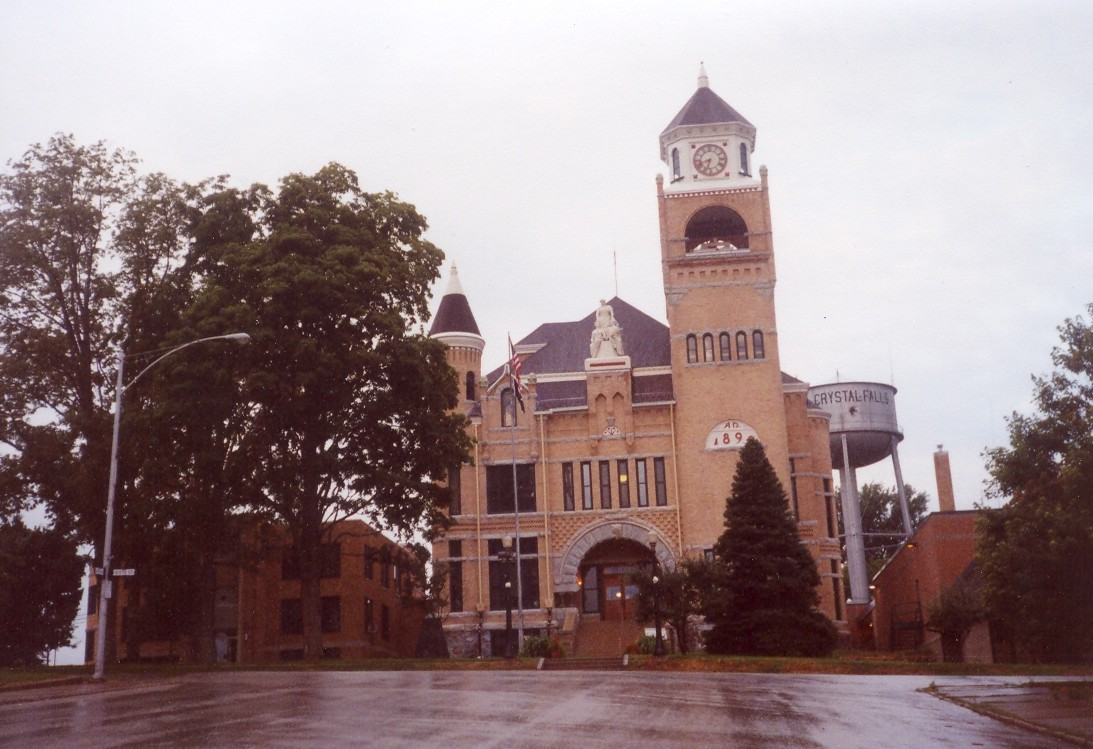
Iron County Courthouse
