= Paint River =

Coordinates: 45°57′50″N 88°14′42″W

Location
- Country: United States
- State: Michigan

National Wild and Scenic River
- Type: Recreational
- Designated: March 3, 1992

The Paint River is a 45.5-mile-long (73.2 km) river in the U.S. state of Michigan.

It is a tributary of the Brule River and flows through Gogebic and Iron counties. Via the Brule River, it is part of the Menominee River watershed, flowing to Lake Michigan.

The Paint River flows through Crystal Falls, Michigan, and empties into the Brule River before its confluence with the Michigamme River to form the Menominee.
