= Iron County, Michigan =

County in Michigan, United States

- County
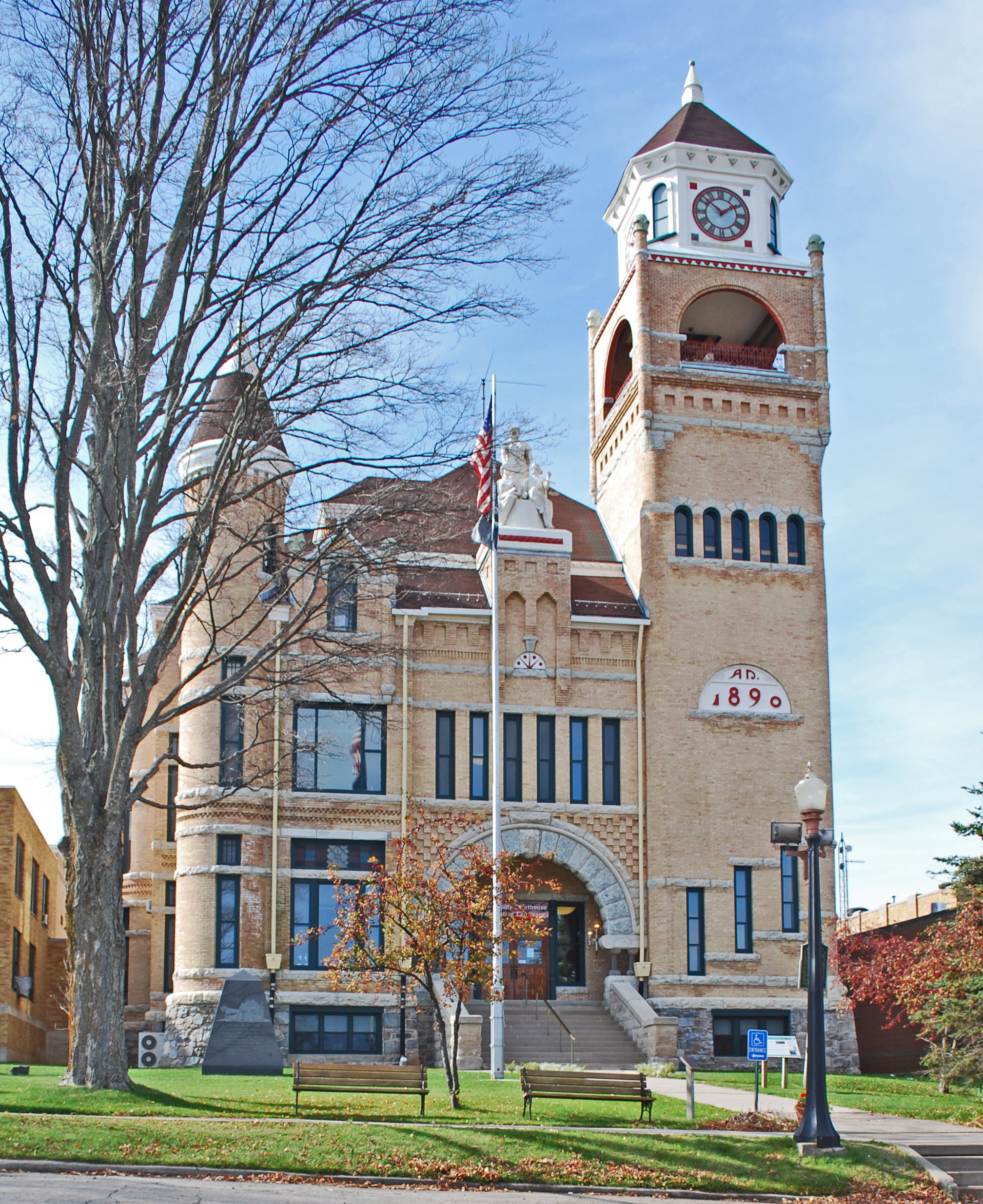
- Iron County Courthouse

- Location within the U.S. state of Michigan
- Coordinates: 46°13′N 88°31′W
- Country: United States
- State: Michigan
- Founded: April 3, 1885
- Named for: Iron ore
- Seat: Crystal Falls
- Largest city: Iron River

Area
  - Total: 1,211 sq mi (3,140 km^{2})
  - Land: 1,166 sq mi (3,020 km^{2})
  - Water: 45 sq mi (120 km^{2}) 3.7%

Population (2020)
  - Total: 11,631
  - Estimate (2025): 11,757 ▲
  - Density: 10/sq mi (3.9/km^{2})
- Time zone: UTC−6 (Central)
  - Summer (DST): UTC−5 (CDT)
- Congressional district: 1st
- Website: ironmi.com

Iron County is one of two landlocked counties in the Upper Peninsula of the U.S. state of Michigan. As of the 2020 census, the population was 11,631. The county seat is Crystal Falls.

== History ==
Iron County was organized in 1885, with territory partitioned from Marquette and Menominee counties. In 1890, the county's population was 4,432. It was named for the valuable iron ore found within its borders.

== Geography ==
According to the U.S. Census Bureau, the county has an area of 1,211 square miles (3,140 km^{2}), of which 1,166 square miles (3,020 km^{2}) is land and 45 square miles (120 km^{2}) (3.7%) is water. Along with its southeastern neighbor Dickinson County, it is one of only two landlocked counties in the Upper Peninsula.

=== Major highways ===
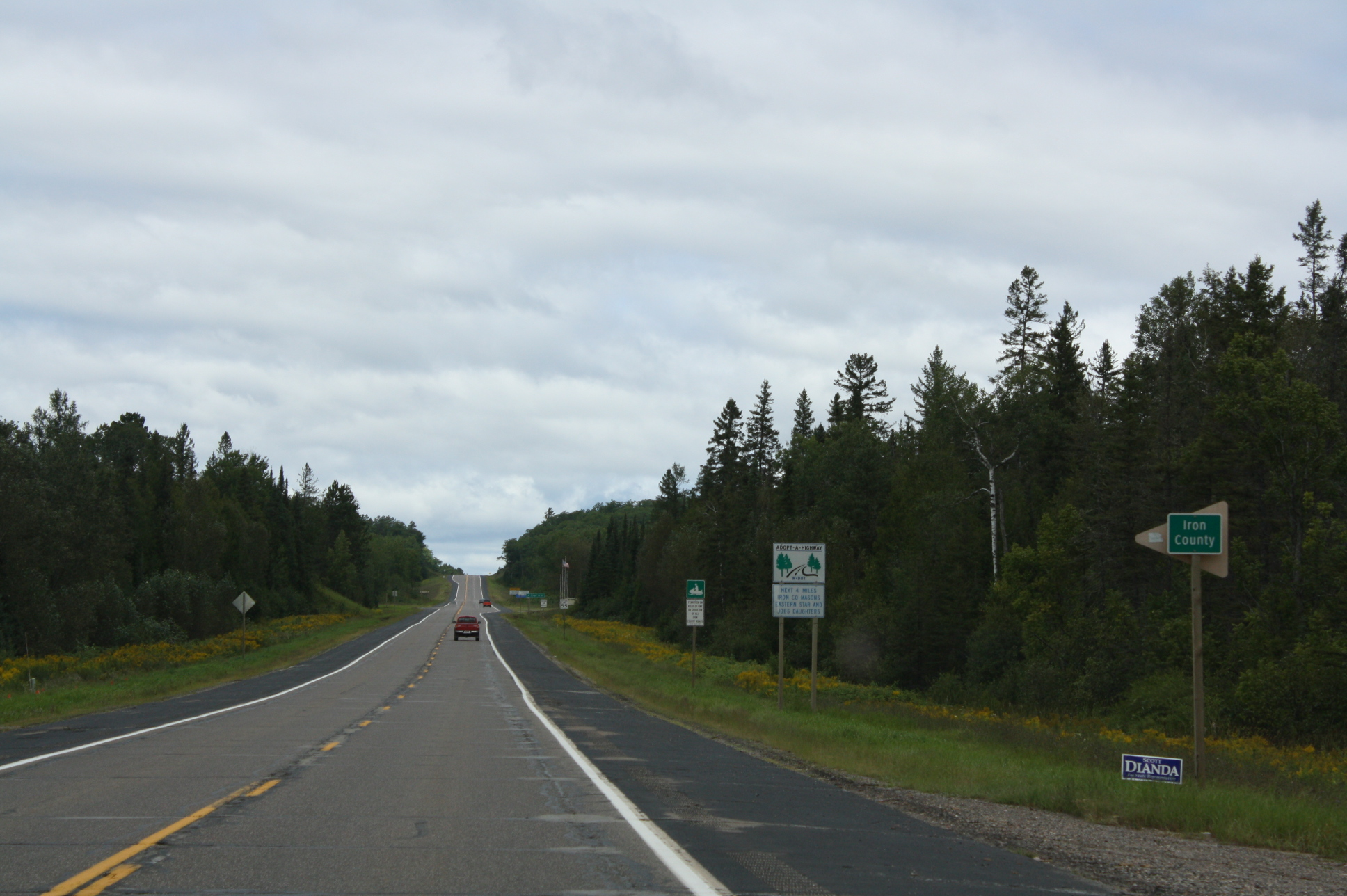
Entering Iron County on US 2 / US 141

- US 2 – runs east–west through lower part of county. Enters west line at 6 miles (9.7 km) above SW corner, then runs east and southeast to Crystal Falls, where it turns south and runs into Wisconsin. Passes Mineral Hills, Iron River, and Fortune Lake.
- US 141 – runs north–south through center of county. Enters north line of county from Covington in Baraga County, then runs south to intersection with US-2 at Crystal Falls.
- M-69 – runs east from Crystal Falls into Dickinson County.
- M-73 – enters south line of county from Nelma, Wisconsin, then runs northeast to intersection with US-2 at Iron River.
- M-189 – enters south line of county from Tipler, Wisconsin, then runs north to intersection with US-2 at Iron River.

=== Adjacent counties ===
- Houghton County (north)
- Baraga County (north)
- Marquette County (northeast)
- Dickinson County (east)
- Florence County, Wisconsin (southeast)
- Forest County, Wisconsin (south)
- Vilas County, Wisconsin (southwest)
- Gogebic County (west)
- Ontonagon County (northwest)

=== National protected area ===
- Ottawa National Forest (part)

== Communities ==
=== Cities ===
- Caspian
- Crystal Falls (county seat)
- Gaastra
- Iron River

=== Village ===
- Alpha

=== Census-designated place ===
- Amasa

=== Unincorporated communities ===
- Beechwood
- Colony Corners
- Elmwood
- Erickson Landing
- Forbes
- Fortune Lake
- Gibbs City – Ghost town on Paint River
- Mansfield Location
- Pentoga
- Rogers
- Stager

=== Townships ===
- Bates Township
- Crystal Falls Township
- Hematite Township
- Iron River Township
- Mansfield Township
- Mastodon Township
- Stambaugh Township

== Demographics ==
Historical population
Census	Pop.	Note	%±
1890	4,432		—
1900	8,990		102.8%
1910	15,164		68.7%
1920	22,107		45.8%
1930	20,805		−5.9%
1940	20,243		−2.7%
1950	17,692		−12.6%
1960	17,184		−2.9%
1970	13,813		−19.6%
1980	13,635		−1.3%
1990	13,175		−3.4%
2000	13,138		−0.3%
2010	11,817		−10.1%
2020	11,631		−1.6%
2025 (est.)	11,757	▲	1.1%
US Decennial Census; 1790-1960 1900-1990; 1990-2000 2010-2018

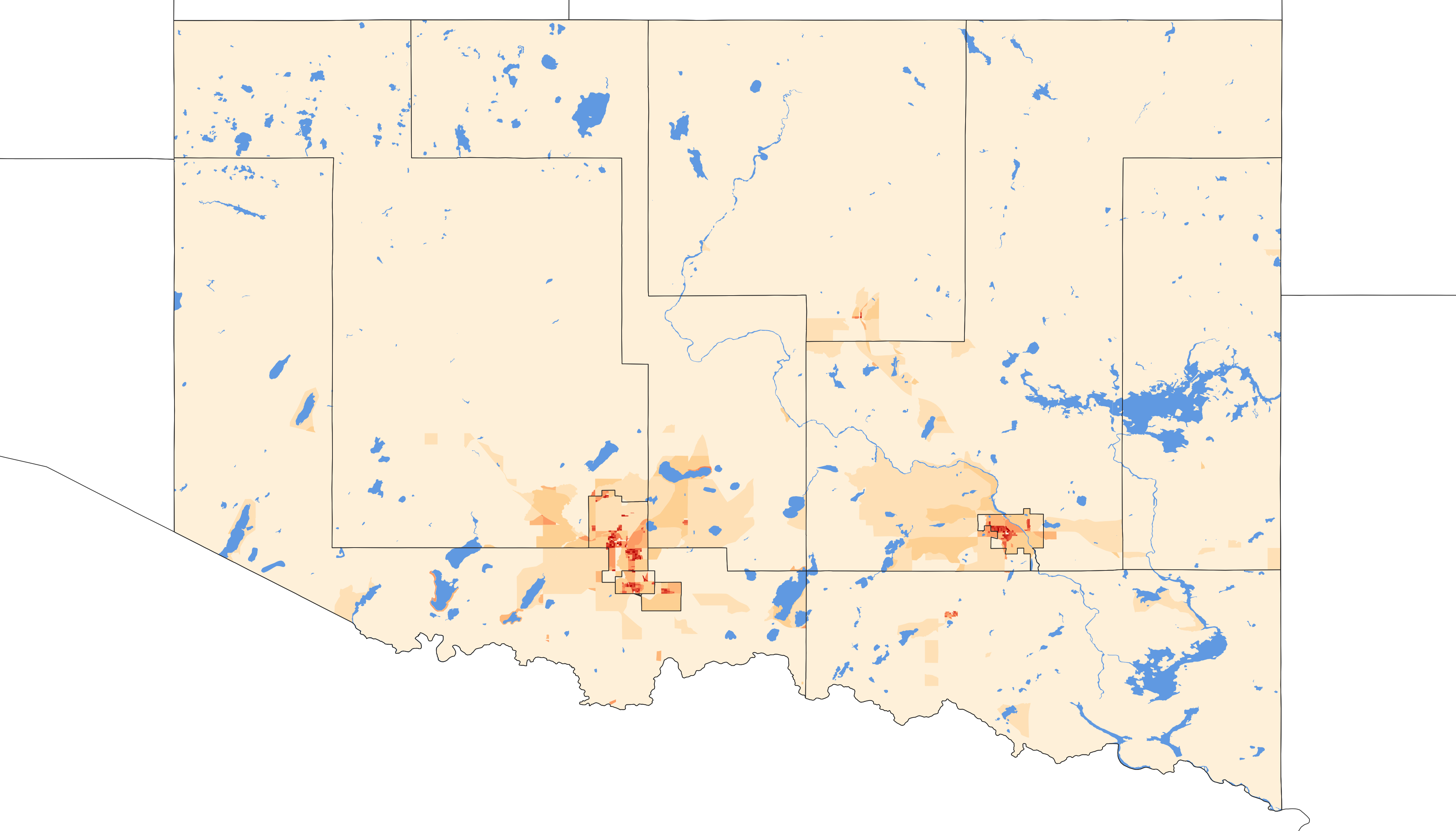
2020 population density of Iron County MI by census block

=== Racial and ethnic composition ===
Iron County, Michigan – Racial and ethnic composition Note: the US Census treats Hispanic/Latino as an ethnic category. This table excludes Latinos from the racial categories and assigns them to a separate category. Hispanics/Latinos may be of any race.
Race / Ethnicity (NH = Non-Hispanic)	Pop 1980	Pop 1990	Pop 2000	Pop 2010	Pop 2020	% 1980	% 1990	% 2000	% 2010	% 2020
White alone (NH)	13,516	12,974	12,601	11,370	10,823	99.13%	98.47%	95.91%	96.22%	93.05%
Black or African American alone (NH)	2	4	144	14	24	0.01%	0.03%	1.10%	0.12%	0.21%
Native American or Alaska Native alone (NH)	60	98	132	97	93	0.44%	0.74%	1.00%	0.82%	0.80%
Asian alone (NH)	26	29	26	32	41	0.19%	0.22%	0.20%	0.27%	0.35%
Native Hawaiian or Pacific Islander alone (NH)	x	x	0	2	0	x	x	0.00%	0.02%	0.00%
Other race alone (NH)	9	3	7	5	34	0.07%	0.02%	0.05%	0.04%	0.29%
Mixed race or Multiracial (NH)	x	x	144	136	410	x	x	1.10%	1.15%	3.53%
Hispanic or Latino (any race)	22	67	84	161	206	0.16%	0.51%	0.64%	1.36%	1.77%
Total	13,635	13,175	13,138	11,817	11,631	100.00%	100.00%	100.00%	100.00%	100.00%

=== 2020 census ===
As of the 2020 census, the county had a population of 11,631, a median age of 53.6 years, and 17.4% of residents under the age of 18 while 29.7% of residents were 65 years of age or older.

For every 100 females there were 101.1 males, and for every 100 females age 18 and over there were 103.7 males age 18 and over.

The racial makeup of the county was 94.0% White, 0.2% Black or African American, 0.8% American Indian and Alaska Native, 0.4% Asian, <0.1% Native Hawaiian and Pacific Islander, 0.5% from some other race, and 4.2% from two or more races. Hispanic or Latino residents of any race comprised 1.8% of the population.

<0.1% of residents lived in urban areas, while 100.0% lived in rural areas.

There were 5,521 households in the county, of which 18.7% had children under the age of 18 living in them. Of all households, 43.2% were married-couple households, 25.6% were households with a male householder and no spouse or partner present, and 24.2% were households with a female householder and no spouse or partner present. About 37.5% of all households were made up of individuals and 19.9% had someone living alone who was 65 years of age or older.

There were 8,878 housing units, of which 37.8% were vacant. Among occupied housing units, 81.3% were owner-occupied and 18.7% were renter-occupied. The homeowner vacancy rate was 2.4% and the rental vacancy rate was 10.2%.

=== 2010 census ===
The 2010 United States census indicates Iron County had a population of 11,817, 5,577 households, and 3,284 families, for a population density of 10 people per square mile (3.9 people/km^{2}). There were 9,197 housing units at an average density of 8 per square mile (3.1/km^{2}). This decrease of 1,321 people from the 2000 United States census represents a 10.1% population decrease.

In 2010, 97.1% of the population were White, 2.9% Native American, 0.3% Asian, 0.1% Black or African American, 0.2% of some other race, and 1.4% of two or more races; 1.4% were Hispanic or Latino (of any race). Culturally, 14.3% were of German, 11.5% Finnish, 11.3% Italian, 8.6% French, French Canadian or Cajun, 8.0% Swedish, 6.5% English, 5.8% American and 5.4% Irish ancestry.

In 2010, there were 5,577 households, out of which 18.1% had children under the age of 18 living with them, 46.6% were married couples living together, 8.3% had a female householder with no husband present, and 41.1% were non-families. 36.8% of all households were made up of individuals, and 19.1% had someone living alone who was 65 years of age or older. The average household size was 2.06 and the average family size was 2.65.

The county population contained 17.1% under the age of 18, 5.4% from 18 to 24, 17.2% from 25 to 44, 34.1% from 45 to 64, and 26.3% who were 65 years of age or older. The median age was 51.9 years. 49.3% of the population was male, 50.7% was female.

In 2010, the median income for a household in the county was $35,390, and the median income for a family was $46,337. The per capita income for the county was $20,099. About 6.5% of families and 11.7% of the population were below the poverty line, including 18.0% of those under age 18 and 8.8% of those age 65 or over.

== Government ==
Iron County was reliably Republican during its first three decades. However, since 1936 its voters have selected the Democratic Party nominee in 16 (out of 23) of the national elections through 2024, though it has voted Republican in the four most recent elections and five of the last six.

United States presidential election results for Iron County, Michigan
Year	Republican		Democratic		Third party(ies)	
Year	No.	%	No.	%	No.	%
1888	598	53.39%	520	46.43%	2	0.18%
1892	918	59.26%	587	37.90%	44	2.84%
1896	1,048	79.70%	236	17.95%	31	2.36%
1900	1,561	84.88%	257	13.97%	21	1.14%
1904	1,620	90.50%	139	7.77%	31	1.73%
1908	2,055	85.63%	260	10.83%	85	3.54%
1912	1,031	45.24%	218	9.57%	1,030	45.20%
1916	2,139	67.54%	877	27.69%	151	4.77%
1920	3,515	82.80%	497	11.71%	233	5.49%
1924	2,802	65.06%	247	5.73%	1,258	29.21%
1928	4,103	63.96%	2,262	35.26%	50	0.78%
1932	4,347	53.56%	3,416	42.09%	353	4.35%
1936	3,834	41.99%	5,216	57.13%	80	0.88%
1940	4,766	49.33%	4,808	49.77%	87	0.90%
1944	3,945	46.16%	4,537	53.09%	64	0.75%
1948	3,659	44.56%	4,125	50.23%	428	5.21%
1952	4,564	49.52%	4,597	49.88%	55	0.60%
1956	4,955	52.39%	4,490	47.47%	13	0.14%
1960	3,919	42.76%	5,232	57.09%	14	0.15%
1964	2,399	28.48%	6,011	71.36%	13	0.15%
1968	3,292	42.36%	4,130	53.14%	350	4.50%
1972	3,630	49.21%	3,512	47.61%	234	3.17%
1976	3,224	41.77%	4,401	57.02%	93	1.20%
1980	3,507	45.36%	3,742	48.40%	483	6.25%
1984	3,468	49.15%	3,559	50.44%	29	0.41%
1988	2,866	42.94%	3,774	56.55%	34	0.51%
1992	1,971	28.16%	3,648	52.11%	1,381	19.73%
1996	2,014	33.24%	3,232	53.34%	813	13.42%
2000	2,967	47.95%	3,014	48.71%	207	3.35%
2004	3,224	49.52%	3,215	49.38%	72	1.11%
2008	2,947	47.83%	3,080	49.98%	135	2.19%
2012	3,224	53.63%	2,687	44.69%	101	1.68%
2016	3,675	61.66%	2,004	33.62%	281	4.71%
2020	4,216	62.05%	2,493	36.69%	86	1.27%
2024	4,501	64.05%	2,441	34.74%	85	1.21%

United States Senate election results for Iron County, Michigan1
Year	Republican		Democratic		Third party(ies)	
Year	No.	%	No.	%	No.	%
2024	4,328	62.69%	2,404	34.82%	172	2.49%

Michigan Gubernatorial election results for Iron County
Year	Republican		Democratic		Third party(ies)	
Year	No.	%	No.	%	No.	%
2022	3,282	58.40%	2,236	39.79%	102	1.81%

Iron County operates the County jail, maintains rural roads, operates the major local courts, records deeds, mortgages, and vital records, administers public health regulations, and participates with the state in the provision of social services. The county board of commissioners controls the budget and has limited authority to make laws or ordinances. In Michigan, most local government functions – police and fire, building and zoning, tax assessment, street maintenance etc. – are the responsibility of individual cities and townships.

== Education ==
- West Iron County Schools
- Forest Park School District

== See also ==
- Iron County MRA
- List of Michigan State Historic Sites in Iron County
- National Register of Historic Places listings in Iron County, Michigan
- Alpha Michigan Brewing Company
