= List of churches in the Diocese of Marquette =

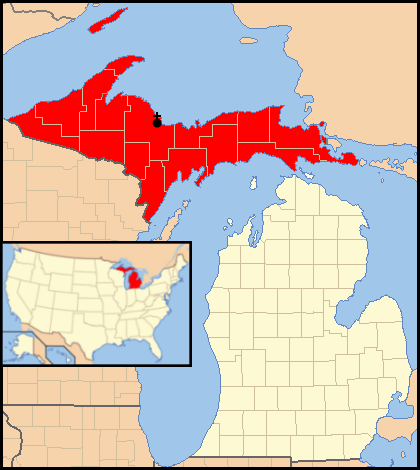
Diocese of Marquette marked in red

This is a list of current and former Roman Catholic churches in the Roman Catholic Diocese of Marquette. The diocese covers 16,377 square miles comprising the Upper Peninsula of Michigan and is divided into seven administrative vicariates as follows:

- St. Peter Cathedral Vicariate: Marquette County (named for St. Peter Cathedral, the diocesan cathedral church in Marquette);
- Holy Name of Mary Vicariate: Chippewa, Luce, and Mackinac Counties (named for the Holy Name of Mary Pro-Cathedral in Sault Ste. Marie);
- Most Holy Name of Jesus Vicariate: Baraga and Houghton Counties (including the cities of Hancock and Houghton);
- St. John Newman Vicariate: Menominee County (including the city of Menominee);
- St. Joseph and St. Patrick Vicariate: Delta and Schoolcraft Counties (named for the St. Joseph & St. Patrick church in Escanaba);
- St. Mary Norway Vicariate: Dickinson and Iron Counties (including the city of Ironwood); and
- St. Mary Rockland Vicariate: Gogebic and Ontonagon Counties at the western tip of the diocese.

== St. Peter Cathedral Vicariate ==
The St. Peter Cathedral Vicariate consists of Marquette County, Michigan, and includes the St. Peter Cathedral in Marquette and St. John the Evangelist Church in Ishpeming.

Name	Image	Location	Description/notes
St. Mary Mission		305 Bensinger, Big Bay	
Sacred Heart		1725 Main St, Champion	
St. Anthony		310 W. Iron St, Gwinn	
St. John the Evangelist		325 S. Pine St, Ishpeming	First church built 1869–1870; current church built 1927–1928
St. Joseph		1889 Prairie Ave, Ishpeming	
St. Pius X		North Lake	Former parish formed in the 1950s and closed in 1995
St. Therese Mission		E5420 Woodland Ave, AuTrain	
St. Christopher		2372 Badger St, Marquette	
St. Louis the King		264 Silver Creek Rd, Marquette	
St. Michael		401 West Kaye Ave, Marquette	
St. Peter Cathedral		311 W. Baraga Ave, Marquette	Cathedral church of the diocese; first built 1864-1866 and restored twice after fires; listed on the National Register of Historic Places in 2012
Sacred Heart		110 W. Jewell St, Munising	
St. Paul		202 W. Case St, Negaunee	
St. Joseph Mission		County Rd. 426, Northland	
Our Lady of Perpetual Help		201 Nicholas Ave, Palmer	
St. Augustine		574 Kloman Ave, Republic	
St. Rita		N1048 1st Ave. E, Trenary	

== Holy Name of Mary Vicariate ==
The Holy Name of Mary Vicariate consists of the three eastern counties of the Upper Peninsula: Chippewa, Luce, and Mackinac. It includes Sainte Anne on Mackinac Island and the Holy Name of Mary Pro-Cathedral in Sault Ste. Marie.

Name	Image	Location	Description/notes
Holy Family Mission		4585 E. 15 Mile Rd, Barbeau	
St. Kateri Tekakwitha Mission		12014 Lakeshore Dr, Bay Mills	
St. Francis Xavier		6769 South Bay St., M-221, Brimley	
St. Timothy Mission		N9153 Co. Rd. H-33, Curtis	
Sacred Heart		245 N. Ontario St, DeTour Village	
St. Florence Mission		34138 S. Townline Rd, Drummond Island	
St. Therese Mission		8137 M-77, Germfask	Merged with Divine Infant of Prague
St. Stanislaus Kostka		12841 E. Traynor Rd, Goetzville	
Holy Rosary		1000 Grand Marais Ave, Grand Marais	
Our Lady of the Snows Mission		261 Island View Rd, Hessel	
Sainte Anne		6837 Huron St, Mackinac Island	Parish dates to the 17th century; current church complex built starting in 1874
Immaculate Conception		W1934 Church St, Moran	
St. Stephen Mission		W11675 US Hwy 2, Naubinway	
St. Gregory		212 W Harrie St, Newberry	
Our Lady of Victory Mission		7208 N M123, Paradise	
St. Joseph		11497 W. Highway 40, Rudyard	
Church of Our Saviour (former church)		North Shore Rd., Sugar Island, near Sault Ste. Marie	Designated a Michigan State Historic Site in 1978 and listed on the National Register of Historic Places in 1982
Holy Name of Mary		377 Maple St, Sault Ste. Marie	Formerly the cathedral church of the Roman Catholic Diocese of Sault Ste. Marie; parish dates to 1668; current church built 1881; listed on the National Register of Historic Places in 1984
St. Isaac Jogues Mission		1529 Marquette Ave, Sault Ste. Marie	
St. Joseph		1101 Minneapolis St, Sault Ste. Marie	
St. Ignatius Loyola		120 Church St, St. Ignace	
Sacred Heart - Mission		3001 Westshore Rd, Sugar Island	
St. Mary Mission		Beech St, Trout Lake	

== Most Holy Name of Jesus Vicariate ==
The Most Holy Name of Jesus Vicariate consists of the Upper Peninsula counties of Baraga and Houghton.

Name	Image	Location	Description/notes
Most Holy Name of Jesus/St. Kateri Tekakwitha		14808 Assinins Rd, Assinins	
Our Lady of Peace		2854 US Highway 41, Ahmeek	
St. Ann		318 Lyons St, Baraga	
Sacred Heart		56512 Rockland St, Calumet	
St. Paul the Apostle		301 Eighth St, Calumet	
St. Anne		41903 Willson Memorial Drive, US 41, Chassell	
Our Lady of the Pines Mission		443 1st St, Copper Harbor	
St. Francis of Assisi Mission		23176 Fir Ave, Dollar Bay	
Holy Redeemer Mission		507 South St, Eagle Harbor	
Resurrection		900 Quincy, Hancock	
St. Albert the Great		411 MacInnes Dr, Houghton	
St. Ignatius Loyola		305 Portage, Houghton	Gothic church built 1898, listed on the National Register of Historic Places 1987
Sacred Heart of Jesus		16 6th St, L'Anse	
St. Joseph		701 Calumet St, Lake Linden	
Holy Family		107 Atlantic Ave, South Range	

== St. John Newman Vicariate ==
The St. John Newman Vicariate consists of the Upper Peninsula county of Menominee.

Name	Image	Location	Description/notes
Holy Redeemer		W-5541 Birch Creek Rd. No. 6, Menominee	
Holy Spirit		1016 10th Ave, Menominee	
Resurrection		2607 18th St, Menominee	
St. John the Baptist		904 11th Ave, Menominee	Built 1921-1922 and listed in 1995 on the National Register of Historic Places; now operated as Menominee Heritage Museum
St. Bruno		N13770 Old US Highway 41, Nadeau	
St. John Neumann		N16150 Maple St, Spalding	
Precious Blood		S 304 Bluff St, Stephenson	

== St. Joseph and St. Patrick Vicariate ==
The St. Joseph and St. Patrick Vicariate consists of the Upper Peninsula counties of Delta and Schoolcraft.

Name	Image	Location	Description/notes
St. Mary Magdalene		1130S County Rd 442, Cooks	
St. Anne		817 S Lincoln Rd, Escanaba	
St. Joseph & St. Patrick		709 1st Ave South, Escanaba	Parish of St. Joseph founded 1865 and St. Patrick in 1901; St. Patrick Church built 1903 and the current St. Patrick Church completed 1939; two parishes merged 1997
St. Thomas the Apostle		1820 9th Ave N, Escanaba	
St. Elizabeth Ann Seton		1216 12th Rd, Bark River	
St. Joseph		5803 State Hwy M35, Perkins	
St. Joseph Mission		W2332 Cemetery Rd, Foster City	
St. John the Baptist		6410 State St, Garden	
All Saints		715 Wisconsin Ave, Gladstone	
Holy Family		4011 County 416 - 20th Rd, Gladstone	
Divine Infant of Prague Mission		1985W US-2, Gulliver	
St. Francis De Sales		330 Oak St, Manistique	Founded as a mission in 1833; current Tudor-Gothic style structure was completed in 1954
St. Andrew		8236 River St, Nahma	
St. Lawrence		Nahma	
St. Charles Borromeo		7860 River St, Rapid River	
St. Anthony of Padua		6596 N 3rd St, Wells	

== St. Mary Norway Vicariate ==
The St. Mary Norway Vicariate consists of the Upper Peninsula counties of Dickinson and Iron.

Name	Image	Location	Description/notes
St. Cecilia		510 Brady Ave, Caspian	
St. Rose		703 Bell Ave, Channing	
Guardian Angels		412 Crystal Ave, Crystal Falls	
Immaculate Conception		500 E Blaine St, Iron Mountain	Built 1902, listed on the National Register of Historic Places in 1990
St. Mary & St. Joseph		411 West B St, Iron Mountain	
St. Agnes		702 N. Fourth Ave, Iron River	
American Martyrs		908 W. Sagola Ave, Kingsford	
St. Mary Queen of Peace		600 Marquette Blvd, Kingsford	
St. Mary		401 Main St, Norway	
St. Barbara		159 Mission St, Vulcan	

== St. Mary Rockland Vicariate ==
The St. Mary Rockland Vicariate consists of the Upper Peninsula's western counties of Gogebic and Ontonagon.

Name	Image	Location	Description/notes
St. Ann Mission		401 Elm St, Bergland	
St. Sebastian		210 E. Iron St, Bessemer	
Sacred Heart		201 S. Birch St, Ewen	
Our Lady of Peace		108 S. Marquette St, Ironwood	
St. Catherine Mission		406 Main St, Marenisco	
Holy Family		515 Pine St, Ontonagon	
St. Mary		11 Elm St, Rockland	
Immaculate Conception		407 Ascherman St, Wakefield	
Immaculate Conception		E23933 D Ave, Watersmeet	
St. Jude		8 Cedar St, White Pine	
