= Bark River =

Bark River may refer to the following places or geographical features in the United States:

Rivers

- Bark River (Michigan), a river in Michigan
- Bark River (Rock River), a river in Wisconsin, tributary of the Rock River
- Bark River (Lake Superior), a river in Wisconsin, tributary of Lake Superior

Other

- Bark River, Michigan, an unincorporated community
- Bark River Township, Michigan
- Bark River International Raceway, an off-road racing track near the Michigan community, host of the Traxxas TORC Series
