= Harris Township, Michigan =

- Civil township
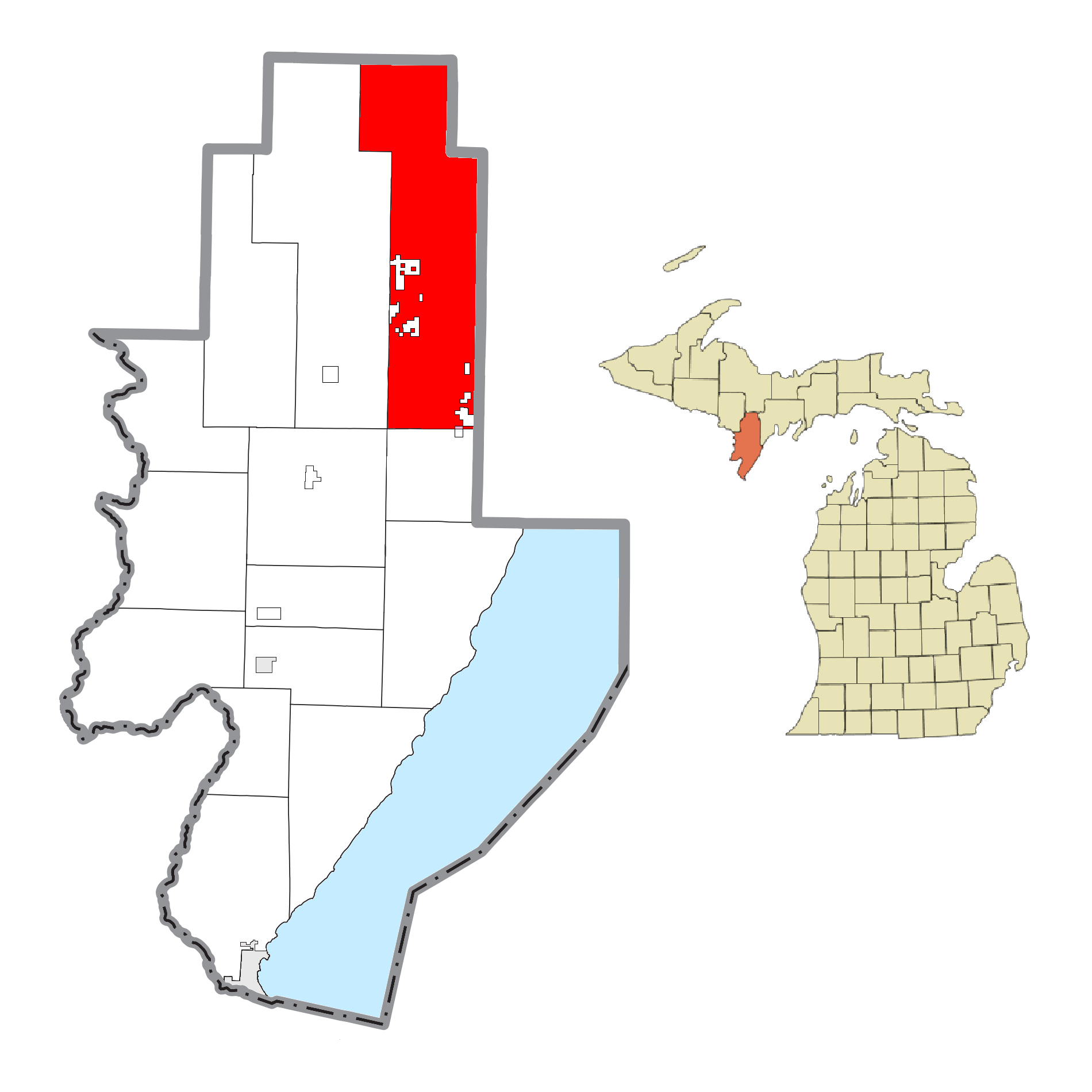
- Location within Menominee County and the state of Michigan

- Location within Michigan Location within the United States
- Coordinates: 45°44′54″N 87°23′32″W
- Country: United States
- State: Michigan
- County: Menominee

Government
  - Supervisor: Peter Kleiman

Area
  - Total: 143.3 sq mi (371 km^{2})
  - Land: 143.2 sq mi (371 km^{2})
  - Water: 0.1 sq mi (0.26 km^{2})
- Elevation: 850 ft (259 m)

Population (2020)
  - Total: 2,113
  - Density: 14.8/sq mi (5.7/km^{2})
- Time zone: UTC-6 (Central (CST))
  - Summer (DST): UTC-5 (CDT)
- ZIP Codes: 49845 (Harris); 49896 (Wilson); 49807 (Bark River); 49873 (Perronville)
- Area code: 906
- FIPS code: 26-109-36760
- GNIS feature ID: 1626437
- Website: harristownshipmi.gov

Harris Township is a civil township of Menominee County in the U.S. state of Michigan. The population was 2,113 at the 2020 census.

== Geography ==
Harris Township occupies the northeast part of Menominee County, extending 24 miles (39 km) from north to south. It is bordered to the east by Delta County and to the north by Marquette County. The city of Escanaba is 16 miles (26 km) to the east via US Routes 2 and 41, while the village of Powers is 6 miles (10 km) to the west. Menominee, the county seat, is 58 miles (93 km) to the south by road.

According to the U.S. Census Bureau, Harris Township has a total area of 143.3 square miles (371 km^{2}), of which 143.2 square miles (371 km^{2}) are land and 0.1 square miles (0.3 km^{2}), or 0.10%, are water. The Cedar River and its tributaries drain the southern third of the township, except for along the eastern border, where the Bark River has its source. The Ford River drains the northern part of the township, while its tributary Tenmile Creek drains the central part. The entire township drains to Lake Michigan.

Most of the Hannahville Indian Community is located within Harris Township.

== Communities ==
- Harris is an unincorporated community in the township on US 2 and US 41 at 45°42′13″N 87°20′43″W. A post office named "DeLoughary" was first established here on July 8, 1880, named for its first postmaster, George W. DeLoughary, a local farmer. The office was closed on May 4, 1883, after DeLoughary resigned. The office reopened on July 13, 1883, with postmaster Michael B. Harris, a lumberman who had settled here in 1875 and was later a state legislator. On September 6, 1900, the office was renamed for him. The Harris post office (ZIP Code 49845) serves the community.
- Perronville is an unincorporated community in the township on M-69 at 45°47′55″N 87°21′11″W. A railroad was built through here in 1873 to haul ore and timber. The settlement was named for Menasippe Perron, who built a dam and sawmill here in 1883, and became the first postmaster on September 11, 1897. The Perronville post office (ZIP Code 49873) covers the northern half of the township.
- Wilson is an unincorporated community in the western part of the township along US 2 and US 41 at 45°42′19″N 86°26′17″W. The Wilson post office (ZIP Code 49896) covers the southern third of Harris Township, excluding the community of Harris.

== Demographics ==
Historical population
| Census | Pop. | Note | %± |
|---|---|---|---|
| 1910 | 1,561 | | — |
| 1920 | 1,621 | | 3.8% |
| 1930 | 1,344 | | −17.1% |
| 1940 | 1,465 | | 9.0% |
| 1950 | 1,345 | | −8.2% |
| 1960 | 1,195 | | −11.2% |
| 1970 | 1,237 | | 3.5% |
| 1980 | 1,563 | | 26.4% |
| 1990 | 1,542 | | −1.3% |
| 2000 | 1,895 | | 22.9% |
| 2010 | 1,968 | | 3.9% |
| 2020 | 2,113 | | 7.4% |
U.S. Decennial Census

As of the census of 2000, there were 1,895 people, 656 households, and 516 families residing in the township. By 2020, there were 2,113 people in the township.

== Education ==
Most of the township is in the Bark River-Harris School District, while a portion is in the North Central Area Schools.

Hannahville Indian School, a Bureau of Indian Education-affiliated tribal school (which also functions as a charter school) is in the township.
