= Chaison =

Chaison may refer to:

- Chaison, Michigan, an unincorporated community
- Gary Chaison, an American university professor
