= Winde, Michigan =

- Unincorporated community
- Location within the state of Michigan
- Coordinates: 45°58′07″N 87°05′50″W
- Country: United States
- State: Michigan
- County: Delta
- Township: Baldwin
- Elevation: 797 ft (243 m)
- Time zone: UTC-5 (Eastern (EST))
  - Summer (DST): UTC-4 (EDT)
- ZIP code(s): 49837
- Area code: 906
- GNIS feature ID: 1622180

Winde is an unincorporated community in Delta County, in the U.S. state of Michigan. It is located west of Perkins in Baldwin Township.

== History ==
Winde contained a post office from 1918 until 1925. The community was named for Herman Winde, a pioneer settler.
