= Bark River-Harris Schools =

School district headquartered in Harris, Michigan, United States

Address
- P.O. Box 350 Harris, Menominee County, Michigan, 49845; United States

District information
- Grades: PreKindergarten–12
- Superintendent: Jeremy Pach
- Schools: 2
- Budget: $10,358,000 2022–2023 expenditures
- NCES District ID: 2604020

Students and staff
- Students: 721 (2024–2025)
- Teachers: 46.51 (on an FTE basis) (2024–2025)
- Staff: 85.08 FTE (2024–2025)
- Student–teacher ratio: 15.5 (2024–2025)
- District mascot: Broncos

Other information
- Website: www.brhschools.org

Bark River-Harris School District is a school district in the Upper Peninsula of Michigan, headquartered in Harris, Michigan. It includes sections of Delta County and Menominee County: Bark River Township in Delta County, and the majority of Harris Township in Menominee County.

It is served by the Delta-Schoolcraft Intermediate School District.

== History ==
Bark River-Harris School was dedicated on May 7, 1972.

In 2018 the Hannahville Indian Community gave the district $3.9 million so it could build an expansion, and voters passed a millage so the remainder of the funds for expansion could be obtained. In June 2019 the expansion and renovation project began. The total cost was $4 million. The expansion is to house the child development facility.

== Student body ==
Most students live in the settlements of Harris, Bark River, Schaffer, and Wilson.

Circa 1975 the average class size was 30 students. The Native American students reported discrimination and had a dropout rate of 85%, prompting the tribe to establish the Hannahville Indian School.

== Schools ==
Schools in Bark River-Harris Schools share a building at W471 US2 & 41 in Harris.

Schools in Bark River-Harris Schools district
School	Notes
Bark River-Harris High School	Grades 9–12.
Bark River-Harris Elementary	Grades PreK-6
