= Saint John the Evangelist Catholic Church =

Saint John the Evangelist's Catholic Church may refer to:

- Church of St John the Evangelist, Liège, Belgium
- San Giovanni Evangelista, Ravenna, Italy
- St. John the Evangelist Catholic Church (Ishpeming, Michigan), U.S.
- St. John the Evangelist Catholic Church (Frederick, Maryland), U.S.
- St. John the Evangelist Catholic Church (Silver Spring, Maryland), U.S.
- St. John the Evangelist Catholic Church (Philadelphia, Pennsylvania), U.S.

== See also ==
- St. John the Baptist Church (disambiguation)
- St. John's Cathedral (disambiguation)
- St. John's Church (disambiguation)
