= Baldwin Township, Delta County, Michigan =

Baldwin Township, Michigan
- Civil township
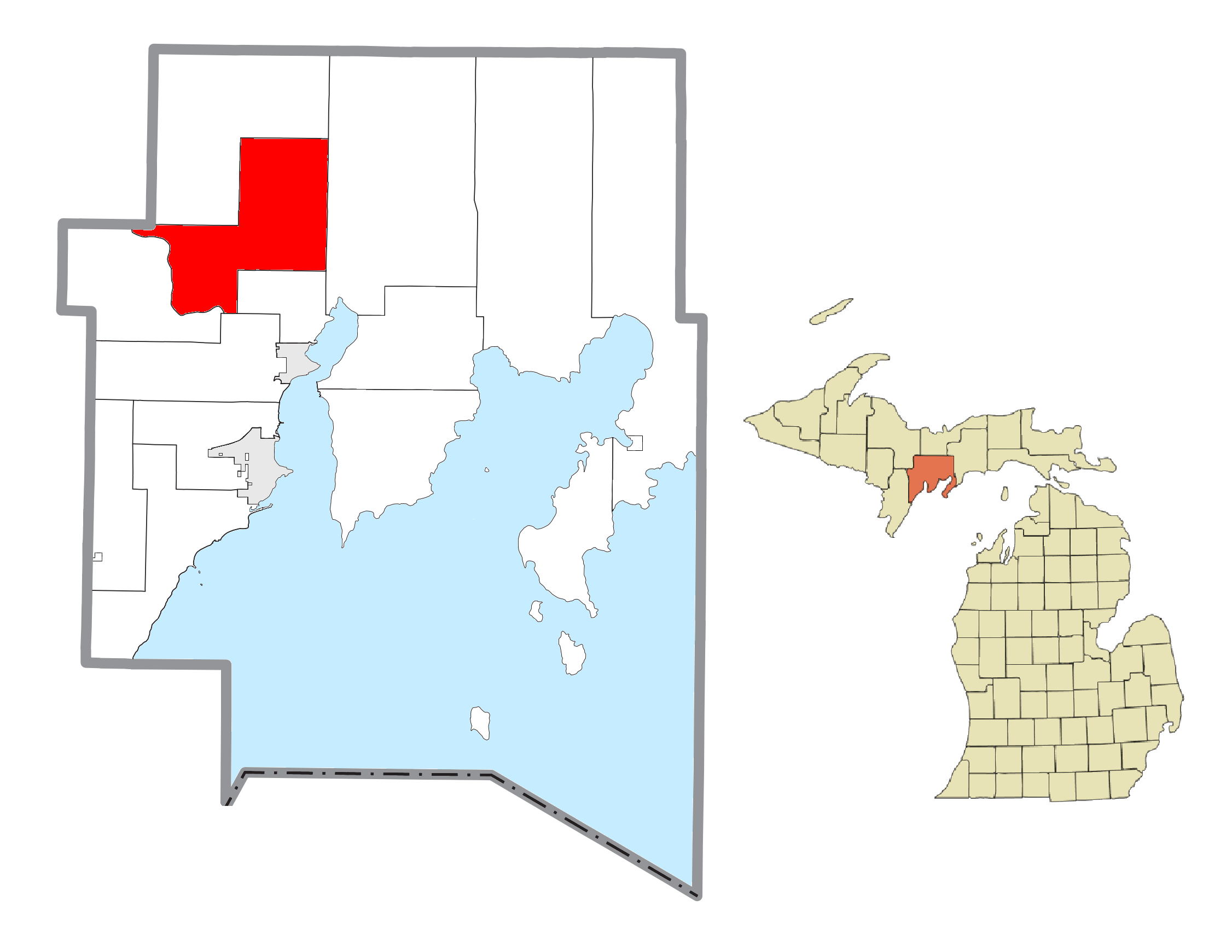
- Location within Delta County

- Location within the state of Michigan Baldwin Township (the United States)
- Coordinates: 45°58′45″N 87°06′10″W
- Country: United States
- State: Michigan
- County: Delta

Government
  - Supervisor: Gregory J. Stevenson

Area
  - Total: 84.2 sq mi (218.1 km^{2})
  - Land: 83.8 sq mi (217.0 km^{2})
  - Water: 0.42 sq mi (1.1 km^{2})
- Elevation: 804 ft (245 m)

Population (2020)
  - Total: 700
  - Density: 8.4/sq mi (3.2/km^{2})
- Time zone: UTC-5 (Eastern (EST))
  - Summer (DST): UTC-4 (EDT)
- ZIP code(s): 49818, 49837, 49872, 49878, 49880
- Area code: 906
- FIPS code: 26-04900
- GNIS feature ID: 1625875

Baldwin Township is a civil township of Delta County in the U.S. state of Michigan. As of the 2020 census, the township population was 700, slightly down from 759 at the 2010 census.

== Communities ==
- Beaver is an unincorporated community in the township at 45°59′08″N 87°06′36″W. Beaver was established in 1872. It was named for numerous beaver dams near the town site.
- Perkins is the village where the Township Hall is located.
- St. Nicholas is an unincorporated community located west of Beaver, established in 1912 surrounding the site of St. Nicholas Cemetery, straddling Baldwin and Maple Ridge Townships.
- Winde

== Geography ==
According to the United States Census Bureau, the township has a total area of 84.2 square miles (218 km^{2}), of which 83.8 square miles (217 km^{2}) is land and 0.4 square miles (1.0 km^{2}) (0.51%) is water.

== Demographics ==
As of the census of 2000, there were 748 people, 306 households, and 217 families residing in the township. The population density was 8.9 inhabitants per square mile (3.4/km^{2}). There were 460 housing units at an average density of 5.5 per square mile (2.1/km^{2}). The racial makeup of the township was 96.26% White, 2.27% Native American, 0.40% Asian, 0.27% from other races, and 0.80% from two or more races. Hispanic or Latino of any race were 0.40% of the population.

There were 306 households, out of which 27.1% had children under the age of 18 living with them, 63.4% were married couples living together, 5.9% had a female householder with no husband present, and 28.8% were non-families. 27.1% of all households were made up of individuals, and 10.5% had someone living alone who was 65 years of age or older. The average household size was 2.44 and the average family size was 2.95.

In the township the population was spread out, with 22.1% under the age of 18, 8.3% from 18 to 24, 26.3% from 25 to 44, 30.9% from 45 to 64, and 12.4% who were 65 years of age or older. The median age was 41 years. For every 100 females, there were 114.3 males. For every 100 females age 18 and over, there were 111.2 males.

The median income for a household in the township was $35,917, and the median income for a family was $42,969. Males had a median income of $40,865 versus $21,563 for females. The per capita income for the township was $17,532. About 3.4% of families and 3.9% of the population were below the poverty line, including 0.7% of those under age 18 and 3.1% of those age 65 or over.
