= Narenta, Michigan =

- Unincorporated community
- Location within the state of Michigan
- Coordinates: 45°43′35″N 87°14′33″W
- Country: United States
- State: Michigan
- County: Delta
- Township: Ford River
- Elevation: 699 ft (213 m)
- Time zone: UTC-5 (Eastern (EST))
  - Summer (DST): UTC-4 (EDT)
- ZIP code(s): 49807
- Area code: 906
- GNIS feature ID: 1617734

Narenta is an unincorporated community in Delta County, in the U.S. state of Michigan.

== History ==
The community was named after the Narenta river in Europe.
