= West Gladstone =

West Gladstone may refer to:

- West Gladstone, Queensland in Australia
- West Gladstone, Michigan in the United States of America
