= BRH =

BRH could refer to:

- Banque de la République d'Haïti
- Bark River-Harris School District
- Bethlem Royal Hospital
- Borth railway station, Wales; National Rail station code BRH.
- Brahui language; ISO 639-3 language code brh.
- Brookhaven (Amtrak station), Mississippi, United States; Amtrak station code BRH.
- Hydrogen bromide
- Blonde Redhead, a band
