= West Gladstone, Michigan =

- Unincorporated community
- Location within the state of Michigan
- Coordinates: 45°50′26″N 87°03′45″W
- Country: United States
- State: Michigan
- County: Delta
- Township: Escanaba
- Elevation: 715 ft (218 m)
- Time zone: UTC-5 (Eastern (EST))
  - Summer (DST): UTC-4 (EDT)
- ZIP code(s): 49837
- Area code: 906
- GNIS feature ID: 1616114

West Gladstone is an unincorporated community in Delta County, in the U.S. state of Michigan.

== History ==
West Gladstone was named from its location west of Gladstone, Michigan.
