= Maple Ridge Township, Delta County, Michigan =

Maple Ridge Township, Michigan
- Civil township
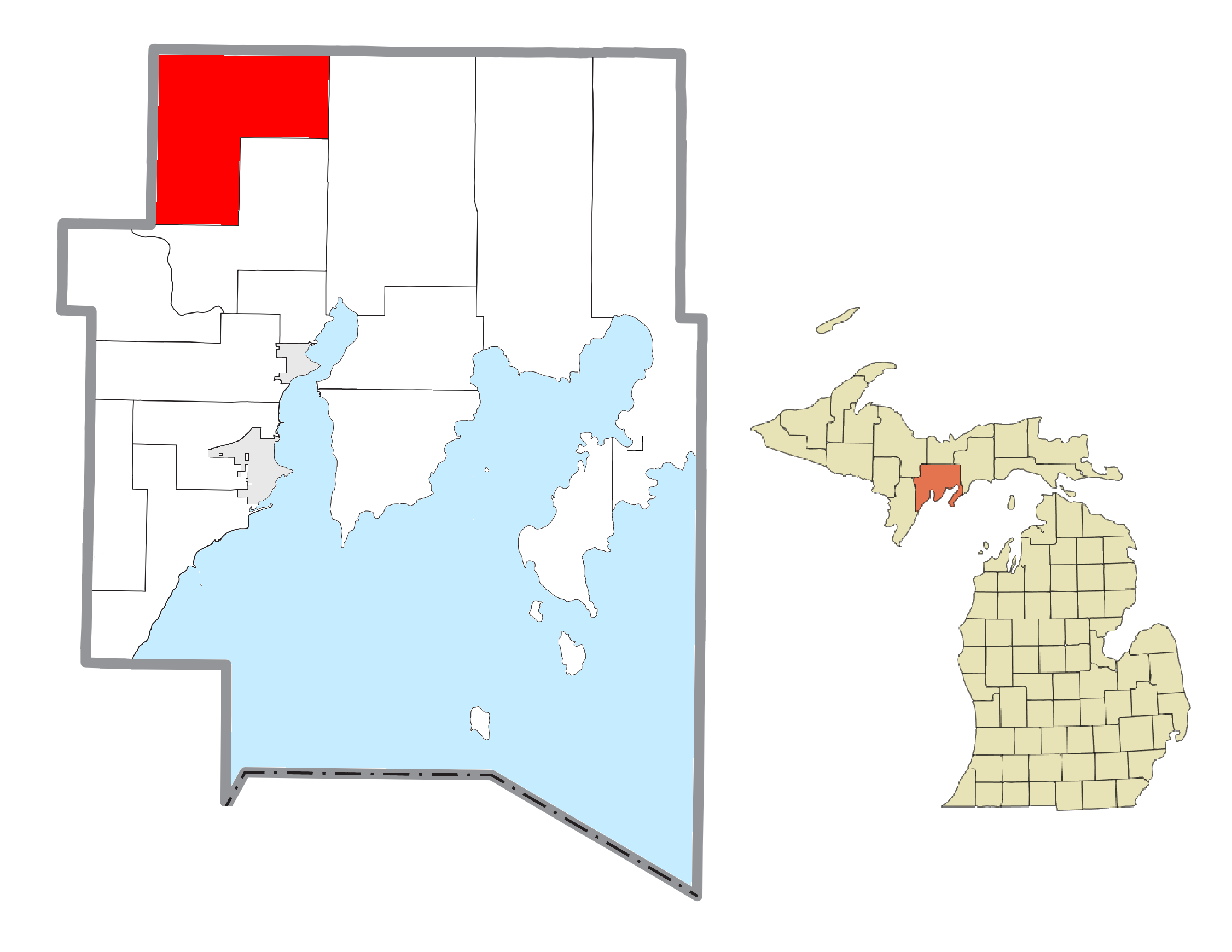
- Location within Delta County

- Location within the state of Michigan Maple Ridge Township (the United States)
- Coordinates: 46°05′38″N 87°08′56″W
- Country: United States
- State: Michigan
- County: Delta

Government
  - Supervisor: Mike Lepisto

Area
  - Total: 108.2 sq mi (280.3 km^{2})
  - Land: 108.2 sq mi (280.3 km^{2})
  - Water: 0 sq mi (0.0 km^{2})
- Elevation: 932 ft (284 m)

Population (2020)
  - Total: 694
  - Density: 6.41/sq mi (2.48/km^{2})
- Time zone: UTC-5 (Eastern (EST))
  - Summer (DST): UTC-4 (EDT)
- ZIP code(s): 49878, 49880
- Area code: 906
- FIPS code: 26-51260
- GNIS feature ID: 1626678
- Website: https://www.townshipmapleridge.org/

Maple Ridge Township is a civil township of Delta County in the U.S. state of Michigan. The population was 694 at the 2020 census, down from 766 at the 2010 census.

Maple Ridge Township was named from a hill where sugar maple trees grew.

== Communities ==
- Defiance was a station on the Chicago and Northwestern Railroad that had a post office starting in 1888.
- Rock in an unincorporated community and census-designated place located along M-35 and the Canadian National Railway, 16.5 miles (26.6 km) north-northwest of Gladstone. It has a post office with ZIP code 49880.
- St. Nicholas was a community settled in 1912 by immigrants from Belgium. Ten acres were donated for a church and cemetery, located north of Saint Nicholas 31st Road on the east side of Summer Meadow G 5 Road. Plans were ambitious to build a large church. However, money ran out and a roof was put over the basement and that served as the church. Later the building was demolished and the people worshipped at St. Joseph Catholic Church in Perkins. The cemetery, that was likely adjacent to the church, still exists and is the burial place for St. Nicholas' early settlers.

== Geography ==
According to the United States Census Bureau, the township has a total area of 108.2 square miles (280.3 km^{2}), all land.

== Demographics ==
At the 2000 census, there were 808 people, 336 households and 234 families residing in the township. The population density was 7.5 per square mile (2.9/km^{2}). There were 537 housing units at an average density of 5.0 per square mile (1.9/km^{2}). The racial makeup of the township was 96.91% White, 1.11% Native American, 0.62% Asian, and 1.36% from two or more races. Hispanic or Latino of any race were 0.50% of the population.

There were 336 households, of which 26.5% had children under the age of 18 living with them, 58.3% were married couples living together, 7.4% had a female householder with no husband present, and 30.1% were non-families. 26.8% of all households were made up of individuals, and 12.2% had someone living alone who was 65 years of age or older. The average household size was 2.40 and the average family size was 2.90.

23.3% of the population were under the age of 18, 5.1% from 18 to 24, 27.6% from 25 to 44, 29.1% from 45 to 64, and 15.0% who were 65 years of age or older. The median age was 42 years. For every 100 females, there were 98.0 males. For every 100 females age 18 and over, there were 103.9 males.

The median household income was $36,050 and the median family income was $38,594. Males had a median income of $31,250 with $21,591 for females. The per capita income for the township was $17,664. About 9.3% of families and 13.0% of the population were below the poverty line, including 14.1% of those under age 18 and 12.7% of those age 65 or over.
