= Hannahville Indian Community =

Hannahville Indian Community Wigwas zibiwniyek
- Indian reservation
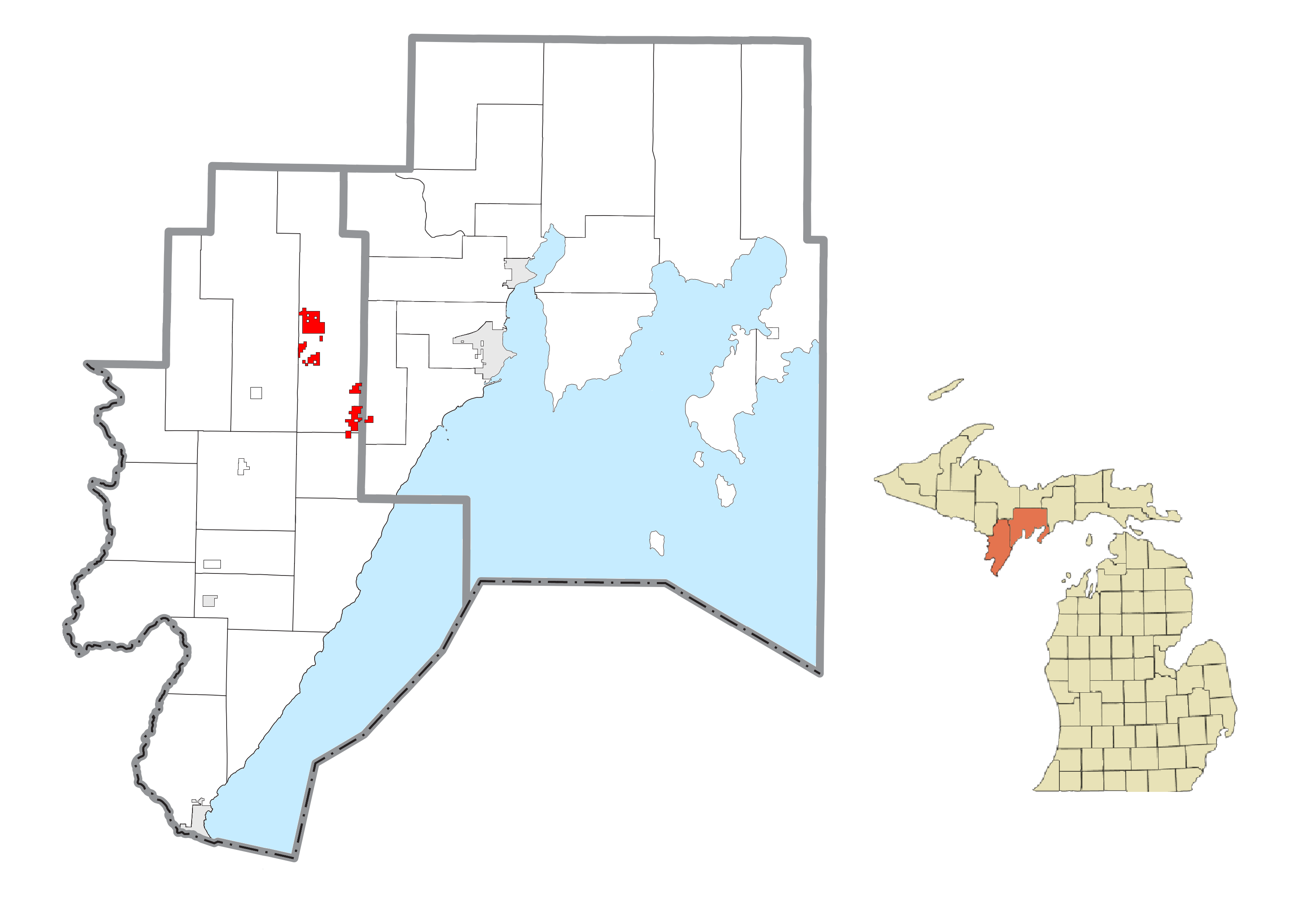
- Locations within Menominee County (left) and Delta County (right)

- Location within the state of Michigan Location within the United States
- Coordinates: 45°38′52″N 87°20′42″W
- Country: United States
- State: Michigan
- Counties: Delta and Menominee
- Founded: 1870

Government
  - Type: Tribal council
  - Chairperson: Kenneth Meshigaud

Area
  - Total: 9.14 sq mi (23.67 km^{2})
  - Land: 9.14 sq mi (23.67 km^{2})
  - Water: 0 sq mi (0 km^{2})

Population (2020)
  - Total: 720
  - Density: 78.77/sq mi (30.41/km^{2})
- Time zone: UTC−6 (Central (CST))
  - Summer (DST): UTC−5 (CDT)
- ZIP code(s): 49807 (Bark River); 49874 (Powers); 49896 (Wilson)
- Area code: 906
- Website: Official website

The Hannahville Indian Community (Potawatomi: Wigwas zibiwniyek) is a federally recognized Potawatomi tribe residing in Michigan's Upper Peninsula, approximately 15 miles (24 km) west of Escanaba on a 8.58-square-mile (22.22 km^{2}) reservation. The reservation, at 45°46′59″N 87°25′23″W, lies mostly in Harris Township in eastern Menominee County; small parts are also located in northeastern Gourley Township in Menominee County and in Bark River Township in adjacent southwestern Delta County.

The 2020 census reported a resident population of 720 persons within its territory, most of whom were of Native American heritage. As of June 3, 2013, the tribe had an enrolled membership of 891 people.

== History ==
The people of Hannahville are descendants of Potawatomi tribespeople who refused to leave Michigan in 1834 for Indian Territory during the great Indian removal. For a period, they moved away from Michigan, living with the Menominee in northern Wisconsin and the Ojibwe and Ottawa peoples in Canada. The Potawatomi, the Ojibwe, and Odawa are part of the Council of the Three Fires. In 1853, some Potawatomie returned to Michigan. It was at this time that they settled along the mouth of the Big Cedar River near Lake Michigan.

According to the United Methodist Church, Peter Marksman was sent to the area as an assistant minister. During this time, he was credited with finding a parcel of land and moving the Potawatomi people to the current location. Some church records report that, as the Potawatomi were very fond of Marksman's wife, Hannah, they named their community after her.

== Hannahville Community ==
The first designation of this area as specifically Potawatomi land was recorded by the US federal government in 1870. The reservation was established by an act of Congress in 1913.

Under the Indian Reorganization Act of 1934, the tribe wrote a constitution and organized an elected form of government. The federal government officially recognized it in 1937. Members elect a 12-person tribal council, which makes policy decisions for the community.

In 1966, the tribe joined with three others in Michigan to establish the Inter-Tribal Council of Michigan, Inc. Other founding members were the Keweenaw Bay Indian Community, the Bay Mills Indian Community, and the Saginaw Chippewa Indian Tribe. These small tribes wanted to work together for joint welfare, to manage joint projects, and to improve relations with the state and federal governments.

== Reservation improvements ==
In 1966, the reservation acquired electricity for the first time. The "Lights for Christmas Project" was a multi-agency sponsored effort. Agencies involved included the Upper Peninsula Committee for Area Progress (UPCAP), the Community Action Agency, the Bureau of Indian Affairs, and the Marquette Catholic Diocese. In December 1966, linemen from the Alger-Delta Cooperative Electric Association of Gladstone, Michigan, began running electrical lines from the Harris area (i.e., West U.S. 2) onto the Hannahville Indian Reservation. A team of 40 volunteer electricians from throughout the state began wiring 16 reservation homes to receive electricity. All 40 electricians were members of the International Brotherhood of Electricians. The 16 homes were completed and ready for "flipping the switch" late that evening. On December 23, 1966, at 3 p.m. EST, a few local county officials and community members watched as "hotlines" were activated at Hannahville for the first time, the cable installation completed on the same day.

== Geography ==
According to the United States Census Bureau, the Hannahville Indian Community in 2020 had an area of 5.57 square miles (3,560 acres; 14.4 km^{2}), all of it land. The community also had 3.57 square miles (2,280 acres; 9.2 km^{2}) of off-reservation trust land. The combined reservation and off-reservation trust land have a total area of 9.14 square miles (23.7 km^{2}).

== Demographics ==
As of the census of 2020, the population of the Hannahville Indian Community and off-reservation trust land was 720. Of these residents, 325 lived within the community, and 395 lived on off-reservation trust land. The population density was 78.8 inhabitants per square mile (30.4/km^{2}). There were 262 housing units at an average density of 28.7 per square mile (11.1/km^{2}). The racial makeup of the reservation and off-reservation trust land was 75.1% Native American, 13.1% White, 0.1% Black or African American, 0.1% from other races, and 11.5% from two or more races. Ethnically, the population was 2.4% Hispanic or Latino of any race.

According to the 1990 Census of Population and Housing for Michigan, the per capita income for the Hannahville community in 1989 was $4,625, whereas the per capita for the state of Michigan was $14,154.

Approximately 100 additional members live nearby and access services on the Reservation. Since the late 20th century, the Tribe has been committed to developing environmental protection programs to ensure a healthy and safe environment for current and future generations.

== Education ==
Hannahville Indian School is the tribal school.

== See also ==
- Anishinaabe
- Council of Three Fires
- Potawatomi
