= Rock, Michigan =

- Census-designated place (CDP) & unincorporated community
- Location within the state of Michigan
- Coordinates: 46°04′08″N 87°09′58″W
- Country: United States
- State: Michigan
- County: Delta
- Township: Maple Ridge

Area
  - Total: 0.90 sq mi (2.33 km^{2})
  - Land: 0.90 sq mi (2.33 km^{2})
  - Water: 0 sq mi (0.00 km^{2})
- Elevation: 968 ft (295 m)

Population (2020)
  - Total: 181
  - Density: 200.8/sq mi (77.54/km^{2})
- Time zone: UTC-5 (Eastern (EST))
  - Summer (DST): UTC-4 (EDT)
- ZIP code(s): 49880
- Area code: 906
- GNIS feature ID: 636073

Rock is an unincorporated community in Delta County, Michigan, United States. As of the 2020 census, Rock had a population of 181. Rock is located in Maple Ridge Township along M-35 and the Canadian National Railway, 16.5 miles (26.6 km) north-northwest of Gladstone. Rock has a post office with ZIP code 49880.

== Demographics ==
Historical population
Census	Pop.	Note	%±
2020	181		—
U.S. Decennial Census

== History ==
Rock was first settled in 1865 by Chicago and North Western Railway workers. J.R. Steele bought land in the community from the railroad in 1866 and settled there, and George English built a store there in the same year. The community was originally called Malton Spur, and a post office called Malton operated from March 28, 1879, to April 30, 1883; Henrietta Crawford served as postmaster of this post office. The community was then renamed Maple Ridge, but changed its name again to Rock when applying for a new post office. The new name was coined by John Niequist and was derived from the rocky terrain in the area. The new post office opened on June 16, 1886, with Niequist as postmaster.

== Climate ==
This climatic region is typified by large seasonal temperature differences, with warm to hot (and often humid) summers and cold (sometimes severely cold) winters. According to the Köppen Climate Classification system, Rock has a humid continental climate, abbreviated "Dfb" on climate maps.
