= Gary Chaison =

American academic (1943–2022)

Gary N. Chaison (born October 21, 1943 – February 17, 2022) was an industrial relations scholar and labor historian at Clark University. Chaison died on February 17, 2022.

== Early life and education ==
Chaison was born in 1943 to Alfred and Ada Chaison, a Jewish family living in Brooklyn.

He obtained his bachelor's degree in 1965 and his Master of Business Administration in 1966, both from the City College of New York. He received his Ph.D. in 1972 from SUNY-Buffalo.

He is married to historian Joanne Danaher Chaison, a former American Antiquarian Society research librarian.

While still working on his doctorate, Chaison was appointed a lecturer at Baruch College in 1968 and in 1970 an assistant professor at SUNY-Buffalo.

In 1973, Chaison was named an assistant professor at the University of New Brunswick. He was promoted to associate professor in 1977.

In 1979, Chaison became a visiting professor at the University of Massachusetts Amherst.

Chaison was appointed professor of management studies at Clark University in 1981.

== Research focus ==
Chaison's research focus has been on union mergers and the impact these have on union viability, union democracy, and perceptions of legitimacy. His first book, When Unions Merge (1986), examined the motivations for merger, barriers to merger, negotiations leading to merger, the nature of merger agreements, various mechanisms by which agreements are approved or disapproved by union officers and union members, the governing structures of merged unions, and the outcomes of mergers. Chaison distinguished between two categories of merger: Amalgamation (the joining two or more unions of roughly equal size into a new union) and absorption (in which a small union merges into a large union and loses its identity). The book generated a cottage industry of labor scholars scrutinizing union mergers, and led Chaison to be called the "major scholar of union mergers..."

In 1996, Chaison followed up this groundbreaking work with a transnational study of union mergers, Union Mergers in Hard Times: The View from Five Countries. In this work, Chaison turned his attention to the effectiveness of union mergers. He concluded that mergers do not solve the fundamental problems facing labor unions (such as organizing large numbers of new members or combating the negative effects of globalization), but they do enable unions to rationalize jurisdictions, and to devote more resources to organizing and building political power.

In 2002, Chaison and co-author Barbara Bigelow examined the role legitimacy plays in the life of a union. The question of legitimacy flowed from Chaison's prior examination of union mergers. Did mergers negatively affect a labor organization's legitimacy in the eyes of its members, or in the eyes of the public? And if merger did so, what was the impact on the union's effectiveness in the various fields (such as organizing, servicing and collective bargaining) in which the union was active? In Unions and Legitimacy, Chaison and Bigelow argued that the concept of legitimacy provided a framework for understanding the sources of union strengths and weaknesses, and why some union survival strategies have failed. Chaison and Bigelow concluded that there were three ways in which legitimacy could be obtained: legal recognition, employer recognition, and public approval. Chaison and Bigelow, however, distinguished these three types further by arguing that there are two kinds of legitimacy: Pragmatic legitimacy, which is essentially an assessment of a union's effectiveness, and moral legitimacy, which conferred when people or organization outside the union treats the union as a socially valuable actor. Reviewers called the work "...a fresh and lucid discussion of legitimacy as it applies to labor unions and their role in society."

Chaison recently published his first textbook, Unions in America. Rather than a historic survey, the 2005 work discusses labor unions in the here-and-now by examining what unions do and why they do it. The textbook covers governance structures, how unions organize, the basic strategies of collective bargaining, and how unions attempt to exercise political influence. The book also assesses emerging and continuing trends in organizing, collective bargaining, and union political action.

=== Media influence ===
Despite his relatively low level of academic output, Chaison was widely cited in the mass media. He has been interviewed by such major American newspapers as The New York Times, Los Angeles Times, Chicago Tribune, The Christian Science Monitor, and USA Today, as well as mass-market international media sources such as the Associated Press and MSNBC. His popularity with the mainstream press led a consortium of central Massachusetts universities and colleges to cite his output specifically as an asset to the community. The reach of Chaison's media voice was particularly noted: "An article on the janitors' strike in Los Angeles had a combined circulation of over 9.2 million, and his quotes about the Verizon strike were picked up by over 90 newspapers across the country."

In part, Chaison is utilized as a resource by the mainstream press because he was noticeably pessimistic about the future of the American labor movement. Among his more recent strong statements are:

1. "'The question is, have unions fallen so far and so fast that they can't get up?' said Gary Chaison, a labor specialist at Clark University in Worcester, Mass. 'I give them a 50-50 chance.'"
2. "In many ways, particularly for the U.S. steel industry, it's too little, too late."
3. " 'These are the most important negotiations in the UAW's history,' said Gary Chaison, a labor specialist at Clark University in Worcester, Mass. 'This is where they have to reset their role as a bona fide bargaining agent.' "
4. "It is certainly the beginning of the end of the automobile industry as we knew it."

== Honors and memberships ==
Chaison won a research grant from the Canadian Department of Labour in 1977, 1979 and 1983, and a three-year research grant from the Canada Council from 1975 to 1977. He was also named a scholar with the Canadian Department of Labour in 1975.

Chaison was a member of the Industrial Relations Research Association, Canadian Industrial Relations Association, International Industrial Relations Association and the Academy of Management.

He was a reviewer for the journal Industrial and Labor Relations Review, and is a member of the editorial board of the Journal of Labor Research.

== Publications ==
=== Solely authored books ===
- Union Mergers in Hard Times: The View from Five Countries. Ithaca, N.Y.: Cornell University Press, 1996. ISBN 0-8014-3330-4
- Unions in America. Thousand Oaks, Calif.: Sage Publications, 2005. ISBN 1-4129-2671-8
- When Unions Merge. Lanham, Md.: Lexington Books, 1986. ISBN 0-669-11081-7

=== Co-authored books ===
- Chaison, Gary N. and Bigelow, Barbara J. Unions and Legitimacy. Ithaca, N.Y.: Cornell University Press, 2002. ISBN 0-8014-3512-9
- Chaison, Gary N. and Rose, Joseph B. A Directory of the Presidents of Canadian National Unions, 1911-1972. Fredericton, N.B.: School of Administration, University of New Brunswick, 1977.

=== Solely authored articles ===
- "Information Technology: The Threat to Unions." Journal of Labor Research. 23:2 (2002).
- "Unionism in Canada and the United States in the 21st Century: The Prospects for Revival." Relations Industrielles/Industrial Relations. 56:1 (2002).

=== Co-authored articles ===
- Rose, Joseph and Chaison, Gary. "Linking Union Density and Union Effectiveness: The North American Experience." Industrial Relations. 35:1 (January 1996).
- Rose, Joseph B.; Chaison, Gary N.; and de la Garza, Enrique. "A Comparative Analysis of Public Sector Restructuring in the United States, Canada, Mexico, and the Caribbean." Journal of Labor Research. 21:4 (Fall 2000).
- Chaison, Gary; Sverke, Magnus; and Sjöberg, Anders. "How Union Mergers Affect Membership Participation." Journal of Labor Research. 22:2 (Spring 2001).

=== Solely authored book chapters ===
- "Reforming and Rationalizing Union Structure: New Directions and Unanswered Questions." In The Future of Trade Unionism: International Perspectives on Emerging Union Structures. Magnus Sverke, ed. Hants, England: Ashgate Publishing, 1997.
