= Bark River (Michigan) =

Location
- Country: United States
- State: Michigan
- Region: Upper Peninsula

Physical characteristics
- Source: outflow of Second Lake
  - coordinates: 45.7386°N 87.3192°W
- Mouth: Green Bay
  - coordinates: 45.5725°N 87.24278°W
- Length: 24 mi (39 km)

Bark River is a 23.7-mile-long (38.1 km) river on the Upper Peninsula of the U.S. state of Michigan. The river flows into Green Bay on Lake Michigan in Ford River Township about 15 miles (24 km) southwest of Escanaba at 45°34′22″N 87°14′34″W.

The Bark River rises from the outflow of Second Lake (which is fed by Pine Creek and the outflow of First Lake) on the boundary between Delta County and Menominee County at 45°44′19″N 87°19′09″W. The North Branch Bark River rises in a marshy area just east of Schaffer, Michigan in Bark River Township and joins the main course at 45°43′28″N 87°16′23″W.

The Bark River was named by some of the first railroad engineers in the area who saw a great quantity of bark floating on the water.
