= Bark River, Michigan =

- Unincorporated community
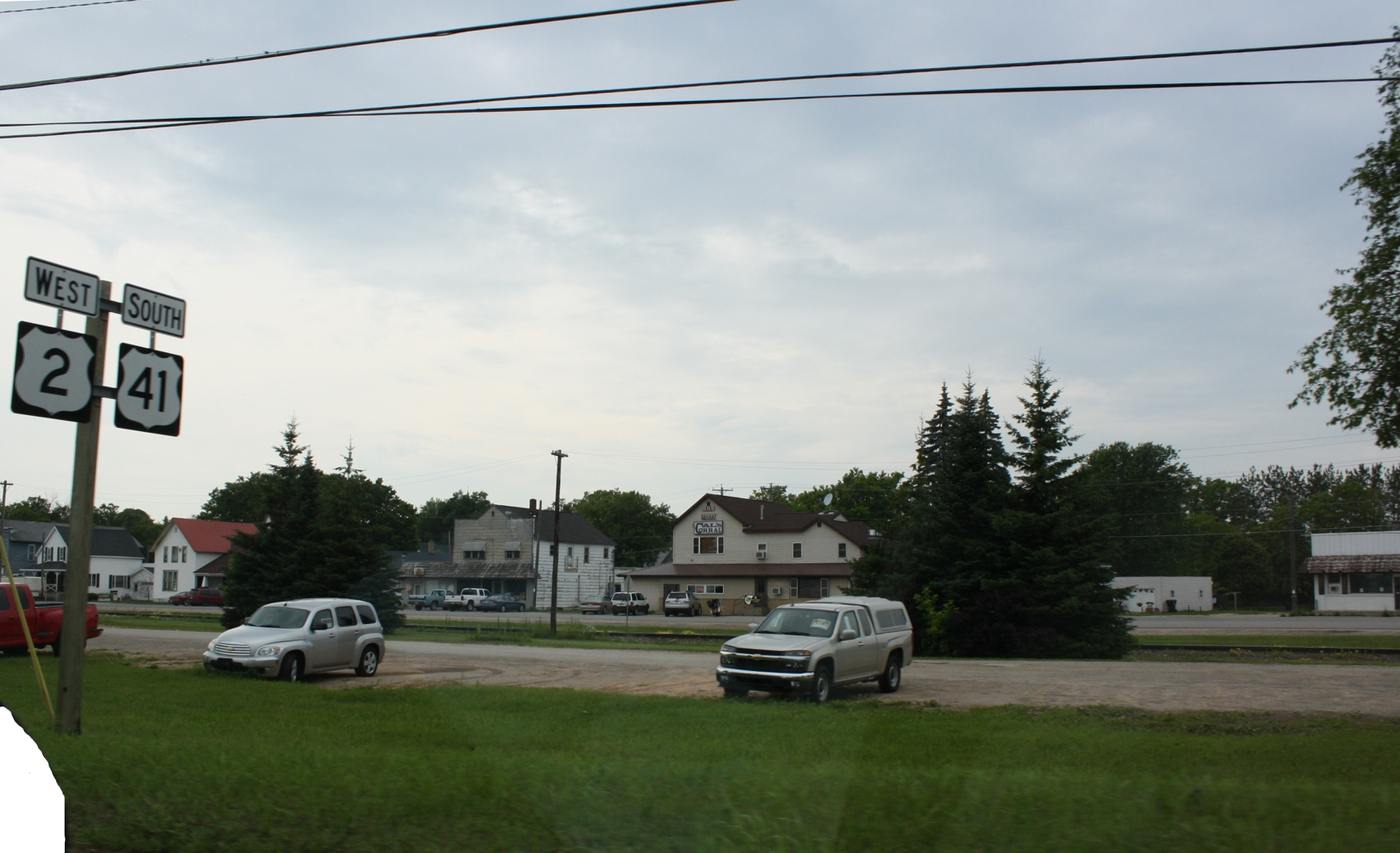
- Downtown Bark River

- Location within the state of Michigan Bark River (the United States)
- Coordinates: 45°42′33″N 87°18′18″W
- Country: United States
- State: Michigan
- County: Delta
- Township: Bark River
- Elevation: 741 ft (226 m)

Population (2020)
  - Total: 1,595
- Time zone: UTC-5 (Eastern (EST))
  - Summer (DST): UTC-4 (EDT)
- ZIP code(s): 49807
- Area code: 906
- FIPS code: 054000
- GNIS feature ID: 620602

Bark River is an unincorporated community located in Delta County in the U.S. state of Michigan. It is located in Bark River Township near the Bark River, from which it is named. It is situated on U.S. Highway 2 and U.S. Highway 41 about 13 miles west of Escanaba and just east of the Hannahville Indian Reservation.

Bark River is at latitude 45° 42' north and longitude 87° 18' west. The ZIP code is 49807 and the FIPS place code is 05400. The elevation is 744 feet above sea level. Nearby Bark River International Raceway has hosted national off-road racing events, most recently the TORC Series.

== History ==
It was first settled in 1871 by civil war hero Captain Charles Pease, who served as an escort and guide for land speculator Lars Kovala at the time. Was given a post office and named Barkville on Nov 30 1877. Its first postmaster was Luke D. McKenna. It was renamed Bark River in 1882. Its first post office was renamed on July 11, 1899.

== Images ==
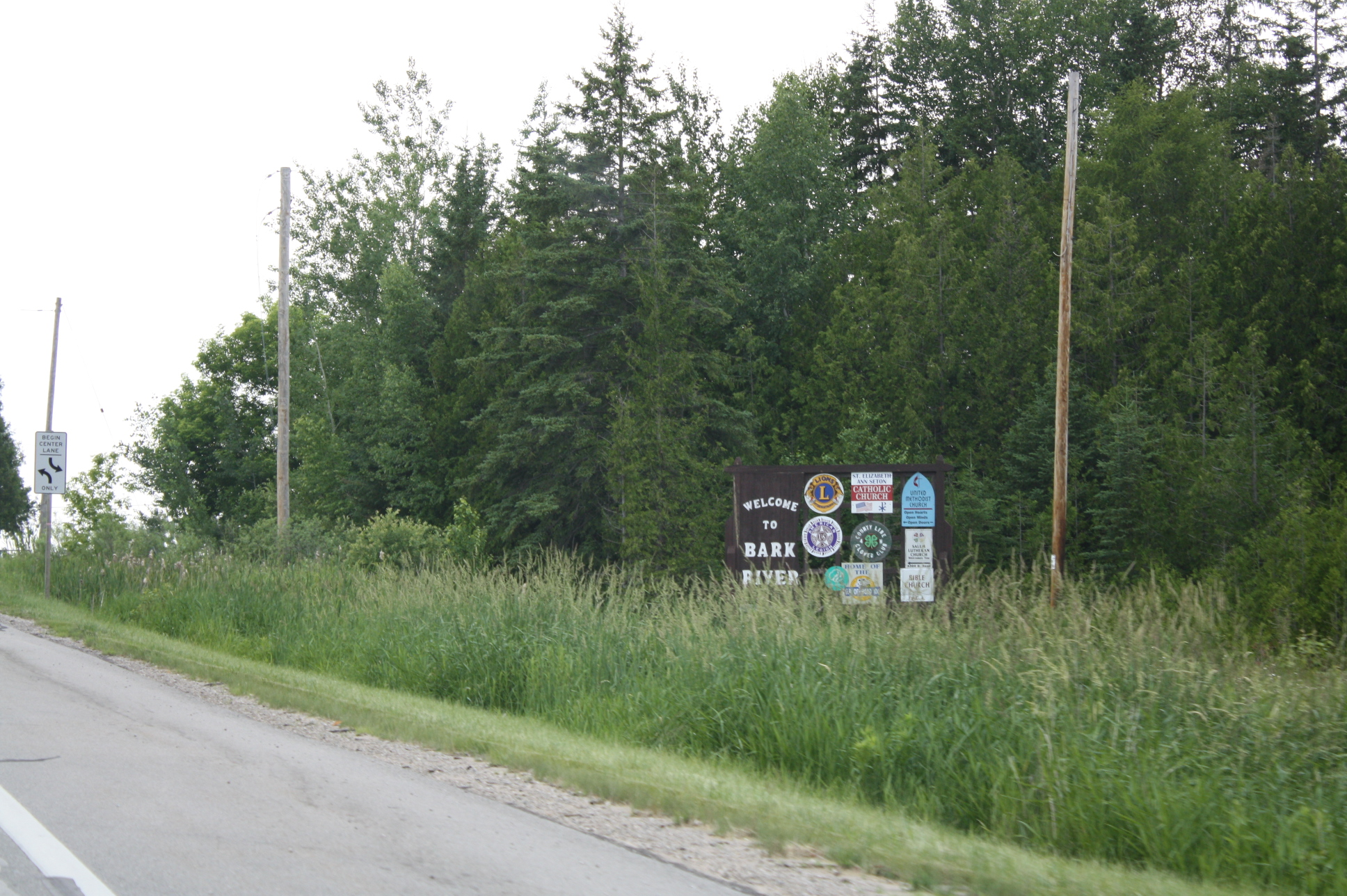
Welcome sign

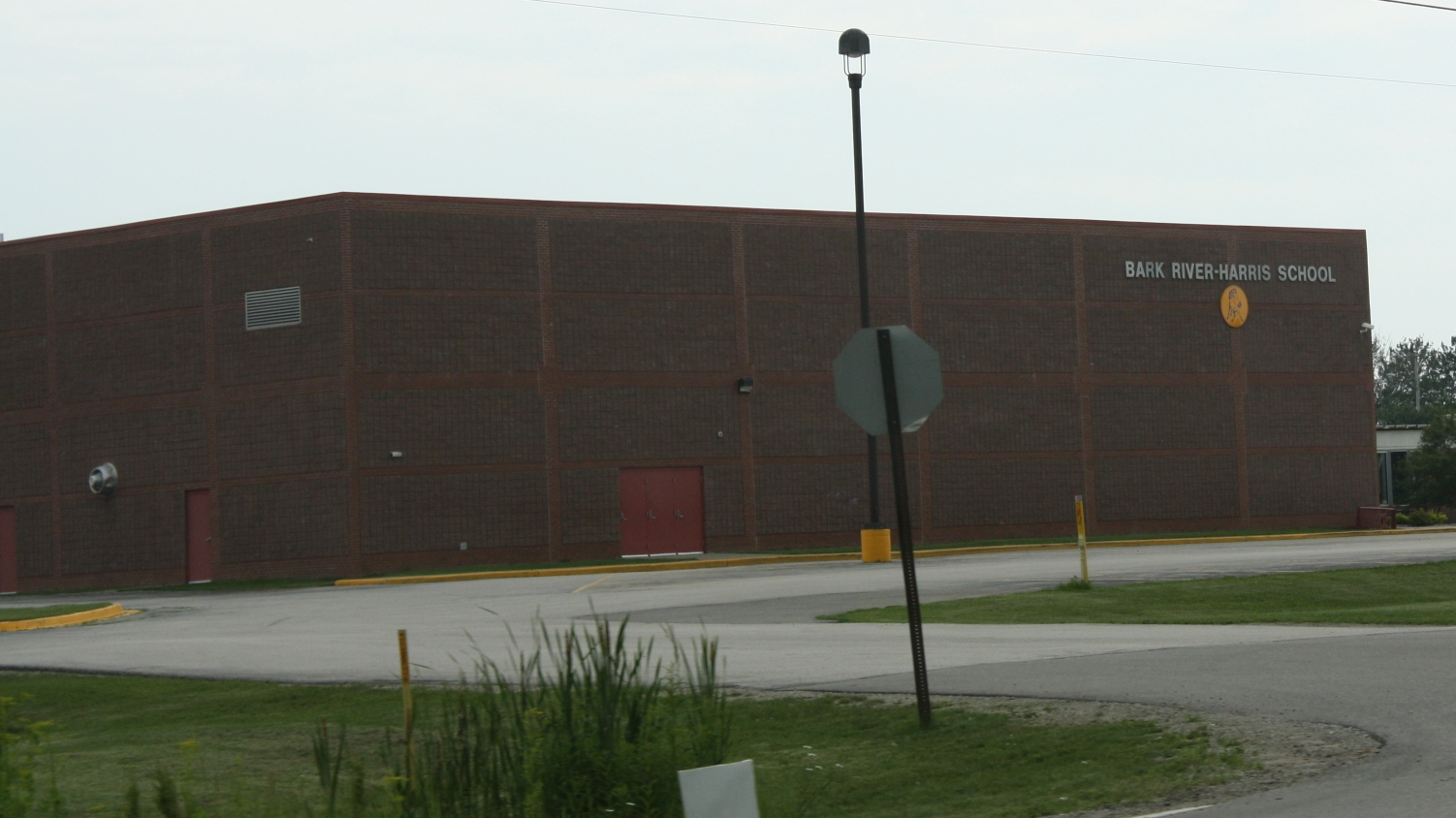
Bark River-Harris High School

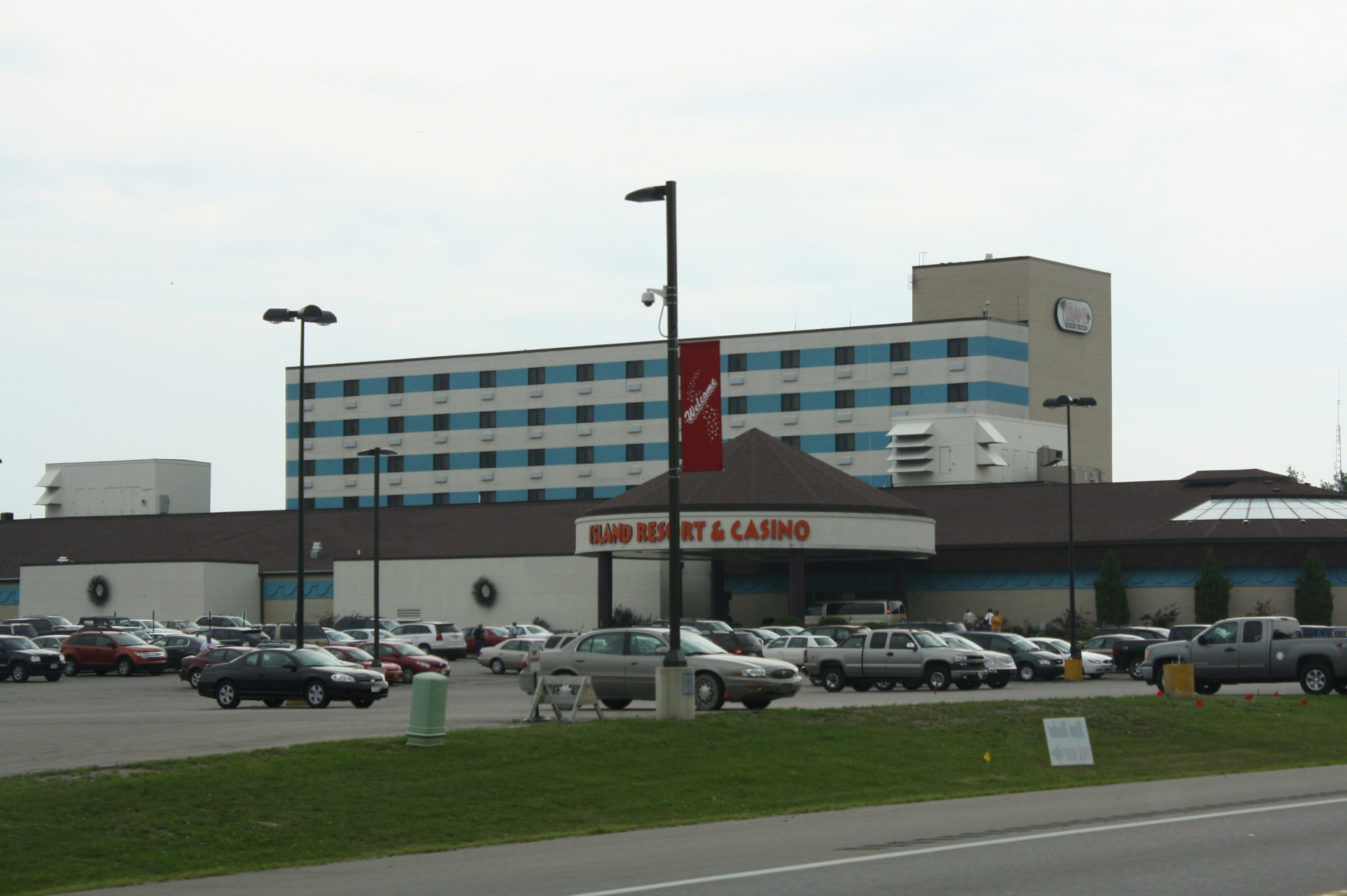
Island Resort & Casino
