= Wilson, Michigan =

- Unincorporated community
- Location within the state of Michigan
- Coordinates: 45°42′19″N 87°26′17″W
- Country: United States
- State: Michigan
- County: Menominee
- Township: Harris
- Elevation: 794 ft (242 m)
- Time zone: UTC-6 (Central (CST))
  - Summer (DST): UTC-5 (CDT)
- ZIP code(s): 49896
- Area code: 906
- GNIS feature ID: 1616553

Wilson is an unincorporated community in Menominee County, Michigan. Wilson is located in Harris Township along U.S. Highway 2 (US 2), US 41 and the Canadian National Railway, 4.5 miles (7.2 km) east-northeast of Powers, Michigan. Wilson has a post office with ZIP code 49896.

== History ==
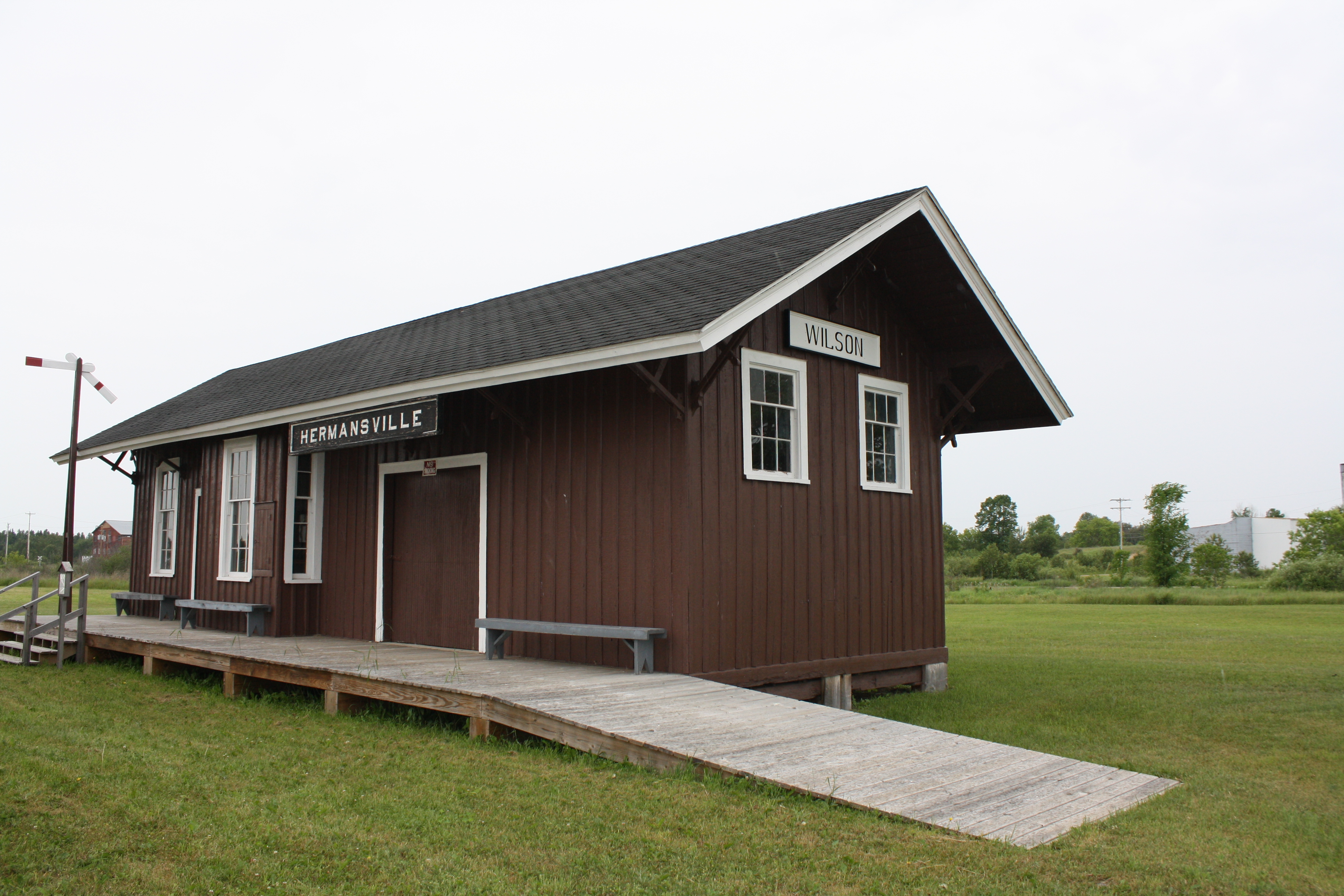
Wilson's former railway station on display at the IXL Historical Museum.

The Chicago and North Western Railway built a station at the community in 1872–73 to serve local charcoal kilns, which was originally called Ferry Switch. The first school in Wilson opened in 1881–82. A post office, originally called Myra, opened in the community on February 24, 1881; Daniel McIntyre was the first postmaster. The post office was renamed to Wilson on November 1, 1881, after local sawmill owner Frank D. Wilson, who then became postmaster. The railway station closed in 1950.

=== Seventh-day Adventist Church ===
The central buildings in the rural Wilson community are the Seventh-day Adventist Church and their affiliated school, which enrolls students grades 1–10. Wilson is home to the largest Adventist church in the Upper Peninsula of Michigan.

In the early 1900s, a group of Adventists from Wisconsin moved into the area and began farming. A church was erected in 1908, whose services were originally held in French by minister R.J. Bellows. However, in 1948, a furnace fire caused the church to be demolished. A new church was built and completed in 1949.

A small area at the back of the church was partitioned off as a schoolroom; however, the space was inadequate, so in 1947, a public school building was purchased from the Ford River Township and moved onto land across from the church. In 1964, the original school was torn down and a new three-room school with a gymnasium was built. The school is still in operation today.

Many of the descendants of those who helped to establish the community by building the church and school still live in the area.

== Education ==
In addition to the church-affiliated school, Wilson is served by the Bark River-Harris School District. Hannahville Indian School, a school founded in response to discrimination towards Native Americans, is also located nearby.
