= Hannahville Indian School =

Tribal school in Michigan, United States

Coordinates: 45.6603°N 87.3436°W

Location
- 15750 Hannahville B-1 Road; Menominee, Michigan 49896

Information
- Motto: Soaring to new heights
- Established: 1976
- Language: Potawatomi
- Nickname: Soaring Eagles
- Website: https://www.hannahvilleschool.net/

Hannahville Indian School is a tribal K–12 school in Hannahville, Harris Township, Michigan. It is affiliated with the Bureau of Indian Education (BIE). Nah Tah Wahsh Public School Academy is a charter school affiliated with the institution. The school serves the Potawotami tribe and the Hannahville Indian Community.

In 1990, it was the only school in Michigan whose students were all Native American.

It is in proximity to Wilson.

The name "Nah Tah Wahsh" means "soaring eagles".

== History ==
Two mothers, Sally Eichhorn and Gloria McCollough, began a campaign to create a tribal school in August 1975 to address the perceived shortcomings of the education of tribal children at Bark River-Harris School. In 1976, the school opened with four teachers. Initially, the school was a K–8 school that occupied two previously unused rooms. The school transitioned from K–8 to K–12 in 1984.

Before and in 1989, the school sought funding from the State of Michigan three times, with the third time being a request for $80,000. Frank Kelley, Attorney General of Michigan, denied these requests. In 1989, he stated that since Hannahville Indian was not under the control of the state itself, it was not considered a public school in Michigan, and therefore could not get state funding as per a 1976 amendment made to the Michigan Constitution, which prohibited the state government from funding schools not considered to be public. Additionally, Kelley stated that the school did not admit non-Native Americans while Ken Pond, the principal of Hannahville Indian, argued that it did.

The Nah Tah Wahsh Public School Academy, which could legally enroll non-Native Americans, opened in 1995.

A youth center was built in 2005.

== Curriculum ==
The school includes tribal culture and customs in addition to academic subjects. The school intends to continue the tribal language; such language instruction began after 1996.

The school offers an Adult Education program.

== Athletics ==
In 1990, the school created a basketball team.

Today, the following sports are offered:

- Soccer (co-ed)
- Volleyball (girls)
- Basketball (boys and girls)
- Cheer (girls)
