= Bark River Township, Michigan =

- Civil township
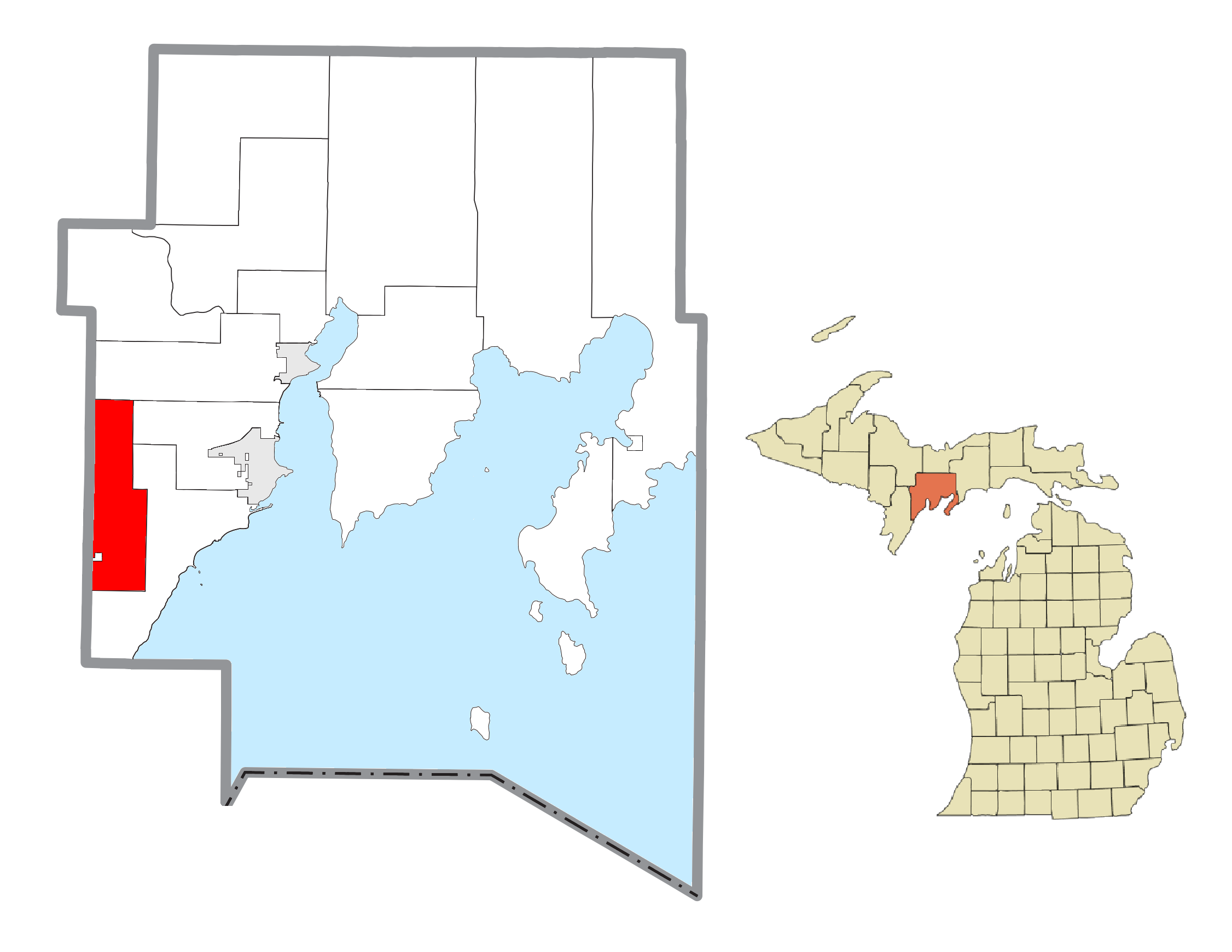
- Location within Delta County

- Location within the state of Michigan Bark River Township (the United States)
- Coordinates: 45°43′32″N 87°17′49″W
- Country: United States
- State: Michigan
- County: Delta

Government
  - Supervisor: Greg Johnson

Area
  - Total: 45.6 sq mi (118.2 km^{2})
  - Land: 45.6 sq mi (118.1 km^{2})
  - Water: 0.039 sq mi (0.1 km^{2})
- Elevation: 709 ft (216 m)

Population (2020)
  - Total: 1,595
  - Density: 34.98/sq mi (13.51/km^{2})
- Time zone: UTC-5 (Eastern (EST))
  - Summer (DST): UTC-4 (EDT)
- ZIP code(s): 49807
- Area code: 906
- FIPS code: 26-05420
- GNIS feature ID: 1625883

Bark River Township is a civil township of Delta County in the U.S. state of Michigan. As of the 2020 census, the township population was 1,595, slightly up from 1,578 at the 2010 census. The township takes its name from the Bark River.

== Communities ==
- Bark River is an unincorporated community within the township, near the Bark River at 45°42′37″N 87°18′17″W. It is situated on US-2 and US-41, about 11 miles west of Escanaba and just east of the Hannahville Indian Community. The ZIP code is 49807.
- Schaffer is an unincorporated community within the township, north of the Bark River at 45°45′40″N 87°17′55″W. It is situated on M-69, about 14 miles northwest of Escanaba. The ZIP code is 49807.

== Geography ==
According to the United States Census Bureau, the township has a total area of 45.6 square miles (118 km^{2}), of which 45.6 square miles (118 km^{2}) is land and 0.1 square miles (0.26 km^{2}) (0.13%) is water.

=== Climate ===
Second Lake

Climate chart (precipitation, max. and min. temperature)
J	F	M	A	M	J	J	A	S	O	N	D
57 −8 −13	44 −6 −14	51 −1 −9	83 10 −2	69 15 4	92 19 11	103 23 14	82 23 12	102 18 10	107 10 2	84 3 −2	59 −4 −8
- █ Average max. and min. temperatures in °C
- █ Precipitation totals in mm
Imperial conversion
J	F	M	A	M	J	J	A	S	O	N	D
2.2 18 9	1.7 21 7	2 30 16	3.3 50 28	2.7 59 39	3.6 66 52	4.1 73 57	3.2 73 54	4 64 50	4.2 50 36	3.3 37 28	2.3 25 18
- █ Average max. and min. temperatures in °F
- █ Precipitation totals in inches

== Demographics ==
As of the census of 2000, there were 1,650 people, 612 households, and 479 families residing in the township. The population density was 36.2 inhabitants per square mile (14.0/km^{2}). There were 680 housing units at an average density of 14.9 per square mile (5.8/km^{2}). The racial makeup of the township was 95.09% White, 0.12% African American, 2.67% Native American, 0.36% Asian, 0.24% from other races, and 1.52% from two or more races. Hispanic or Latino of any race were 0.18% of the population.

There were 612 households, out of which 37.6% had children under the age of 18 living with them, 66.5% were married couples living together, 8.2% had a female householder with no husband present, and 21.7% were non-families. 19.3% of all households were made up of individuals, and 7.2% had someone living alone who was 65 years of age or older. The average household size was 2.68 and the average family size was 3.05.

In the township the population was spread out, with 26.9% under the age of 18, 8.5% from 18 to 24, 28.8% from 25 to 44, 25.3% from 45 to 64, and 10.5% who were 65 years of age or older. The median age was 36 years. For every 100 females, there were 106.0 males. For every 100 females age 18 and over, there were 105.8 males.

The median income for a household in the township was $41,477, and the median income for a family was $45,221. Males had a median income of $32,083 versus $23,188 for females. The per capita income for the township was $16,649. About 3.7% of families and 5.8% of the population were below the poverty line, including 6.3% of those under age 18 and 8.0% of those age 65 or over.

== Education ==
It is in the Bark River-Harris School District.

== Transportation ==
Indian Trails provides daily intercity bus service via Bark River between St. Ignace and Ironwood, Michigan.
