= St. John the Evangelist Catholic Church (Ishpeming, Michigan) =

Ishpeming

Coordinates: 46°29′16.5″N 87°40′9″W

St. John the Evangelist Church

St. John the Evangelist Church is part of the Roman Catholic Diocese of Marquette and was the first Catholic Church to be built in Ishpeming, Michigan.

== History ==
The church was built under the direction of Father Honoratus Bourion, the pastor of St. Paul’s Church in Negaunee. The building of the church began in 1869 and was completed one year later. In the spring of 1927, the old wooden structure that had served the community for so many years was torn down. A new brick building was erected and on February 14, 1928, the new St. John’s was dedicated by Bishop Joseph G. Pinten, Ordinary of the Roman Catholic Diocese of Grand Rapids.

The parish was originally a mission parish of St. Paul Parish in Negaunee. The French members of the parish left to form St. Joseph Parish in 1890. Its mission church, St. Pius X in North Lake, subsequently became its own parish.
