= Ford River Township, Michigan =

- Civil township
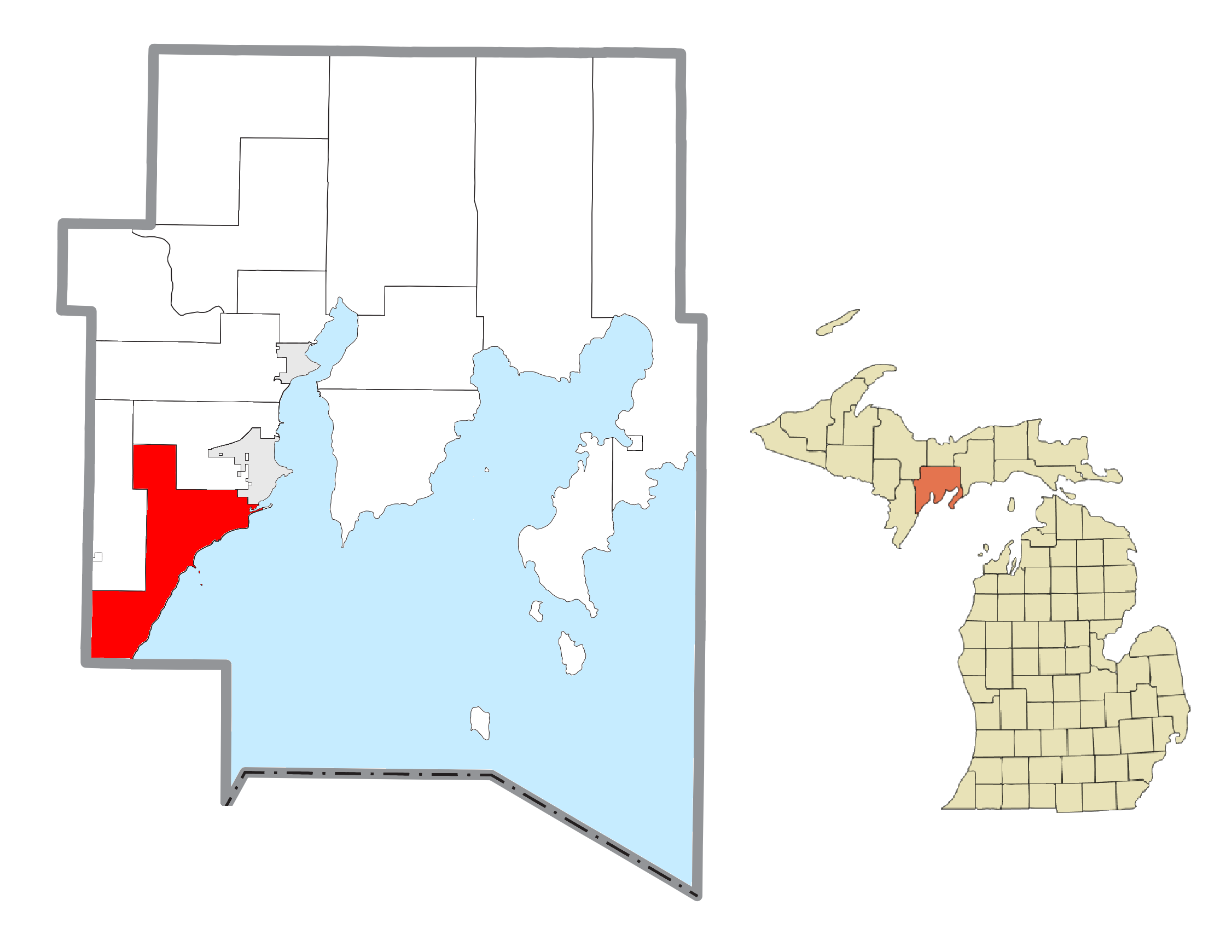
- Location within Delta County

- Location within the state of Michigan Ford River Township (the United States)
- Coordinates: 45°40′00″N 87°10′43″W
- Country: United States
- State: Michigan
- County: Delta

Government
  - Supervisor: Steve Nelson
  - Clerk: Debbi Brown
  - Treasurer: Amanda Wagner
  - Trustee: Jayne Church
  - Trustee: Randy Scott

Area
  - Total: 65.3 sq mi (169.0 km^{2})
  - Land: 64.8 sq mi (167.9 km^{2})
  - Water: 0.46 sq mi (1.2 km^{2})
- Elevation: 646 ft (197 m)

Population (2020)
  - Total: 2,019
  - Density: 31.14/sq mi (12.03/km^{2})
- Time zone: UTC-5 (Eastern (EST))
  - Summer (DST): UTC-4 (EDT)
- ZIP code(s): 49807, 49812, 49829
- Area code: 906
- FIPS code: 26-29380
- GNIS feature ID: 1626292
- Website: Official website

Ford River Township is a civil township of Delta County in the U.S. state of Michigan. Its population was 2,019 at the 2020 census, down from 2,054 at the 2010 census.

== Geography ==
According to the United States Census Bureau, the township has a total area of 65.3 square miles (169 km^{2}), of which 64.8 square miles (168 km^{2}) is land and 0.4 square miles (1.0 km^{2}) (0.69%) is water.

== Demographics ==
As of the census of 2000, there were 2,241 people, 909 households, and 675 families residing in the township. The population density was 34.6 inhabitants per square mile (13.4/km^{2}). There were 1,098 housing units at an average density of 16.9 per square mile (6.5/km^{2}). The racial makeup of the township was 96.52% White, 0.13% African American, 1.52% Native American, 0.31% Asian, 0.04% Pacific Islander, 0.18% from other races, and 1.29% from two or more races. Hispanic or Latino of any race were 0.36% of the population.

There were 909 households, out of which 28.4% had children under the age of 18 living with them, 65.0% were married couples living together, 5.4% had a female householder with no husband present, and 25.7% were non-families. 21.0% of all households were made up of individuals, and 7.8% had someone living alone who was 65 years of age or older. The average household size was 2.47 and the average family size was 2.84.

In the township the population was spread out, with 21.6% under the age of 18, 7.3% from 18 to 24, 25.4% from 25 to 44, 29.9% from 45 to 64, and 15.8% who were 65 years of age or older. The median age was 42 years. For every 100 females, there were 102.6 males. For every 100 females age 18 and over, there were 105.1 males.

The median income for a household in the township was $42,260, and the median income for a family was $47,837. Males had a median income of $39,625 versus $22,298 for females. The per capita income for the township was $25,299. About 3.2% of families and 5.2% of the population were below the poverty line, including 4.5% of those under age 18 and 9.5% of those age 65 or over.
