= Perkins, Michigan =

- Unincorporated community
- Location within the state of Michigan
- Coordinates: 45°58′40″N 87°04′19″W
- Country: United States
- State: Michigan
- County: Delta
- Township: Baldwin
- Elevation: 784 ft (239 m)
- Time zone: UTC-5 (Eastern (EST))
  - Summer (DST): UTC-4 (EDT)
- ZIP code(s): 49872
- Area code: 906
- GNIS feature ID: 1621214

Perkins is an unincorporated community in Delta County, Michigan, United States. Perkins is located in Baldwin Township along M-35, 9 miles (14 km) north-northwest of Gladstone. Perkins has a post office with ZIP code 49872.

== History ==
Perkins was founded around 1872 by the Cascade Company, which made charcoal kilns and cut lumber in the community. It was originally located on the Whitefish Branch of the Chicago and North Western Railway. A post office opened in Perkins on May 7, 1894; John Fuhriman was the first postmaster. The community was named for Josiah Perkins, an early settler.
