= Delta County, Michigan =

County in Michigan, United States

- County
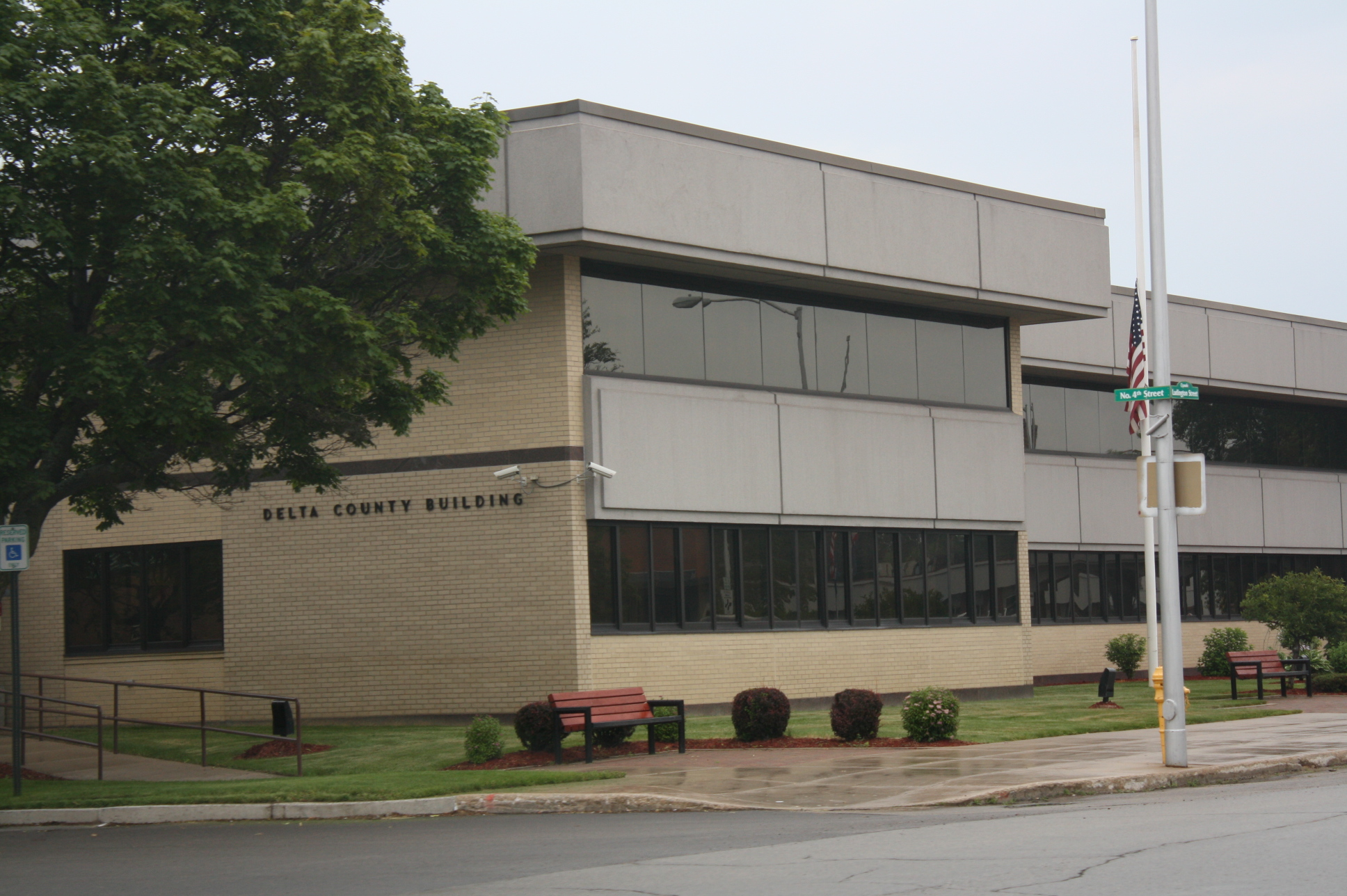
- The Delta County Courthouse in Escanaba in 2010.

- Seal

- Location within the U.S. state of Michigan
- Coordinates: 45°47′N 86°52′W
- Country: United States
- State: Michigan
- Authorized: March 9, 1843
- Organized: 1861
- Named for: Greek letter Delta
- Seat: Escanaba
- Largest city: Escanaba

Area
  - Total: 1,991 sq mi (5,160 km^{2})
  - Land: 1,171 sq mi (3,030 km^{2})
  - Water: 820 sq mi (2,100 km^{2}) 41%

Population (2020)
  - Total: 36,903
  - Estimate (2025): 36,582 ▼
  - Density: 31.51/sq mi (12.17/km^{2})
- Time zone: UTC−5 (Eastern)
  - Summer (DST): UTC−4 (EDT)
- Congressional district: 1st
- Website: deltacountymi.gov

Delta County is a county in the Upper Peninsula in the U.S. state of Michigan. As of the 2020 census, the population was 36,903. The county seat is Escanaba. The county was surveyed in 1843 and organized in 1861. Its name originates from the Greek letter delta (Δ), which refers to the triangular shape of the original county which included segments of Menominee, Dickinson, Iron, and Marquette counties. Recreation and forest products are major industries, and crops include hay, corn, small grains, potatoes, and strawberries. Delta County comprises the Escanaba, MI Micropolitan Statistical Area.

== Geography ==
According to the U.S. Census Bureau, the county has a total area of 1,991 square miles (5,160 km^{2}), of which 1,171 square miles (3,030 km^{2}) is land and 820 square miles (2,100 km^{2}) (41%) is water. It is the fifth-largest county in Michigan by land area.

=== Adjacent counties ===
By land

- Menominee County (southwest, Central Time Zone border)
- Marquette County (northwest)
- Alger County (north)
- Schoolcraft County (east)

By water

- Leelanau County (southeast)
- Door County, Wisconsin (south, Central Time Zone border)

=== National protected area ===
- Hiawatha National Forest (part)

== Communities ==
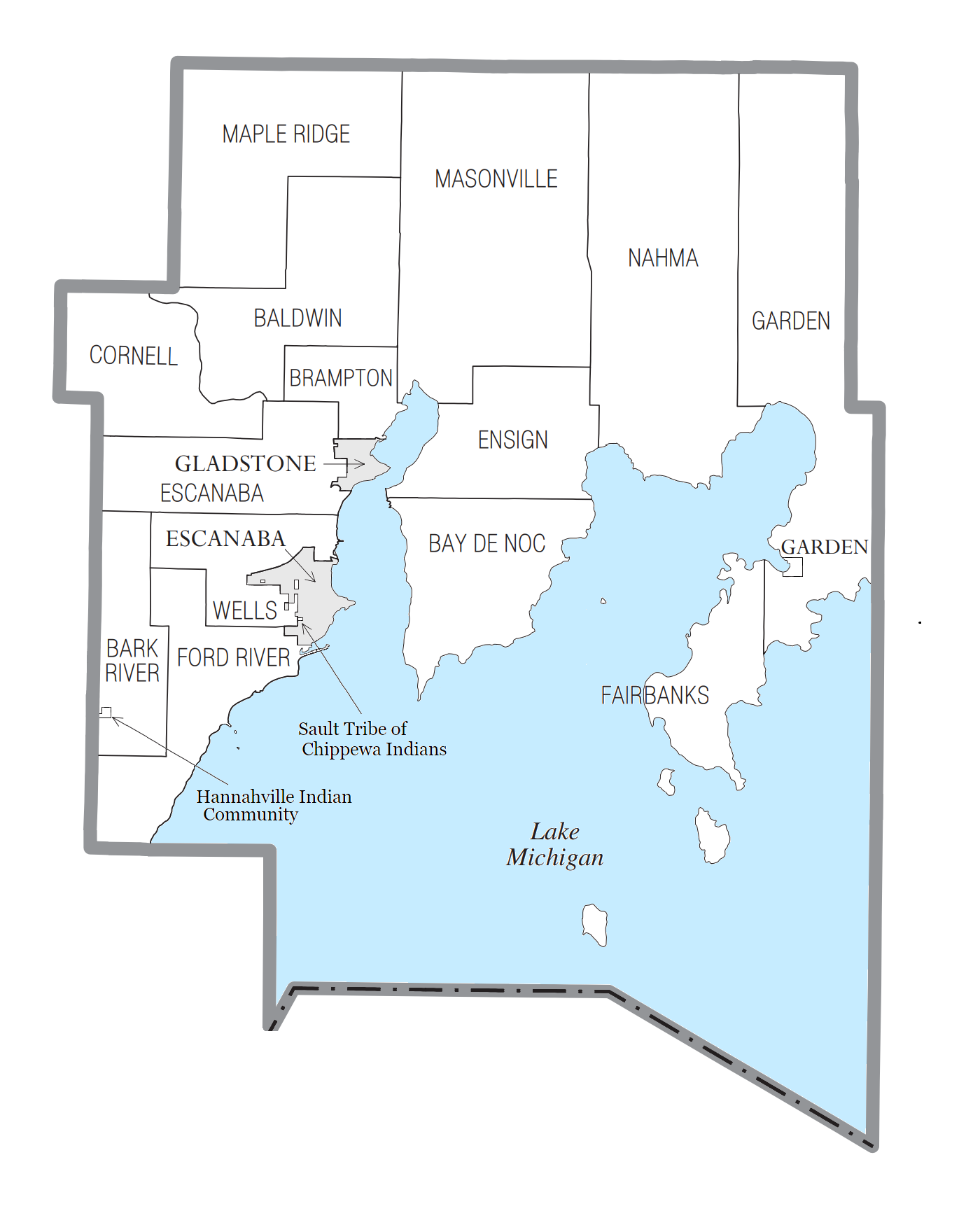
U.S. Census data map showing local municipal boundaries within Delta County. Shaded areas represent incorporated cities.

=== Cities ===
- Escanaba (county seat)
- Gladstone

=== Village ===
- Garden

=== Civil townships ===
- Baldwin Township
- Bark River Township
- Bay de Noc Township
- Brampton Township
- Cornell Township
- Ensign Township
- Escanaba Township
- Fairbanks Township
- Ford River Township
- Garden Township
- Maple Ridge Township
- Masonville Township
- Nahma Township
- Wells Township

=== Census-designated places ===
- Rapid River
- Rock

=== Unincorporated communities ===
- Bark River
- Brampton
- Chaison
- Fairport
- Fayette
- Ford River
- Garden Corners
- Harris
- Hyde
- Isabella
- Island View
- Kipling
- Lake Bluff
- Maplewood
- Nahma
- Narenta
- Perkins
- Perronville
- Riverland
- St. Nicholas
- Schaffer
- Wells
- West Gladstone

=== Indian reservations ===
- A small section of the Hannahville Indian Community, which has most of its territory in neighboring Menominee County to the west, extends into Bark River Township.
- The Sault Tribe of Chippewa Indians occupies a very small portion in the southwest city limits of Escanaba.

== Demographics ==
Historical population
Census	Pop.	Note	%±
1860	1,172		—
1870	2,542		116.9%
1880	6,812		168.0%
1890	15,330		125.0%
1900	23,881		55.8%
1910	30,108		26.1%
1920	30,909		2.7%
1930	32,280		4.4%
1940	34,037		5.4%
1950	32,913		−3.3%
1960	34,298		4.2%
1970	35,924		4.7%
1980	38,947		8.4%
1990	37,780		−3.0%
2000	38,520		2.0%
2010	37,069		−3.8%
2020	36,903		−0.4%
2025 (est.)	36,582	▼	−0.9%
US Decennial Census; 1790-1960 1900-1990; 1990-2000 2010-2018

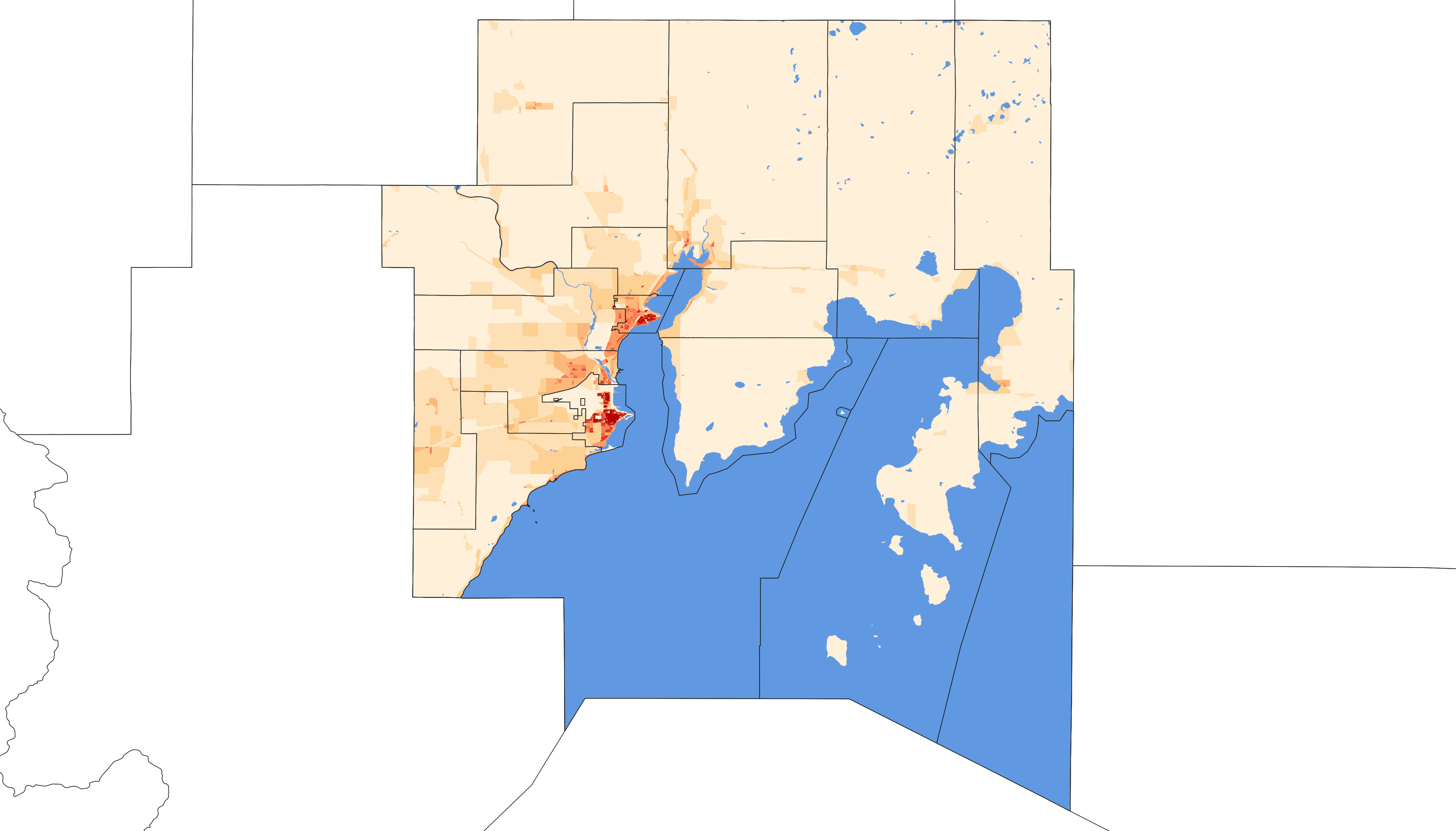
Population density of Delta County MI by 2020 census block

=== Racial and ethnic composition ===
Delta County, Michigan – Racial and ethnic composition Note: the US Census treats Hispanic/Latino as an ethnic category. This table excludes Latinos from the racial categories and assigns them to a separate category. Hispanics/Latinos may be of any race.
Race / Ethnicity (NH = Non-Hispanic)	Pop 1980	Pop 1990	Pop 2000	Pop 2010	Pop 2020	% 1980	% 1990	% 2000	% 2010	% 2020
White alone (NH)	38,208	36,729	36,791	34,920	33,441	98.10%	97.22%	95.51%	94.20%	90.62%
Black or African American alone (NH)	12	15	35	71	93	0.03%	0.04%	0.09%	0.19%	0.25%
Native American or Alaska Native alone (NH)	439	799	841	858	818	1.13%	2.11%	2.18%	2.31%	2.22%
Asian alone (NH)	53	98	120	145	153	0.14%	0.26%	0.31%	0.39%	0.41%
Native Hawaiian or Pacific Islander alone (NH)	x	x	12	7	8	x	x	0.03%	0.02%	0.02%
Other race alone (NH)	132	3	18	7	82	0.34%	0.01%	0.05%	0.02%	0.22%
Mixed race or Multiracial (NH)	x	x	516	743	1,765	x	x	1.34%	2.00%	4.78%
Hispanic or Latino (any race)	103	136	187	318	543	0.26%	0.36%	0.49%	0.86%	1.47%
Total	38,947	37,780	38,520	37,069	36,903	100.00%	100.00%	100.00%	100.00%	100.00%

=== 2020 census ===
As of the 2020 census, the county had a population of 36,903, a median age of 47.8 years, with 19.5% of residents under the age of 18 and 24.9% of residents 65 years of age or older. For every 100 females there were 99.6 males, and for every 100 females age 18 and over there were 98.0 males age 18 and over.

As of the 2020 census, the racial makeup of the county was 91.3% White, 0.3% Black or African American, 2.3% American Indian and Alaska Native, 0.4% Asian, <0.1% Native Hawaiian and Pacific Islander, 0.4% from some other race, and 5.3% from two or more races. Hispanic or Latino residents of any race comprised 1.5% of the population.

As of the 2020 census, 57.3% of residents lived in urban areas, while 42.7% lived in rural areas.

As of the 2020 census, there were 16,290 households in the county, of which 23.2% had children under the age of 18 living in them. Of all households, 48.1% were married-couple households, 20.8% were households with a male householder and no spouse or partner present, and 24.1% were households with a female householder and no spouse or partner present. About 32.9% of all households were made up of individuals and 16.1% had someone living alone who was 65 years of age or older.

As of the 2020 census, there were 19,786 housing units, of which 17.7% were vacant. Among occupied housing units, 78.5% were owner-occupied and 21.5% were renter-occupied. The homeowner vacancy rate was 2.0% and the rental vacancy rate was 6.7%.

=== 2010 census ===
The 2010 United States census indicated Delta County had a population of 37,069.

== Education ==
School districts include:

- Bark River-Harris School District
- Big Bay de Noc School District
- Escanaba Area Public Schools
- Gladstone Area Schools
- Mid Peninsula School District
- Rapid River Public Schools

== Government ==
United States presidential election results for Delta County, Michigan
Year	Republican		Democratic		Third party(ies)	
Year	No.	%	No.	%	No.	%
1884	1,201	66.13%	609	33.54%	6	0.33%
1888	1,587	54.16%	1,332	45.46%	11	0.38%
1892	1,769	54.30%	1,412	43.34%	77	2.36%
1896	2,774	67.81%	1,237	30.24%	80	1.96%
1900	3,081	70.94%	1,210	27.86%	52	1.20%
1904	3,332	79.88%	658	15.78%	181	4.34%
1908	3,243	71.70%	1,097	24.25%	183	4.05%
1912	1,111	25.38%	1,066	24.35%	2,201	50.27%
1916	3,088	59.74%	1,781	34.46%	300	5.80%
1920	4,938	65.40%	1,985	26.29%	627	8.30%
1924	4,761	49.83%	463	4.85%	4,330	45.32%
1928	5,420	49.59%	5,419	49.58%	91	0.83%
1932	4,386	35.70%	7,363	59.93%	536	4.36%
1936	4,527	32.83%	8,954	64.93%	310	2.25%
1940	6,218	41.18%	8,802	58.29%	81	0.54%
1944	5,213	41.23%	7,375	58.33%	56	0.44%
1948	5,414	42.86%	6,943	54.96%	276	2.18%
1952	7,488	51.79%	6,921	47.87%	49	0.34%
1956	7,766	54.31%	6,489	45.38%	45	0.31%
1960	6,460	44.82%	7,924	54.98%	29	0.20%
1964	4,434	30.56%	10,046	69.25%	27	0.19%
1968	5,829	40.58%	7,821	54.45%	714	4.97%
1972	7,647	48.14%	8,003	50.38%	236	1.49%
1976	7,809	45.85%	9,027	53.00%	197	1.16%
1980	8,146	46.04%	8,475	47.90%	1,071	6.05%
1984	8,952	52.84%	7,934	46.83%	56	0.33%
1988	7,114	44.28%	8,891	55.34%	60	0.37%
1992	6,027	33.55%	8,387	46.69%	3,548	19.75%
1996	5,925	36.69%	8,561	53.01%	1,664	10.30%
2000	8,871	51.23%	7,970	46.03%	475	2.74%
2004	9,680	50.32%	9,381	48.76%	177	0.92%
2008	8,763	45.97%	9,974	52.32%	327	1.72%
2012	9,534	52.59%	8,330	45.95%	266	1.47%
2016	11,121	59.81%	6,436	34.61%	1,037	5.58%
2020	13,207	62.39%	7,606	35.93%	354	1.67%
2024	14,109	64.50%	7,462	34.11%	303	1.39%

United States Senate election results for Delta County, Michigan1
Year	Republican		Democratic		Third party(ies)	
Year	No.	%	No.	%	No.	%
2024	13,601	63.33%	7,316	34.06%	561	2.61%

Michigan Gubernatorial election results for Delta County
Year	Republican		Democratic		Third party(ies)	
Year	No.	%	No.	%	No.	%
2022	10,097	58.23%	6,890	39.73%	354	2.04%

Delta County operates the County jail, maintains rural roads, operates the major local courts, records deeds, mortgages, and vital records, administers public health regulations, and participates with the state in the provision of social services. The county board of commissioners controls the budget and has limited authority to make laws or ordinances. In Michigan, most local government functions – police and fire, building and zoning, tax assessment, street maintenance etc. – are the responsibility of individual cities and townships.

=== Elected officials ===
- Prosecuting Attorney: Lauren Wickman
- Sheriff: Edward Oswald
- County Clerk/Register of Deeds: Nancy Przewrocki
- County Treasurer: Sherry Godfrey
- Drain Commissioner: George Maciejewski
- County Surveyor: Mel Davis
- Circuit Court Judge: John B. Economopoulos
- District Court Judge: Steven C. Parks
- Probate Court Judge: Perry R. Lund

(information as of September 2018)

== Transportation ==
=== Major highways ===
- US 2 runs east–west through the lower part of the county, entering from Schoolcraft County east of Garden Corners and running westward to an intersection with US 41 at Rapid River.
- US 41 runs north–south through central part of the county, entering from Alger County at Trenary, running southerly to Rapid River then southwesterly along the Lake Michigan shore to the southwest corner of county.
- M-35 enters from Marquette County at the northwest corner of the county and runs southeasterly to intersection with US 41 at Gladstone.
- M-69 runs east–west across the southwestern tip of the county, entering from Menominee County at Schaffer and running southeasterly to an intersection with US 41 west of Narenta.
- M-183 runs from the southern tip of the Garden Peninsula at Fayette State Park to an intersection with US 2 at Garden Corners.

=== Airport ===
The county is served by Delta County Airport (KESC), southwest of Escanaba. It provides scheduled airline service to Detroit and Minneapolis.

== See also ==
- List of Michigan State Historic Sites in Delta County
- National Register of Historic Places listings in Delta County, Michigan
