= Iron County MRA =

- U.S. National Register of Historic Places
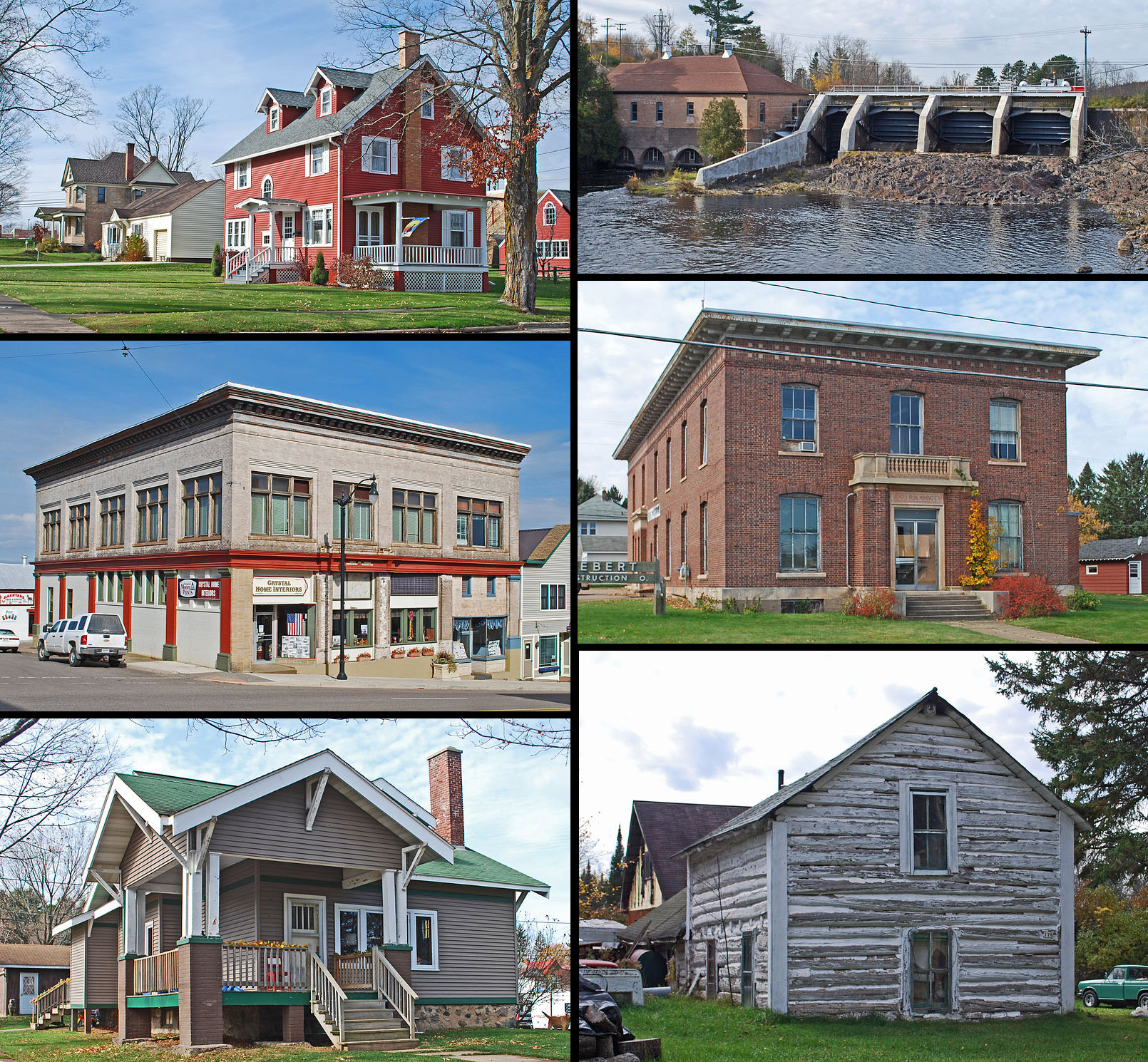
- Clockwise from top left: Courthouse Residential Historic District, Crystal Falls Dam & Powerplant, Munro – M.A. Hanna Mining Company Office Building, Park City Historic District, Harvey Van Wagner House, Finnish and Swedish Mercantile Association Building

- Location within Michigan Location within the United States
- Location: Iron County, Michigan
- Coordinates: 46°6′0″N 88°30′0″W
- MPS: Iron County MRA
- NRHP reference No.: 83003659, 660, 662, 664, 665, 667, 671-676, 678, 680-682, 687, 689, 691, 692, 694, 696, 698, 699, 701, 703, 705, 707, 709, 711, 713, 714, 716-731, 734, 736, 737, 739, 740, 742-744, 746, 748-752, 759, 761, 762, 764, and 766-770; 93001408
- Added to NRHP: December 22 and 29, 1983; August 3, 1994

The Iron County MRA is a Multiple Resource Area addition to the National Register of Historic Places, which includes 72 separate structures and historic districts within Iron County, Michigan, United States of America. These properties were identified and placed on the Register in 1983, with the exception of one property that was placed on the Register in 1993.

== History ==
Iron County, originally part of Marquette County, was first surveyed in 1851. At that time, the area was populated almost exclusively by Native Americans from the Menominee and Ojibwe tribes. Although the original 1851 survey of the county noted the presence of iron ore, European settlers began arriving in numbers in 1875, prospecting for iron ore. In 1880, two important ore strikes were made: the first was by John Armstrong, who opened the Crystal Falls Mine along the Paint River, and the second was by Donald C. MacKinnon, who opened the Iron River (or Riverton) Mine along the Iron River. These two mines were the foundation of the two main population centers of the county, and the success of the mines brought more prospectors to the area, with 70 mines eventually producing ore in the county.

Logging also began in the county in 1875, and lumber mills were soon another important contributor the area's economy. Railroads, particularly the Chicago and North Western Railway, extended lines into the county to service the expanding mines. Lines to both Iron River and Crystal Falls were completed in 1882, and both settlements expanded rapidly.

Separate townships for Iron River and Crystal Falls, still under the auspices of Marquette County, were created in 1882. However, there was much local sentiment for establishing a new county for the area, and in 1885 Iron County was split from Marquette County.

At the time of Iron County's creation, Iron River, then the only incorporated village in the county, was designated the county seat. However, a bitter dispute over the location of county buildings immediately erupted between the geographically disparate east side, centered on Crystal Falls, and the west side, centered on Iron River. The dispute lasted until 1889, when a county-wide general election designated Crystal Falls as the county seat.

By 1890, there were nearly 4500 people living in Iron County, supported primarily by the mining and timber industries. However, the Panic of 1893 caused a depression in iron prices that lead to the closing of nearly all iron mines in the county and a severe curtailing of lumbering activities. County residents turned to agriculture to support themselves. The economy of the area rebounded around the turn of the century as major mining companies, such as the M. A. Hanna Company and Pickands, Mather and Company bought up smaller mines in the area. Logging of hardwoods began in the county around the same time, and a long period of sustained growth stretched until the Great Depression.

The population of the county grew substantially during this time, reaching 20,805 in 1930. A great many of the newcomers were immigrants from Ireland, Italy, Poland, Scandinavia, Scotland, and Wales. New villages were platted, primarily to house mine workers, including Alpha, Mineral Hills, Caspian, and Gaastra. Iron River, Crystal Falls, and Stambaugh were all expanded. To serve the new residents, an electric street car line was installed in 1906, and a number of public schools were built.

The Great Depression ended Iron County's economic boom. Iron mining in the county was completely halted, and lumbering was substantially reduced, leaving thousands of workers unemployed. Several federal government projects were funded in the county, including the Cooks Run Trout Feeding Station (built in 1933–34), the Pentoga Park Office and Bathhouse (built in 1936), and various Civilian Conservation Corps projects crafted by workers at Camp Gibbs (built in 1934).

The mining industry was temporarily revived by World War II, but mining declined steadily in the postwar years, with few mines lasting into the 1960s and the last iron mine in the county closing in 1979. Lumber, however, has remained a substantial economic enterprise in the area, employing thousands of people until the present day.

== County description ==
According to the U.S. Census Bureau, the county has a total area of 1,211 square miles (3,140 km^{2}), of which 1,166 square miles (3,020 km^{2}) is land and 45 square miles (120 km^{2}) (3.7%) is water. The terrain is generally hilly, with multiple moraines and small lakes, which overlay the iron ore deposits of the Menominee range. There are eight main population centers in Iron County, five on the west side of the county and three on the east. The west-side communities are Iron River, Stambaugh, Caspian, Gaastra, and Mineral Hills. These communities are all relatively closely located along the Iron River, and indeed both Stambaugh and Mineral Hills were merged into Iron River in 2000. The east side communities are Crystal Falls, the county seat; Alpha, six miles away; and Amasa, sixteen miles away. All of these save Amasa are strung out along US Highway 2, and both Stambaugh and Mineral Hills were merged into Iron River in 2000. Iron County also contains several small "Junctions," such as Beechwood, and mining locations, such as Mansfield, that consist of a handful of residences grouped together. The remainder of the county is primarily forested wilderness, with the western third of the county forming part of the Ottawa National Forest.

== MRA methodology ==
In the 1970s, a number of historic surveys and initiatives were undertaken in Iron County and the surrounding region. These included the 1972 Historic Site Inventory of Michigan's Western Upper Peninsula by Philip E. Metzger, a 1974-74 region-wide survey of historic properties by the Western Upper Peninsula Planning and Development Region, the 1977 inventory of historic Upper Peninsula engineering and industrial by Charles K. Hyde (as part of the Historic American Engineering Record), and a comprehensive list of sites compiled by the Iron County Historical and Museum Society. In 1977, the Iron County Courthouse was placed on the National Register of Historic Places, the first such designation in the county (and only one previous to this MRA). This was followed by several other structures in the county being listed in the Michigan State Register of Historic Sites.

Late in 1977, a collaboration between the Iron County government and the Iron County Historical and Museum Society was begun for the purpose of nominating a Multiple Resource Area to the National Register. The previous surveys were combined as a basis for the MRA, and the sites were field surveyed in 1979/80. Historical research was performed over the next two years, and extensive revision took place in 1982/83.

== Crystal Falls ==
In 1866, claims were filed on property along the Paint River where Crystal Falls now stands. However, no attempt was made to establish a permanent settlement until 1880, when Dr. D. M. Bond and Donald C. MacKinnon of Iron River opened the Paint River Mine. Nearly simultaneously, S. D. Hollister Sr. and George Runkel of nearby Florence, Wisconsin opened the Crystal Falls Mine. A sawmill was immediately opened, and other mines opened in the area, and by 1881, enough iron ore had been discovered that the Chicago and North Western Railway decided to extend their line from Florence to Crystal Falls.

The line was completed in 1882, and Crystal Falls grew tremendously, going from four commercial structures in 1882, to twenty-five by 1884. Schools were established in 1882, and Crystal Falls was incorporated as a village in 1889, the same year it became the county seat. By 1890 the population was 3,231, and there were 27 saloons in the village. In 1891, the village constructed its own hydroelectric plant. The village became a city in 1899, and continued to expand, with new streetlights, sewers, and government buildings constructed in the first part of the 20th century. The growth halted with the onset of the Great Depression and shutdown of the mining industry, only briefly reviving after World War II.

There are seventeen structures and districts from Crystal Falls in this MRA. They are summarized below. One additional structure in Crystal Falls, the Iron County Courthouse, was placed on the NRHP separate from this MRA and is not included in the list below.

=== Frank W. Cole House ===
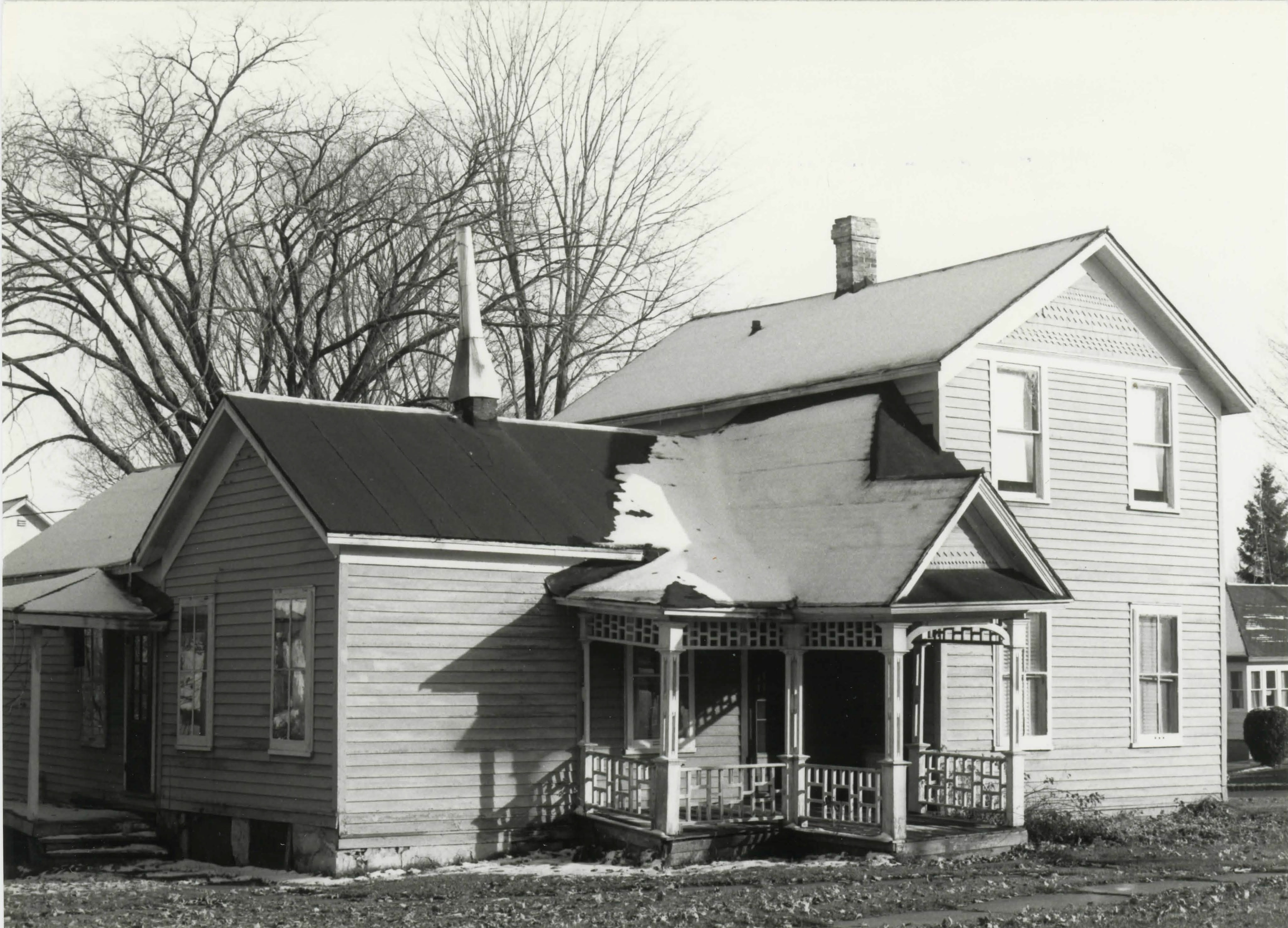

46.095°N 88.330833°W

The Frank W. Cole House was an L-shaped frame house located at 121 Third Street. It was constructed circa 1899 for druggist Frank W. Cole. It had a simple, unpretentious, two-story design covered with clapboard; one gable end was covered with multi-patterned wooden shingles. In contrast, the open front porch featured unusual pierced square columns and an intricate frieze and porch railing.

This house is missing and presumed demolished.

=== Courthouse Residential Historic District ===
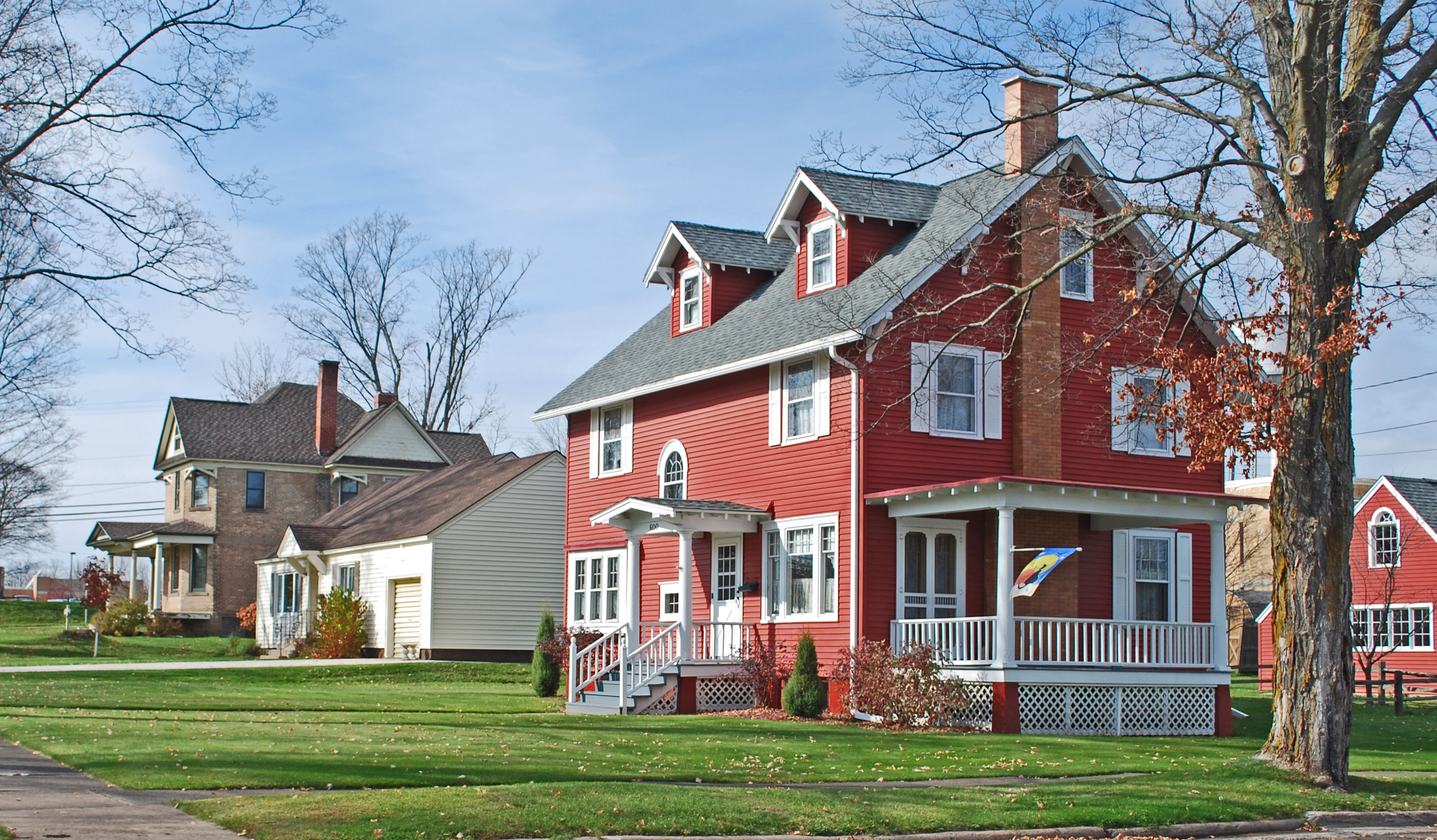

46.096111°N 88.336667°W

The Courthouse Residential Historic District is a residential neighborhood roughly bounded by Crystal Avenue, Michigan Avenue, Iron Street, and 5th Street. It includes the Iron County Courthouse and most of the finest houses in Crystal Falls, built primarily at the peak of the mining and lumbering industries for mining officials, lumbermen, and other businessmen and professionals of Crystal City. The houses include Queen Anne, Colonial Revival American Craftsman/bungalow, and American Foursquare structures, as well as a Gothic Revival church, three school buildings, and the Queen Anne sheriff's residence and Art Deco jail near the courthouse.

=== Crystal Falls Dam and Power Plant ===
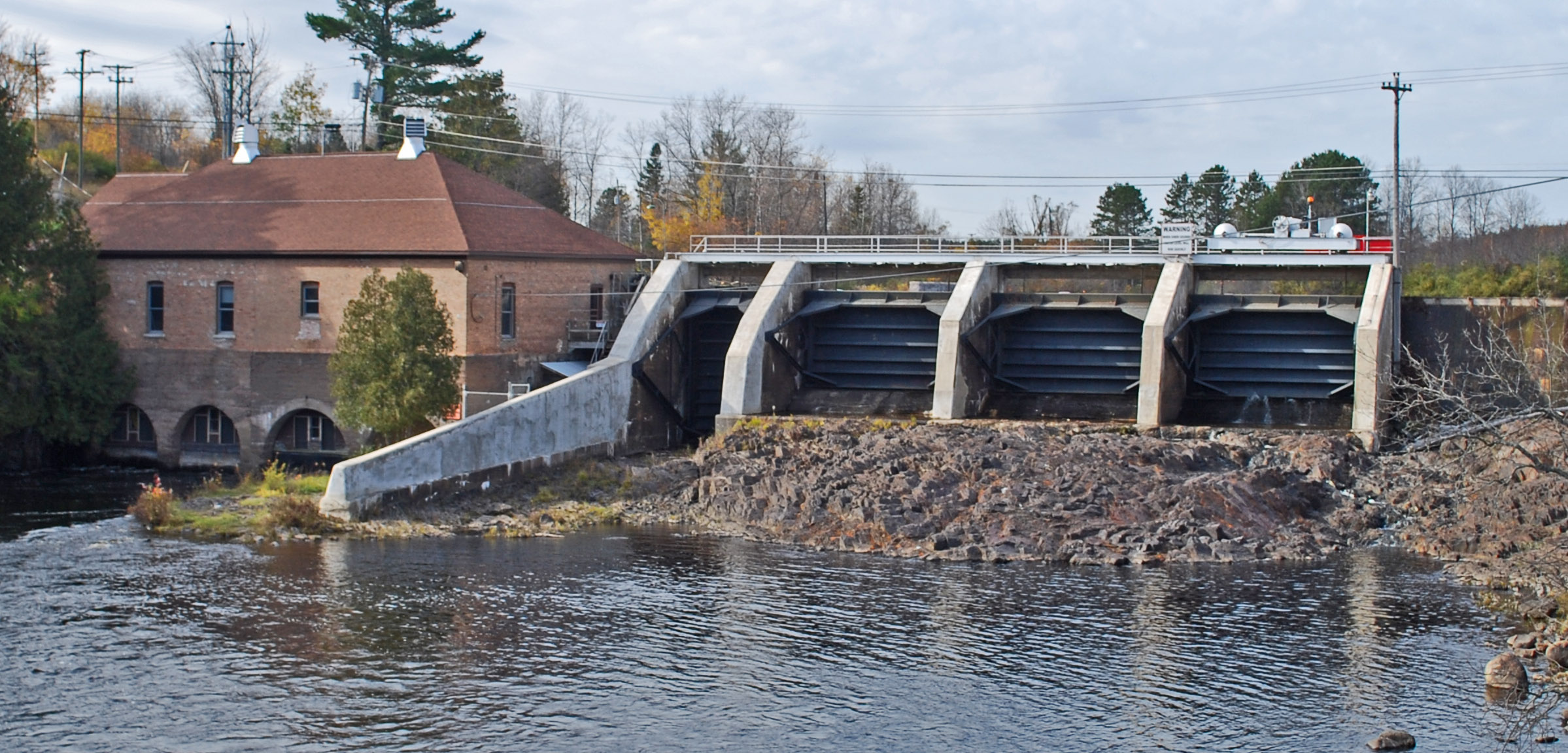

46.106111°N 88.334722°W

The Crystal Falls Dam and Power Plant is a utility located on the Paint River off Powerplant Road. The section of the Paint River where the dam is now located was once a series of falls and rapids that gave Crystal Falls its name. In 1891, the village of Crystal Falls constructed the Crystal Falls dam and power plant, effectively submerging the rapids. In 1902–1903, a new power plant was constructed. The plant was expanded in 1907, and new generators were installed in 1914 and 1924. The plant was expanded several times, including a 1931 installation of a new concrete dam installed containing the rollway and tainter gates and a 1996 resurfacing of the spillway. The Crystal Falls Power Plant is still operational, and is likely the oldest hydro-electric plant still in operation in the Upper Peninsula. It provides roughly 1/3 of the power demanded by the residents of Crystal Falls.

The Crystal Falls Power Plant is a two-story structure measuring approximately thirty feet by sixty feet with a hipped roof. The power plant is constructed of yellow brick with sandstone trim and sits on a concrete foundation. The adjacent concrete dam spanning the Paint River measures approximately seventy-five feet long and fifteen feet high, and has four spillway sections.

=== Crystal Inn ===
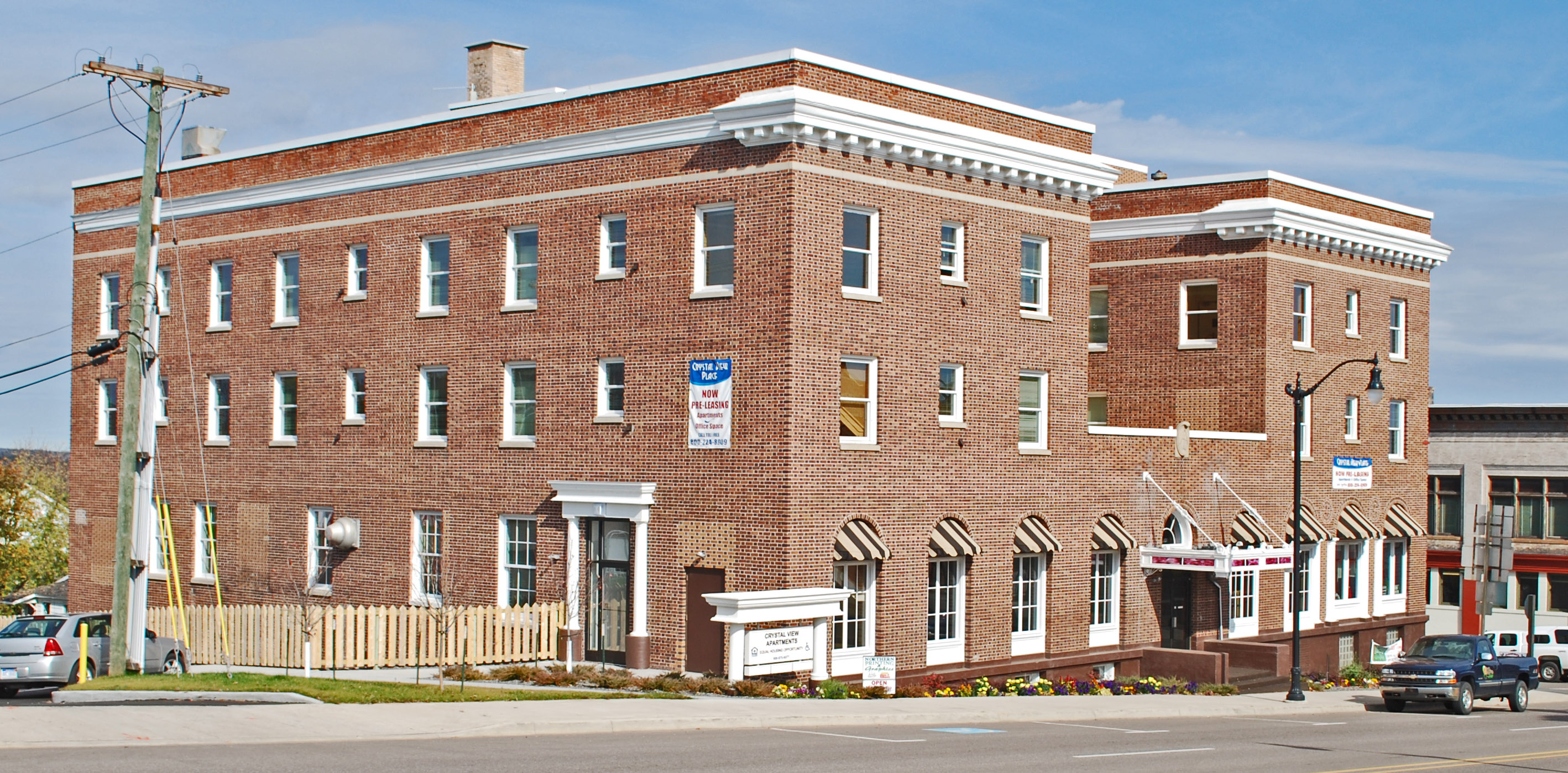

46.096944°N 88.333056°W

The Crystal Inn, also known as Crystal Manor or the Crystal View Apartments, is a residential building located at 400 Superior Avenue. The site where the Crystal Inn now stands was originally Crystal Falls' first hotel, the 1882 Lockwood Hotel. The Lockwood was destroyed by fire in 1918, and the Crystal Falls Hotel Company, backed by the American Legion purchased the property with the intention of constructing a new hotel. The present structure was completed in 1922. It was operated as a hotel until 1963, when the Lutheran Hospitals and Homes Society of America, Inc. remodeled it as a home for the aged, known as the Crystal Manor. The Crystal Manor closed in 1998, and the building remained vacant. In 2010, the building was renovated into a 25-unit apartment with commercial space, known as the Crystal View Apartments, by Crystal View Development Co. LLC. The complex opened in November 2010.

The Crystal Inn is a three-story, Georgian Revival structure sheathed in bichrome brick accented with sandstone window sills and belt courses. It is built in a U-shape, with balanced massing and fenestration; the hotel has a wooden cornice, and an arcade-like first floor with Tuscan columns and a stained glass frieze near the entrance. The main floor contains a kitchen/pantry, dining room, offices, a large lounge area, and a sitting room/sun porch. There are 27 rooms on each of the second and third floors, and additional rooms in the attic that once housed employees of the Inn.

=== Ernest Diele House ===
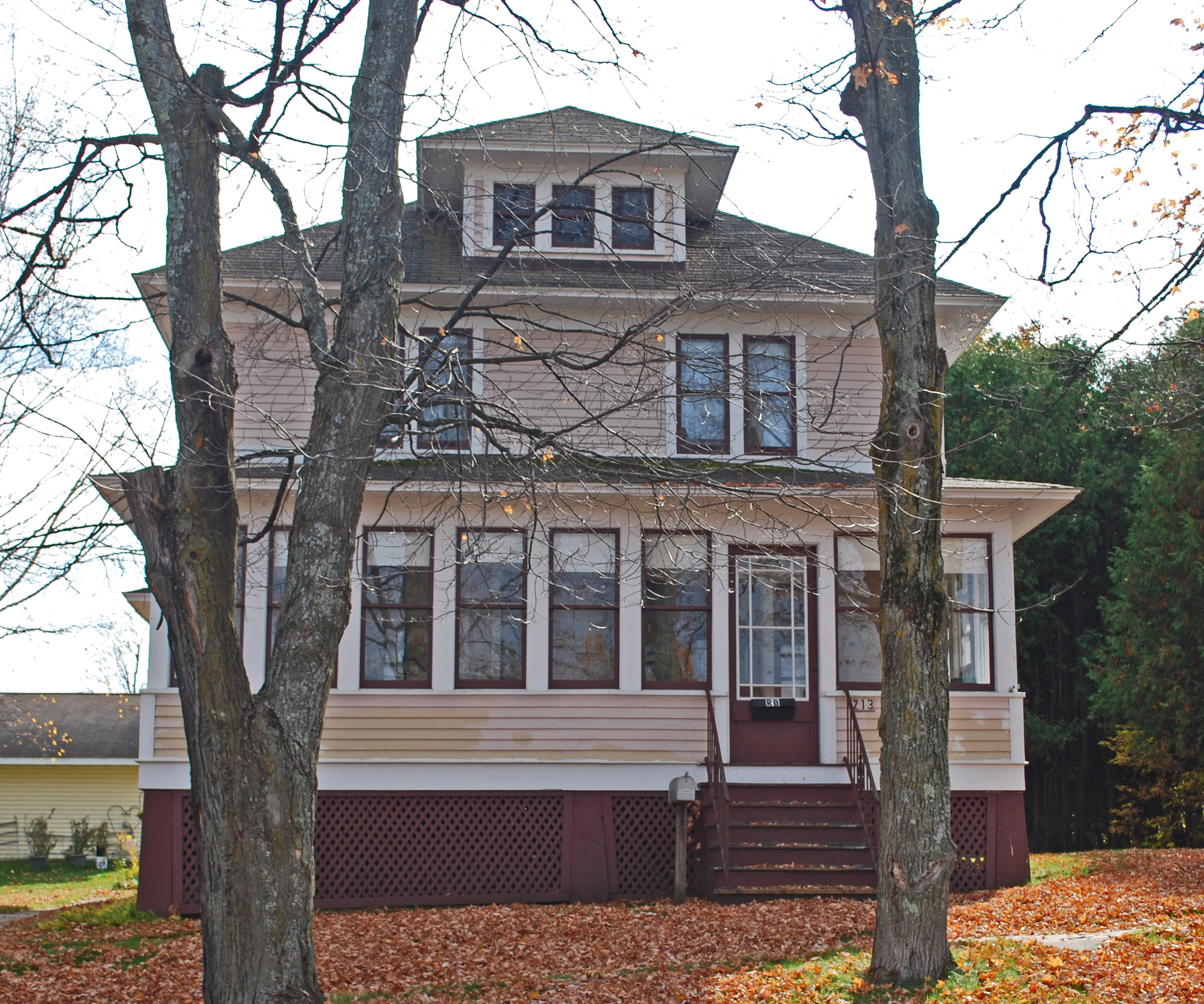

46.095556°N 88.330556°W

The Ernest Diele House is a two-story American foursquare house located at 213 Marquette Avenue. It was built for Ernest Diele, the head mason of the Corrigan-McInney Mining Company. The rectangular, two-story, hipped roof, frame structure is set in an ample, tree-shaded lot. The simple, clapboarded house with hip-roof dormers and a glassed-in front porch is typical of the plain but substantial houses which managers and skilled tradesmen working in the local mining industry lived in.

=== Falls Location Historic District ===
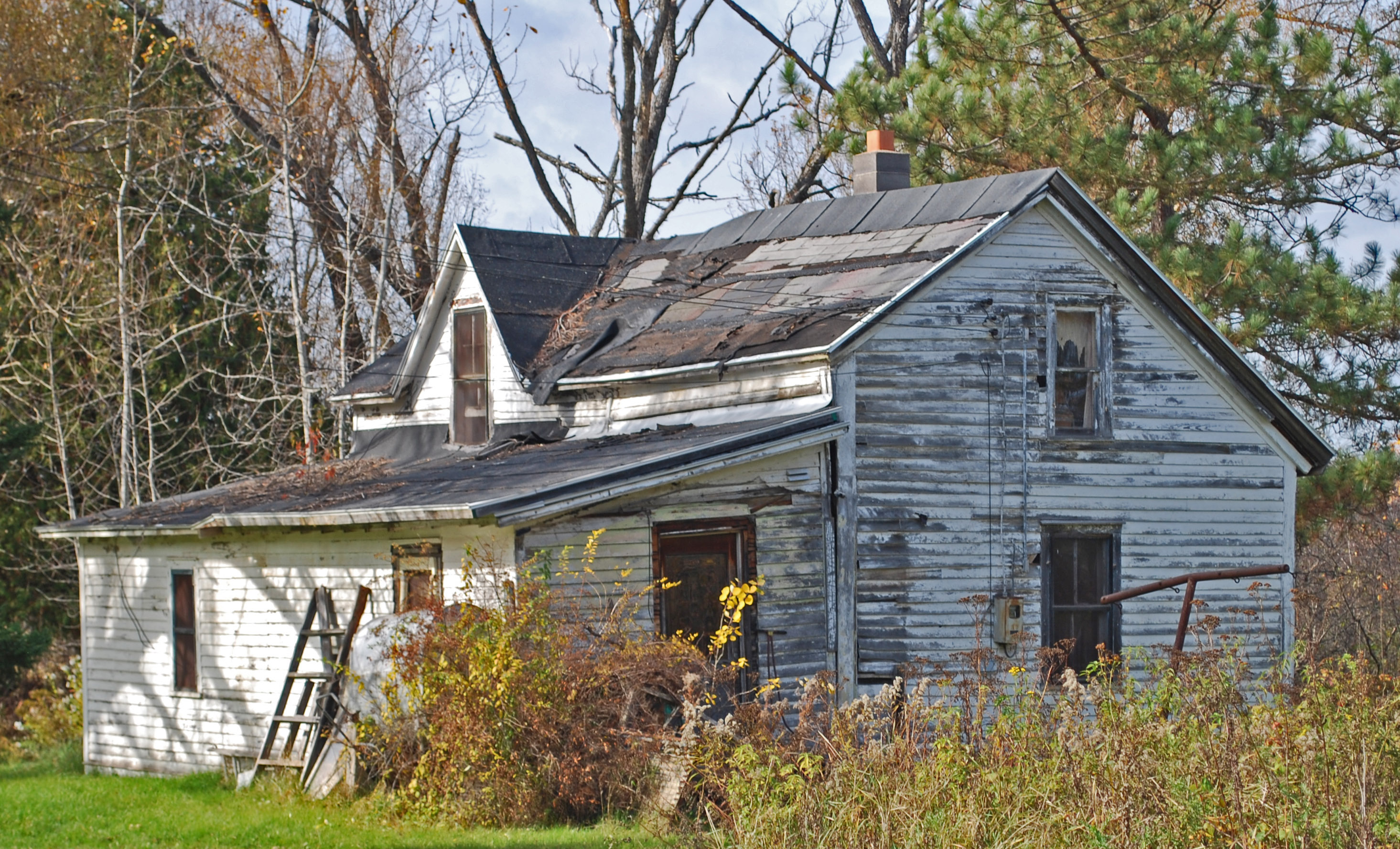

46.1075°N 88.338889°W

The Falls Location Historic District is collection of seven log houses and associated outbuildings, located at the Paint River near downtown Crystal Falls. The settlement developed between 1880 and 1900, likely in part due to the opening of the nearby Crystal Falls Mine. All of the houses in the Falls Location are built from logs, and were originally single- or two-room structures of one or 1½ stories. Several have been enlarged, and three were clapboarded at an early time. Two others have modern siding. The outbuildings are all of frame construction except for one log shed. In spite of these cosmetic changes, the Falls Location Historic District is significant as a cohesive late 19th-century settlement of log dwellings, one of only three left in Iron County.

=== Finnish and Swedish Mercantile Association Building ===
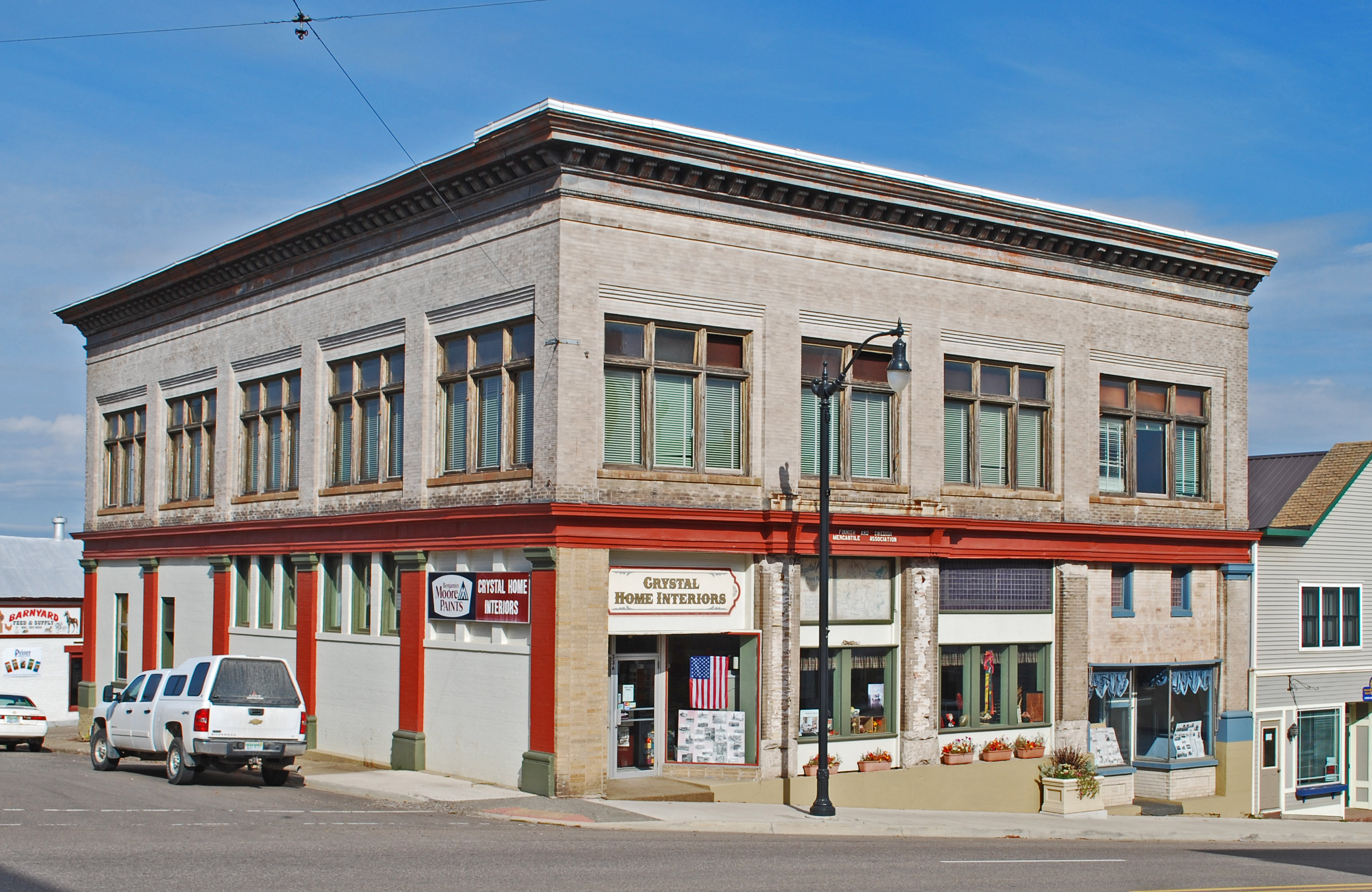

46.096944°N 88.332222°W

The Finnish and Swedish Mercantile Association Building is a commercial block located at 336 Superior Avenue. It was built in 1908 for a co-operative grocery and department store collectively owned by local Finns and Swedes of the Mercantile Association. It is significant as a historical reminder of the large Scandinavian population of Crystal Falls in the early 20th century. The first floor of the building still houses a grocery store and there are offices on the second floor.

The Finnish and Swedish Mercantile Association Building is built of brick with a classical galvanized iron cornice and a simpler galvanized iron storefront cornice over the first floor. The first-floor facade has been reconstructed.

=== H. W. Harte Block – Crystal Falls Village Hall ===
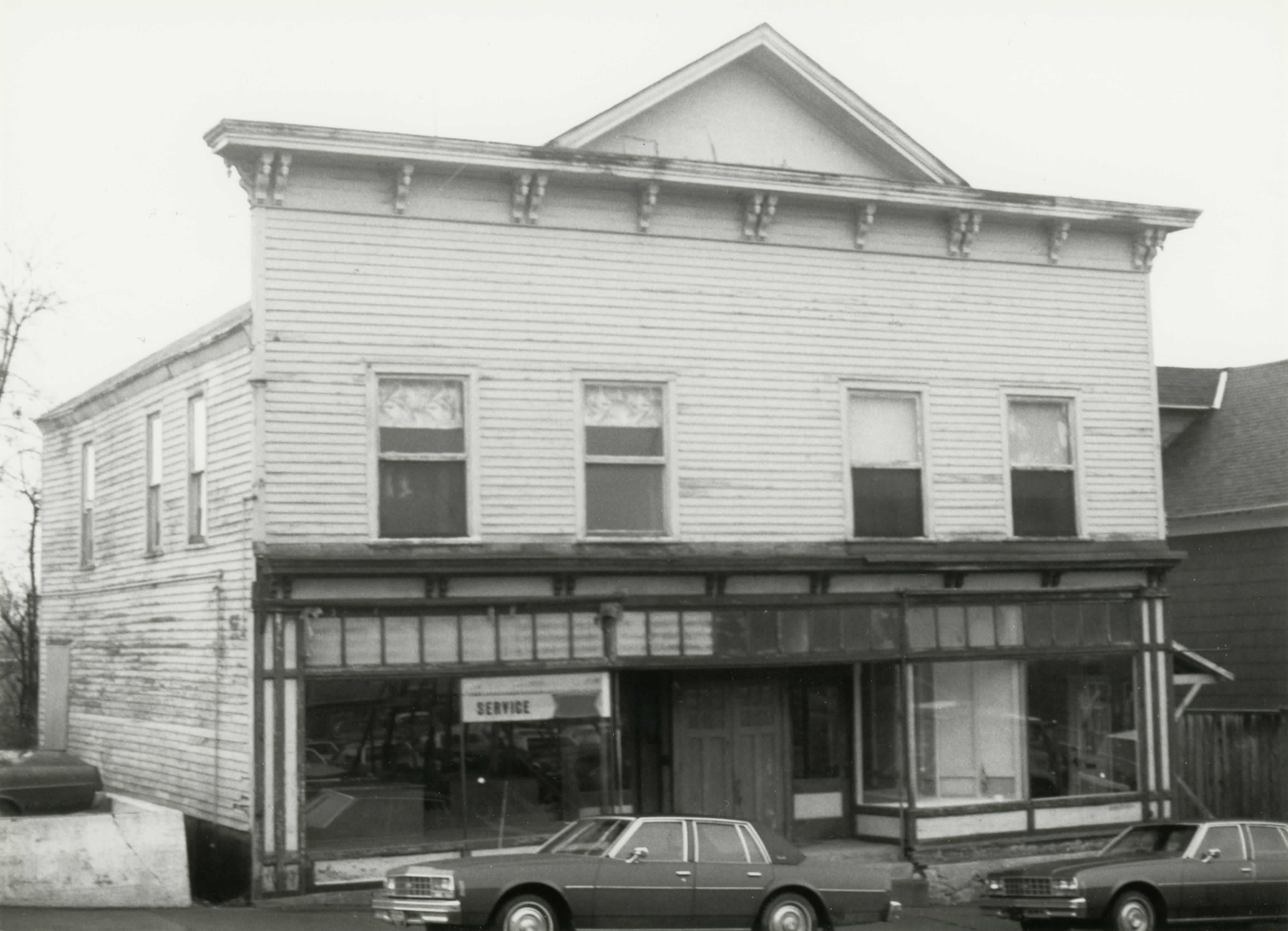

46.096944°N 88.333611°W

The Henry W. Harte Block, also known as the Crystal Falls Village Hall, was a two-story frame commercial building located at 414-418 Superior Avenue. The building was constructed around 1890 for Henry W. Harte, a prominent Crystal Falls lumberman. It was moved in 1895, at which time the Crystal Falls village offices took up residence in the building. The village offices remained in the building until 1913, when Joseph Bendick bought the building from the city and moved it across the street. Bendick modernized the facade of the building at the same time; the building remained in the Bendick family until at least the early 1980s.

The Harte Block was a two-story frame commercial structure with a gable roof and clapboard siding. The facade was symmetrical with a corniced false front concealing the gable end. The first-floor storefront had a recessed entrance, above which were a series of small-paned transom windows running the length of the facade and a bracketed cornice.

This building is missing and presumed demolished.

=== John Hasselstrom House ===
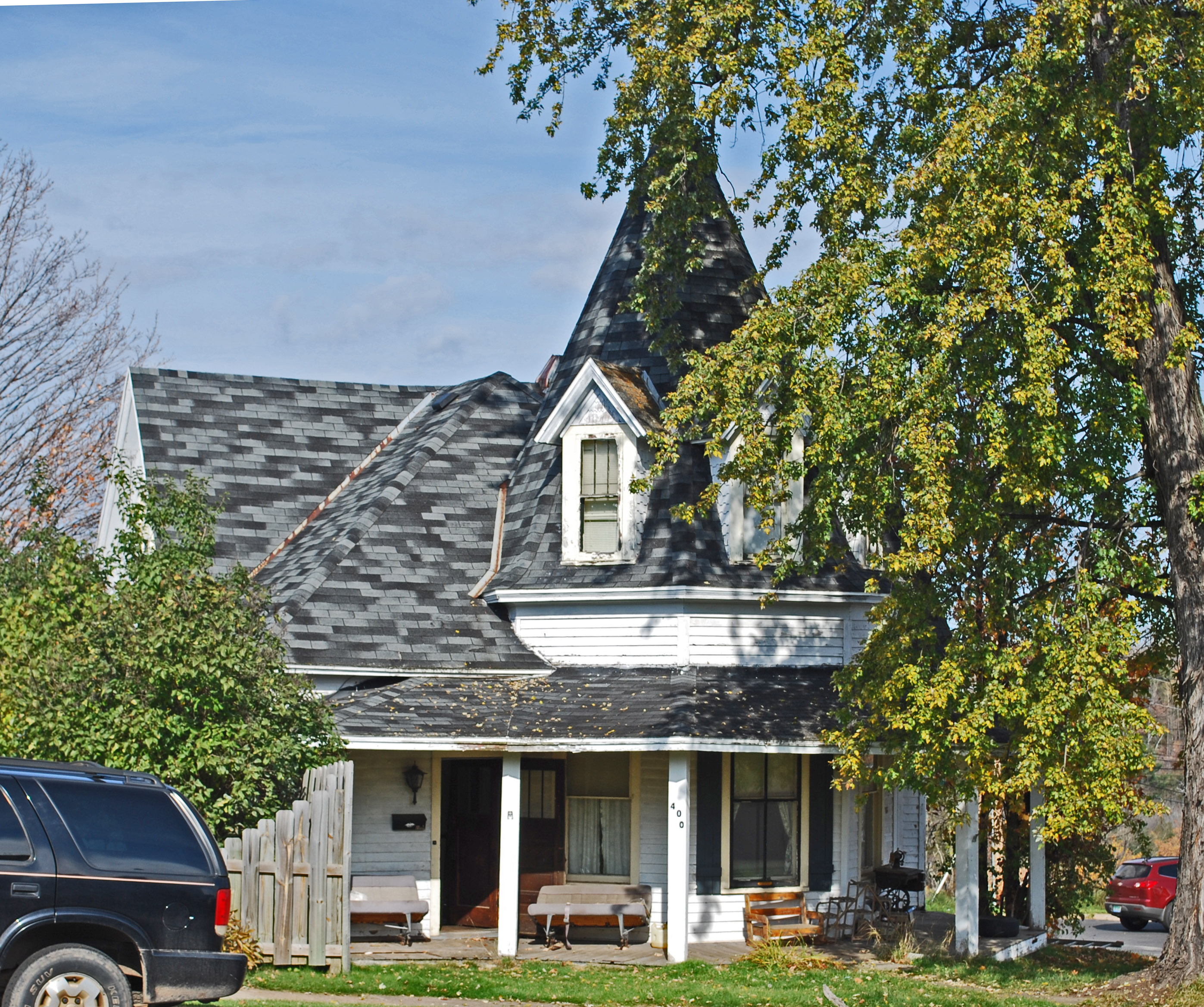

No longer extant.

46.097778°N 88.332778°W

The John Hasselstrom House is a 1 1/2-story frame house located at 400 Crystal Avenue. It was built by John Hasselstrom, a local carpenter and woodcutter, for his own use in 1898. It also served as the home and office of Dr. Harry Larson in the 1930s, and was re-roofed and remodeled in the 1960s. It is an unusual vernacular interpretation of the Queen Anne style, having a prominent octagonal turret with a steep roof, and three shingled dormers, along with a large open wraparound porch.

=== Frank C. Huse House ===
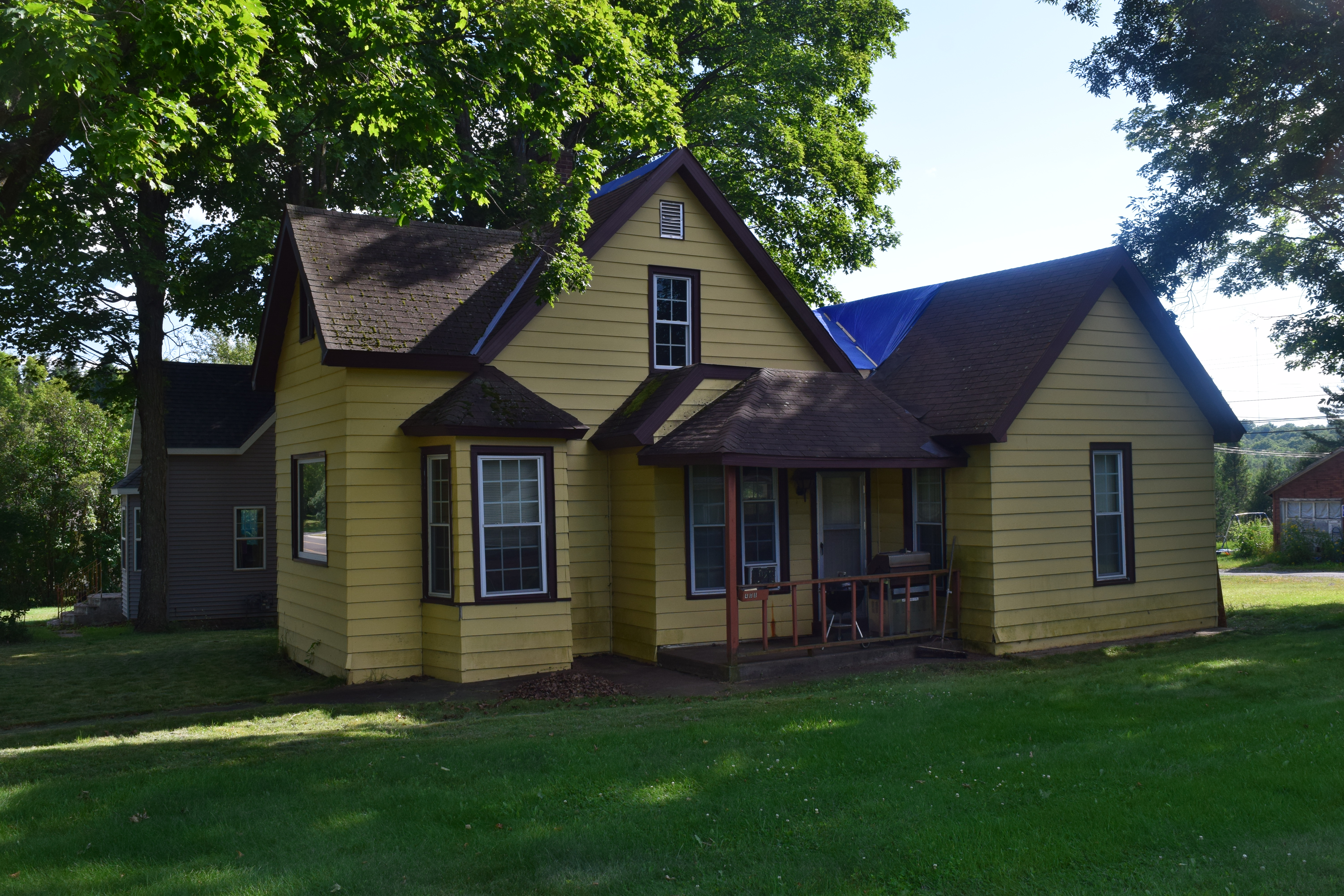

46.091944°N 88.334167°W

The Frank C. Huse House is a 1 1/2-story late Victorian house located at 408 Fifth Street. It was presumably constructed for Frank C. Huse, the local agent for the Chicago and North Western Railway and for the American Express Company. The house faintly resembles a small-town depot, and is clad with tongue-and-groove siding and pierced bargeboards on the gable ends. The house has a small bay window and front porch with turned posts.

=== Timothy Murphy House (Harbour House) ===
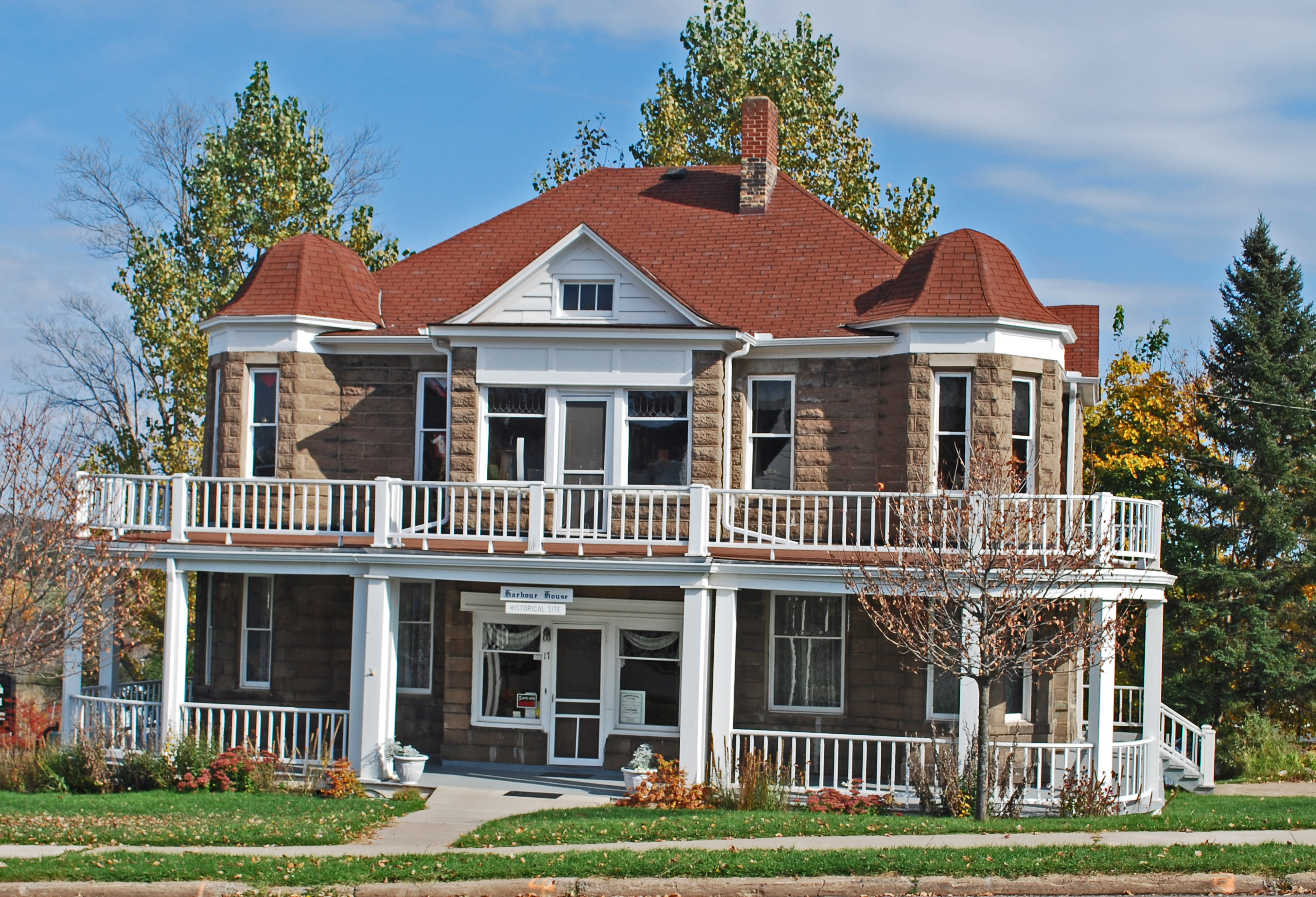

46.0975°N 88.3325°W

The Timothy Murphy House, also known as the Harbour House, is a concrete block house located at 17 North Fourth Street. The house was built in about 1900 by Fred Floodstrand, a local master mason and bricklayer, for Michael Moriarty, Iron County Prosecuting Attorney. John and Ellen Harbour, for whom the house is now named, soon moved in. Their daughter Maude (or Minnie) later married Timothy Murphy, the Stambaugh railroad depot superintendent, and the couple moved into the house and raised their three children there. A number of other families lived in the home, and in 1982 it was purchased for the Crystal Falls Museum Society for $10,000. The house was extensively restored, currently serves as a hands-on museum for the society.

The house is a massive two-story hipped roof Queen Anne/Colonial Revival structure built from rough-faced cement blocks. The house is symmetrical, with matching corner turrets having bellcast roofs on each side. A two-story gable-roofed bay projects from the center, and a two-story, wooden, wraparound porch that contrasts nicely with the mass of the house and gives the house the look of a steamboat.

=== John H. Parks Company – Wills Hardware Building ===
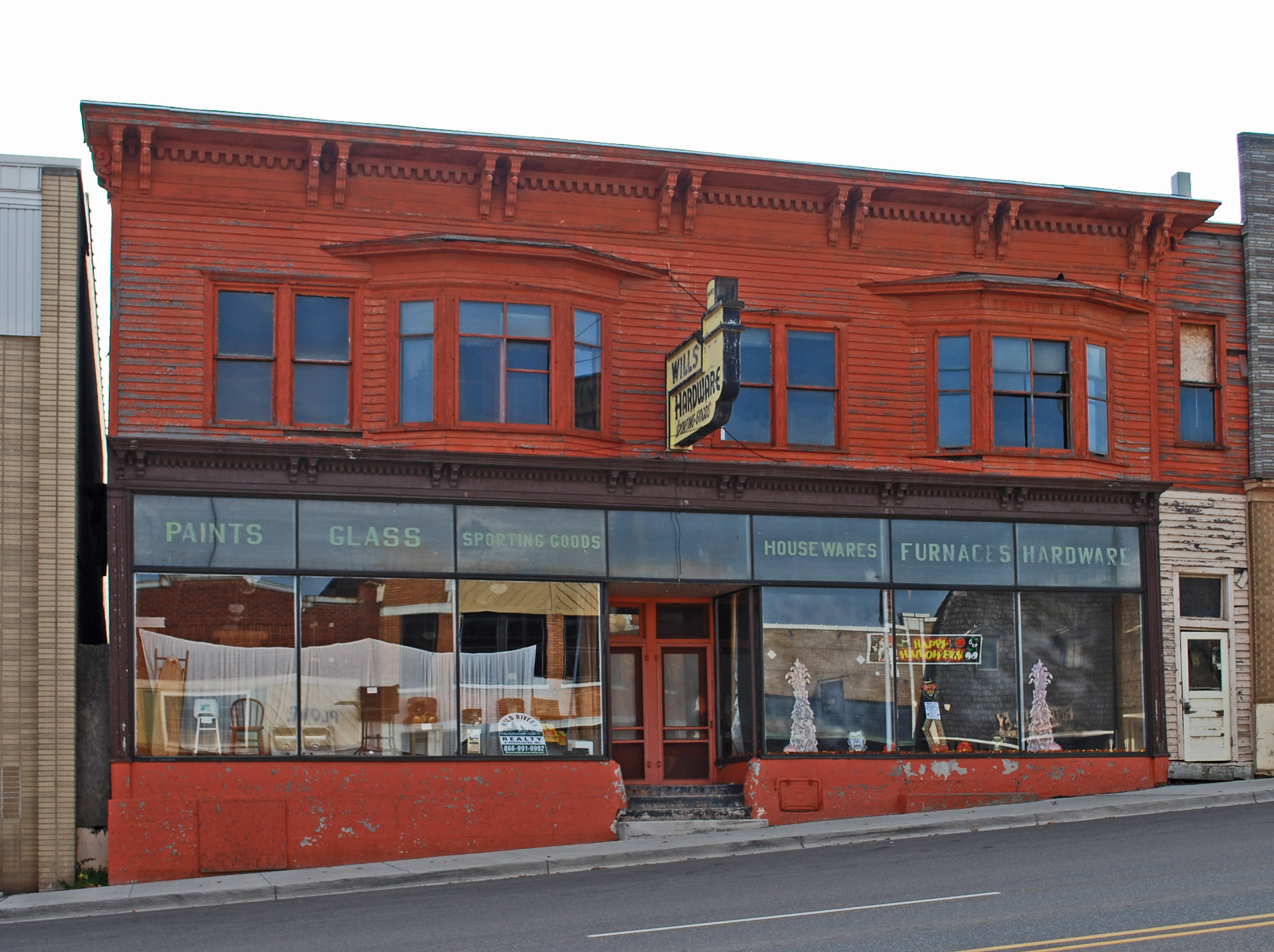

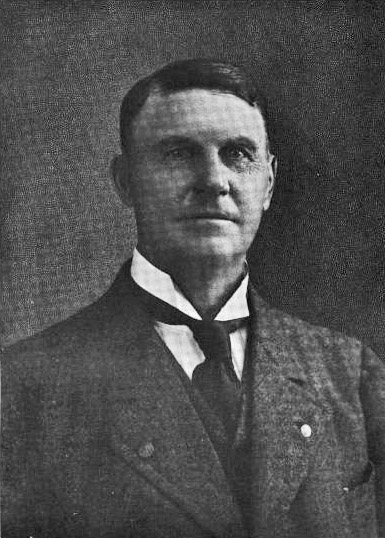
John H. Parks

46.096667°N 88.331667°W

The John H. Parks Company – Wills Hardware Building is a commercial building located at 319 Superior Avenue. The building was constructed in approximately 1890 for the John H. Parks Company Department Store. John H. and his uncle, George S. Parks, opened the department store in 1884 to complement their lumber business. John H. Parks served as president of the village board and was the first mayor of Crystal Falls. Parks later turned his business into a hardware store. In 1915, Tom Wills purchased the building for his hardware store. The building is a two-story frame Late Victorian commercial block, clad with clapboard with a pair of bay windows on the second floor. A heavy cornice runs along the top of the building and second, smaller cornice runs above the first-floor storefront. The building is significant as one of the best preserved of the few remaining late 19th-century commercial structures in Crystal Falls.

=== Herman Rau House ===
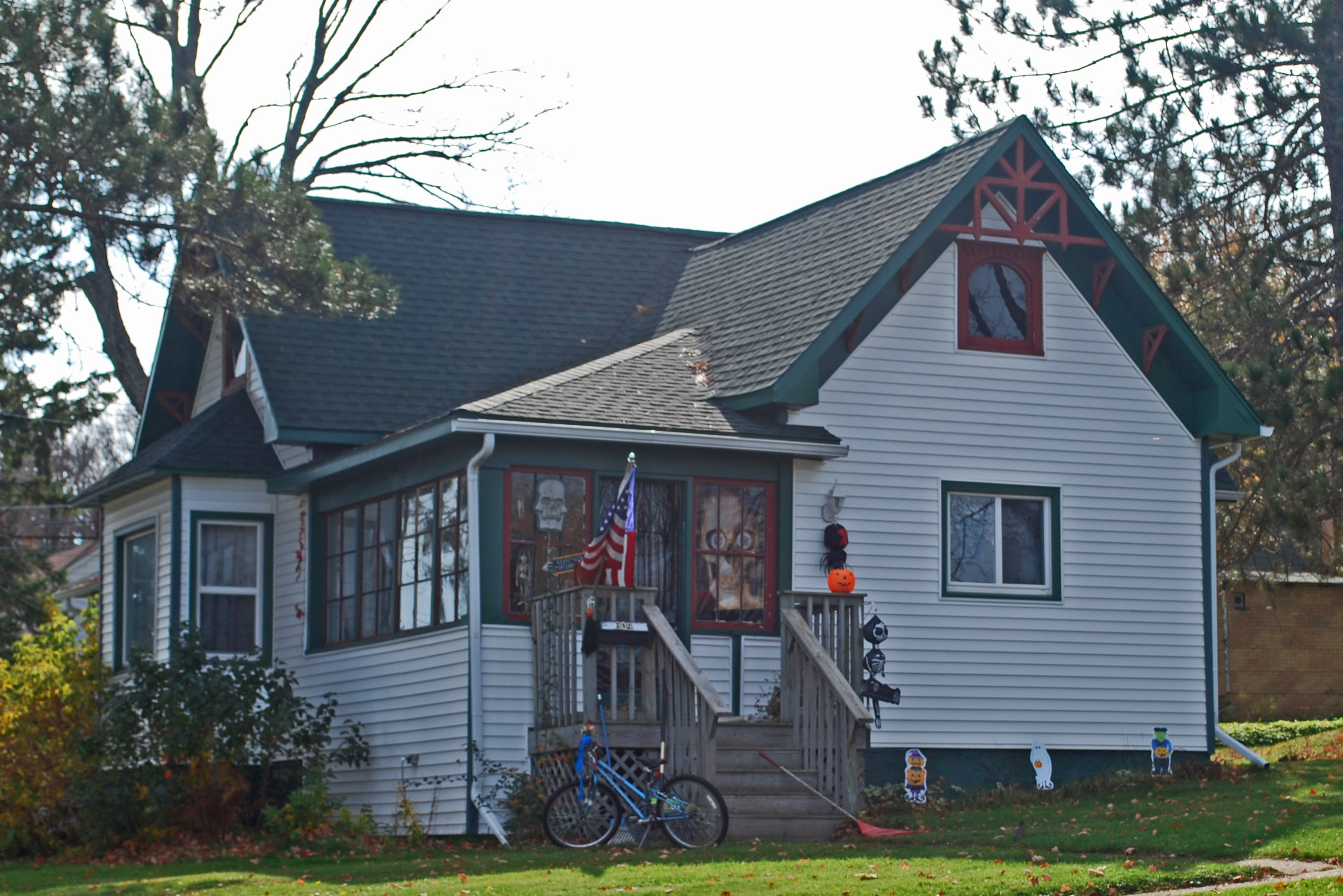

46.095556°N 88.331944°W

The Herman Rau House is a 1 1/2-story frame house located at 309 Marquette Avenue. The house was built in about 1890 for Herman Rau, the owner of a local grocery and meat market. The house is notable for its well-preserved Late Victorian detailing. The house is L-shaped with a gable roof and broadly overhanging eaves. The entire house including an early 20th-century enclosed porch, is sided with narrow clapboards. The gable ends are paneled with flush boards and contain round-head windows.

=== David M. Ross House ===
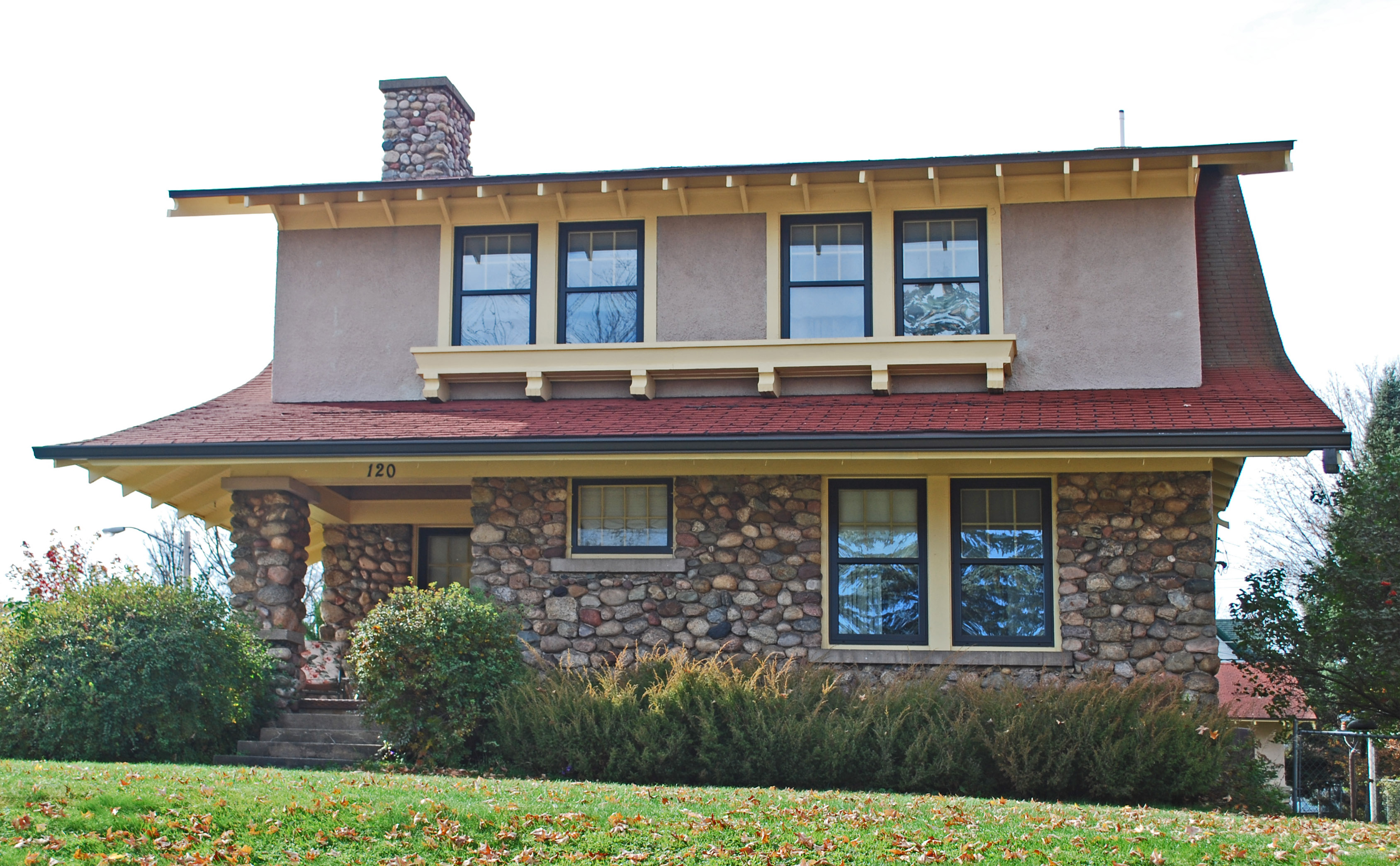

46.095°N 88.332778°W

The David M. Ross House is a stone house located at 120 South Fourth Street. The house was built for David M. Ross, owner of the D.M. Ross and Company grocery store, and is one of the best examples of bungalow style in Iron County. The house is a two-story flank-gable structure with large front and rear shed dormers. The first story is built from cobblestones and the second story is finished with stucco with stylized half-timbering in the gables. The rafter ends remain exposed below the roofline. Both end walls have projecting shed-roof bay windows. The garage matches the style and construction of the house.

=== Steven Royce House ===
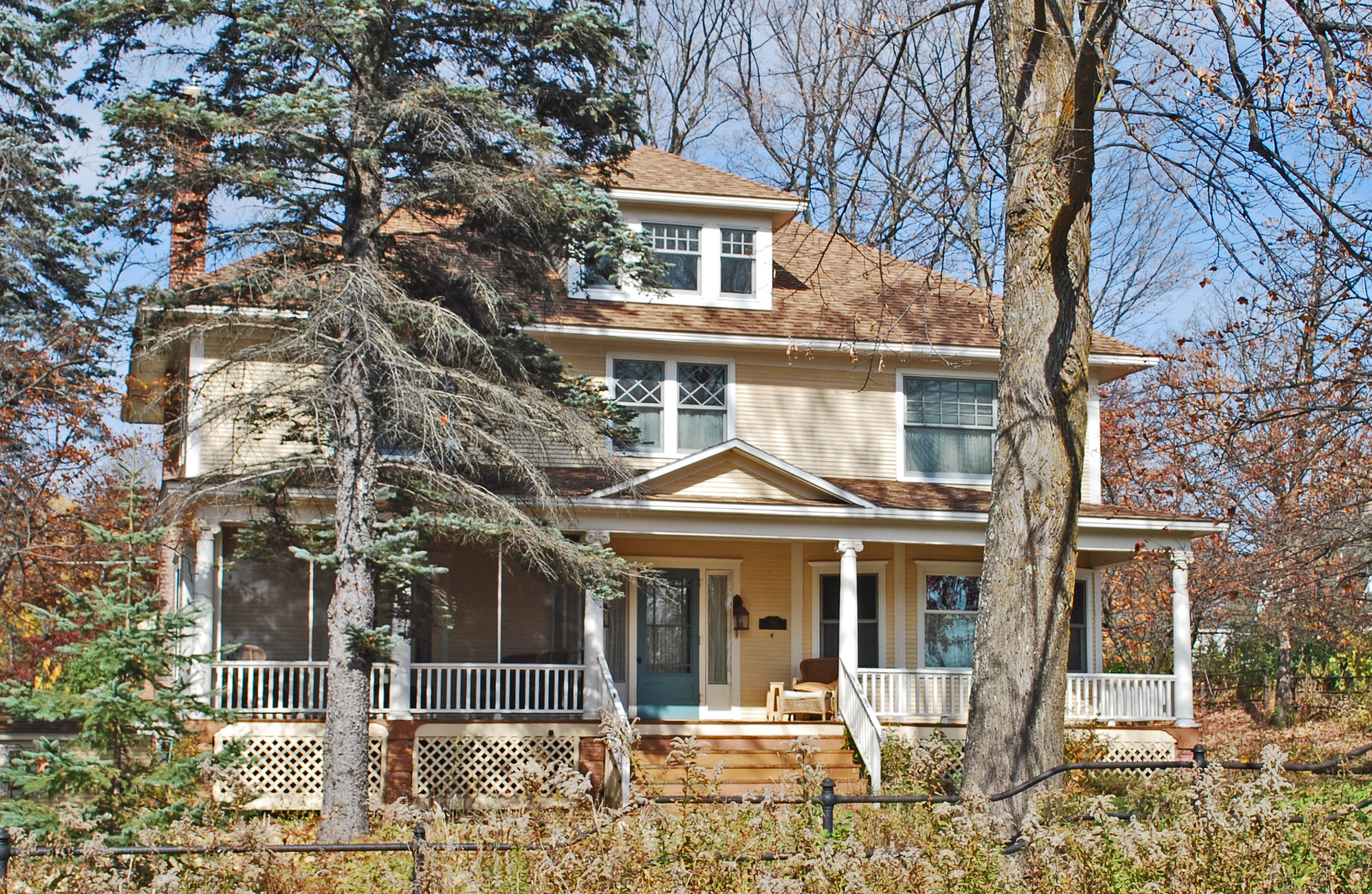

46.096944°N 88.341667°W

The Steven Royce House is a frame house located at 920 Forest Parkway. The house was built by the mining firm of Corrigan, McKinney & Company, one of the local iron-mining firms, as a residence for their professional and managerial personnel. Steven Royce, a geologist with Corrigan, McKinney, was an early occupant of the house. The house is a two-story hipped roof Colonial Revival structure covered with clapboard. Wooden full-width porches extend across both front and back. The roof has hipped, triple-light dormers. The garage echoes the style of the house.

=== William Russell House ===
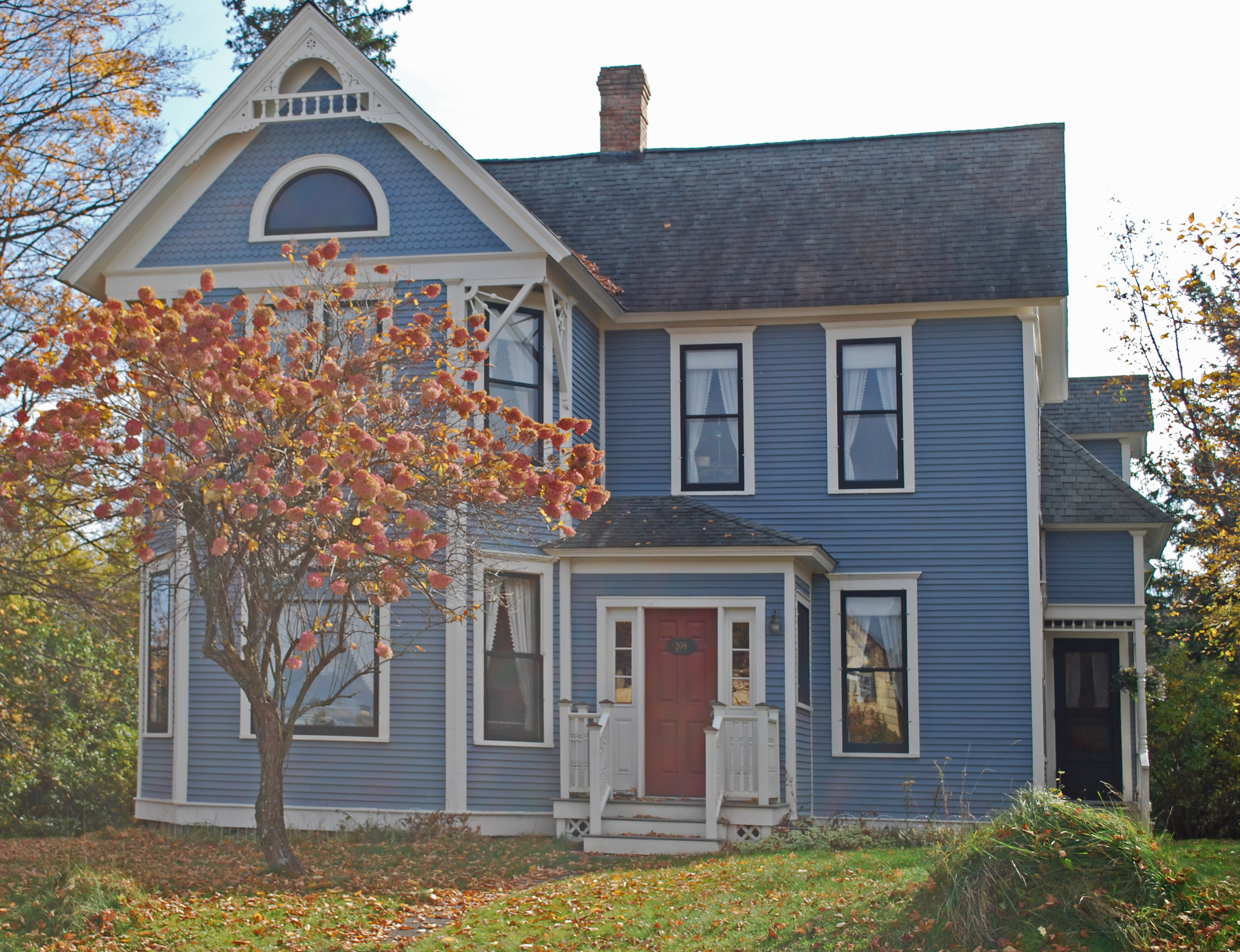

46.094444°N 88.33°W

The William Russell House is a two-story frame house located at 209 Michigan Avenue. The house was constructed in 1888 for William Russell, an early Crystal Falls businessman who owned a saloon and horse stable and worked as a contractor. Russell served as the Crystal Falls township supervisor and on the Iron County courthouse site selection committee. The house remained in the Russell family until it was purchased by the county's first controller, David K. Stewart. The house was meticulously restored in the 1980s.

The Russell House is one of the finest Queen Anne houses in Iron County. It is a two-story frame structure with cross-gable roof and narrow clapboard siding. The gable ends are covered with wooden shingles and contain arched lunettes. Brackets with sunray-pattern turned spindles support one cantilevered gable. Several of the transom windows contain stained glass. The side yard once held an ornate gazebo.

=== John Soderman Farmhouse ===
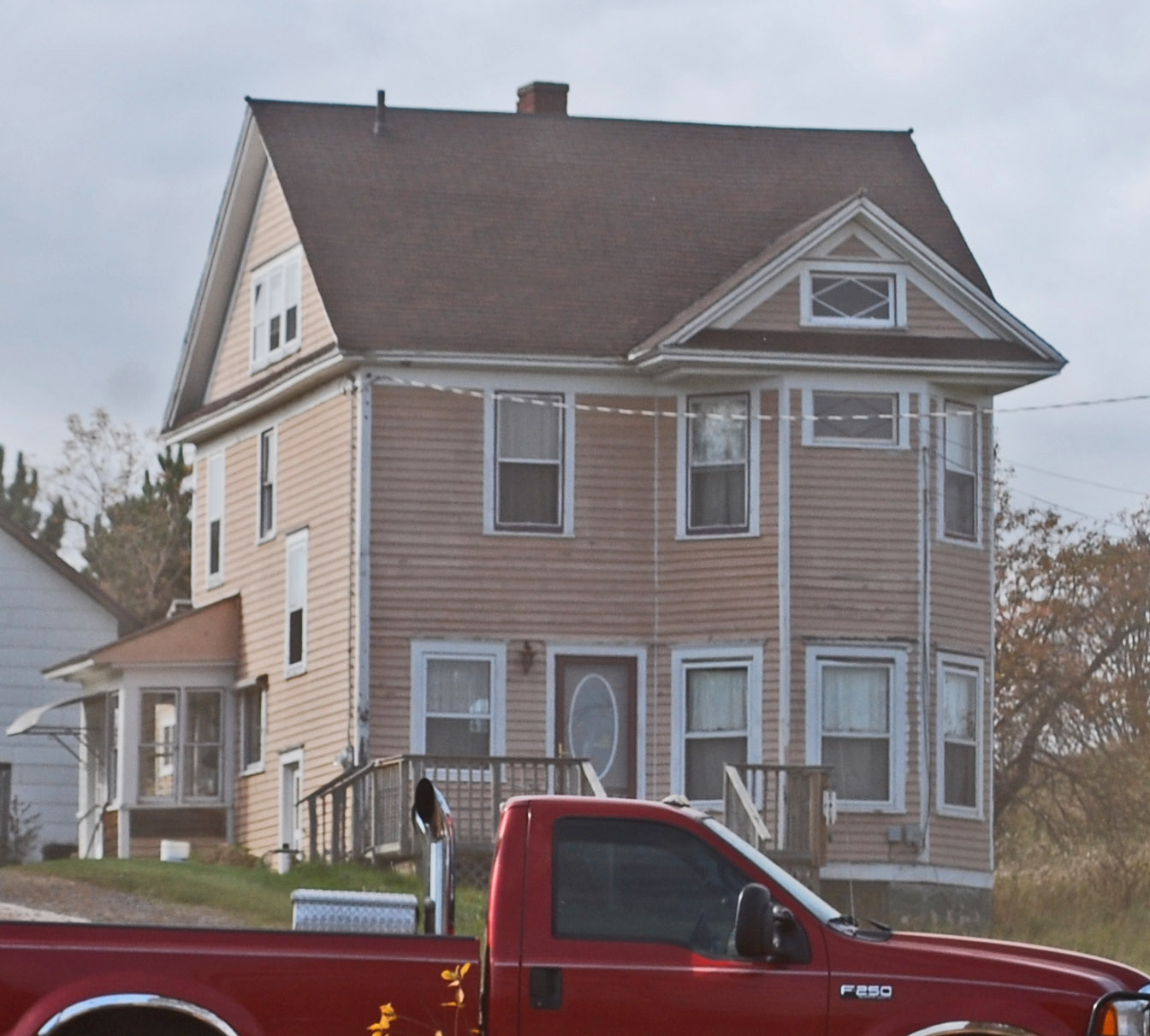

46.104444°N 88.336667°W

The John Soderman Farmhouse is a frame house located on North Sixth Street. The house was originally owned by John Soderman, a successful dairy and potato farmer. Soderman was one of the few full-time farmers in Iron County. The forty-acre farm is still owned by the Soderman family. The farmhouse is a two-story gabled structure with clapboard siding and a two-story bay window. A small garage stands behind the house.

== Iron River ==
In 1880, R. L. Selden and his son William H. Selden began exploration for iron ore along the Maple River. They found enough ore that, at the end of the year, they opened the Iron River Mine (later renamed the Riverton Mine) on the east bank of the river. William Selden quickly convinced the Chicago and North Western Railway run a line from nearby Stager to the area, and at the same time the brothers Donald C. and Alexander MacKinnon platted a village on the west bank of the Maple (now the Iron) River which became the settlement of Iron River.

The railroad line to Iron River was completed in 1882, and settlers quickly flooded the area. The MacKinnon brothers built a sawmill, and a number of houses and stores were built, including a hotel and grocery, and churches were organized. Iron River was incorporated as a village in 1885, by which time over 1000 people lived in the settlement. and the village continued to grow. However, the Panic of 1893 decimated the local iron industry, and no ore at all was mined on the west side of Iron County from 1889 to 1900. Logging and agriculture took over as the primary economic activities around Iron River (although there was a foray into manufacturing by the Buckeye Stave Company), and the city remains the center of agricultural development in the county.

After the turn of the century, iron mining again took center stage in Iron River, with ten new mines opening in the area between 1905 and 1912. More people moved to Iron River, and the village installed sewer and electric facilities. In 1913, a street railway connected Iron River to the nearby mining towns of Mineral Hills, Stambaugh, Caspian, and Gaastra. Iron River was incorporated as a city in 1926, but like the rest of Iron County suffered from the Great Depression. After a brief uptick in mining activity during and after World War II, the city returned to its small town character. In 2000, Iron River merged with nearby Stambaugh and Mineral Hills to form a larger city.

The city still contains many buildings from the boom times of 1900–1920. There are 24 structures and historic districts on this MRA within the pre-2000 boundaries of Iron River. They are summarized below. Two additional structures in Iron River, the Chicago, Milwaukee and Saint Paul Railway Iron River Depot and Central School, were placed on the NRHP separate from this MRA and is not included in the list below, although Central School was included in the original nomination form. There are fourteen more structures now within the boundaries of Iron River which are located in what were once the separate municipalities of Stambaugh and Mineral Hills; these are covered separately.

=== Isaac W. Byers House ===
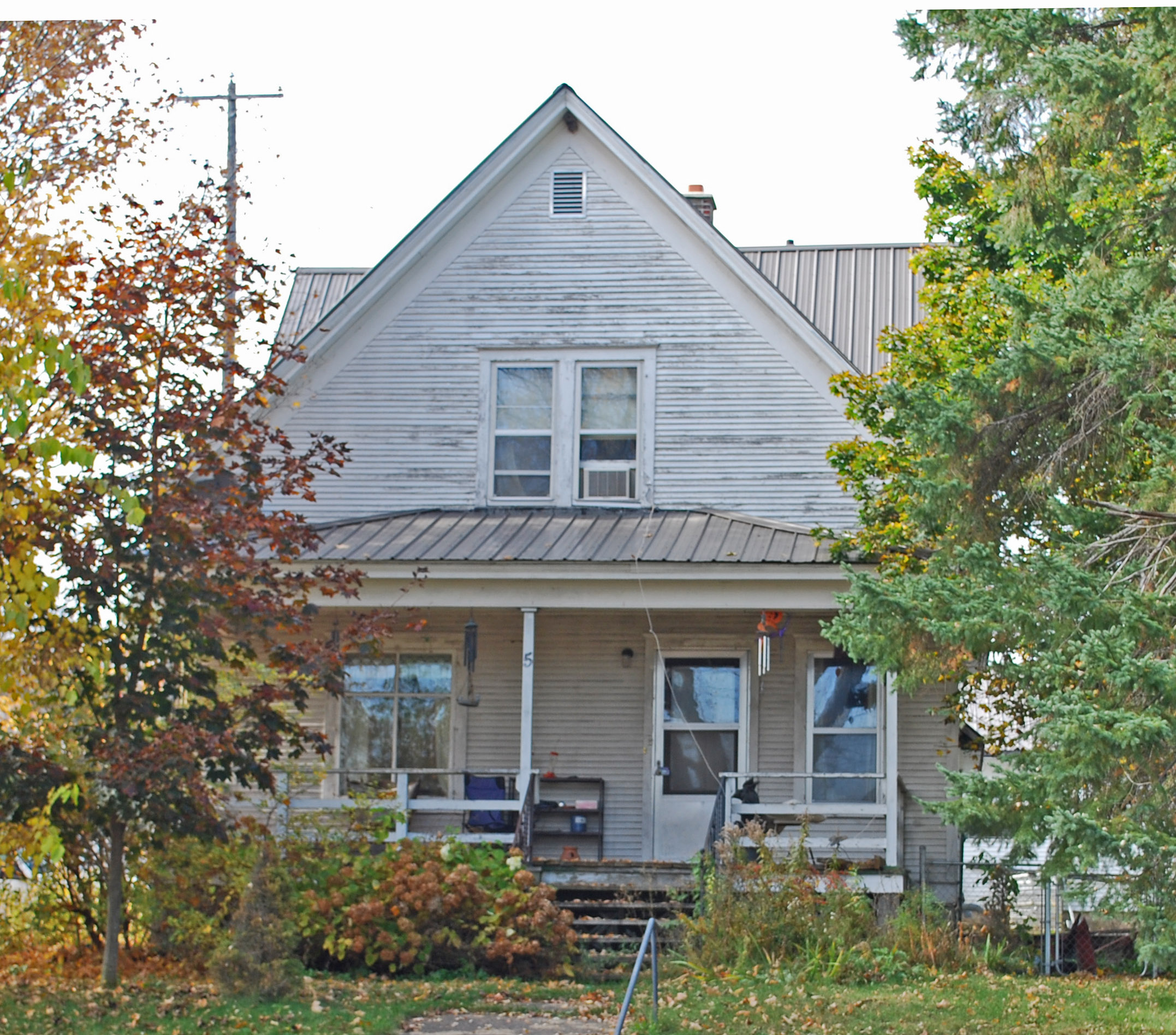

46.087778°N 88.647222°W

The Isaac W. Byers House is a 1 1/2-story frame house located at 5 North Eighth Avenue. It was constructed in approximately 1919 for Isaac W. Byers, a lawyer and one of the leading developers of the Iron River area. Byers and four associates, known as the "Big Five," founded the Iron Savings and Loan Association in 1905, and financed major portions of the development of Stambaugh, Iron River, and Caspian. Byers also served as circuit court commissioner, prosecuting attorney, judge of the probate court, and county school examiner in the area.

The house is built in Queen Anne style, with a steeply pitched roof, bay window, gable returns and narrow clapboard siding. Byers lived in the house for 16 years.

=== Cloverland Hotel ===
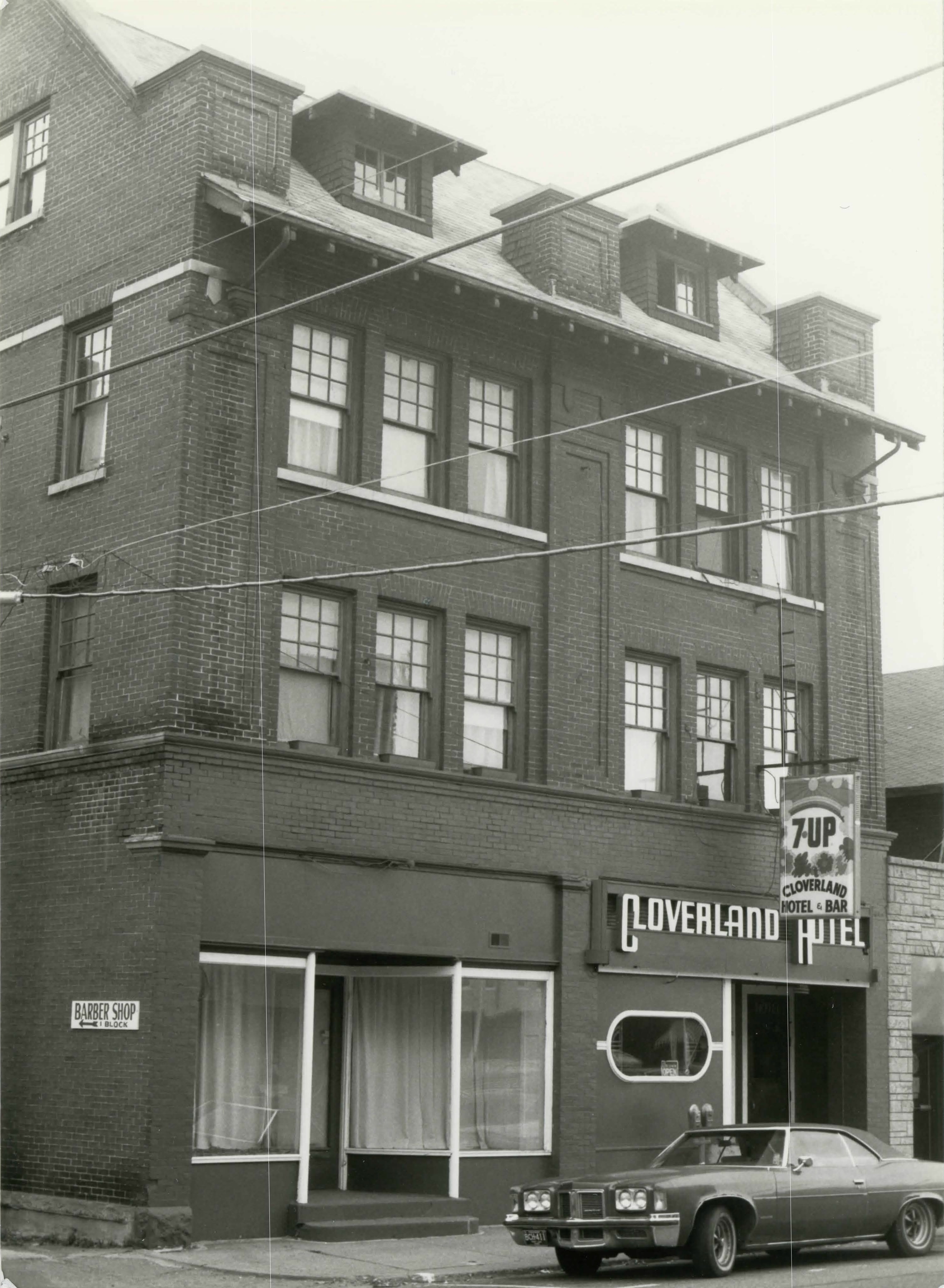

46.0925°N 88.641667°W

The Cloverland Hotel was located at 423 Third Street. It opened in about 1922, with Henry Oberdorfer as the original proprietor. The building was closed for a number of years, and was finally demolished in 2008. The building was slated for removal from the state register in 2023–2024.

The Cloverland Hotel was a 3 1/2-story brick structure, built to resemble an old English pub. The front facade had a flank-gable roof and shingled attic dormers. Brick pilasters intersected the overhanging eaves. Inside, the right-hand storefront contained the Art Moderne Cloverland Bar.

=== Rudolf Ericson House ===
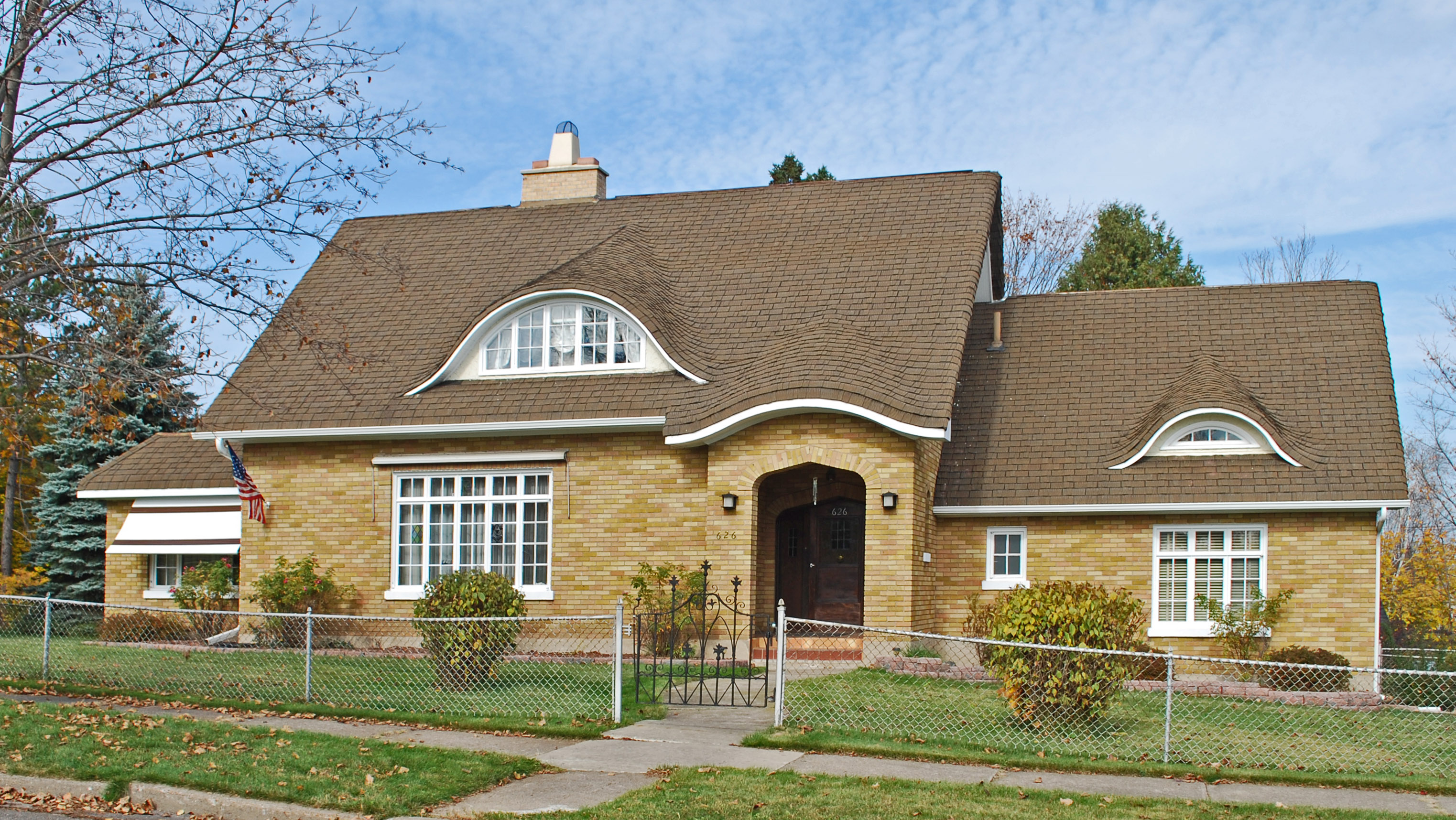

46.09°N 88.646389°W

The Rudolf Ericson House is a small, 1 1/2-story house located at 626 W. Boyington Street. The house was built in 1937 for Rudolf Ericson, the general superintendent of the Davidson Ore Mining Company properties in Mineral Hills. Ericson was widely respected for his experience as an underground engineer, and was frequently consultanted by other mining companies in the Upper Peninsula. Ericson was also instrumental in organizing the village of Mineral Hills, and served as its first president from 1919 until 1935. He also served as president of the Iron County Taxpayers Association, helped organize the Stambaugh General Hospital, and helped found the Miners' State Bank.

The Rudolf Ericson House is rectangular with a wing at each end. It is distinctive in its embrace of the "English cottage style," rare in Iron County. The house is sheathed in glazed brick, and has a Tudor arch doorway, stuccoed gable ends with exposed timbering, and a faux thatch roof of cedar shingles and large, eyelid dormers.

=== Nelson E. Fisher House – High Banks ===
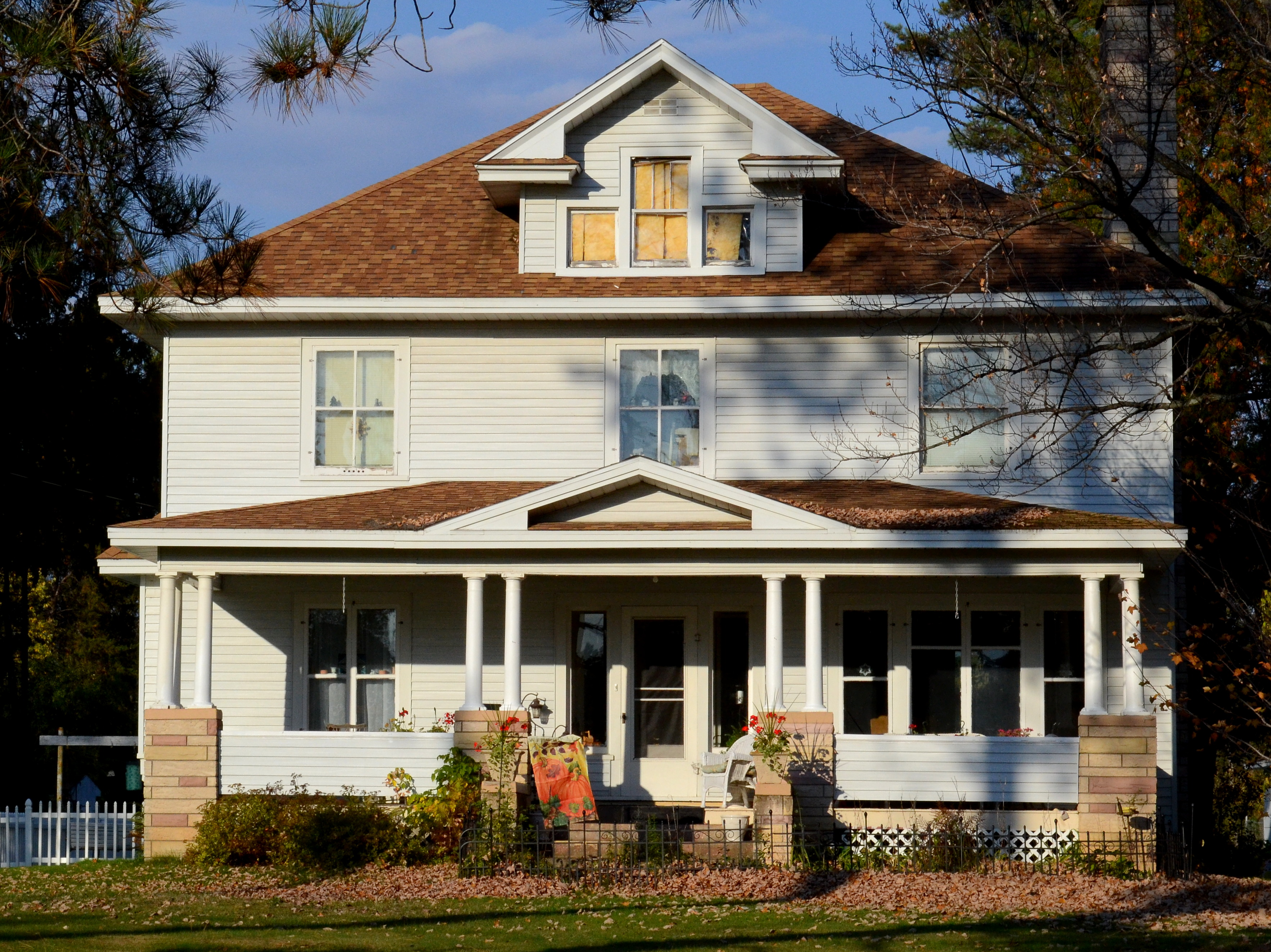

46.0975°N 88.674722°W

The Nelson E. Fisher House, also known as "High Banks," is a house located at 4064 US 2. The house was built in 1912 for Nelson A. Fisher, a leading Iron River businessman and one of the "Big Five." Iron River's Big Five together organized the Iron Savings and Loan Association in 1905, the Iron River Realty Company, the Iron Range Light and Power Company, and platted the Village of Caspian in 1907. Fisher's daughter Aileen Fisher moved with her family to High Banks in 1912 at the age of six. Aileen Fisher later became a notable children's author, and her childhood memories of High Banks are reflected in her writing.

The Fisher House is a two-story frame Colonial Revival structure with a hipped roof and clapboard siding. The attic corners have gable returns, and a porch supported by wooden Tuscan colonnettes runs the full width of the front facade. Behind the house is a small single-story servants' quarters with clapboard siding and a cobblestone chimney.

=== Henry H. Frailing House ===
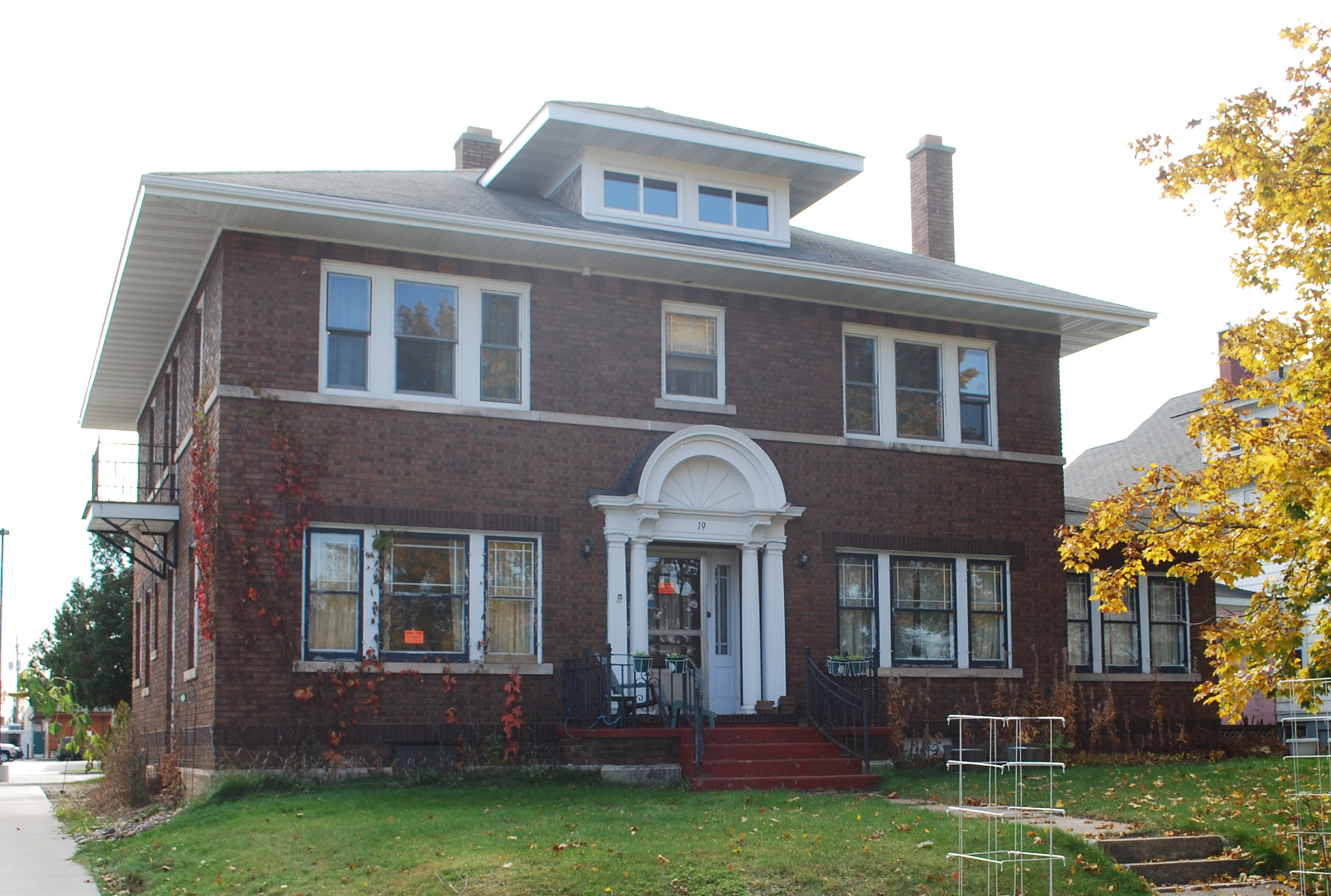

46.093333°N 88.638333°W

The Henry H. Frailing House is an Italianate house located at 19 W. Cayuga Street. It was built in approximately 1916 for Henry H. Frailing, owner of the Iron River Creamery. It is a symmetrical hipped roof house built of brick with sandstone window ledges and a sandstone beltcourse. The round arched frontispiece supported by a recessed porch of Tuscan columns. It is significant as one of the few Italian-influenced structures in Iron County.

=== Dennis J. Haggerty House ===
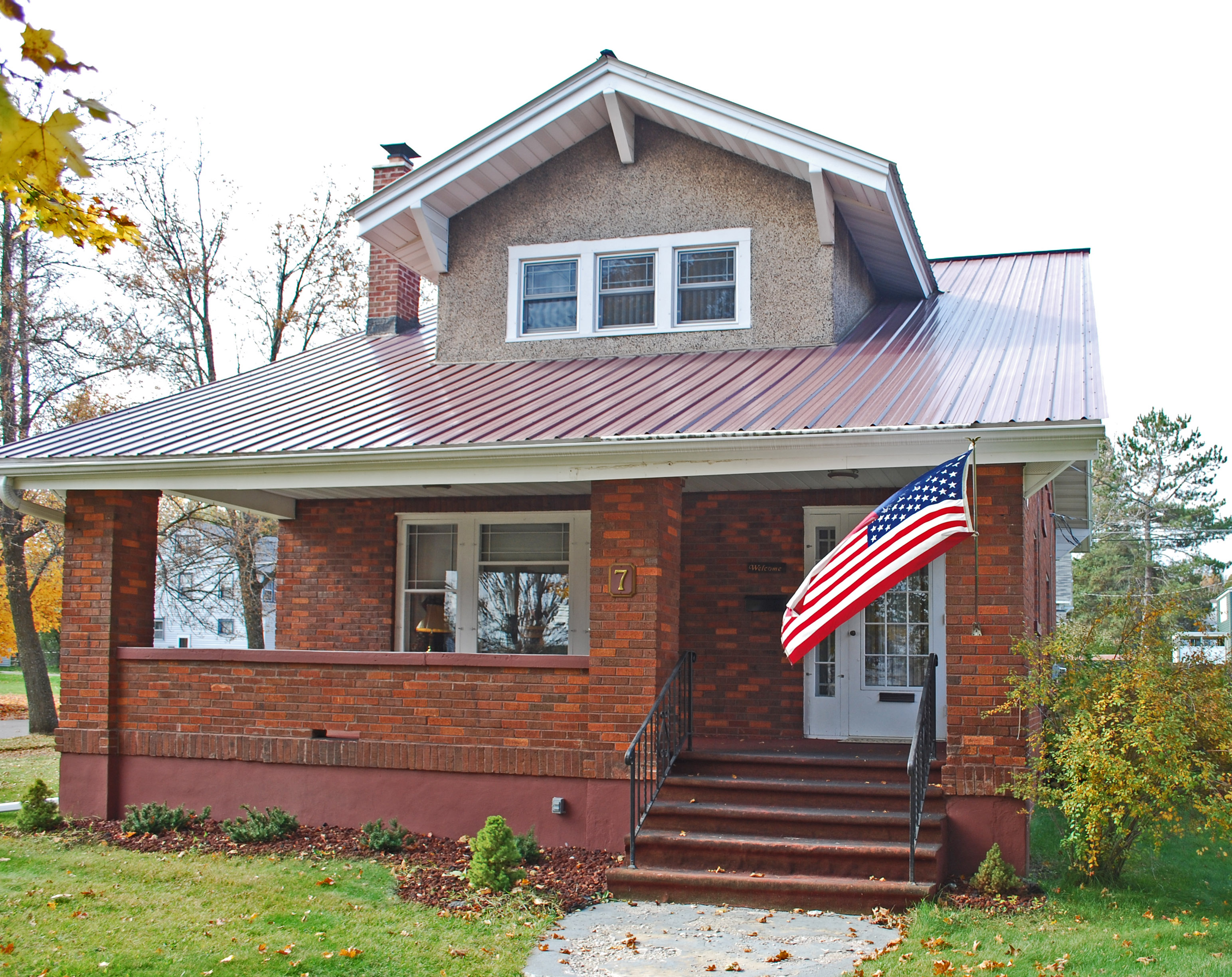

46.087778°N 88.645556°W

The Dennis J. Haggerty House is a brick bungalow-style house located at 7 North Seventh Avenue. It was built in 1926 for Dennis J. Haggerty, a skilled tradesman who worked for many local mines. Haggerty arrived in the Iron River area in 1879 and worked as a surveyor until 1882. He then hired on in the mechanical department of the Isabella Mine, and then the Nanaimo Mine until 1891. After 1891, he worked as an engineer and master mechanic for various mines until his retirement. The Dennis J. Haggerty House has a brick front veranda and stuccoed, gable-roofed dormer.

=== Gottfried Hane House ===
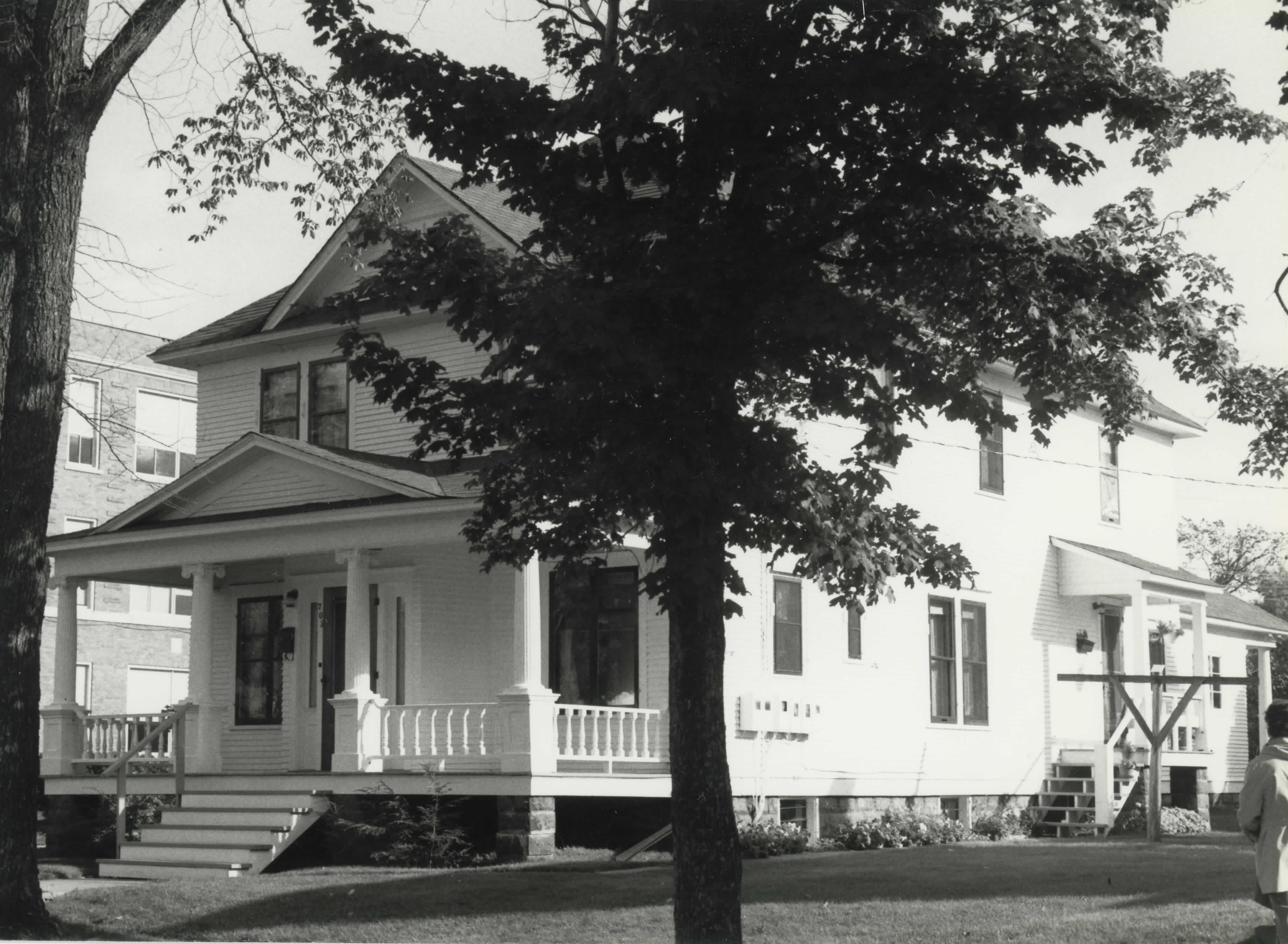

46.093333°N 88.646111°W

The Gottfried Hane House was a two-story frame house located at 703 West Cayuga Street. It was built in 1915 for Gottfried Hane, a Swedish-born blacksmith, who emigrated to the United States in 1889. He lived in Stambaugh for one year and then moved to Iron River and began a blacksmithing business with his brother, August Hane.

The Gottfried Hane House was a Queen Anne / Colonial Revival with a hipped roof and clapboard siding. The house has multiple gables and a two-story bay on the west side. The large front porch and the smaller side porch are supported by Ionic columns, while the rear porch is supported by Doric columns.

This house was destroyed by fire in approximately 1987.

=== Iron County Fair Exhibition Hall ===
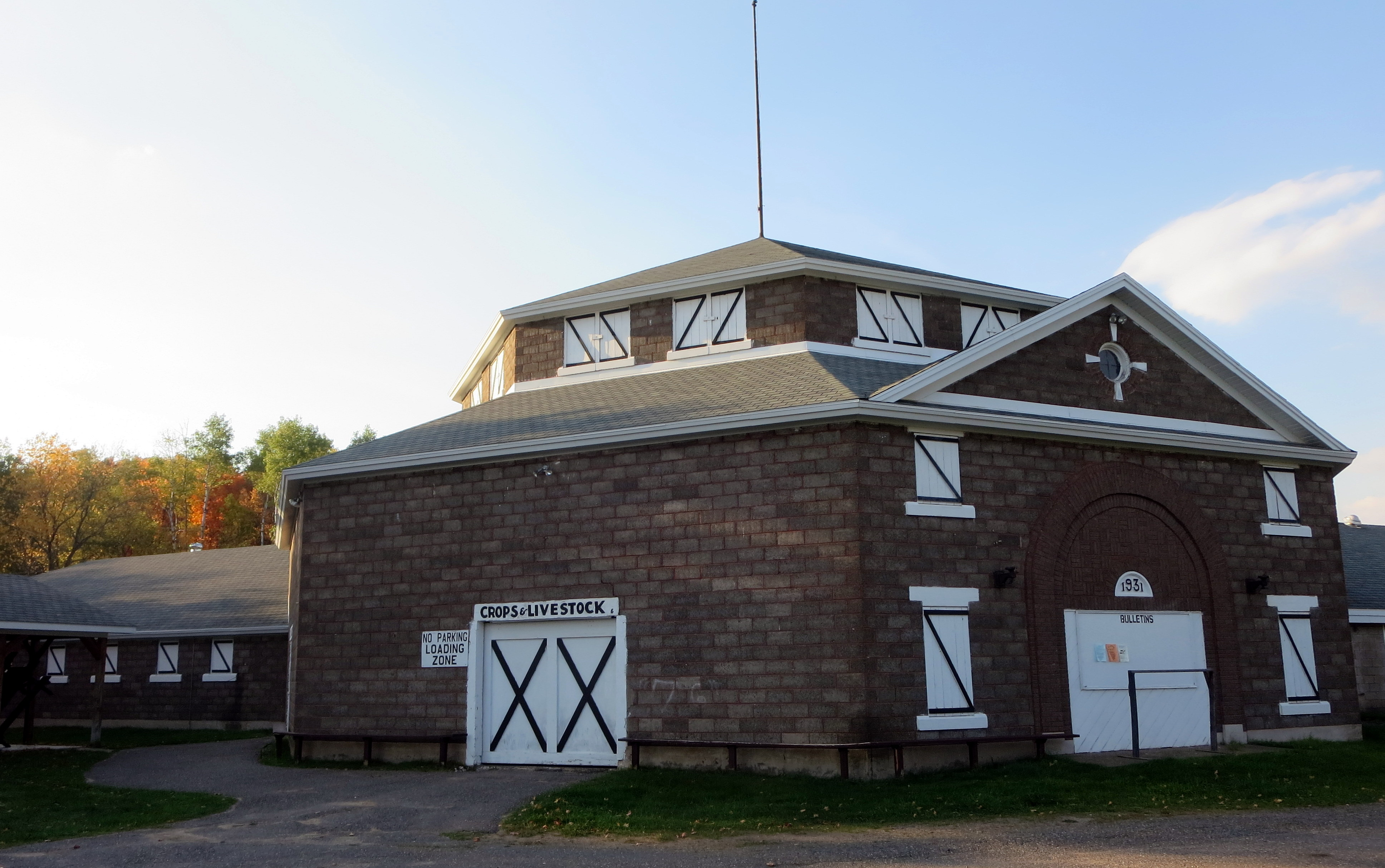

46.100556°N 88.646389°W

The Iron County Fair Exhibition Hall is a concrete block building located on West Franklin Street. The building, designed by architect David E. Anderson, was constructed in 1931 at the site of the Iron County Fair, which began in 1899. The building has a central, two-story octagonal section with single-story wings radiating outward. The building is perhaps the last of a series of polygonal county fair exhibition buildings built in Michigan, the first being built as early as 1860. The octagonal section of the Iron County Fair Exhibition Hall has a low pitched roof, clerestory windows, and a gable with a porthole window over the round-arched main entrance.

=== Iron River Creamery ===
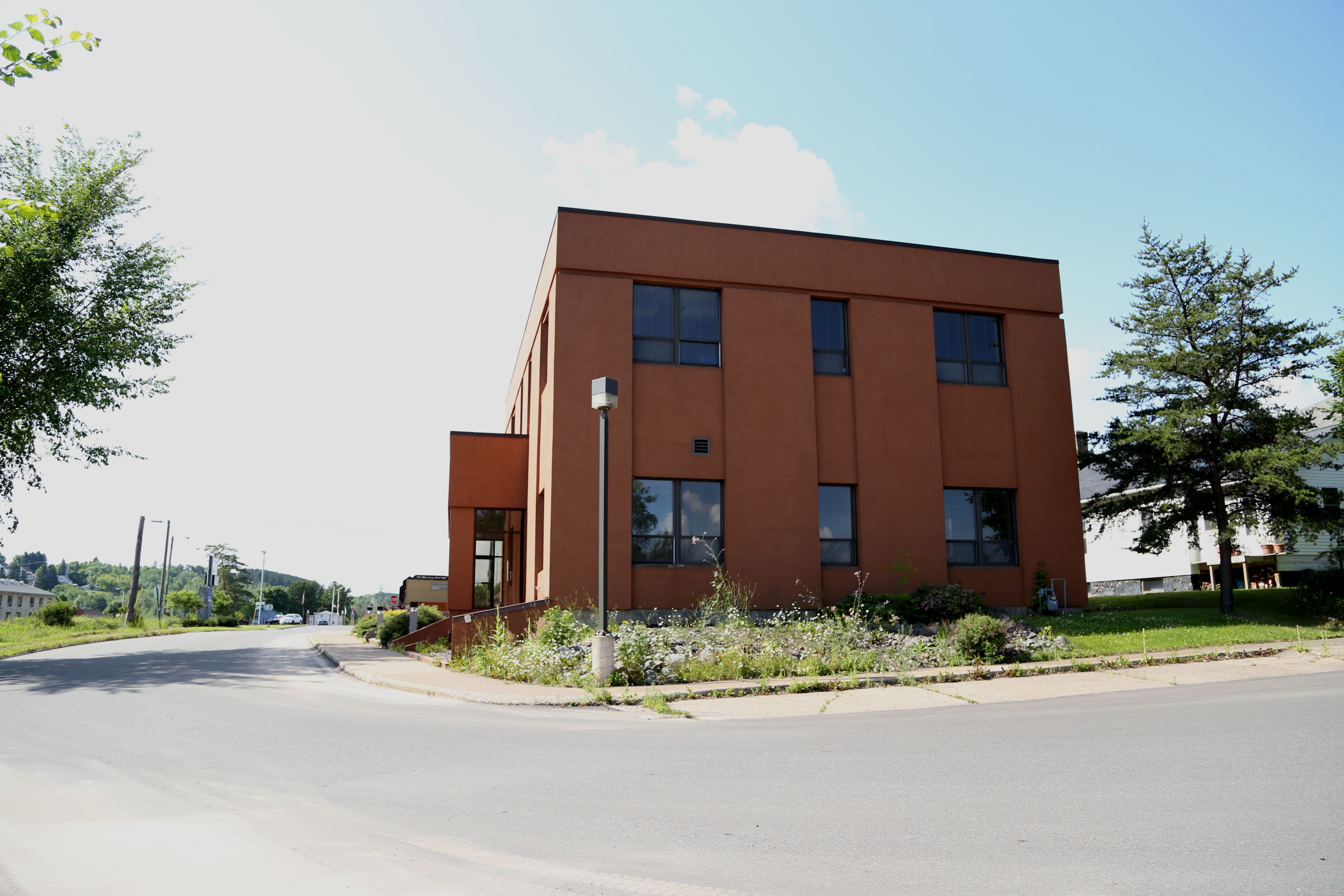
Site of the creamery with remodeled facade

46.093333°N 88.638056°W

The Iron River Creamery is a brick industrial building located at 5 West Cayuga Street. The creamery was founded in 1913 by Henry H. Frailing and quickly outgrew the original building. Frailing built this new, larger creamery building in 1920. A rear wing housing cheese-making equipment was added in 1941. The Iron River Creamery was sold to the Fairmont Food Company in 1957, and the building was eventually occupied by the Bigari Electric and Refrigeration Company.

The Iron River Creamery is architecturally significant as a good example of commercial architecture in the Classical Revival style. The creamery is a two-story brick building with a symmetrical facade emphasizing large brick pilasters. Light-colored brick is laid in a zigzag pattern between the first- and second-story windows and highlights the pilasters. The building is topped with a pressed metal cornice and a sandstone-trimmed parapet.

=== Iron River Town Hall ===
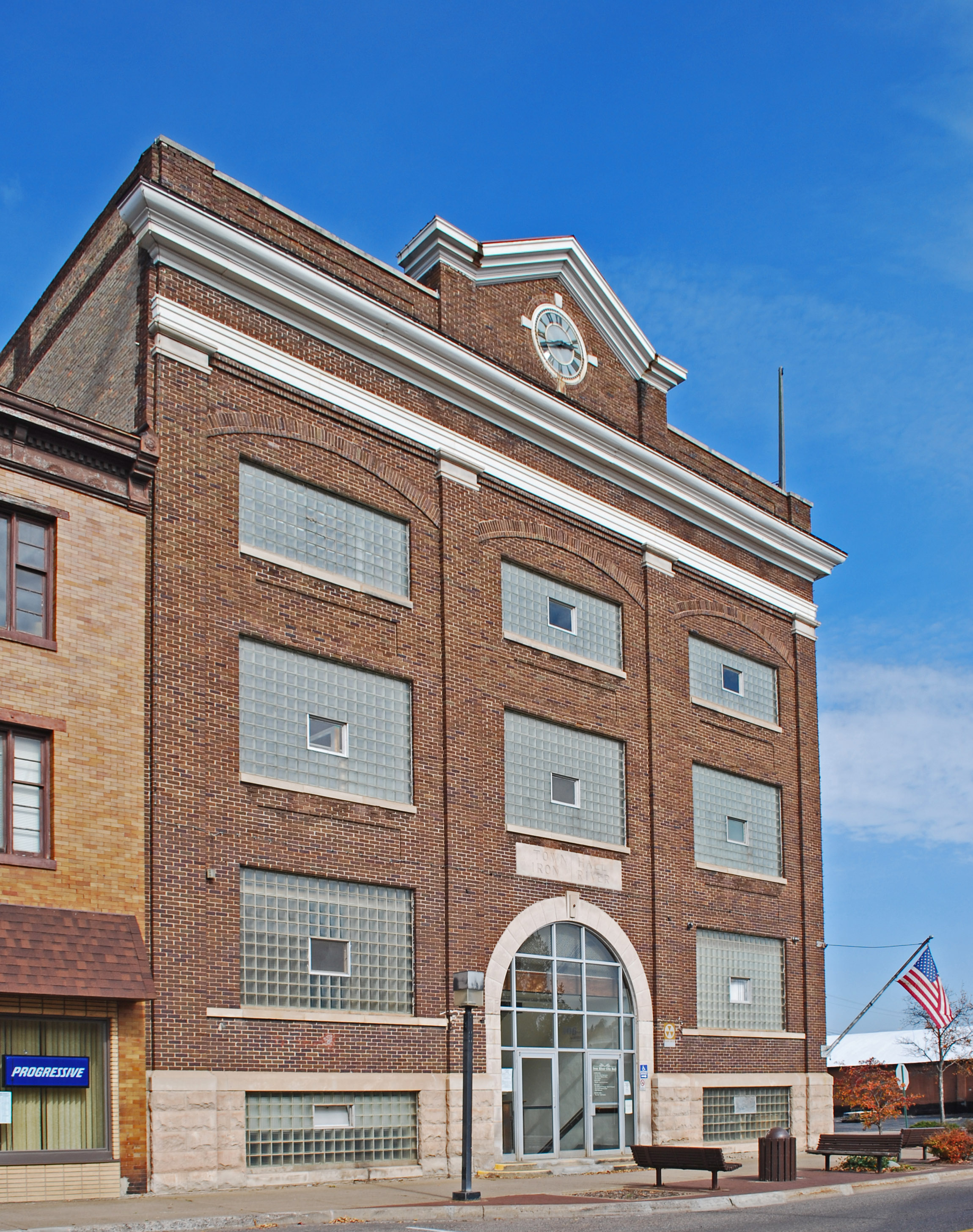

46.091944°N 88.639167°W

The Iron River Town Hall (now the City Hall) is a government building located at 106 West Genesee Street. The building was constructed in 1915, thirty years after Iron River's incorporation as a village. The structure was designed by architect Samuel C. Allen, of Flint, Michigan, and built by contractors Jacobson and Kohl. The building was modernized in 1964, and it continues to serve the City of Iron River.

The building is a three-story rectangular Neo-Classical structure built of red brick and sitting on a sandstone foundation. Arched portals cover entryways at the front and side. Pilasters divide the facade, which is topped with a pressed metal cornice and a brick parapet. A clock sits in a small gable at the parapet line. During the 1964 modernization, the original windows were replaced by glass block. However, the dark-stained wood trim interior has remained virtually unaltered over the years. The Town Hall still epitomizes Iron River at the height of its prosperity in the early 20th century.

=== Joseph Joseph House ===
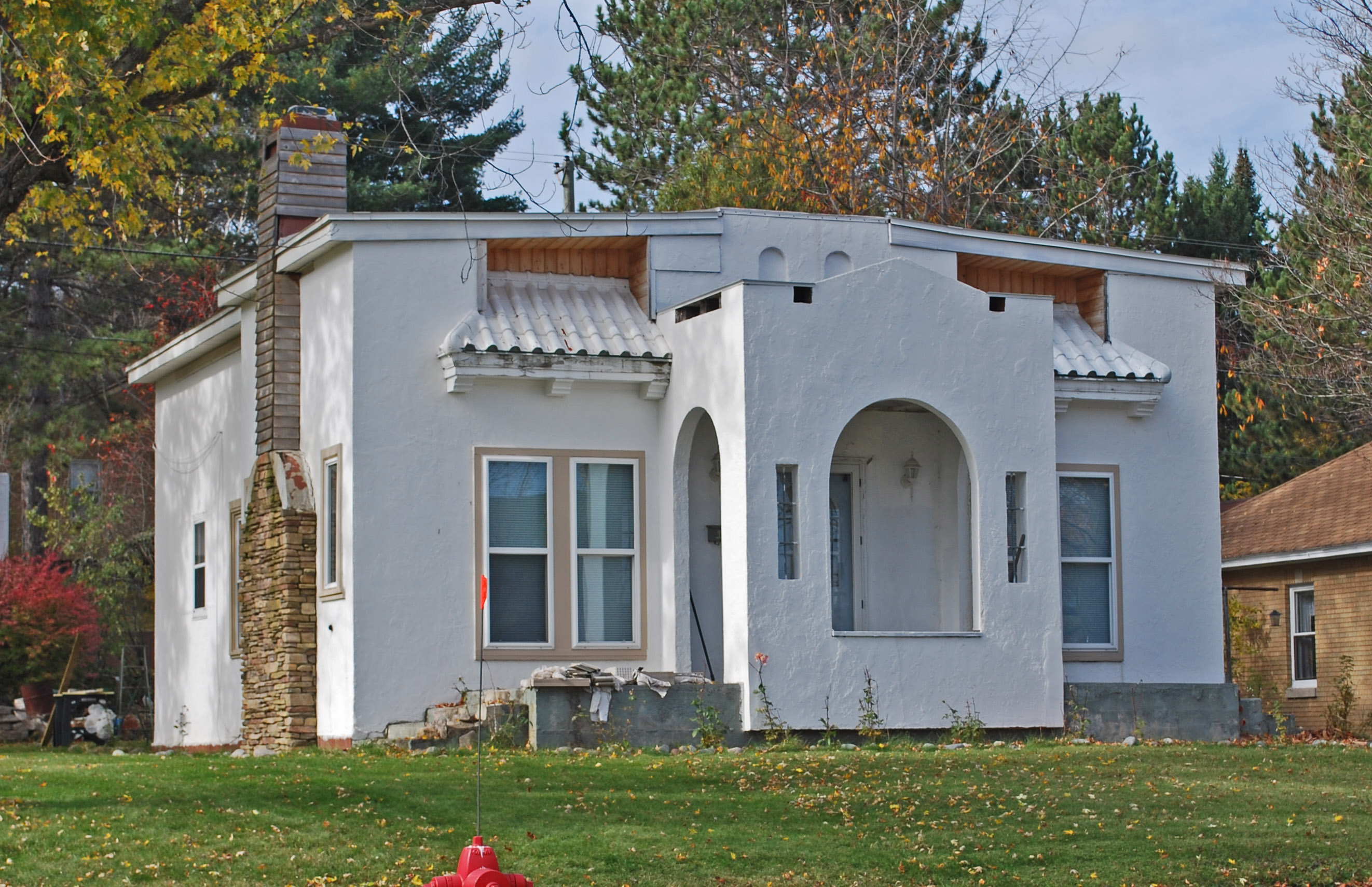

46.09°N 88.647222°W

The Joseph Joseph House is a stucco house located at 105 North Eighth Avenue. It was built in 1925 and first lived in by Joseph Joseph, an early Jewish settler. Joseph arrived in Iron River in 1914 and opened a clothing and millinery shop. He sold his clothing business in 1932 and became a traveling representative for a Chicago clothing firm. The house is a unique example of Spanish-style architecture in the county. It is a single-story structure covered with white stucco and with a red tile pent roof.

=== Lincoln School ===
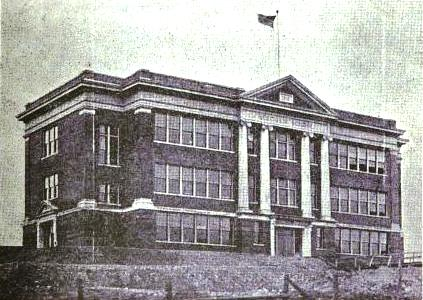

46.100833°N 88.640556°W

The Lincoln School was an educational building located on the northwest corner of Madison Street and Second Avenue. The school was designed by the Iron River architectural firm of Smith and Anderson, and constructed in 1916 by A.H. Proksch. Built at the peak of Iron River's prosperity, the school was the most highly developed Neo-Classical structure in Iron County. The school was a three-story brick structure with a pedimented portico featuring Ionic columns in the center of the front facade and brick pilasters on the building corners. The columns, main cornice, frieze, and the doors and door trim were constructed of metal, with other trim features of concrete.

This building is missing and presumed demolished.

=== Alexander MacKinnon House ===
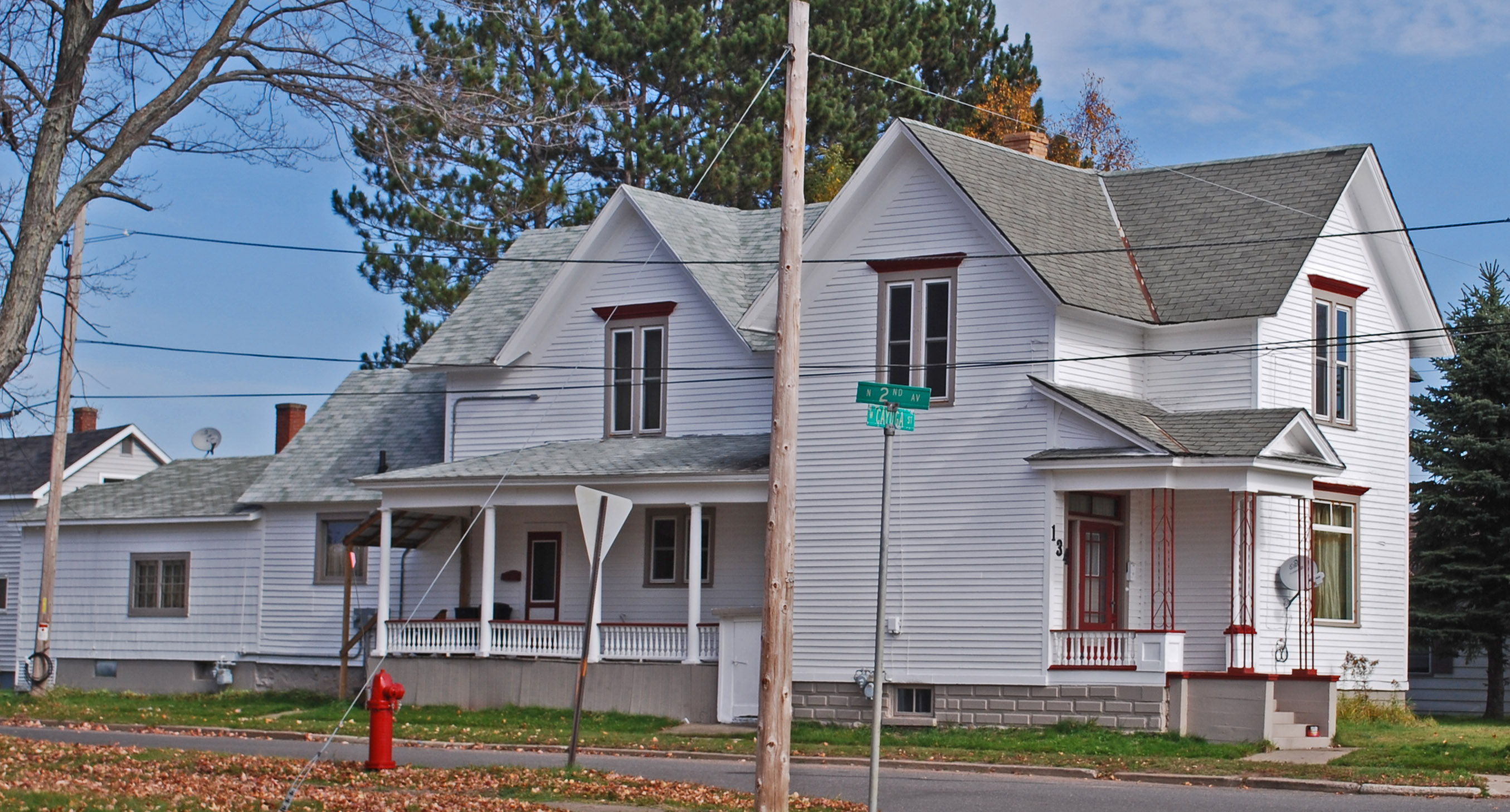

46.093611°N 88.639722°W

The Alexander MacKinnon House is a two-story frame house located at 134 Cayuga Street. The house was constructed in approximately 1900 for Alexander MacKinnon, who lived here until 1919. Alexander and his brother Donald MacKinnon pioneered the prospecting of the Iron River Valley for iron ore. The two first arrived in the area in 1878, and in 1881 platted the village of Iron River. This house is a multi-gable structure, sided with clapboard, and possessing two porches with turned-baluster railings and decorative woodwork.

=== Donald C. MacKinnon House ===
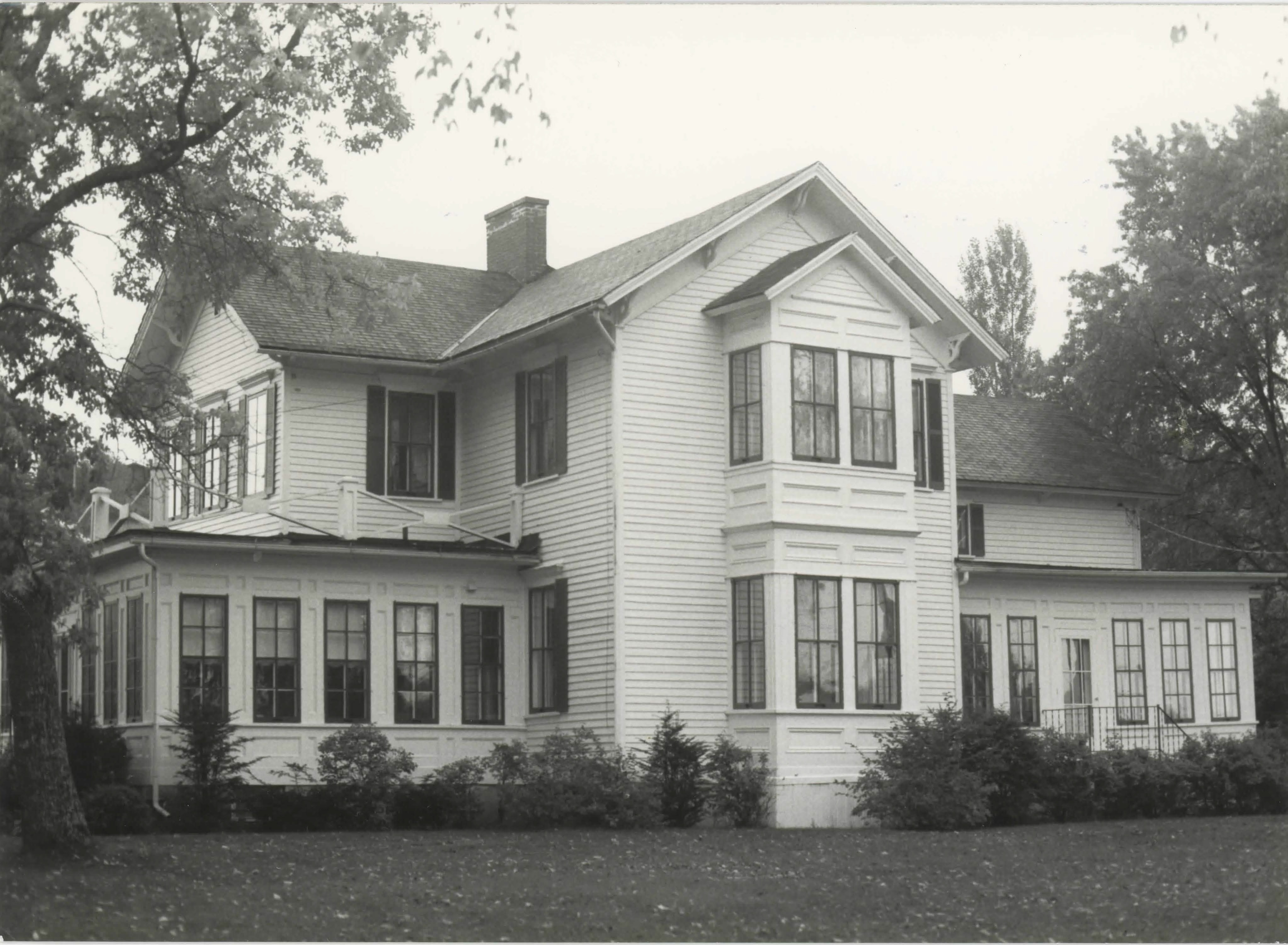

46.092222°N 88.648611°W

The Donald C. MacKinnon House was a two-story Late Victorian house located at 411 North Ninth Street. The house was constructed in 1885 for Donald MacKinnon. Donald and his brother Alexander MacKinnon pioneered the prospecting of the Iron River Valley for iron ore. The two first arrived in the area in 1878, and in 1881 platted the village of Iron River. Donald C. MacKinnon served as the first village president of Iron River.

The Donald C. MacKinnon House was a two-story frame structure with large, glassed-in porches. The cross-gable roof had wide eaves with scrolled brackets underneath exhibiting an unusual fleur de lis design. In 1927, the house was moved several blocks from its original location to make way for a new school.

This house is missing and presumed demolished.

=== William Moss House ===
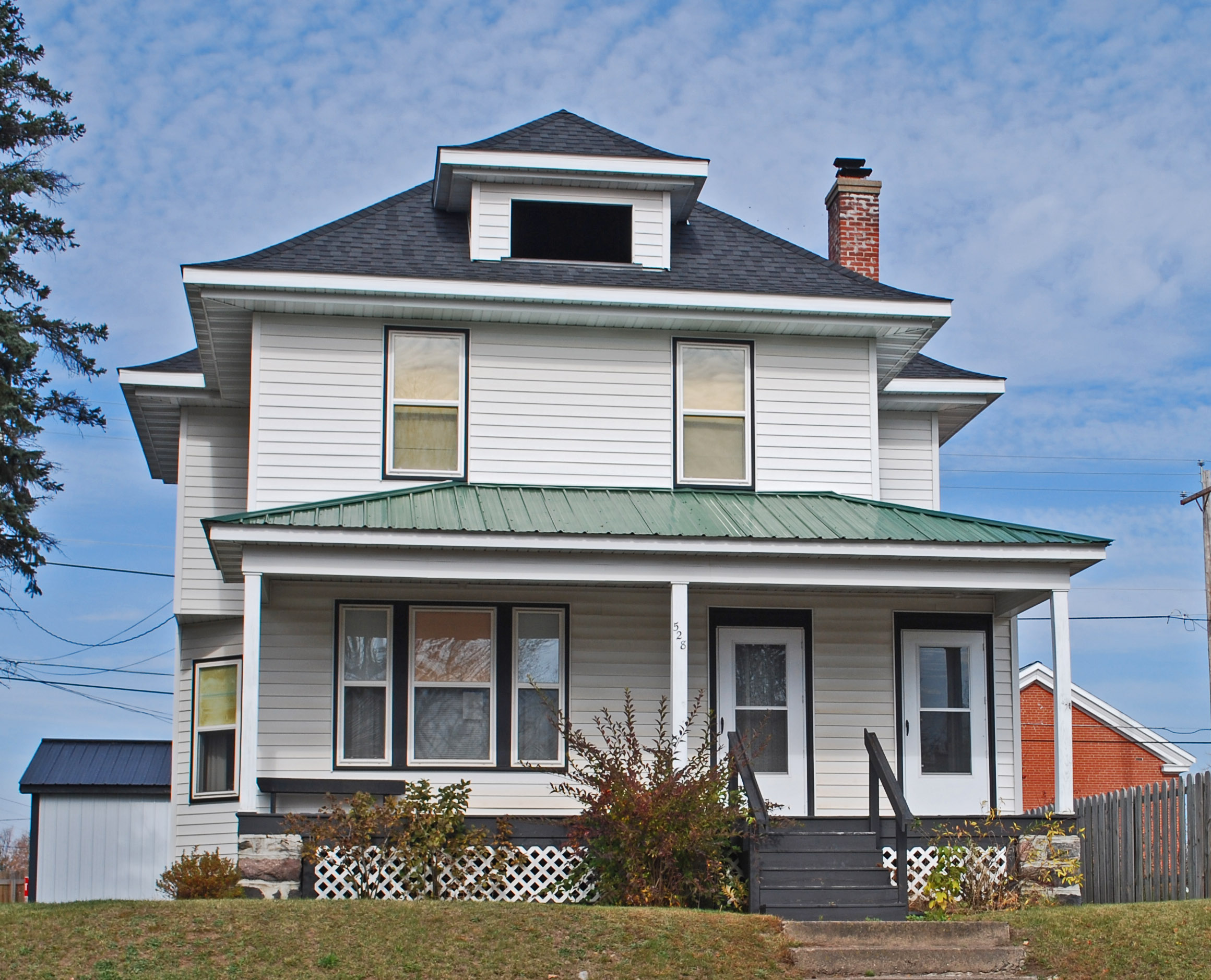

46.091944°N 88.644444°W

The William Moss House is a two-story duplex located at 528 West Genesee Street. This house was built in approximately 1908, and is unusual in Iron County as a middle-class duplex, more so because the floor plans of the first and second floor are dissimilar. It is likely that the original owner, William Moss, occupied the first floor and let out the second. The house is a two-story structure with hipped roof, bracketed eaves, and narrow clapboard siding. It has an Ionic front porch and geometric pattern window sash.

=== Munro – M.A. Hanna Mining Company Office Building ===
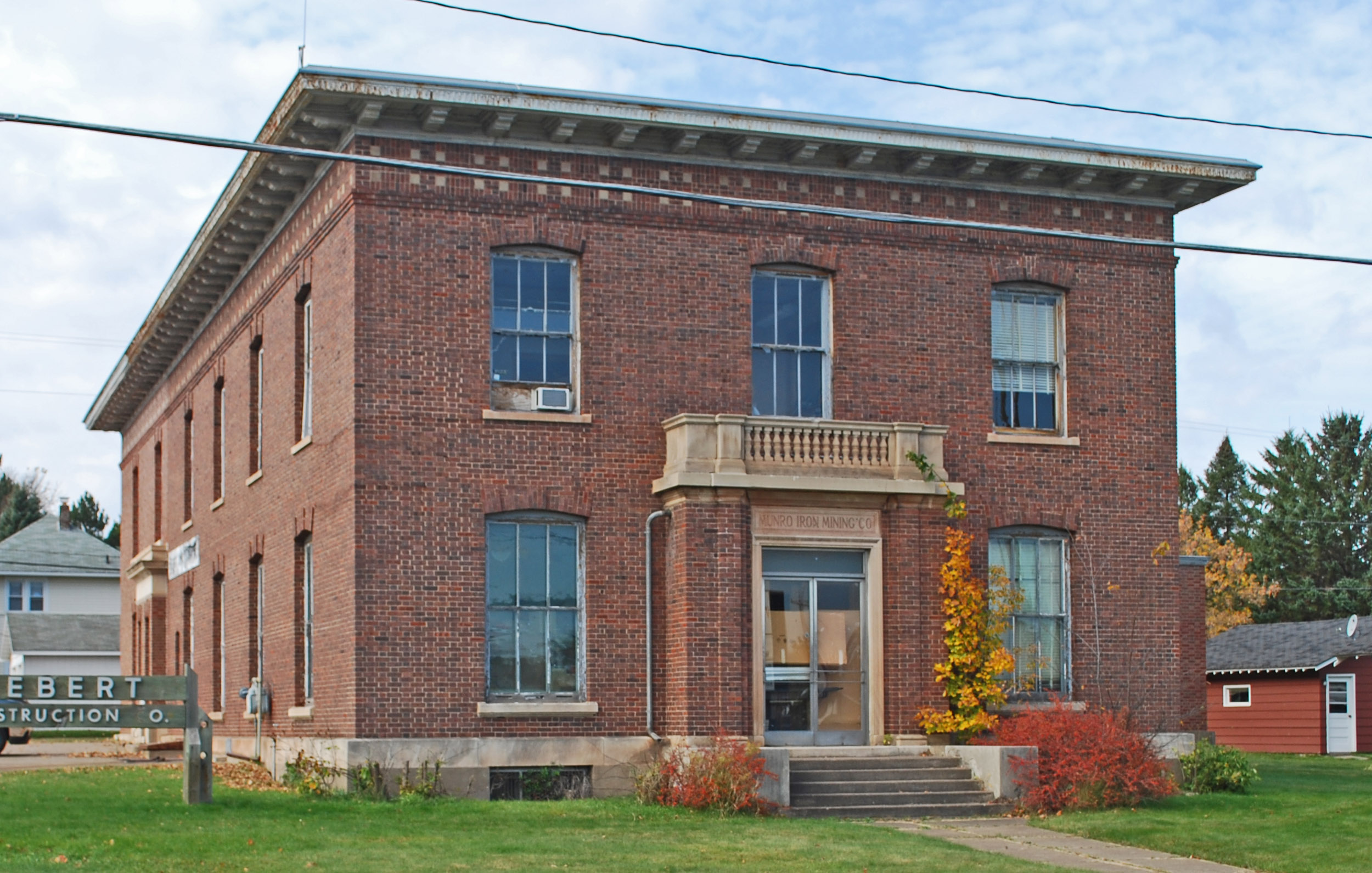

46.089167°N 88.643056°W

The Munro – M.A. Hanna Mining Company Office Building is an office building located at 107 North Fourth Street. The building was constructed in approximately 1920 by the Munro Mining Company, which in 1929 was acquired by M. A. Hanna Company. A rear wing was added to the structure in 1950. The Hanna Company used the structure as its local headquarters until 1969, when they sold it to the City of Iron River. The building later housed the Dickinson-Iron Community Action Agency.

The Munro – M.A. Hanna Mining Company Office Building is a large, symmetrical, two-story, Classical Revival brick structure with a projecting stone-trimmed front entrance. The Flemish bond exterior is augmented by a frieze of decorative brickwork and segmental-arch windows.

=== St. Mary's Assumption Catholic Church ===
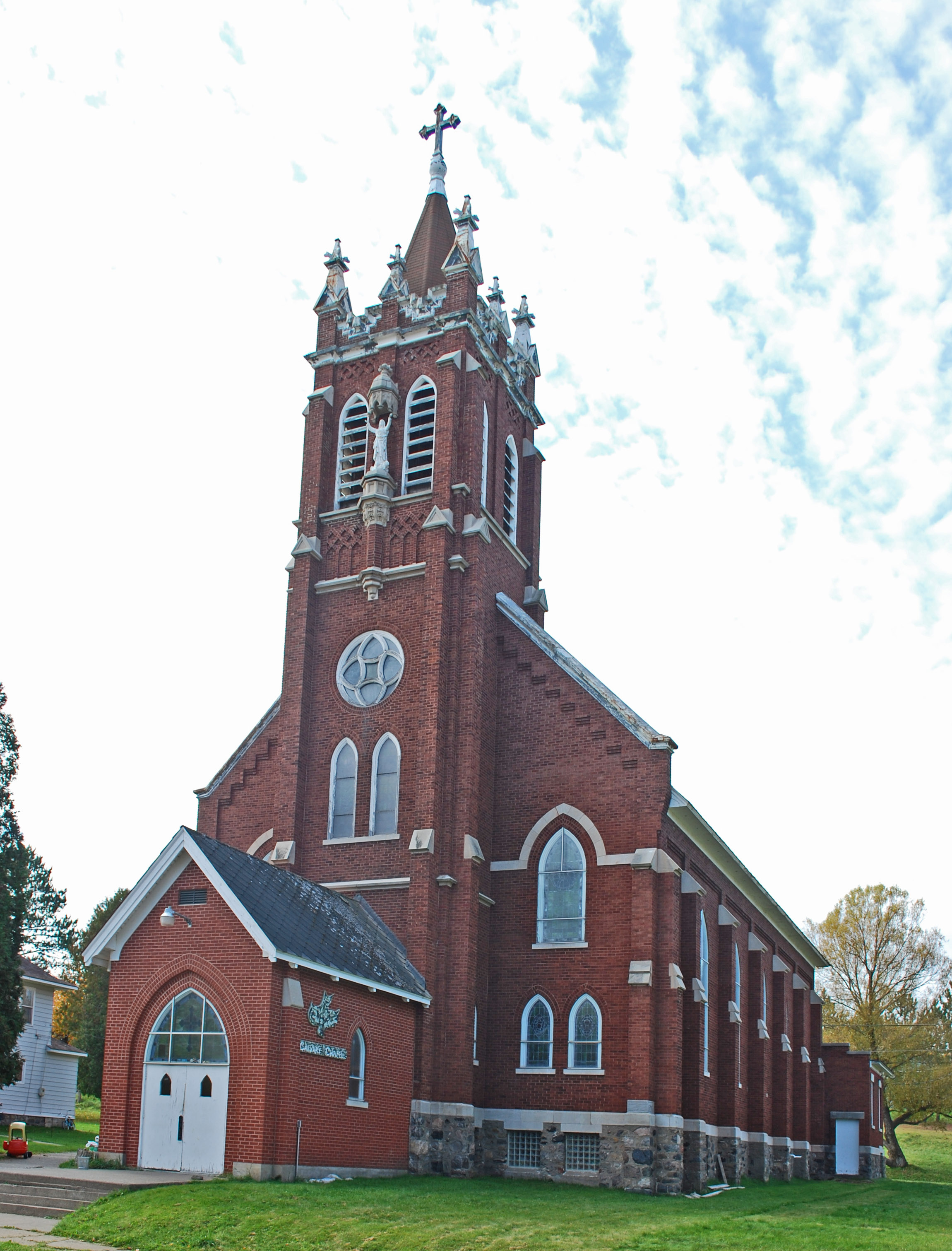

46.089444°N 88.644722°W

Saint Mary's Assumption Catholic Church is a church located at 105 Fifth Avenue. The church was built for local Catholics of Polish ancestry. The basement was constructed in 1910-11 and the upper portion was constructed in 1920-22 from a design by Milwaukee architect Erhard Brielmaier. The church is a Gothic Revival gable-roofed buttressed rectangular structure with a square belfry surmounted by an octagonal spire and cross. The main body of the church is red brick with sandstone trim, with a raised rubble stone foundation. The belfry has decorative brickwork and small corner pinnacles. A one-story vestibule has been added to the front.

The parish was closed in 1981-82 and parishioners moved to the nearby St. Agnes. The building is now used by the Calvary Chapel.

=== Scalcucci's Grocery ===
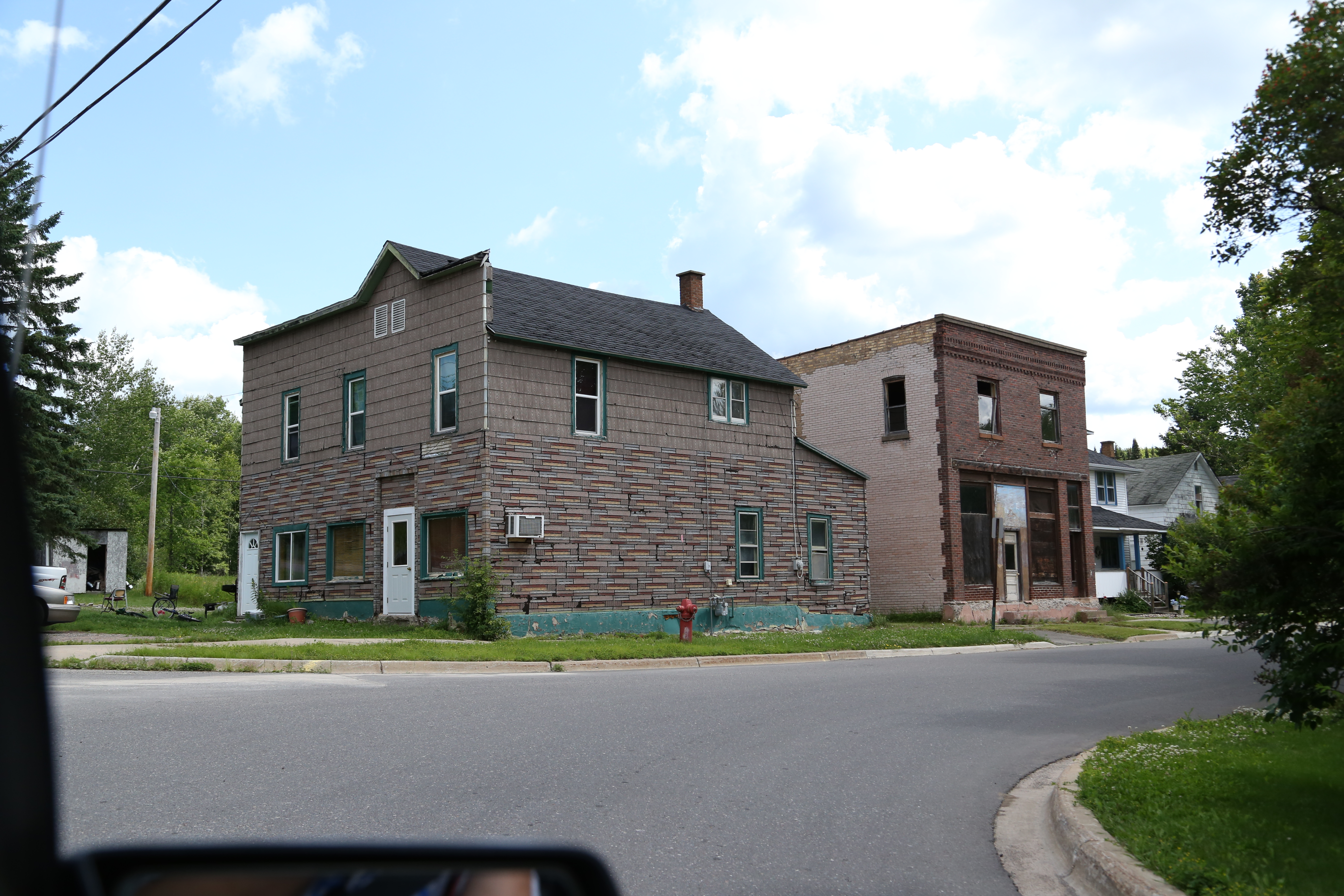

46.108333°N 88.637222°W

The Scalcucci's Grocery is a commercial building located at 2102 River Avenue. The building was constructed in 1905, and in 1914 was purchased by John Scalcucci. Scalcucci operated a grocery store on the first floor and lived on the second. The grocery is significant as the site of the February 1920 incident which touched off the "Rum Rebellion." Even after the beginning of Prohibition, the Scalcucci family continued to produce wine, using a loophole in the Volstead Act that allowed them to the ill-defined "non-intoxicating cider and fruit juice exclusively for home use." Local police disagreed with the Scalcucci's definition, and seized several barrels of wine stored in the Scalcucci basement. However, they had no warrant and Iron County State's Attorney Martin S. McDonough refused to press charges. Central state prohibition director Major A.V. Dalrymple declared Iron County in open rebellion against prohibition and descended on Iron County in force. However, McDonough secured a warrant for Dalrymple's arrest in the case that he made any arrests without warrants of his own. Eventually a compromise was reached, and Dalrymple left with no arrests made.

Scalcucci's Grocery is a two-story, frame structure with a gable roof and a false-front facade. A single-story shed-roof addition is at the rear. The store's exterior is currently covered in asphalt siding and asbestos shingles, and the storefront has been altered. However, the store's interior, including the basement and winepress which started the nationally "Rum Rebellion" controversy, remains largely intact.

=== Robert H. Sturgeon House ===
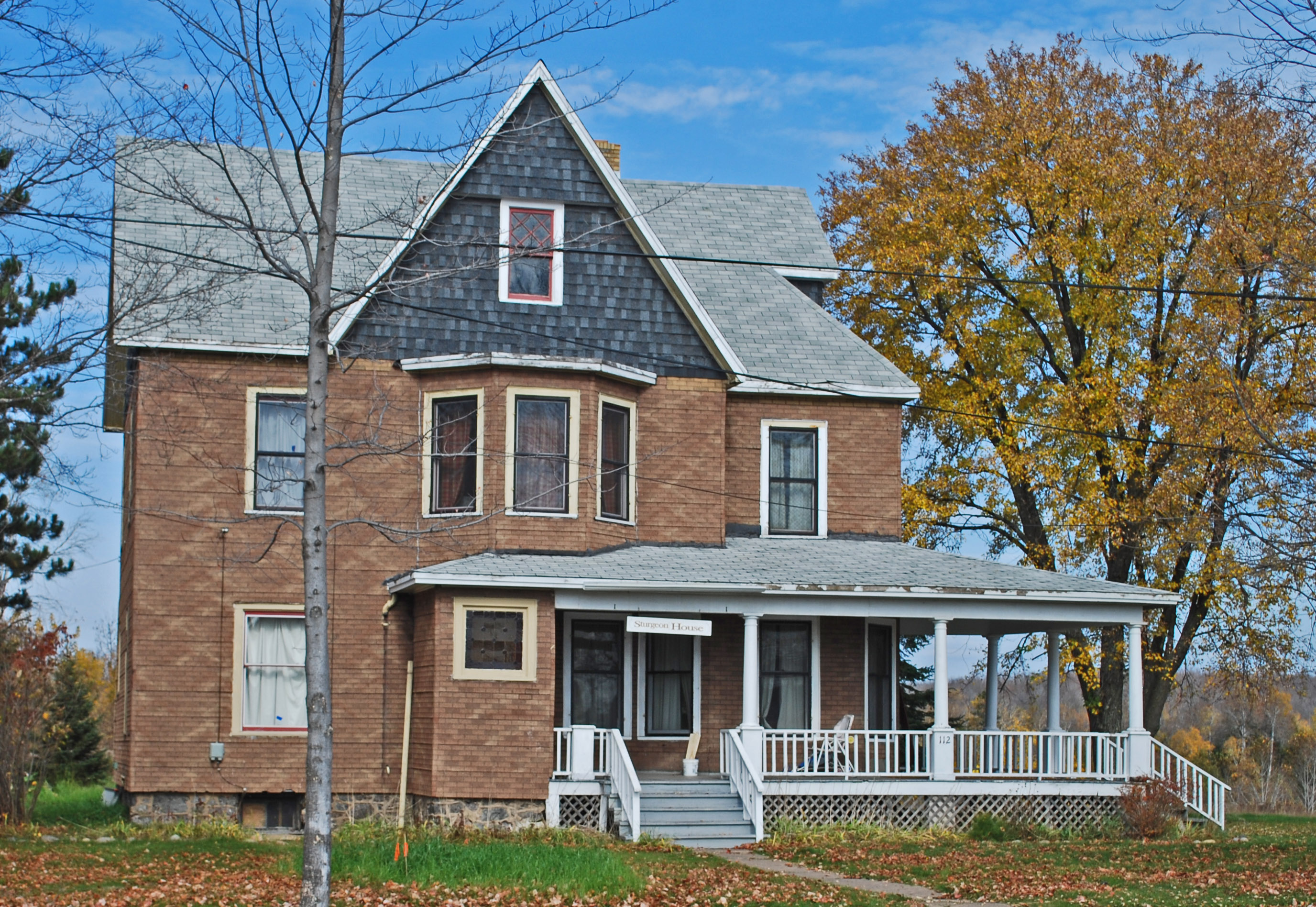

46.093889°N 88.638889°W

The Robert H. Sturgeon House is a building located at 112 Cayuga Street. The house was built in approximately 1900, and is notable as the residence of Dr. Robert H. Sturgeon, the first physician in Iron River. Dr. Sturgeon worked as a physician for local mining companies, ran his own private practice, and helped found the first hospital in Iron River. Dr. Sturgeon also owned commercial real estate in Iron River and served as Iron River's assessor and treasurer.

The Sturgeon house is a 2 1/2-story Queen Anne house with a projecting cross-gable roof and a conical turret. A large Tuscan-column wraparound porch with balustered railing runs across the front. The house contains windows with colored glass lights, intricate interior woodwork, and the original paneling and lighting fixtures. The exterior finish has been covered with asphalt siding and asbestos shingles.

=== William J. Tully House ===
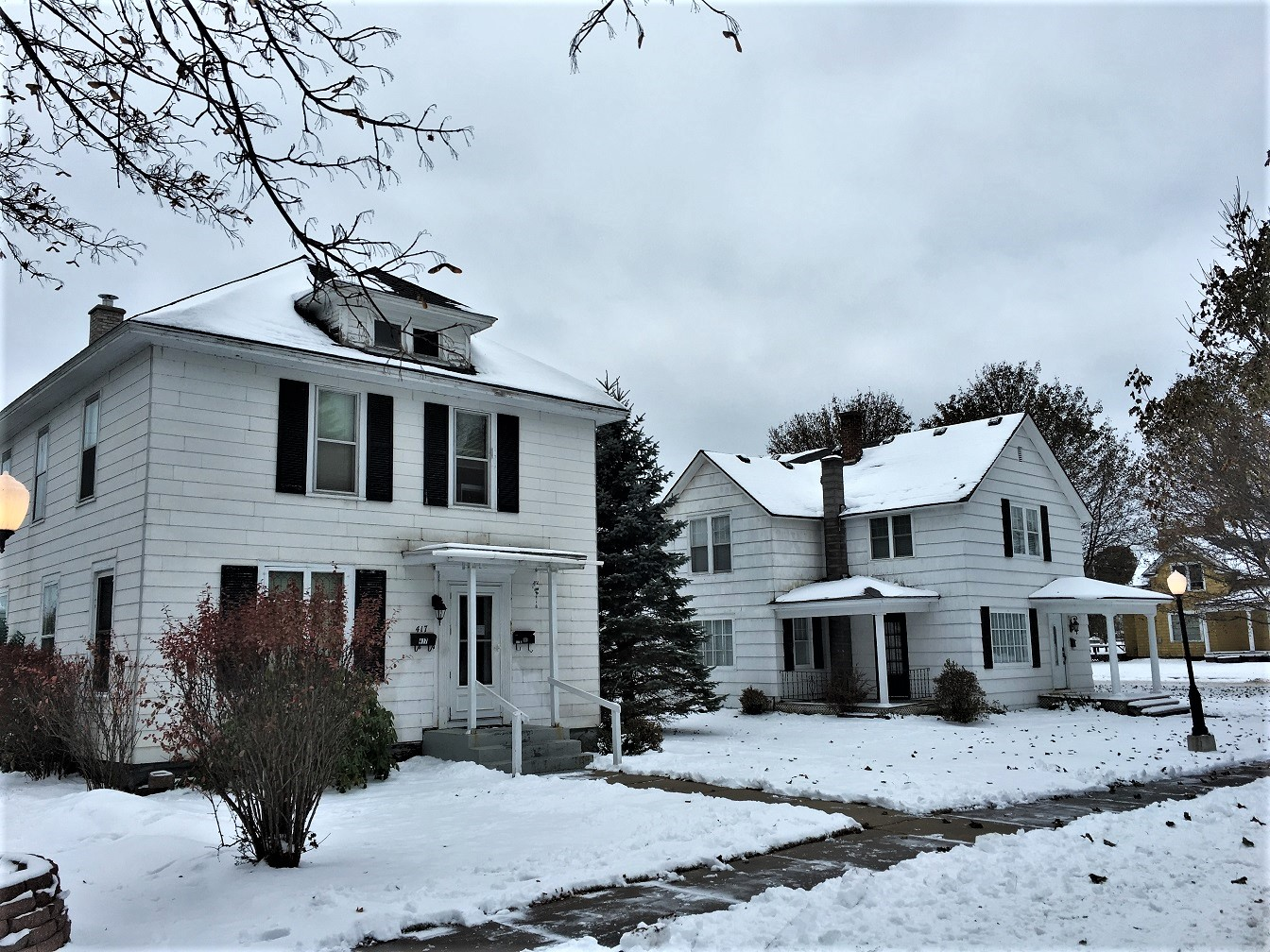

46.093611°N 88.644167°W

The William J. Tully House is an American foursquare house located at 519 West Cayuga Street. The house was built in 1909, and served as the last residence of William J. Tully, an early resident of Iron River and eventual mine owner. Tully served as county supervisor from 1888 to 1890 and as Iron County sheriff from 1891 to 1899. After leaving his post as sheriff, Tully began prospecting for iron ore and eventually had interests in the Baker, Swanson, and Tully mines. Tully lived in this home until his death in 1923.

The Tully House is a square, frame structure with broad bracketed eaves. and a partially enclosed front porch extending to form a porte cochere. Ornamental foliage is carved into the entranceway gable, and a tympanum west side windows. Fluted pilasters flank the central second-story window.

=== Van Ornum's Addition Historic District ===
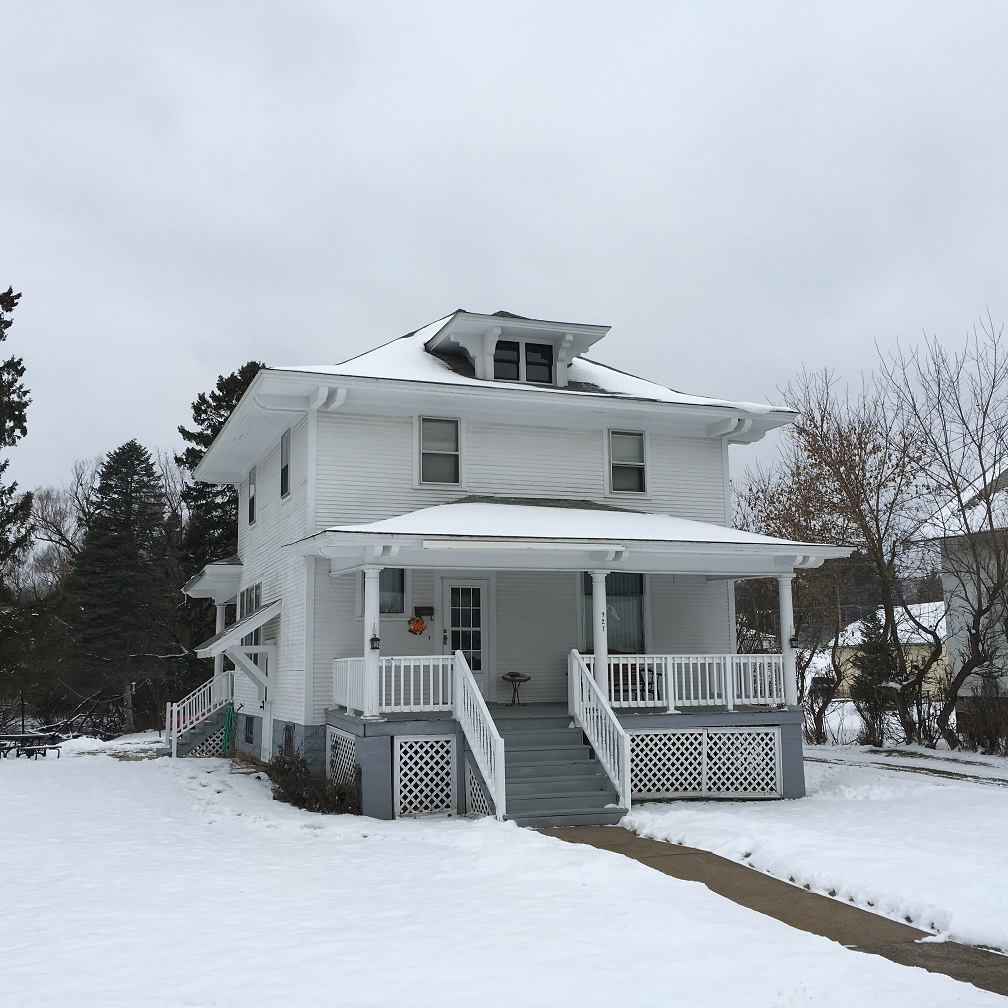

46.097778°N 88.642222°W

The Van Ornum's Addition Historic District is a residential district located at 927, 937, 941, 947, and 953 Fourth Street. The district contains the houses on one block of Fourth, from the Iron River to Olive Street. These include four bungalows built by Edward J. Van Ornum as well as Van Ornum's own residence, a two-story hipped roof structure. Van Ornum was a prominent Iron River builder, lumberman, and developer. He built his own American foursquare residence in about 1910 when he was the owner of a successful lumberyard. Van Ornum soon became a realtor, then a developer. In 1929 he platted this addition, and in 1934 had the four bungalows constructed.

=== Harvey Van Wagner House ===
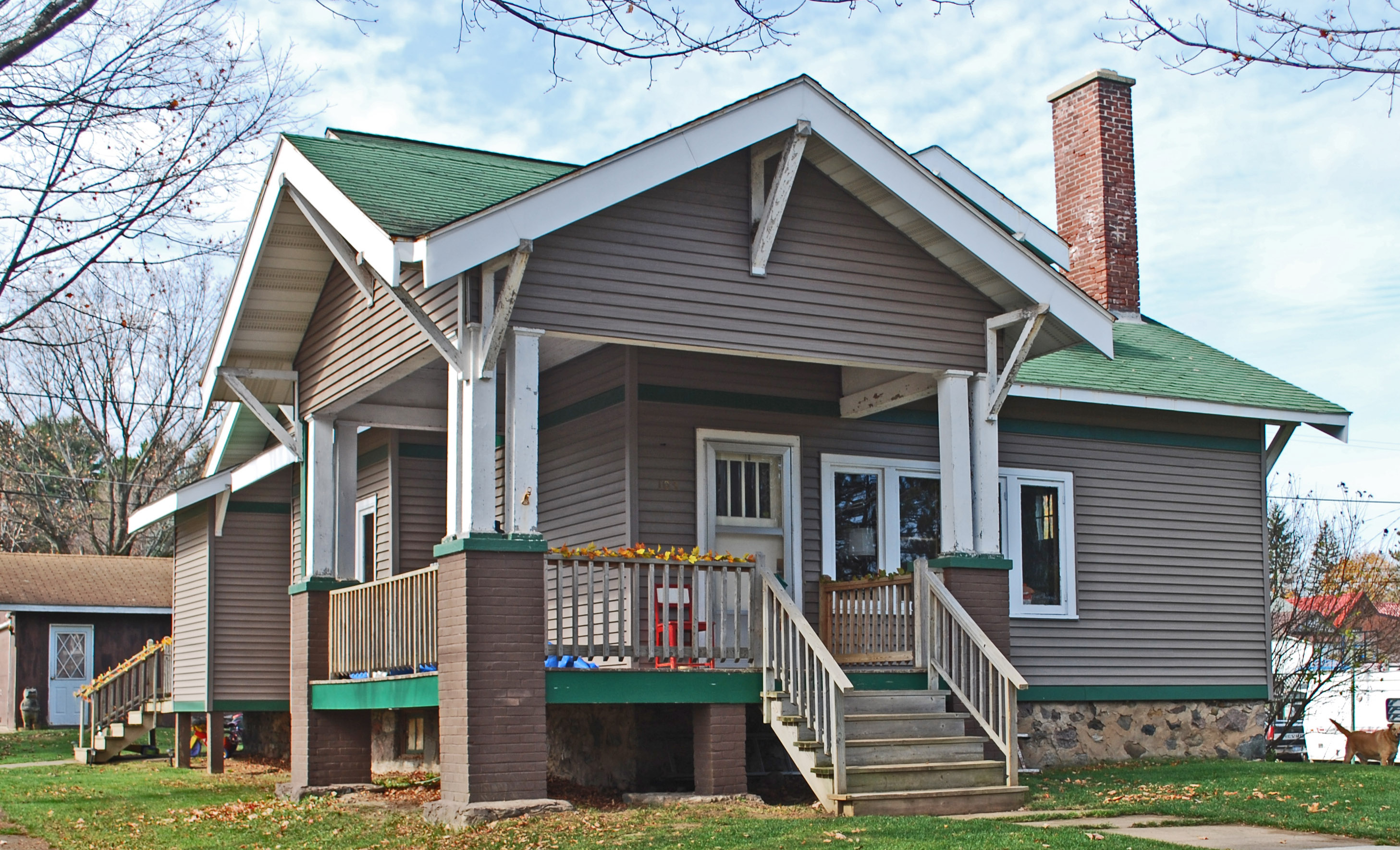

46.089167°N 88.645833°W

The Harvey Van Wagner House is a frame house located at 103 North Seventh Avenue. It was constructed in approximately 1920, and is a slight modification of Design B-7513 in the 1918 house-plan book "Modern American Homes," by C.L. Bowes. The house is clad in alternating narrow and wide rows of shingles and has a cross-gable porch resting on brick piers. The house was the home of Harvey Van Wagner, vice-president of Old Commercial Bank.

=== Wall-Seppanen House ===
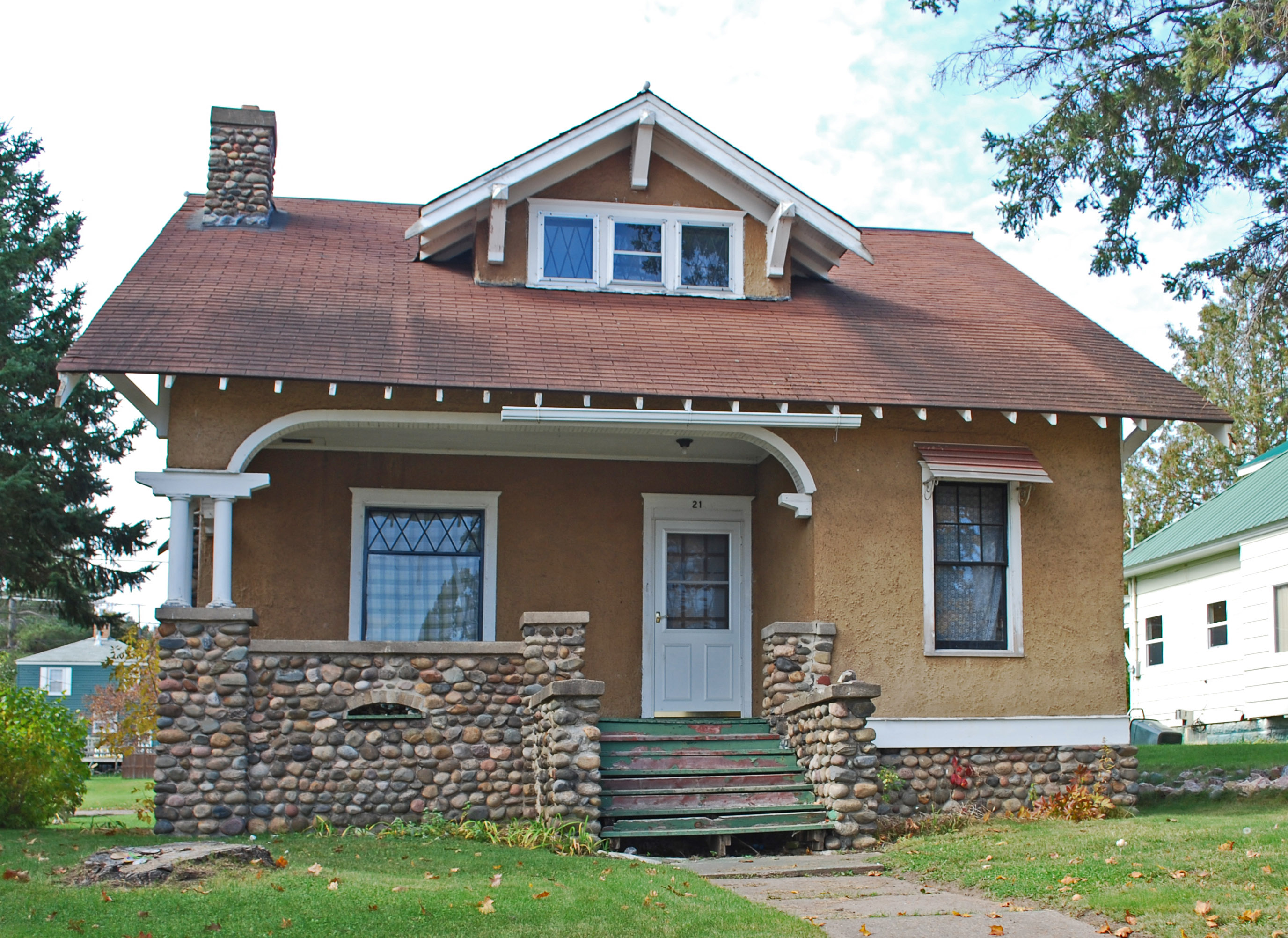

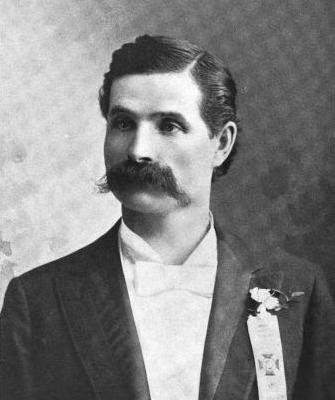
James S. Wall

46.088056°N 88.645833°W

The Wall-Seppanen House is a stone house located at 21 North Seventh Avenue. The house was built in approximately 1920, and is of a particularly pleasing bungalow design with craftsman elements, clad with stucco and cobblestones. It was once the home of James S. Wall, manager of the Oliver Iron Mining Company and president of the Miners' State Bank. The house was purchased in 1943 by Wayne E. Seppanen, who eventually became superintendent of the Caspian Mine.

=== Joseph Windsor House ===
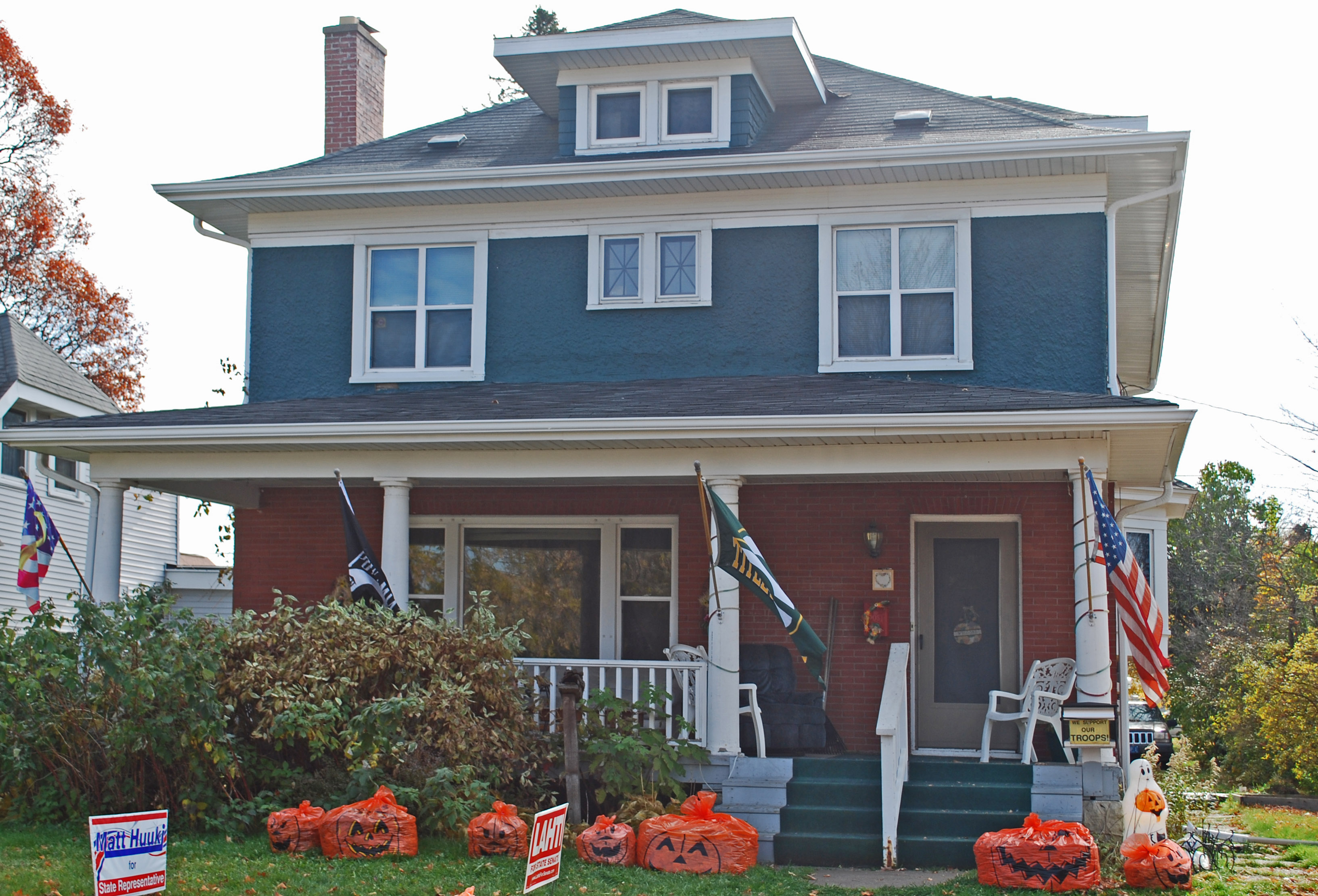

46.091667°N 88.645556°W

The Joseph Windsor House is a brick house located at 629 West Genesee Street. It was built in approximately 1912 for Joseph Windsor, who with his brother William, ran an undertaking and furniture business. The house is clad with brick on the first floor and stucco on the second. It has a hipped roof with widely overhanging eaves and a front porch with Tuscan columns.

== Stambaugh ==
In 1882, with their Iron River Mine showing promise, R. L. Selden and his son, William H. Selden, joined with Dr. Louis D. Cyr of Negaunee and Louis Stegmiller of Escanaba to plat a village next to the mine. The village was christened "Stambaugh" after John Stambaugh, president of the Tod, Stambaugh Company of Youngstown, Ohio, which had recently purchased the rights to the Iron River Mine. The Tod, Stambaugh Company built a number of frame houses for mining supervisors, and in 1890 the settlement was incorporated as a village.

Growth slowed in the late 19th century due to the Panic of 1893, but picked up again after 1900; electricity was introduced in 1908 and a town hall built in 1913. Due to its proximity to Iron River, Stambaugh developed only limited commercial properties, remaining a primarily residential community. In 1923 Stambaugh was incorporated as a city. Although Stambaugh suffered during the Great Depression along with other Iron County communities, it contained a number of valuable mining properties on its tax rolls, and was able to keep financially stable. In 2000, Stambaugh and Mineral Hills were merged into the nearby Iron River.

There are twelve structures and historic districts from what once was Stambaugh included in this MRA. They are summarized as follows:

=== George Hamilton House ===
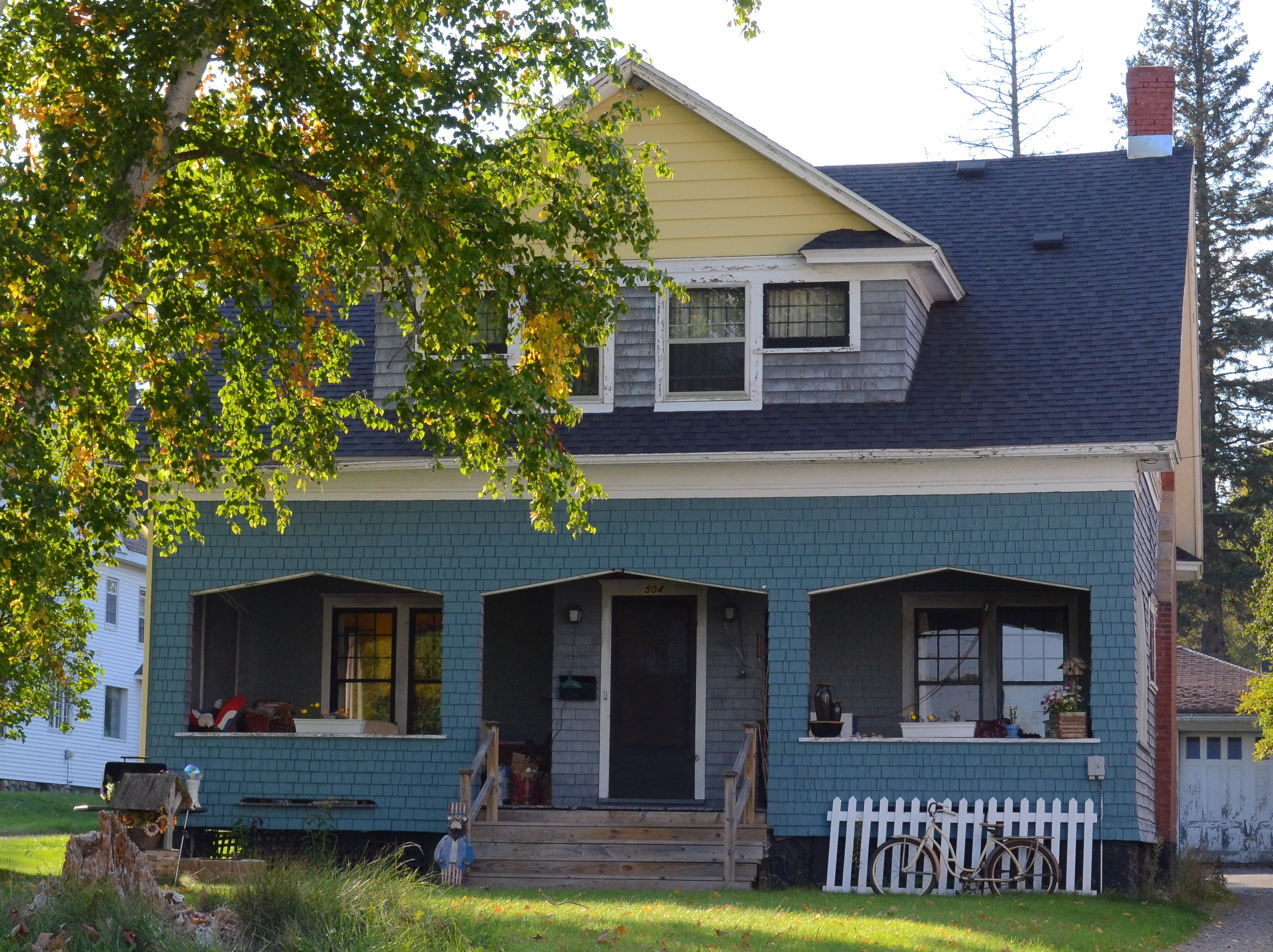

46.084167°N 88.643056°W

The George Hamilton House is a bungalow-style house located at 504 Seldon Road. It was built in 1914 as the home of George Hamilton, one-time city engineer and president of the Stambaugh village council in 1898. The house is a 1 1/2-story bungalow with a gable roof and walls clad with stucco and shingles. The windows have multi-light uppers and single-light lowers. The Hamilton House is one of the best preserved bungalows in Stambaugh.

=== M. A. Hanna Company Michigan District Superintendent's House ===
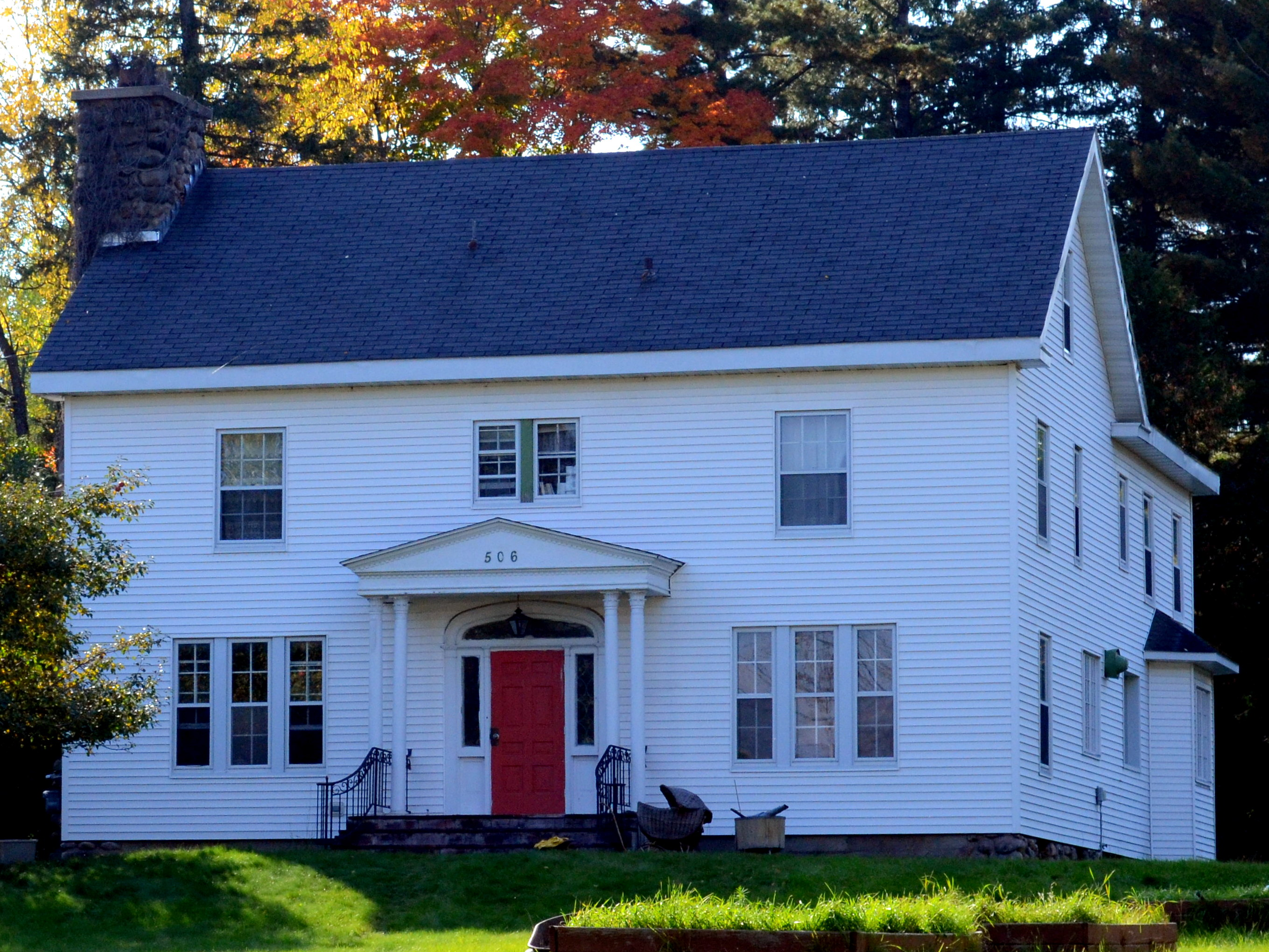

46.084167°N 88.643333°W

The M. A. Hanna Company Michigan District Superintendent's House is a two-story house located at 506 Selden Road. The house was built in 1933 by M.A. Hanna to house the chief executive officer of the company's local mines. The M.A. Hanna Company was a late-comer to Iron County, buying up already existing mines in the late 1920s, including the nearby Hiawatha Number One Mine. The Superintendent's House is a two-story Colonial Revival structure with a symmetrical facade with composite columns flanking the elliptically arched, fanlight-and-sidelight entrance.

=== John W. Hanson House ===
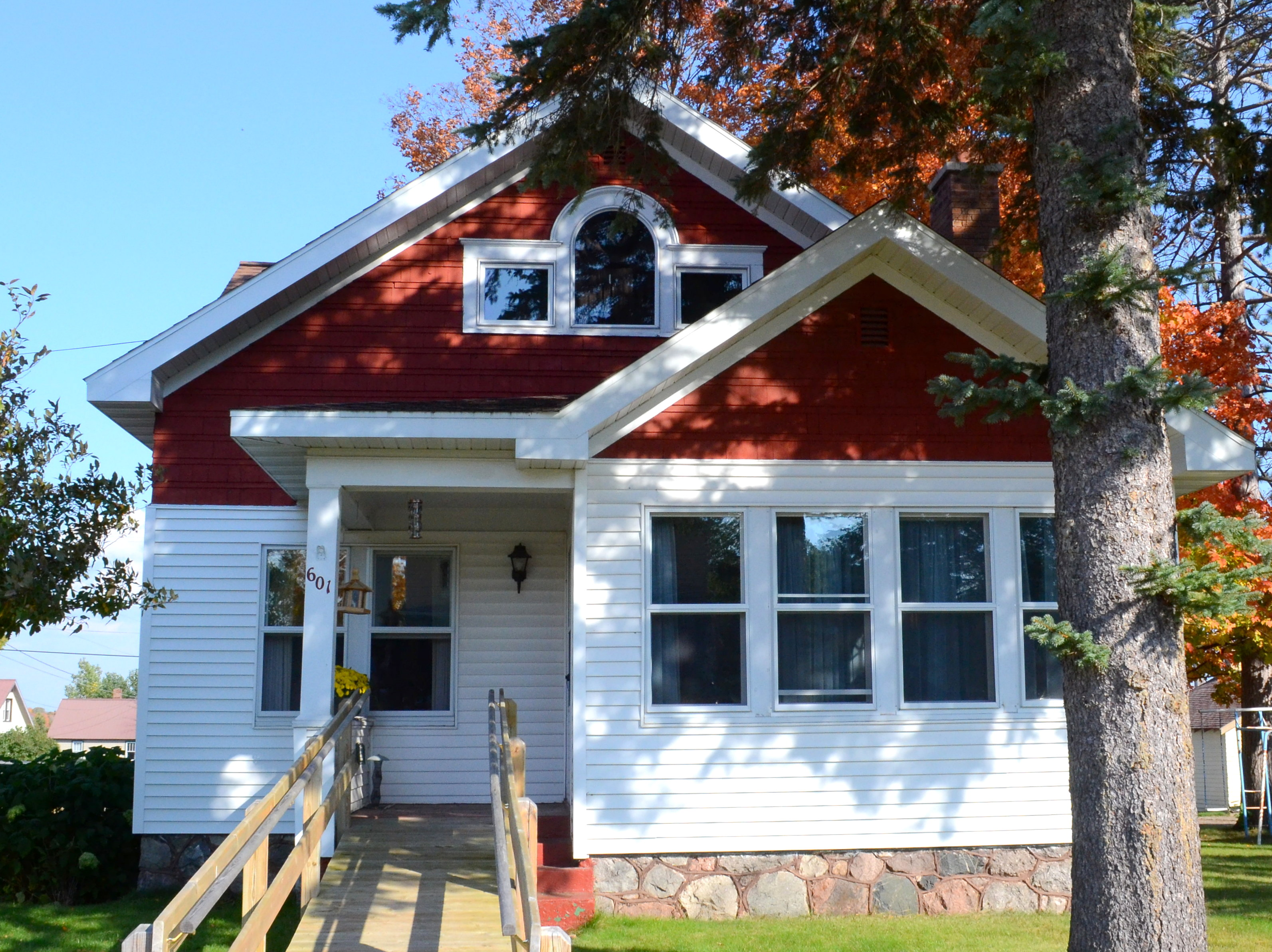

46.082778°N 88.625833°W

The John W. Hanson House is a 1 1/2-story frame bungalow located at 601 Roosevelt Avenue. It was built about 1920 for John W. Hanson. The house has clapboard siding on the first floor and alternating rows of narrow and wide wooden shingles on the second floor. It sits on a fieldstone foundation, and has a gently sloped gable roof with a prominent gable-roofed wall dormer and a front porch running half the length of the building. The house has stylized Federal details, including Palladian windows and a segmental-arch side porch. The Palladian windows in the gables make this house unique in the county.

=== Joseph Harris House ===
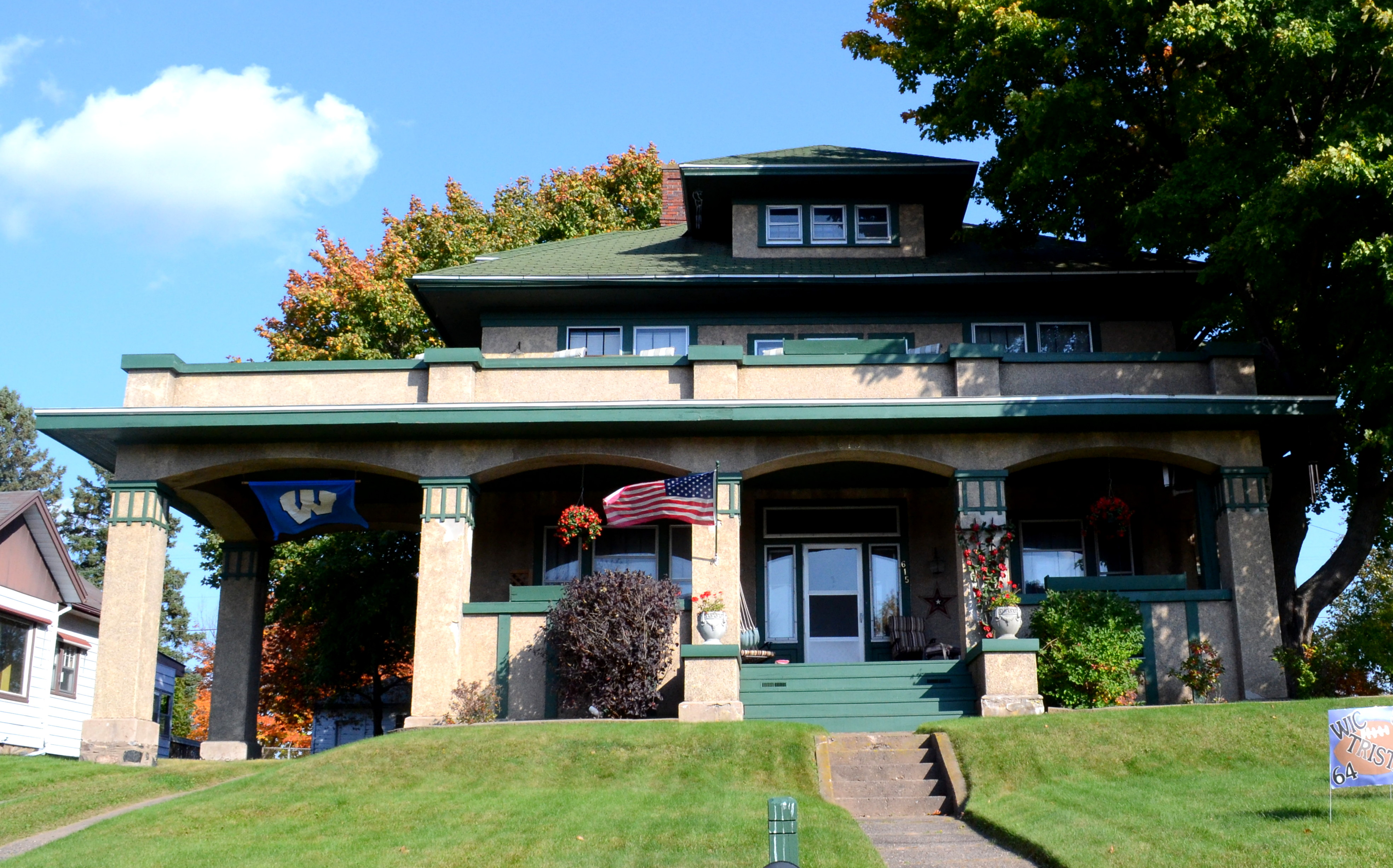

46.082222°N 88.631944°W

The Joseph Harris House is a two-story Prairie-style house located at 615 Washington Avenue. The house was first owned by Joseph Harris, owner of the Harris Clothing Store in Iron River, which operated from about 1910 to about 1925. The house is the purest Prairie-style structure in the county. It has a hipped roof, attic dormers, and is laid out in the American foursquare style. However, the form is altered by the massive segmental-arch front porch which extends to one side to form a porte cochere. The house has stucco walls, several leaded glass windows, wide porch eaves, and heavy pier supports with applied triglyph capitals.

=== Hiawatha Mine Number One Complex ===
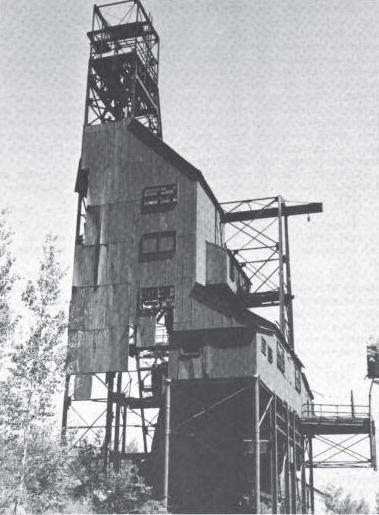

46.075833°N 88.643889°W

The Hiawatha Mine Number One Complex is a collection of five buildings covering four acres, located on the west side of Selden Road and north of 19th Street. Iron ore was first mined at this site in 1893 by William Seldon and Findley Morrison. Development was intermittent until 1899, after which it was operated by the Munro Iron Mining Company and then the Hanna Iron Ore Company; the Hiawatha became one of the most productive mines in the county, operating until 1950. The Hiawatha No. 1 complex eventually engulfed several smaller mines, including the Anna Mine, North Hiawatha, West Hiawatha, Chatham Mine, Stegmiller, and part of the Wickwire Mine. During that time, the mine shaft was sunk to 2100 feet, making the Hiawatha the deepest mine in the county. The site is probably the best-preserved mine operation site in the county.

The most prominent structure in the complex is the 120-foot tall steel Hiawatha Mine Number One headframe, dating from 1904. It is the oldest surviving headframe in Michigan. The headframe is a stepped configuration, about 50 feet by 30 feet at the base and 10 feet by 10 feet at the top. Corrugated metal siding covers much of the headframe. Most of the headframe load is borne by a 25-foot concrete foundation pier located inside the steel framework. Also included in the complex are four single-story buildings with gable roofs, one stone and theothers frame, built in the early 20th century.

=== Nels A. Holmes Farmstead ===
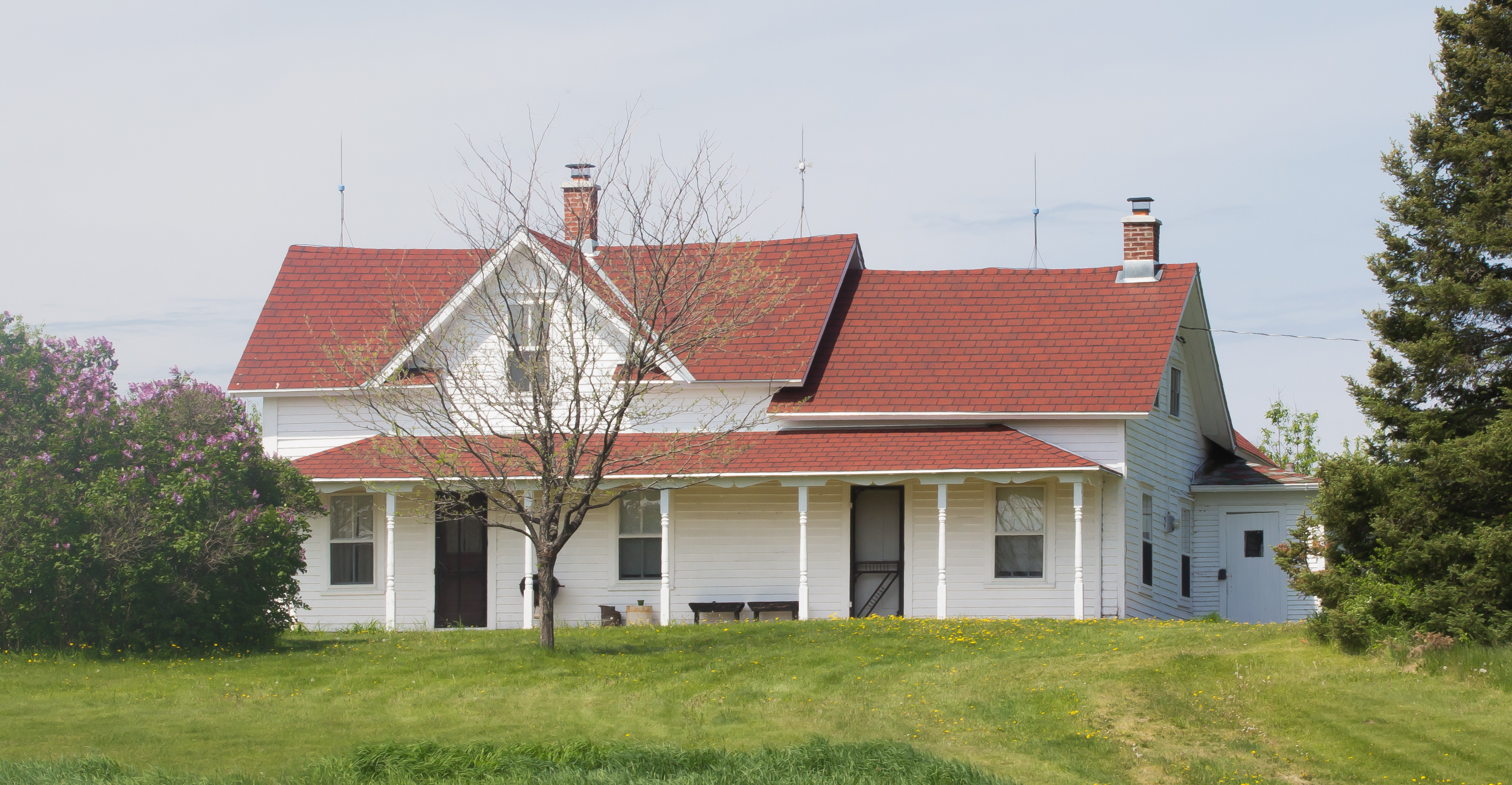

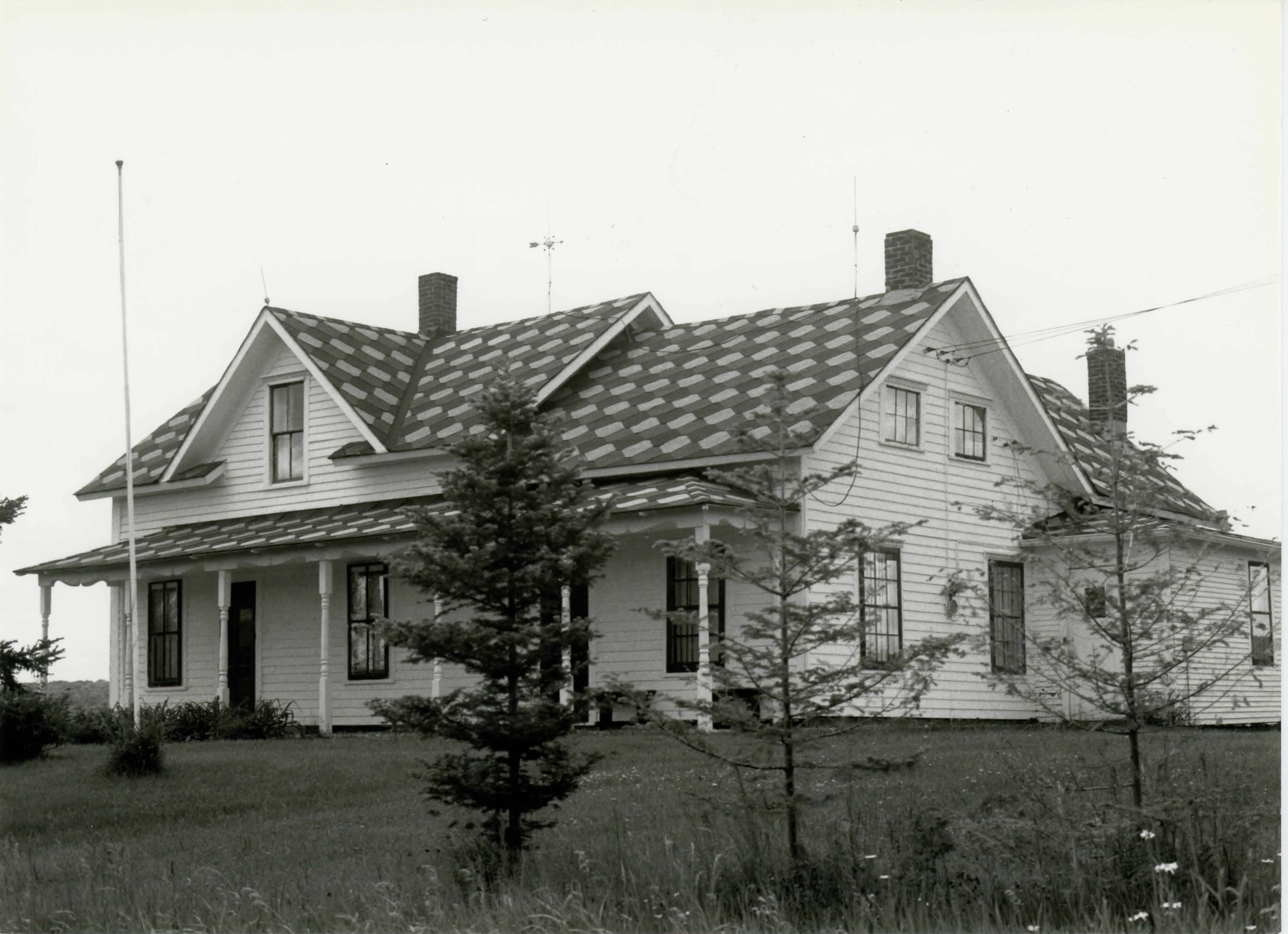

46.050278°N 88.643889°W

The Nels A. Holmes Farmstead, also known as the William Sackerson Farm, is a collection of buildings located at 2614 M-189. In 1884, Nelson Holmes, a native of Sweden who had immigrated to the United States two years previously, homesteaded the land this farmsite sits on. In 1895 Nelson and his wife Minna purchased the forty acre property for $100. Nelson Holmes died in 1932 and passed the property on to his son Herman. Herman operated a logging business, a road contracting business, and served three terms as Iron County Sheriff. When Herman Holmes died in 1941, he passed the farm on to his brother-in-law, William Sackerson. The farm has been in the Holmes and Sackerson family for over 100 years.

The Nelson A. Holmes farmhouse sits on a low open hill near other farm buildings, including a wellshed, chicken coop, and summer kitchen. The farmhouse is a 1 1/2-story, timber-framed house with clapboard siding on a fieldstone foundation. It was constructed in 1890 around an 1884 log cabin. The flank-gable roof is covered with asphalt shingles, and a hipped roof front porch covers the front of the house. The windows are still the original double-hung, two-over-two or six-over-six panes, with dentil molding in each lintel. The summer kitchen and the chicken coop are both constructed of dovetailed logs with wooden boarding at the gable ends. The wellshed features a jerkinhead roof with exposed rafters, and is covered with narrow horizontal boards.

=== House at 902 Selden Road ===
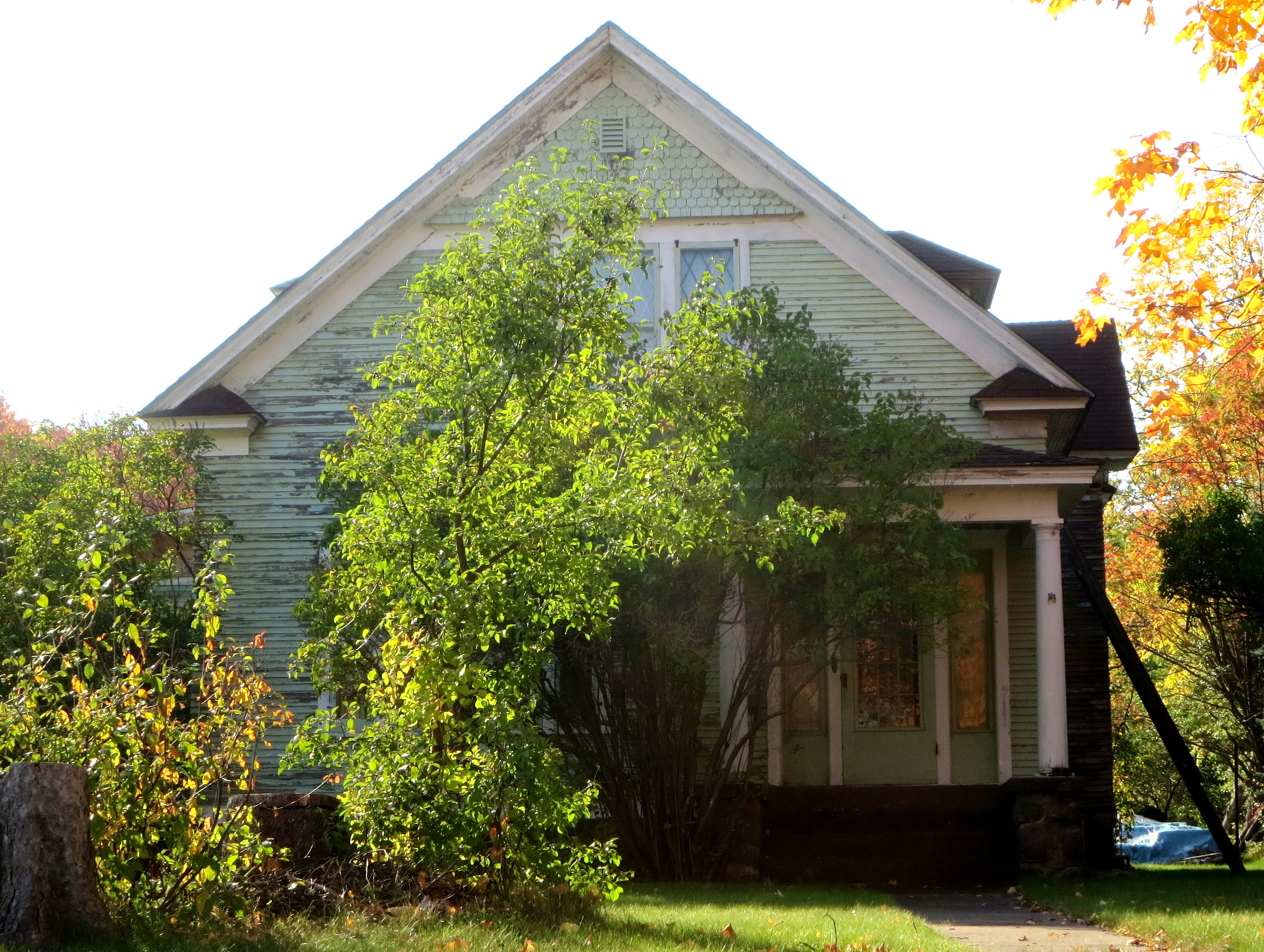

46.080278°N 88.643333°W

The House at 902 Selden Road is low, 1 1/2-story, gable-roofed, early 20th-century house. The house was constructed for the Youngstown Mines Corporation, presumably for the families of administrative or supervisory employees. It is sided with clapboard and Queen Anne circle-butt shingling on the gable. Details include a Tuscan-column porch, horizontal return cornices, and a lozenge pattern upper sash in the gable window. The house is significant because if its fine architectural quality and state of preservation.

=== Louis Levine House ===
46.084444°N 88.643056°W

The Louis Levine House is a two-story frame house located at 502 Selden Road. It was built c. 1922–25, with one of the earliest owners being Louis Levine. The house is a distinctive Colonial structure, with a veranda with Tuscan running across the front, clapboard and shingle siding, and a cobblestone foundation.

=== John S. McLean House ===
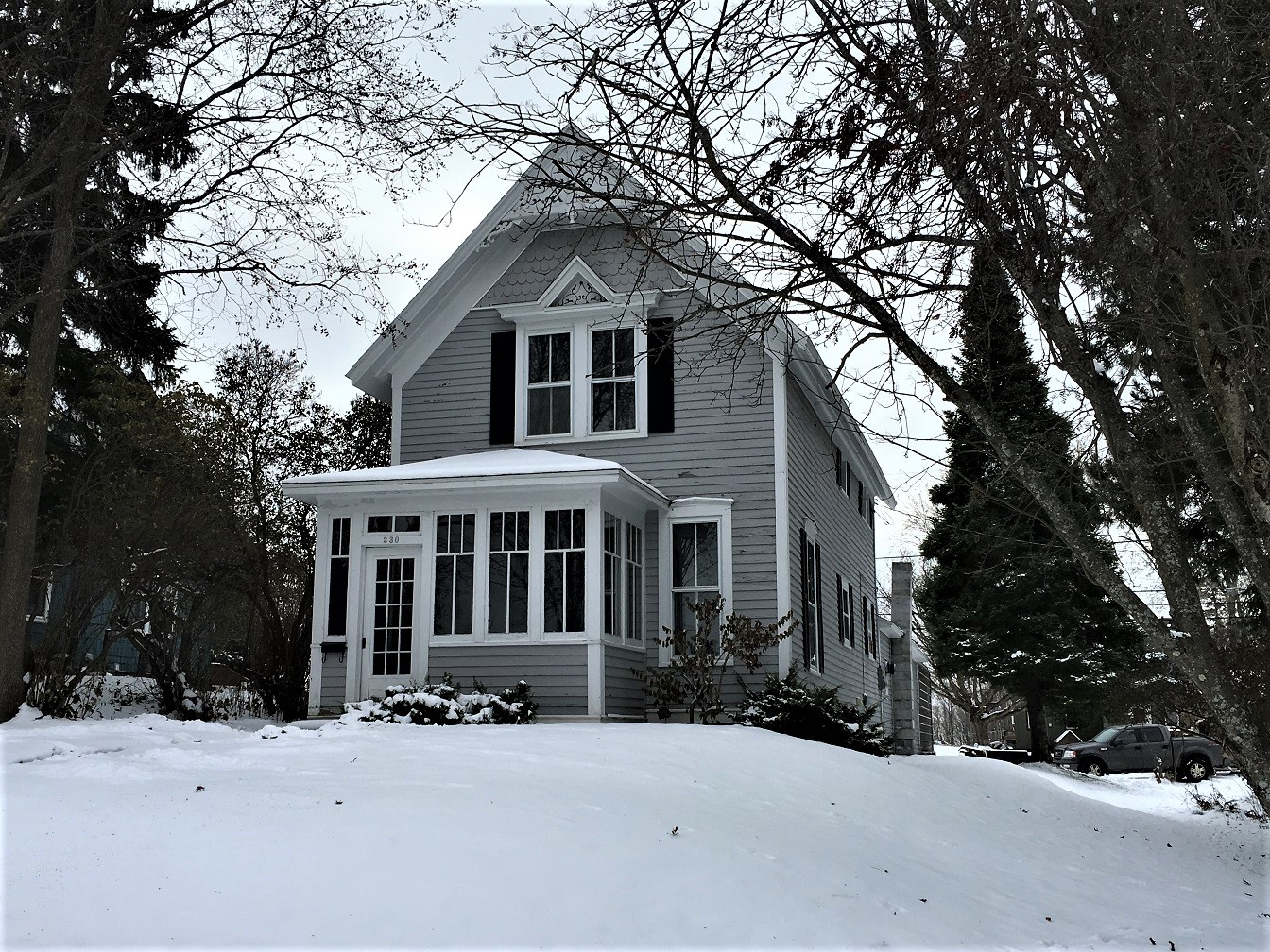

46.084167°N 88.631389°W

The John S. McLean House is a two-story frame house located at 230 Fourth Street (now 230 Diamond Street). The house was constructed by the Stambaugh Company in approximately 1882 for John McLean, a skilled blacksmith. It is one of several built around the same time by the company to house key personnel in the iron mining industry. McLean purchased the property from the Stambaugh Company in 1893, and continued to own it until 1915. The house has a gable roof and clapboard siding with a glassed-in front porch. It is notable for the Eastlake ornamentation in the front gable and above the second-story window; such ornamentation is rare in Iron County.

=== Lafayette McQuown House ===
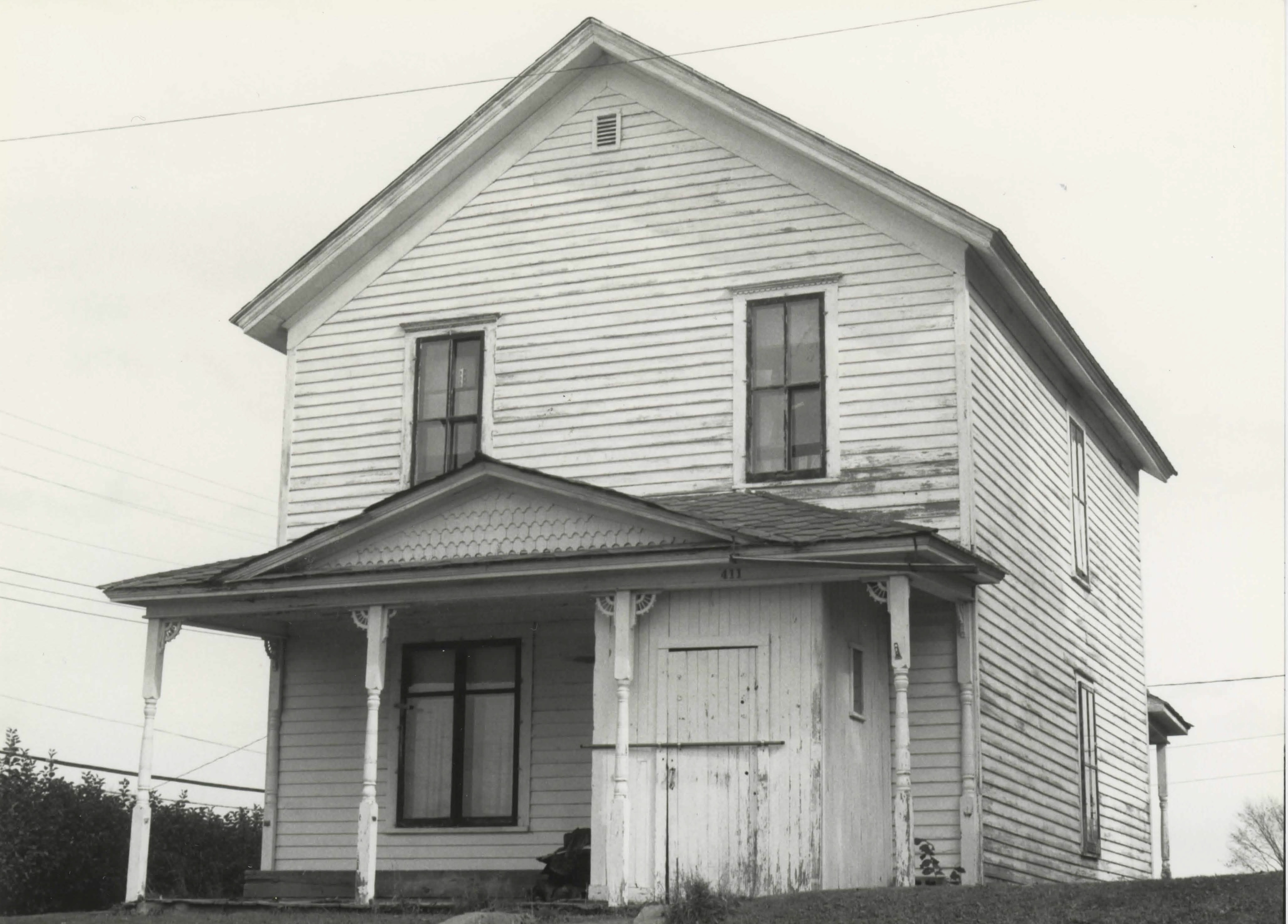

46.084722°N 88.631111°W

The Lafayette McQuown House is a simple frame house located at 411 Adams Street. It was built in about 1895 for Lafayette McQuown, an early resident of Stambaugh who assisted William Selden Jr. in surveying the town site in 1882. McQuown served as village president in 1893-94 and as Secretary of the Stambaugh Township Board of Education for eighteen years. He was employed by the Oliver Mining Company as head timekeeper from 1899 to 1926. It is likely that McQuown never lived in this house, but used it as a rental property.

The Lafayette McQuown House is significant as a typical example of a late 19th-century miner's residence in good condition. The two-story, house with a gable roof and clapboard siding in little altered from its original appearance. It has a Queen Anne front porch with lathe-turned supports and an enclosed entranceway.

=== Charles Stolberg House ===
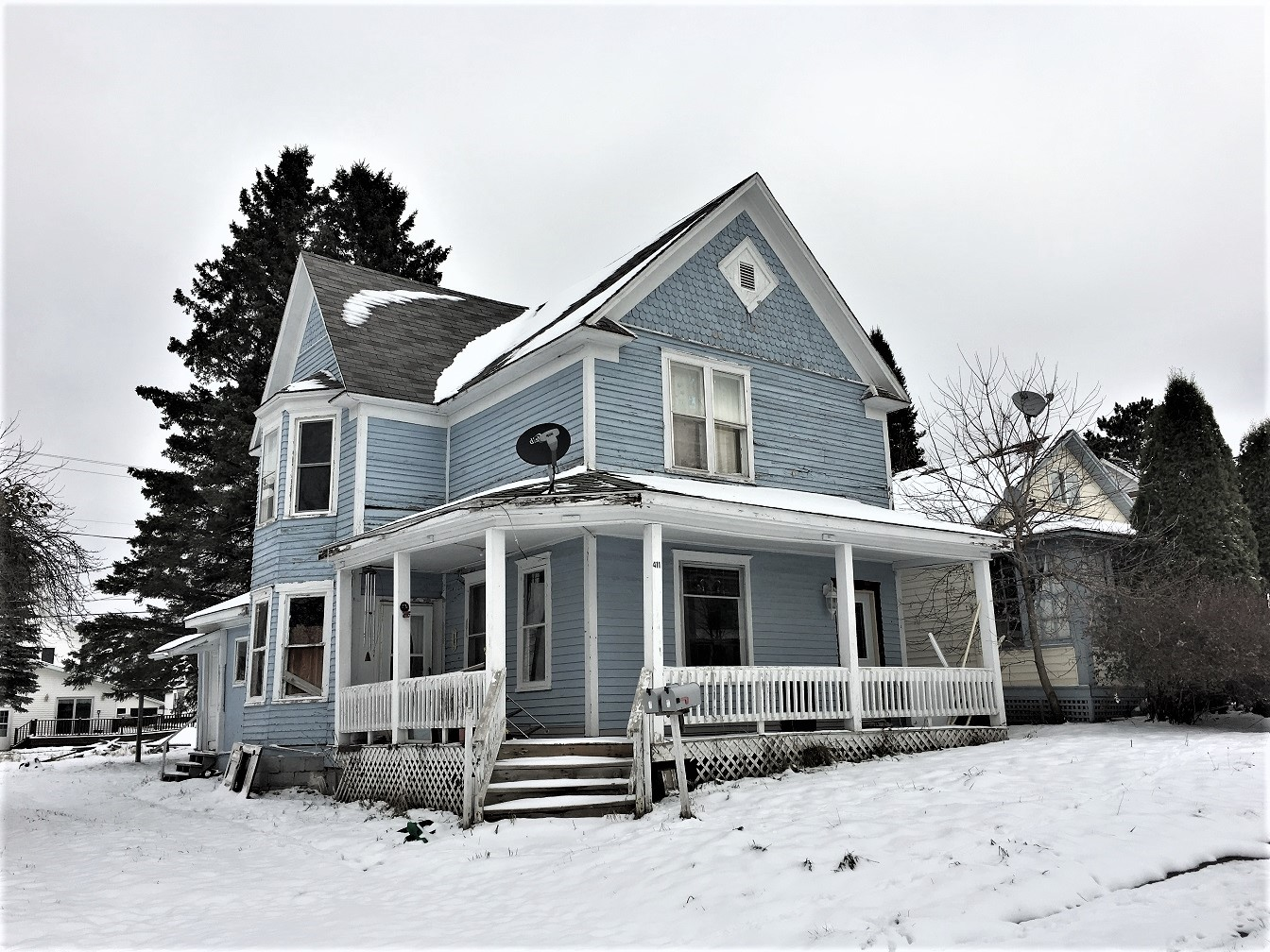

46.085556°N 88.630278°W

The Charles Stolberg House is a two-story frame house located at 411 Third Street (now 411 Cherry Street). It was built in 1909 for Charles Stolberg, one of the first residents of Stambaugh. Stolberg worked as a diamond driller and pumpman in local mines for 48 years. The Stolberg family lived in this house from 1909 to 1915.

The house is significant as one of the most well-preserved Queen Anne structures in Stambaugh. It is a two-story, cross-gable house with clapboard siding, patterned shingling in the gables, stained glass transom windows, and a wraparound front porch with Tuscan columns.

=== John Swanson House ===
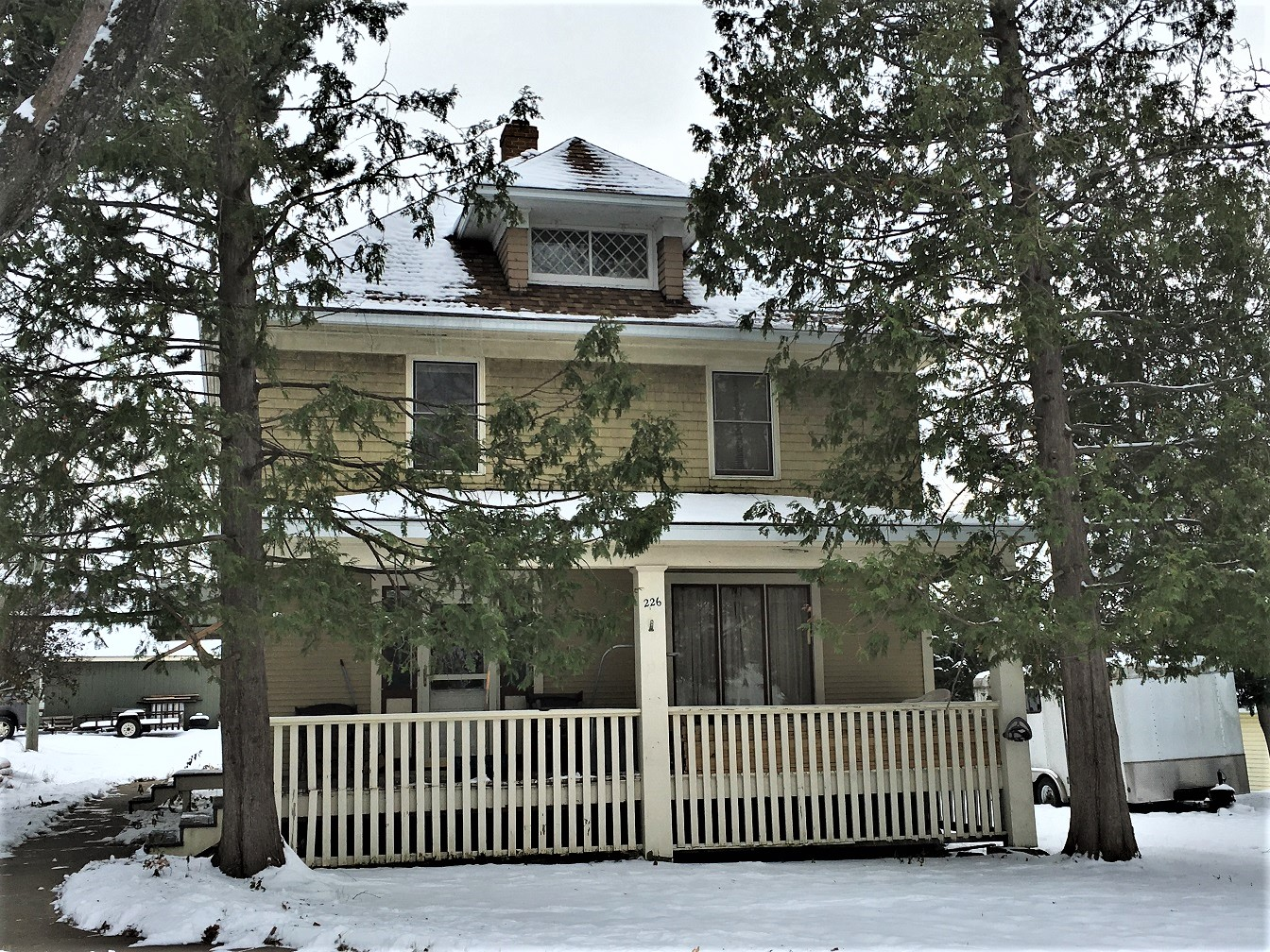

46.084167°N 88.631667°W

The John Swanson House is a two-story frame house located at 226 Fourth Street (now 226 Diamond Street). It was built in 1913 for John Swanson, who started the Consolidated Mercantile Store in about 1909 with his partner John Olson. The Swanson House is a two-story frame, hipped roof, American foursquare structure with a full-length front porch and attic dormer. It is sided with narrow clapboard on the first floor and wood shingles on the second.

== Mineral Hills ==
In the earlier stages of iron mining in Iron County, it was thought that iron ore existed only within the river valley. However, in 1905 homesteader William James found iron ore in the hills north of Iron River. He promptly opened a mine, and in 1906 the Mineral Hills Mining Company bought the James Mine. They constructed 12 frame houses near the site. Over the next 10 years five more mines opened in the area, each constructing houses near their own locations. In 1919, all six mine locations were collectively incorporated as the village of Mineral Hills. A village hall was built in 1921, but due to the proximity of Iron River, commercial businesses never developed. In 2000, Mineral Hills and Stambaugh were merged into the nearby Iron River.

There is one historic district and one standalone structure from what once was Mineral Hills included in this MRA. They are summarized as follows:

=== James Mine Historic District ===
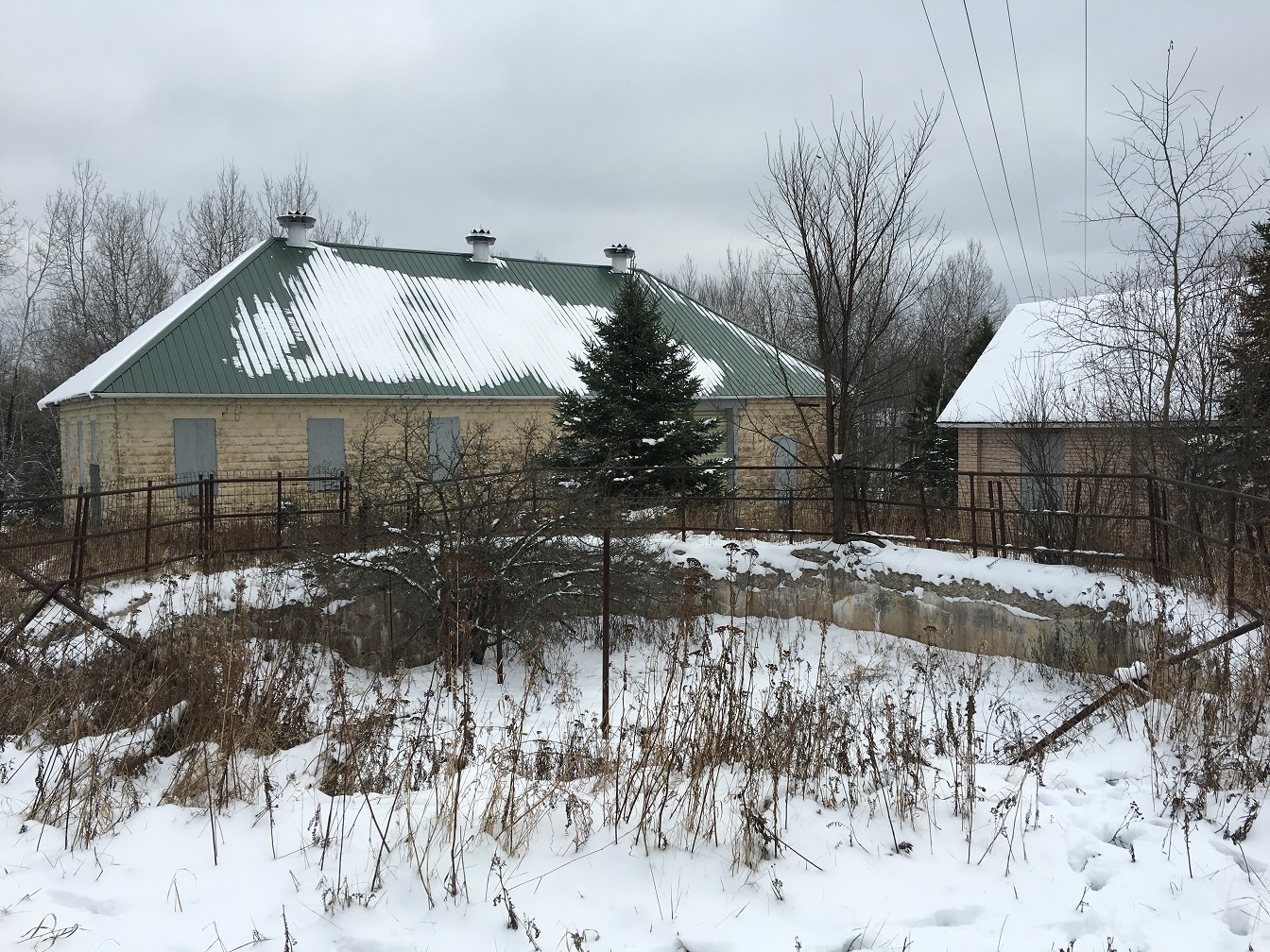

46.113889°N 88.6425°W

The James Mine Historic District (once known as the Osana Mine) is a collection of buildings located at the intersection of Mineral Avenue and Mower Street. The James Mine was operated by the Mineral Hills Mining Company from its opening in 1906 (as the "Osana Mine") until 1925, after which the site was acquired by the James Mining Company. The James Mine operated until 1950, by which time it had five main levels reaching to a depth of 860 feet. The structures in the district were built between 1906 and 1921 by the Mineral Hills Mining Company for its miners and mine officials. The structures include a hipped roof dry house, a hipped roof pump house, a gable roof blacksmith shop, and a gable roof engine house. The district also incorporates the surrounding residential community, including the Mineral Hills Village Hall and houses with garages and other outbuildings. The James Mine Historic District is significant as a well-preserved example of a mining company settlement.

=== Spies Boardinghouse ===
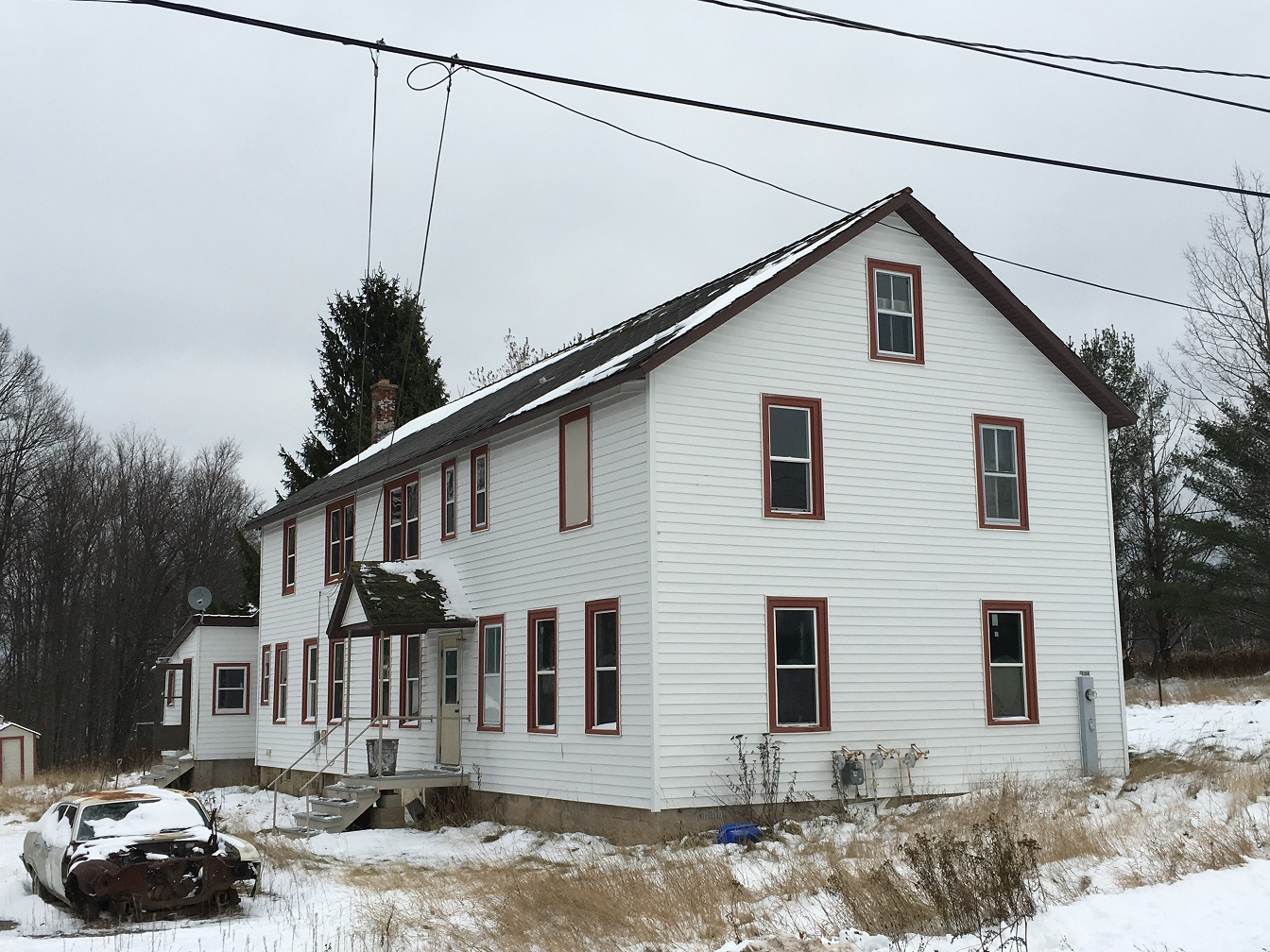

46.109444°N 88.631944°W

The Spies Boardinghouse is a residential building located at 700 Grant Street. It is a long, two-story rectangular structure with clapboard siding, a gable-roof, and a one-story shed at one end. The building was constructed in 1909 by James Johnson for the Cleveland Cliffs Iron Company, owners of the nearby Spies Mine. The Spies Boarding House housed unmarried miners in ten second-floor bedrooms. The first floor contained a dining room, kitchen, storage rooms, and living quarters for the manager. In the early 1930s, Cleveland Cliffs converted the Spies Boarding House into four apartments

== Caspian ==
After the effects of the Panic of 1893 had subsided, exploration for iron ore resumed in the area around Iron River. Southeast of Iron River, five mines opened in the first decade of the 20th century, starting with the Baltic Mine in 1900. A small village named "Palatka" was platted in the area in 1901. These mines brought miners to the area, and starting in 1904, the mining companies constructed houses for their workers. A small commercial district sprang up to service the miners; by 1908 there were seven businesses and a post office located there. A settlement designated "Caspian" was platted near the business district the same year; in 1909 "New Caspian" was platted nearby. Eventually the small settlements merged; the resulting community was known by a variety of names, but by 1913 the entire area was designated "Caspian," after the most productive of the surrounding mines.

By 1917, nearly 2000 people lived in Caspian, and in 1918 it was incorporated as a village. Water and sewage systems were installed over the next few years, and a village hall was built in 1923. Caspian was primarily settled by Italians, as evidenced by the large presences of the order of the Duca Degi Abruzzl, a fraternal order founded In 1909. However, miners of a dozen other nationalities, including Finns and Poles, also settled in Caspian.

As with other communities in Iron County, the peak of prosperity in Caspian's history were the first three decades of the 20th century. It was incorporated as a city in 1949, just after the mining boom tied to World War II, but declined once the mines were closed. It is currently a quiet community, closely linked to the nearby Iron River.

There are four structures from Caspian included on this MRA. They are summarized as follows:

=== Caspian Community Center ===
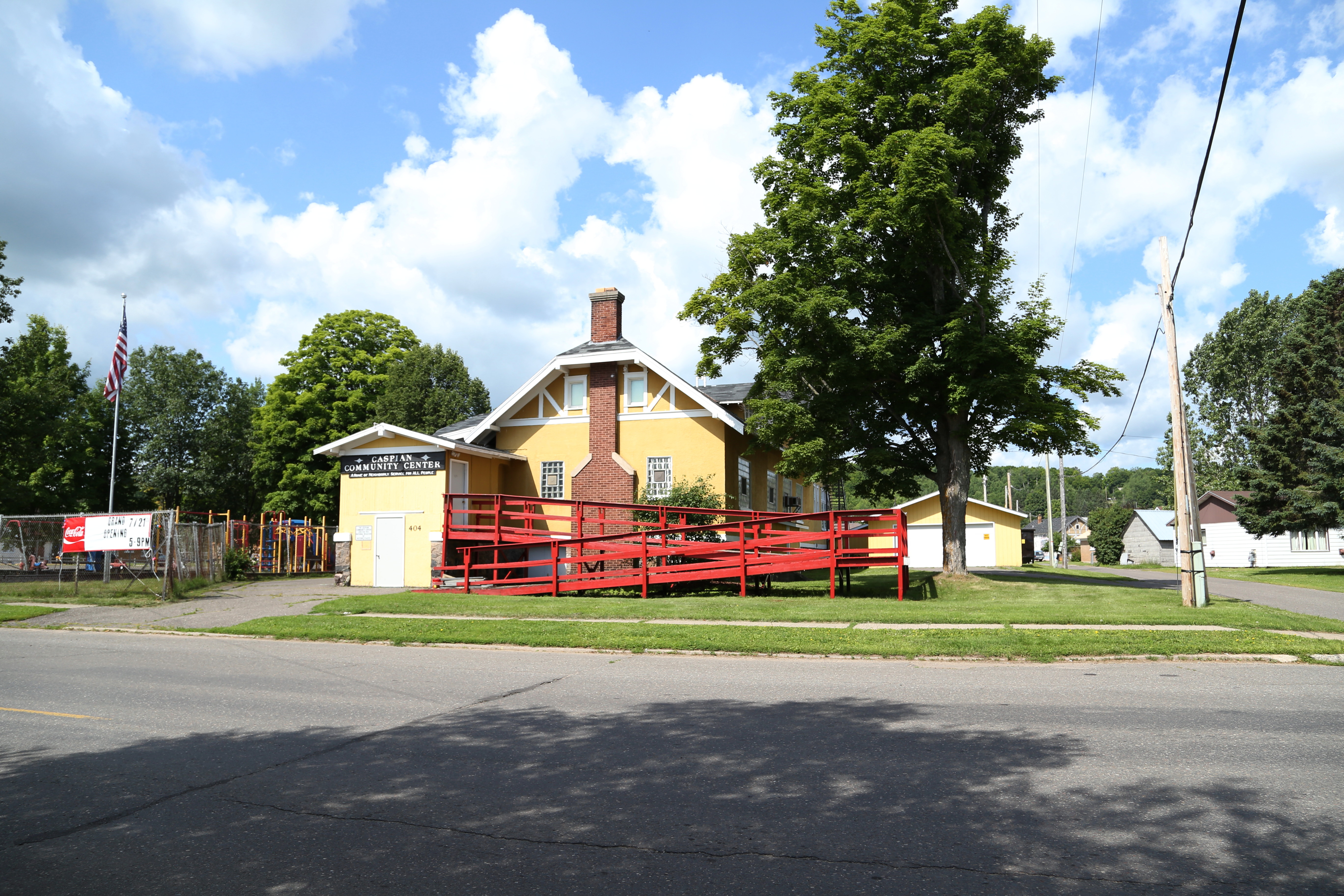

46.061944°N 88.6275°W Demolished

The Caspian Community Center is an educational facility located at 404 Brady Avenue. It was constructed in 1921 by the Presbyterian Board of National Missions in an Arts and Crafts style. It was used as educational facility for immigrant families by the Board of Missions until 1950. It was later purchased by the Caspian Athletic Association, and was used as a community center, offering play areas and meeting rooms for local youth groups until its demolition in 2022.

The building was a large two-story rectangular structure covered with stucco and half-timbered at the gable ends. Some structural members were exposed, reflecting Arts and Crafts architectural influences. A 1928 addition jutted from one side. It contained a library, club and meeting rooms, a kitchen, and an apartment for the director.

=== Caspian Mine Headframe ===
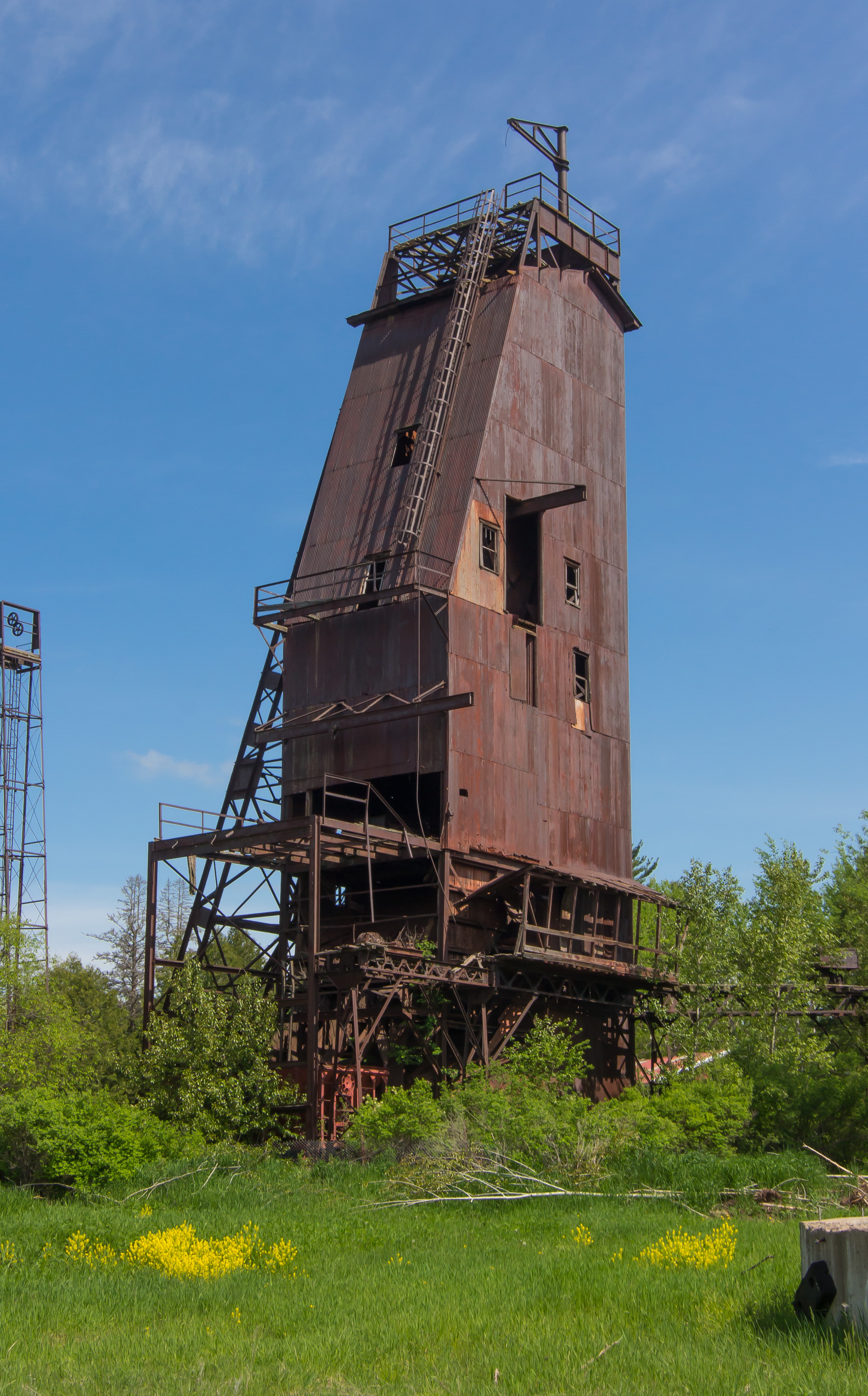

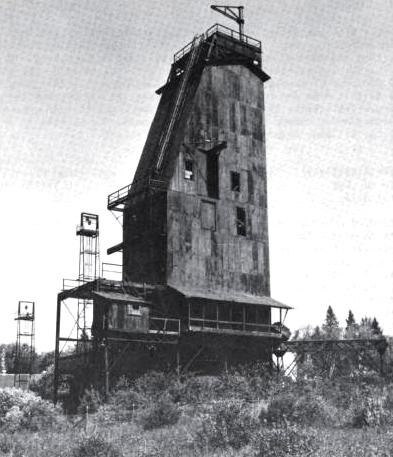

46.067778°N 88.625278°W

The Caspian Mine Headframe is a steel mining building located at north of Caspian Road, in Caspian. The Caspian Mine opened in 1903, the second of three mines opened by the Verona Mining Company. Verona later sold the mine to the Pickands-Mather Company. The original headframe was wooden; the current structure was built as a replacement in 1920. The headframe is a 106 foot high steel-framed structure clad in corrugated steel siding. It is about 25 feet by 10 feet at the base and tapers to about 10 feet by 10 feet at the top. The stanchions constructed to support steel cables leading from the hoisthouse to the headframe are located nearby.

This headframe is significant as the oldest remaining headframe in Iron County. The Caspian Mine was the most productive mine in the county from its opening in 1903 until its closing in 1937. Pickands-Mather Company, the operator of the Caspian, eventually deeded the headframe, engine house, and the surrounding 5.5 acres to the Iron County Historical and Museum Society. The area now serves as the Iron County Historical Museum.

=== Dober Mining Company House ===
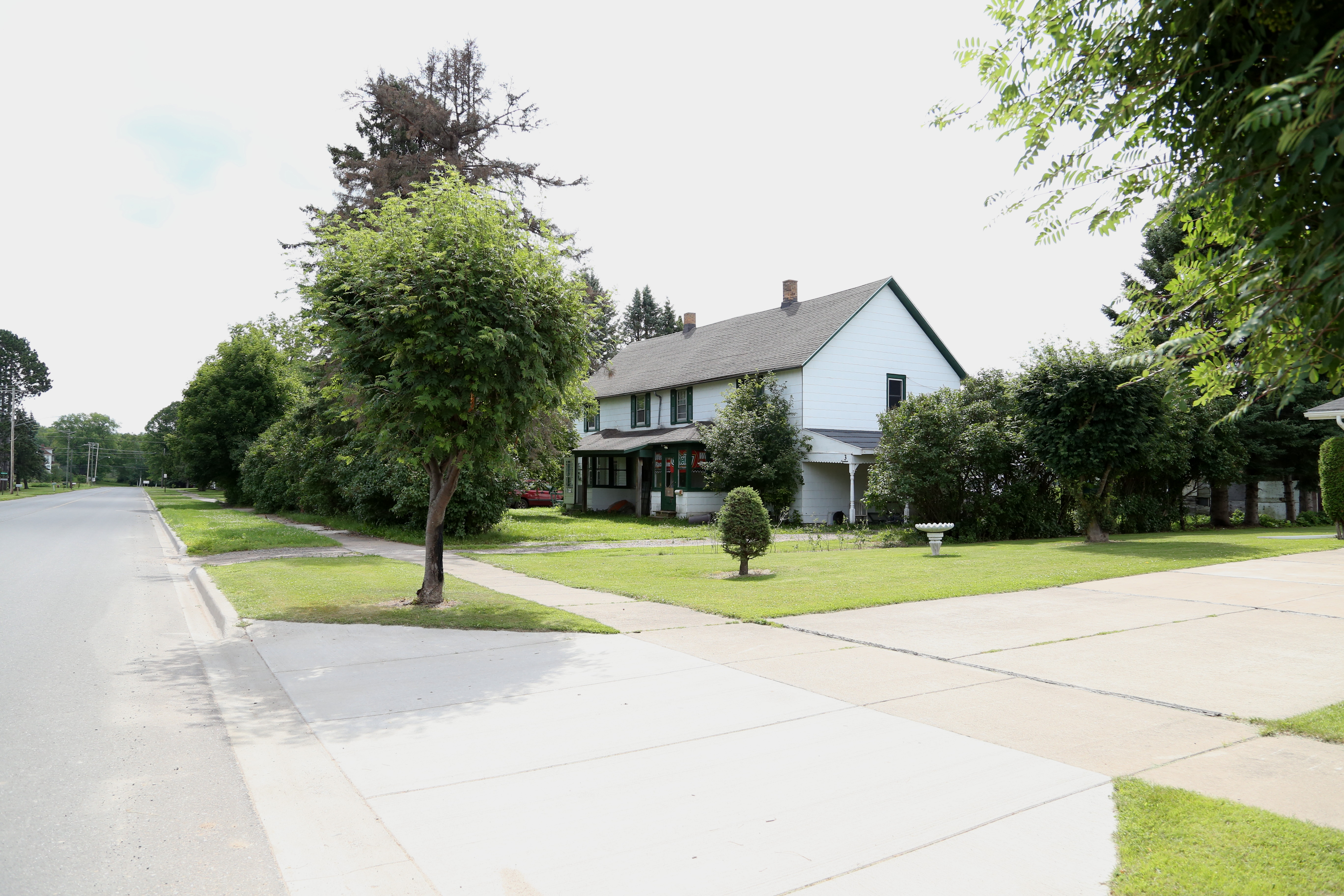

46.072778°N 88.629444°W

The Dober Mining Company House is a four-family house located at 1 Nineteenth Street. The house is one of two remaining that were built around 1910 to house families of the company's miners. The house is a two-story structure, gable-roofed and sided with clapboard, and is divided into four side-by-side units. There are open single-story entrance porches in the front and enclosed porches in the rear.

=== Italian Society Duke of Abruzzi Hall ===
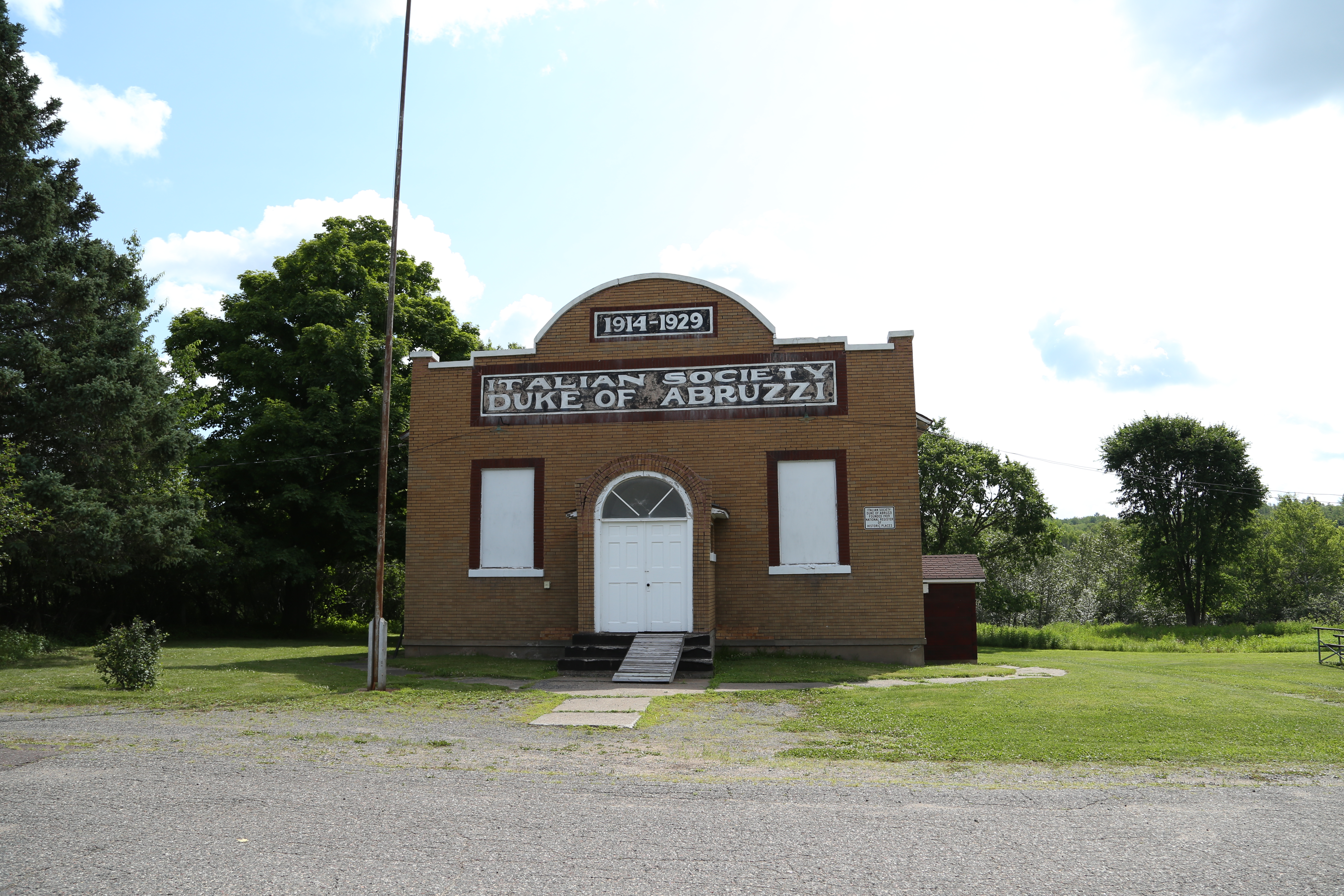

46.061389°N 88.621389°W

The Duca Degli Abruzzi Italian Society was formed on September 26, 1909, by Italian men living in Caspian. The society constructed the Duke of Abruzzi Hall in 1914 as a fraternal lodge hall. It is a rectangular single-story red brick structure with a gable roof and a yellow brick false front located on the east side of McGillis Avenue between Morgan and Sawyer Streets. The yellow brick facade was added to the building in a 1929 remodel.

The entryway is through double doors in a projecting barrel-arch porch with semi-circular fanlight. The building contains a dance hall with its original tin ceiling and a wine-making and sausage-seasoning room; a bocce court is next to the building. As of 2020, a non-profit named Friends of the Duke of Abruzzi was trying to revitalize the hall.

== Alpha ==
Mining began in the area around what is now Alpha in 1882. Several mines opened in subsequent years, including the Mastodon Mine opened by Alfred Breitung. The small community of Mastodon grew alongside, but none of the mines, including the Mastodon, survived the Panic of 1893 and Mastodon withered. However, in 1910, the Pickands-Mather Company began some exploratory operations in the area, and the Nevada Land Company platted a settlement near Pickands-Mather's operations. In 1913 and 1915, two productive mines, the Judson and the Balkan, were started, and miners flocked to the area.

The settlement platted by the Nevada Land Company was unusually well planned for a mining settlement, consisting of a central circle atop a low hill with streets radiating from the center. The settlement grew quickly, and in 1913 a post office was opened, which was simply designated "Alpha." Alpha was incorporated as a village the next year. A school, water tower, and village hall were quickly erected, and businesses immediately moved into the new village.

The area mines, however, closed in the early 1930s, and the village rapidly declined. Alpha is now a primarily residential community, and relies on nearby Crystal Falls for goods and services.

There is one historic district and one standalone structure from Alpha included in this MRA:

=== Alpha Public Buildings Historic Complex ===
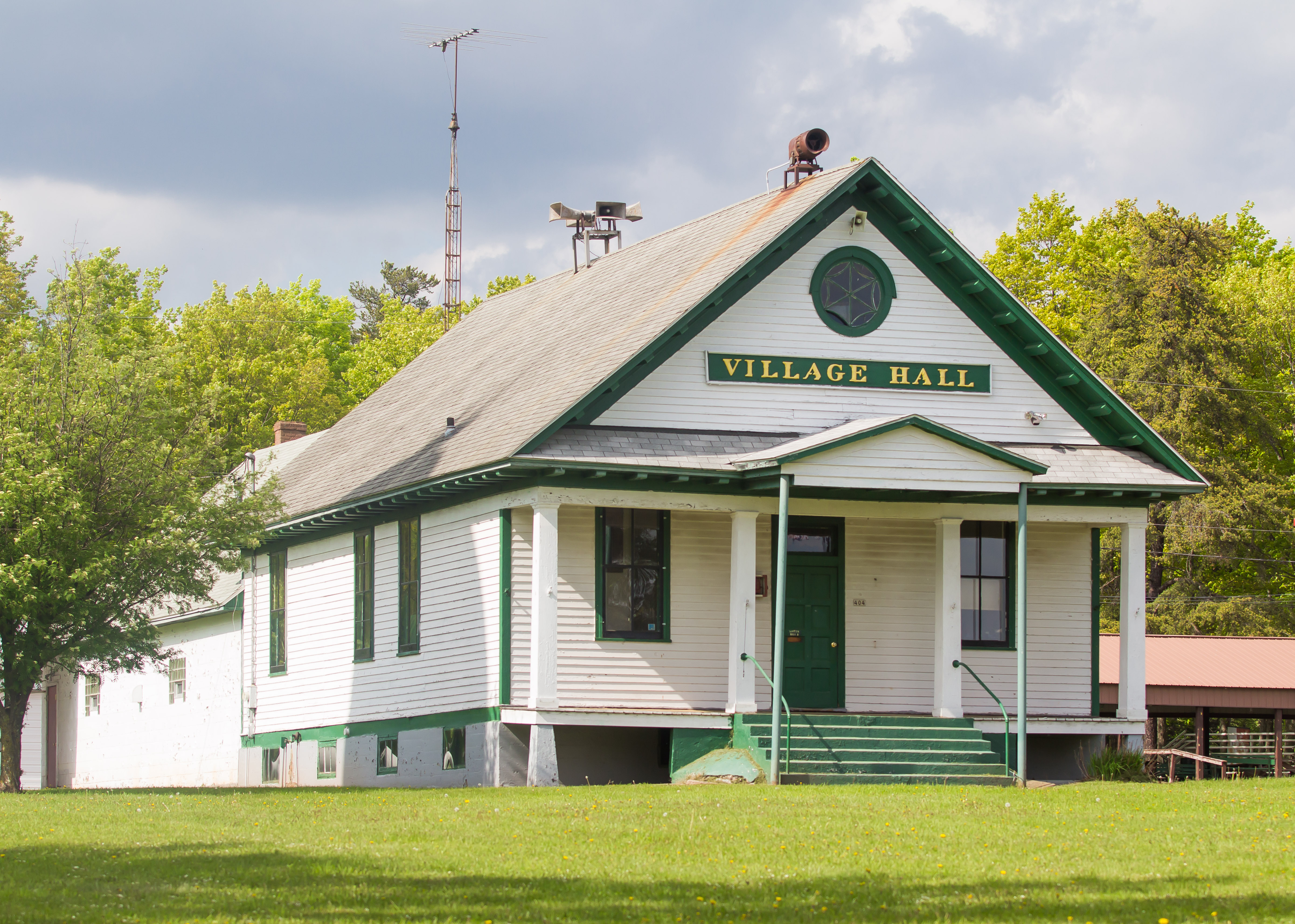

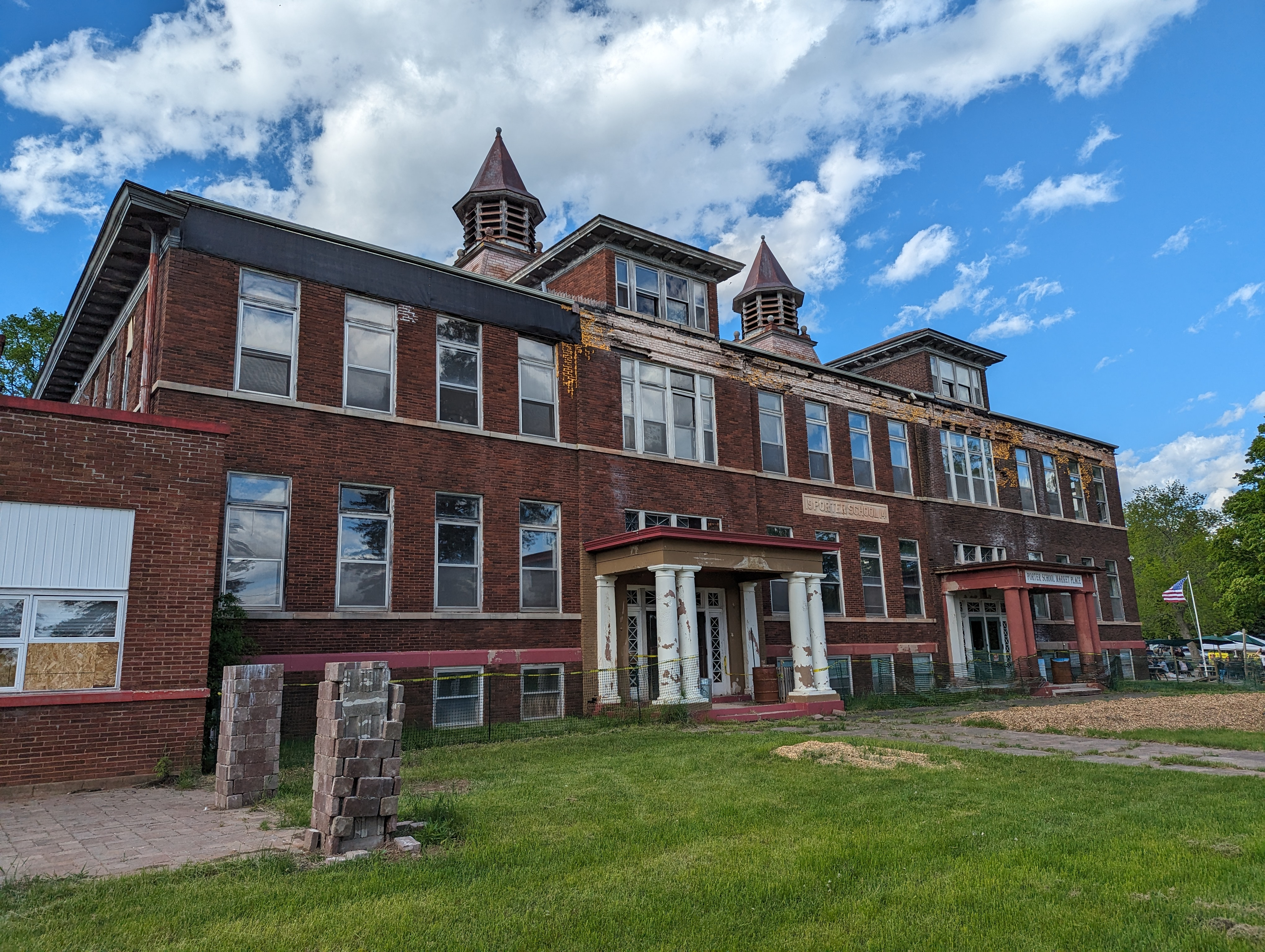
George F. Porter public school in 2024

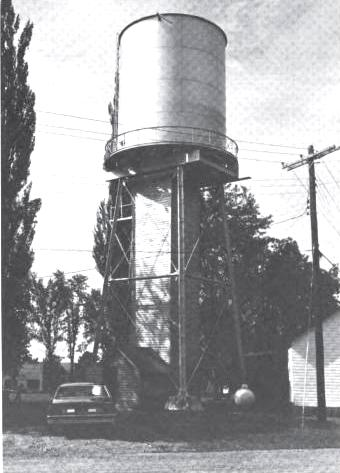

46.046389°N 88.377778°W

The Alpha Public Buildings Historic Complex is a collection of three buildings – the village hall, the George F. Porter public school, and the water tower – prominently located on a single block in the center of Alpha at 404 Main Street. The three buildings, and other significant public structures in Amasa, are built around a traffic circle in the center of town. All three structures on the register were built in 1914 at the peak of Alpha's growth, and are typical of the civic buildings built in the Upper Peninsula in this time period. The Porter School was last used as a school in 1967, and was sold by the village in 2005. As of 2012, it was used as a small business site. The school's former bus garage was converted into a brewery in the 2010s. The water tower was replaced with a modern structure.

The village hall is a single-story, rectangular structure with a gable roof and a three-bay front porch. It is covered with clapboard and has a leaded wheel window in the gable end. A single-story addition of similar construction houses fire-fighting equipment. The water tower consists of a clapboard-covered shaft enclosing the stand pipe. It was originally topped with a small wooden tank; the current steel tank was installed in 1931. The George F. Porter School is a two-story rectangular Classical Revival structure, constructed of brick with a hipped roof. Two entryways with sandstone porches are flanked by Tuscan columns. Above these are two hip-roofed dormers and twin octagonal cupolas. Two single-story wings were added to the school in 1920 and 1929.

=== First National Bank Building ===
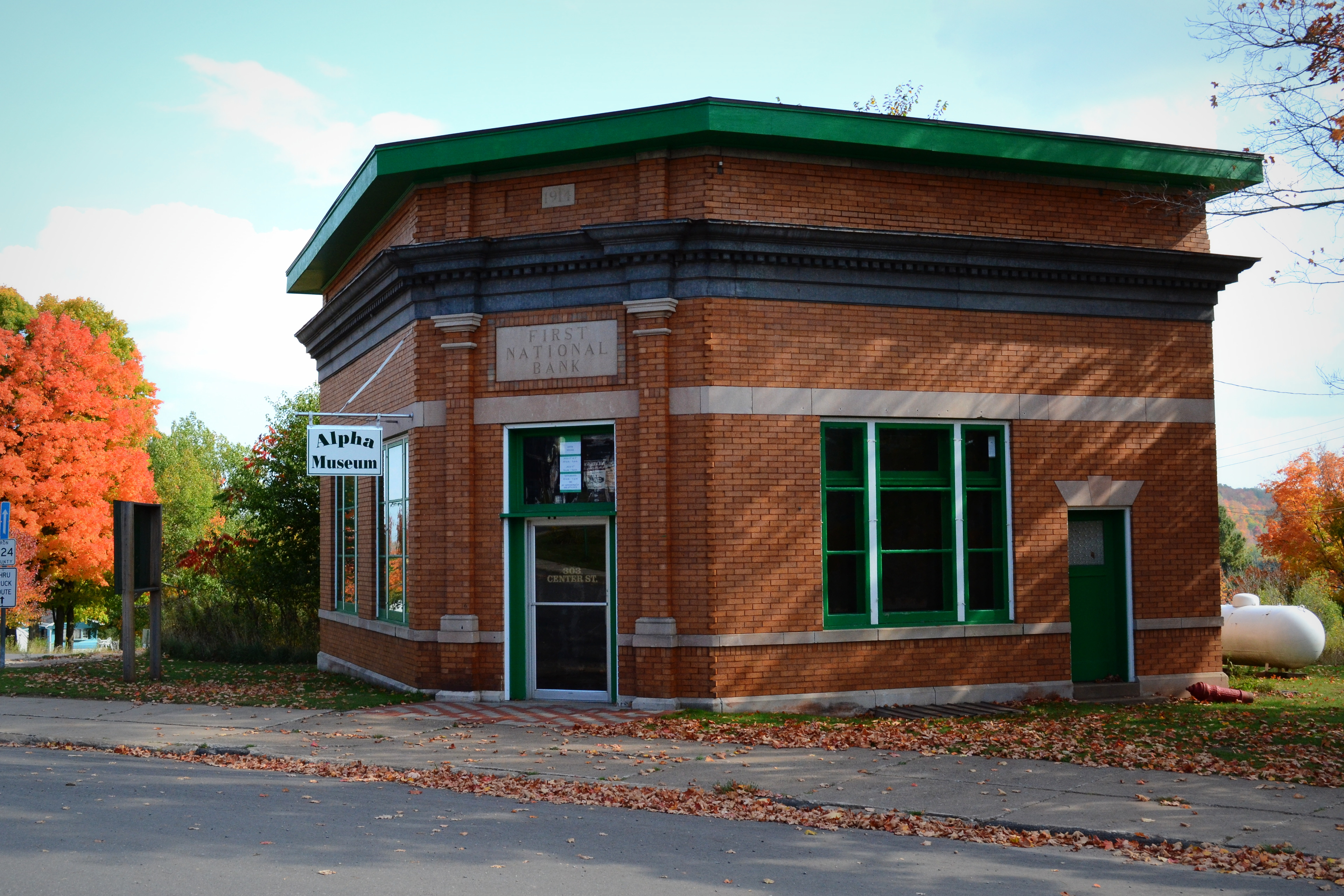

46.04594°N 88.37737°W

The First National Bank Building is a commercial building located at 303 Main Street. The structure was built in 1914, and is a single-story, square-plan, glazed brick building with an angled corner entrance. Brick pilasters flank the entrance and intersect a pressed metal cornice.

== Amasa ==
Iron ore was first discovered along the Hemlock River in 1888 by Matthew Gibson and his son Thoburn. The next year, the Hemlock Mining Company, a subsidiary of the Pickands, Mather Company bought property just west of what is now Amasa. A railroad spur was constructed to the site, and full-scale mining operations began in 1890. A settlement arose near the mine; it was initially dubbed "Hemlock," but in 1892 the name was changed to "Amasa," for Amasa Stone Mather, the son of Pickands, Mather president Samuel Livingston Mather II.

Five more mines were opened in the area in the next few years, and lumbering began in the area, and as a result Amasa grew rapidly. In the early 1890s, a township hall, post office, boarding house, train depot, and several commercial structures were constructed. A fire department water system, and street lighting were all put in place just after the turn of the century. Amasa continued to grow until the 1930s, when local mines began shutting down. The last area mine closed in 1940, and Amasa has changed little since that time, supported primarily by the timber industry.

There are four structures and historic districts from Amasa included in this MRA. They are summarized as follows:

=== Amasa Historic Business District ===
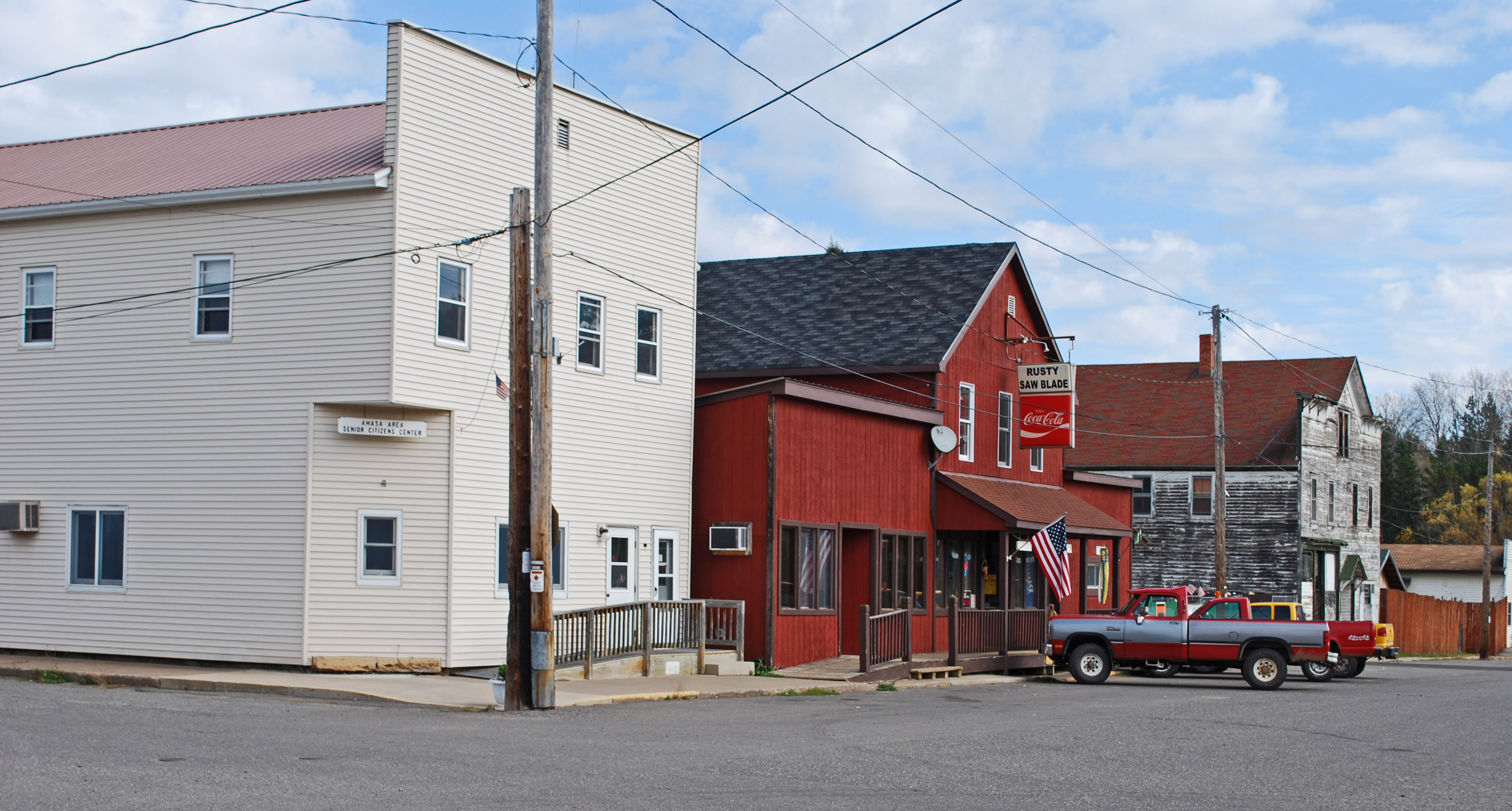

46.232778°N 88.448333°W

The Amasa Historic Business District is located along the 100, 200, and 300 blocks of Pine Street, and contains structures primarily built between 1890 and 1920. The buildings in this district are significant as well-preserved examples of historically and architecturally important buildings in the business center of a mining and lumbering town. The district includes the township hall, a railroad depot, a church, four bars, a senior citizen's center, a lumber company office, three commercial structures, and one single-family residence.

The earliest structures in the district are the Blomquist Boarding House (built in 1892), a hotel (c. 1892), and the Amasa Depot (1893). The Grace United Methodist Church (1905) is a simple Gothic frame structure with a square belfry. Most of the commercial structures are long, narrow, two-story frame buildings with gable roofs and false fronts. One exception is the Hematite Mercantile Building, a single-story brick building trimmed with sandstone. After local mines closed, growth in Amasa halted, and the historic district remains as it was in the early 20th century.

More images of Amasa
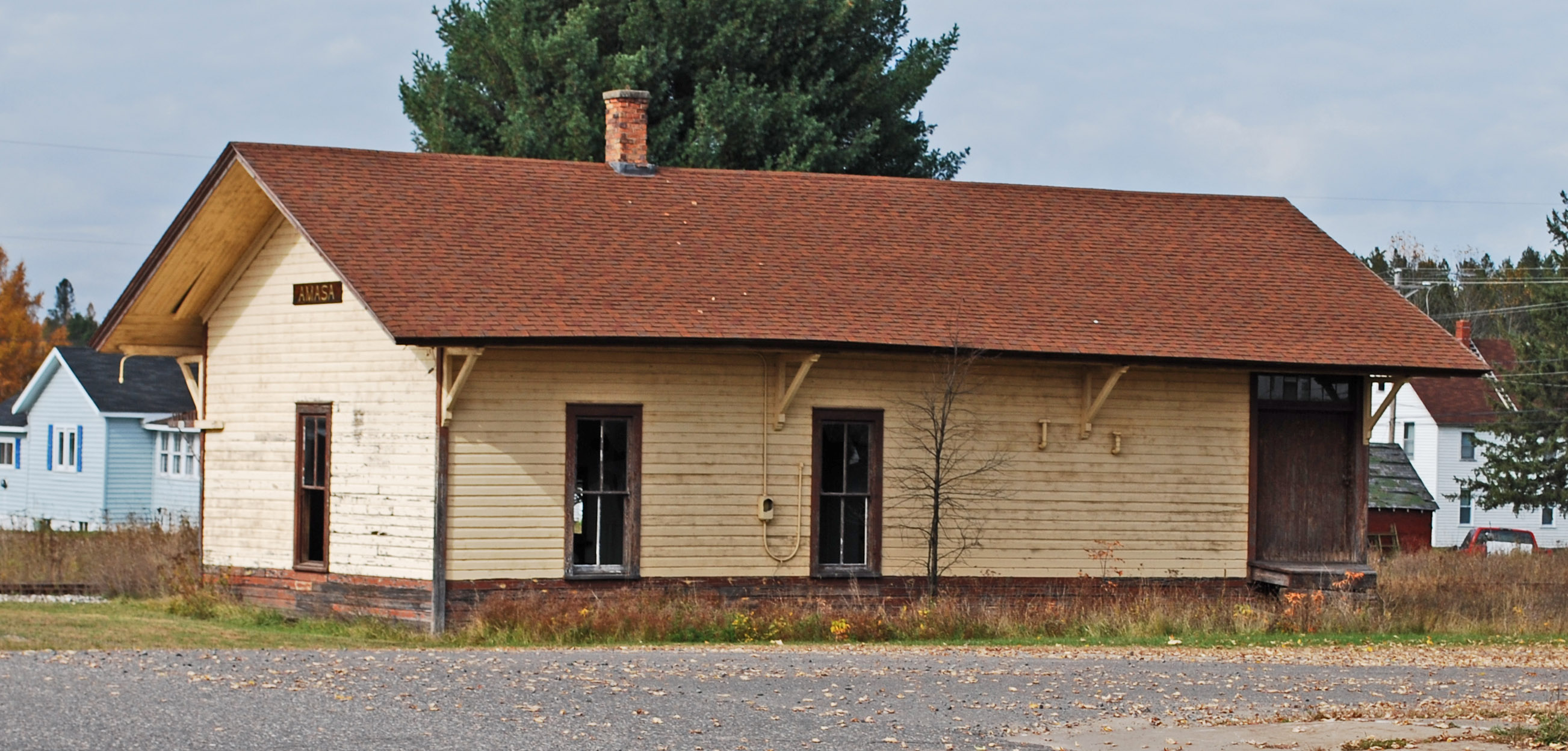
Amasa Depot

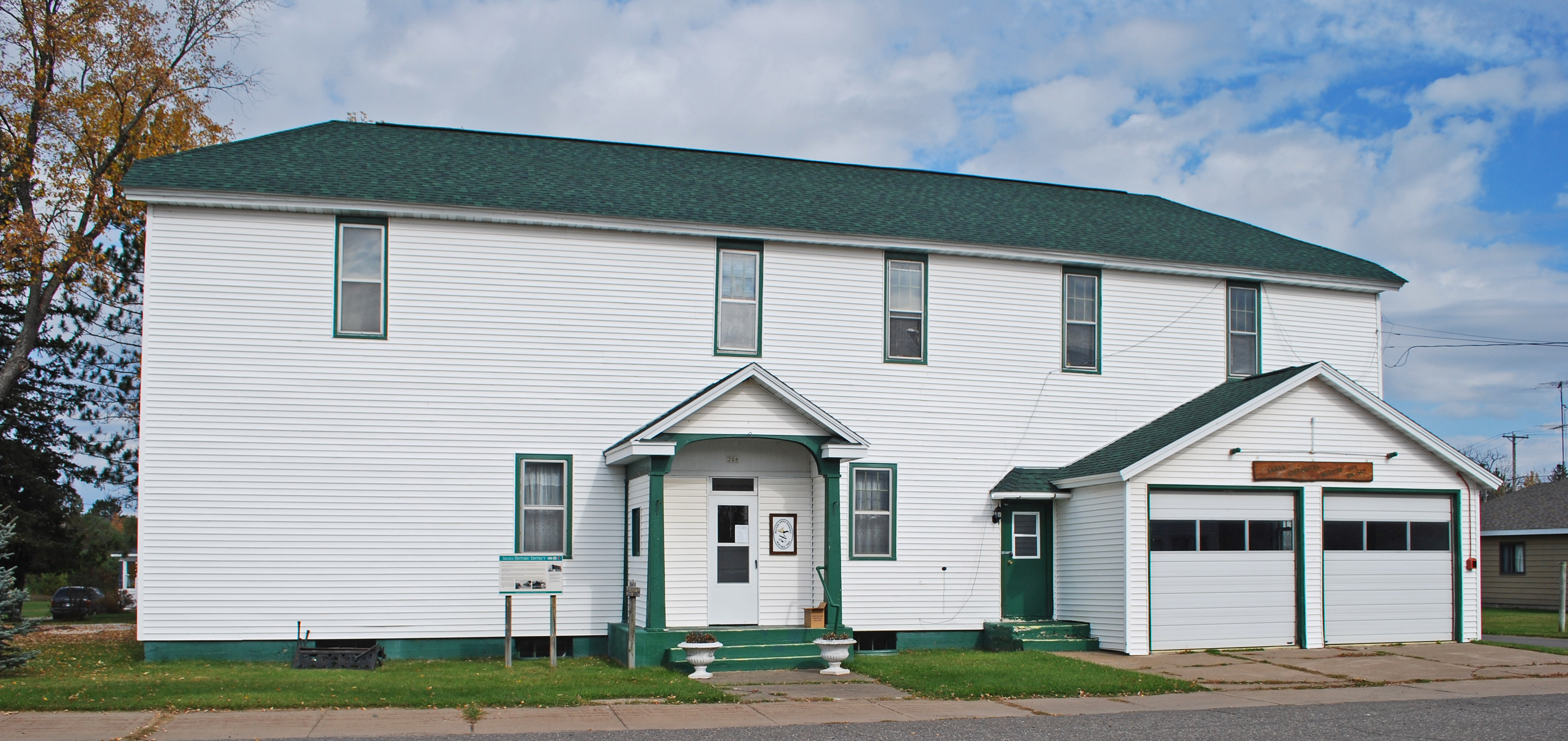
Amasa City Hall (now Historic Museum)

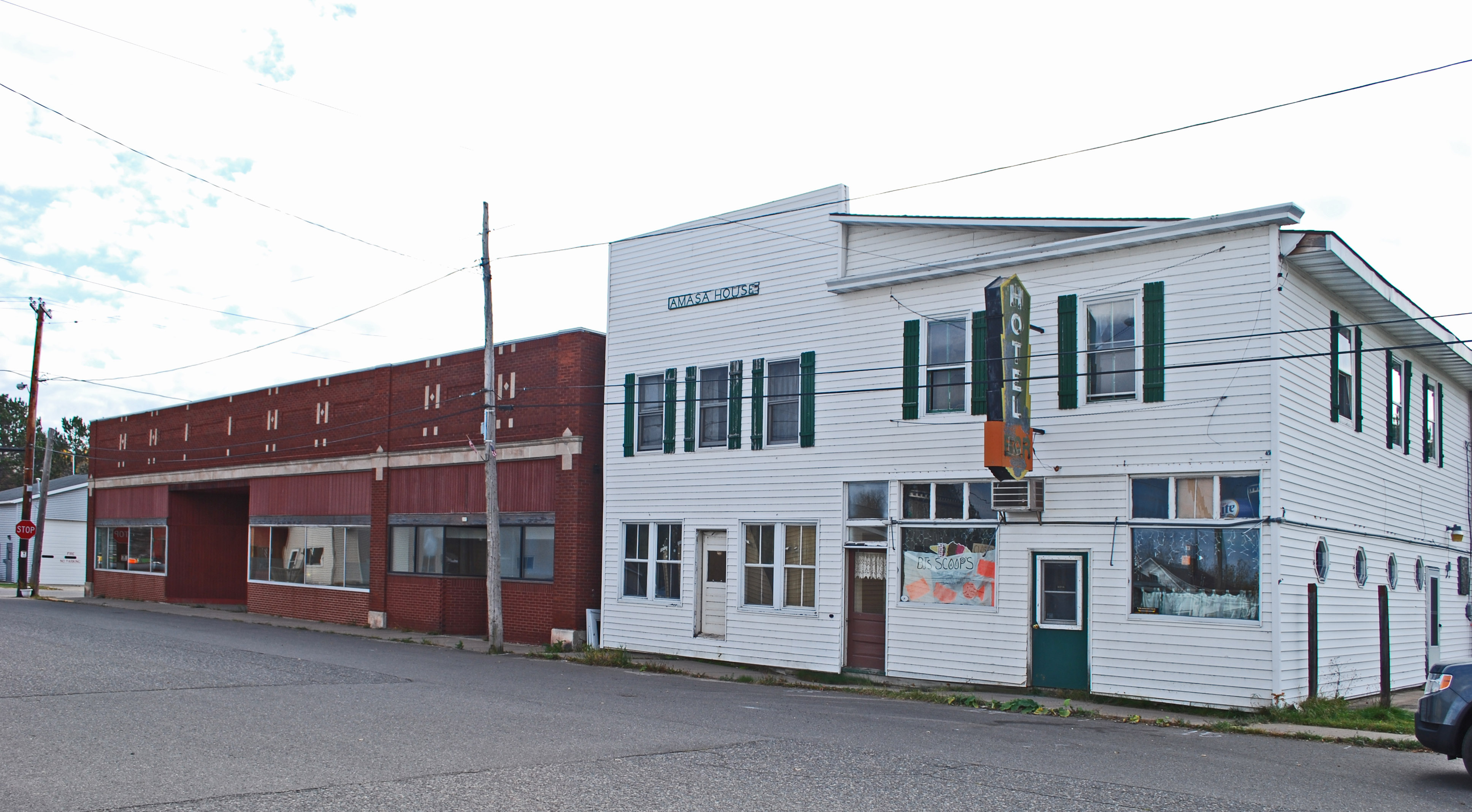
Commercial buildings

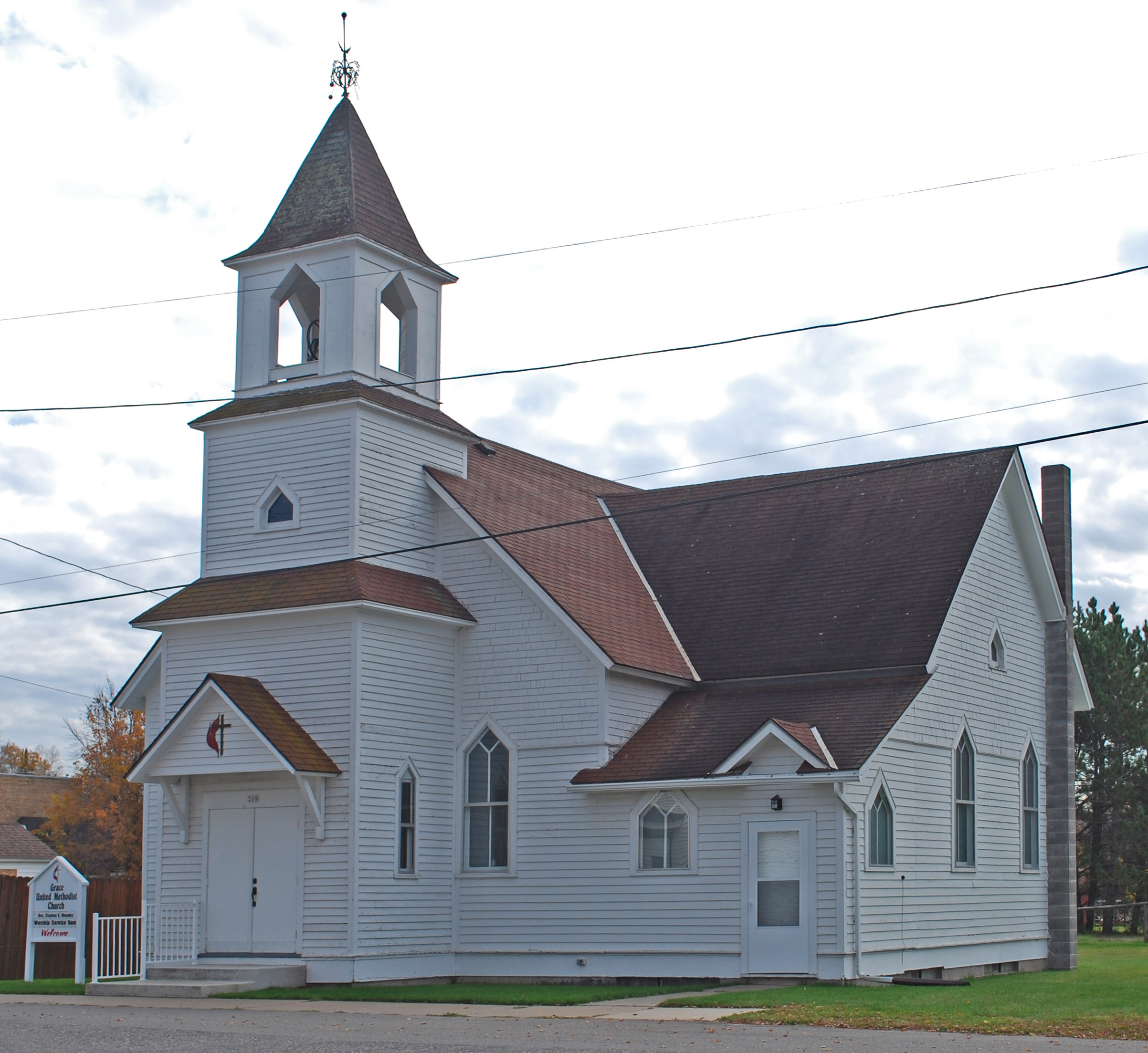
Grace United Methodist Church

=== Joseph Bowers House ===
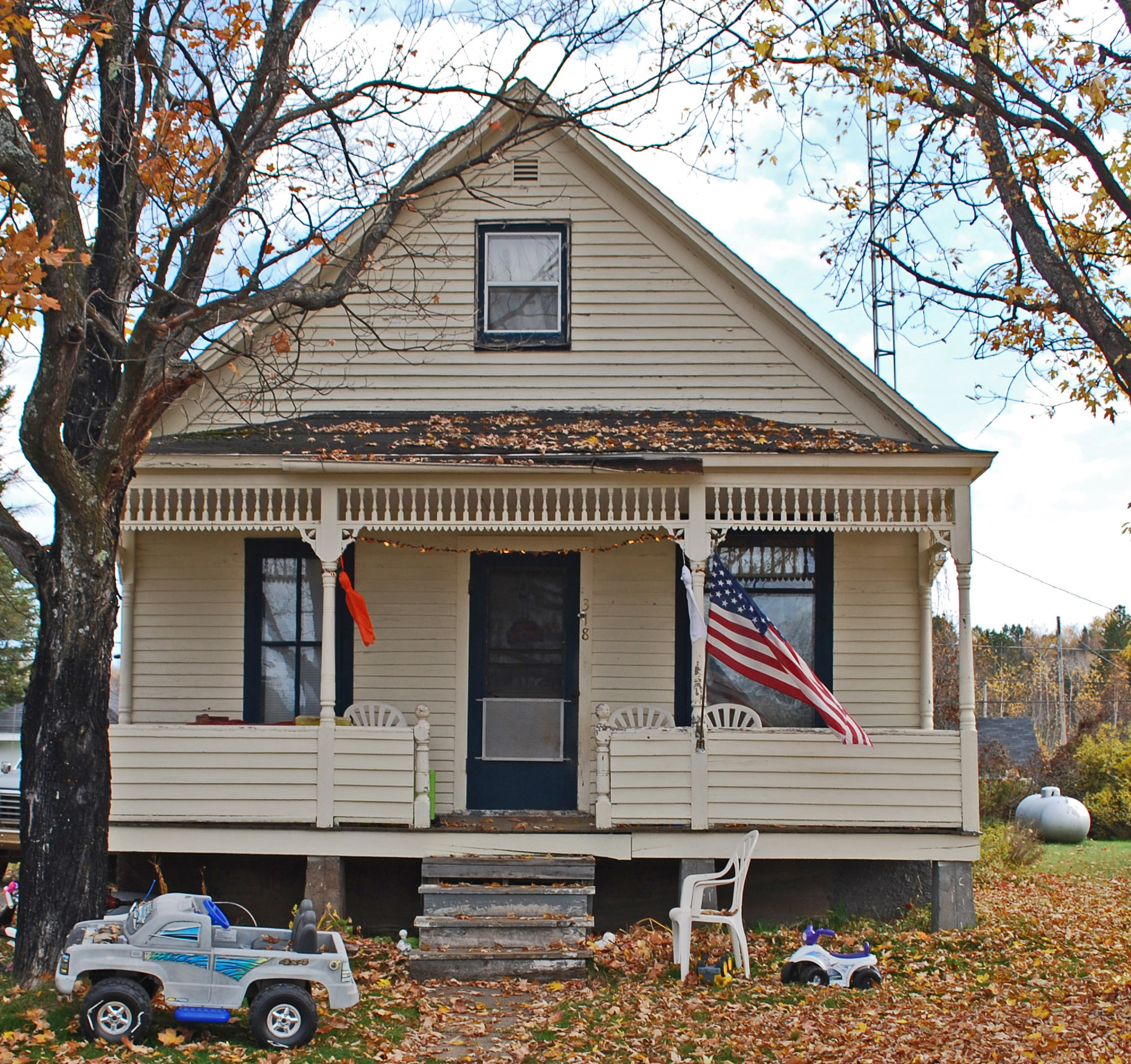

46.234722°N 88.449167°W

The Joseph Bowers House is a 1 1/2-story frame house located at 318 Hemlock Avenue. It is sided with clapboard and has a gable roof. A wide roofed front porch features turned columns and ornamental bracketry beneath the eaves. The house was constructed in 1901, and is significant as a well-preserved example of typical miners housing constructed at the time.

=== Jacob Jacobson House ===
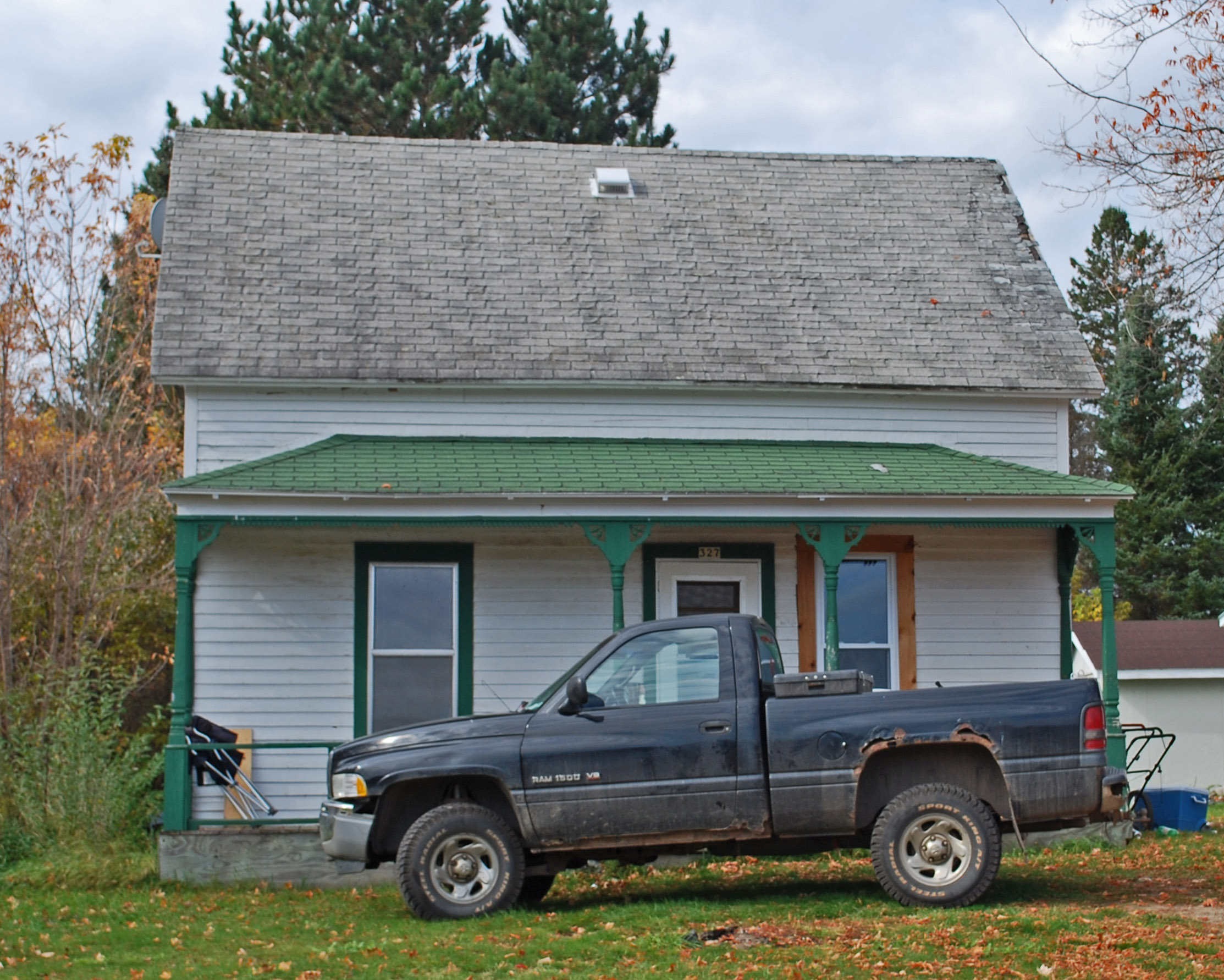

46.235278°N 88.448889°W

The Jacob Jacobson House is a frame located at 327 Maple Avenue. The house was apparently built by carpenter Jacob Jacobson in 1902 as his own residence. It is a 1 1/2-story rectangular frame structure with a gable roof and clad in clapboards. A hipped roof porch with squared and turned columns runs the full length of the house, and a lean-to addition is located in the rear. The house is a particularly well preserved, typical example of residential architecture dating Amasa's developing years.

=== Park City Historic District ===
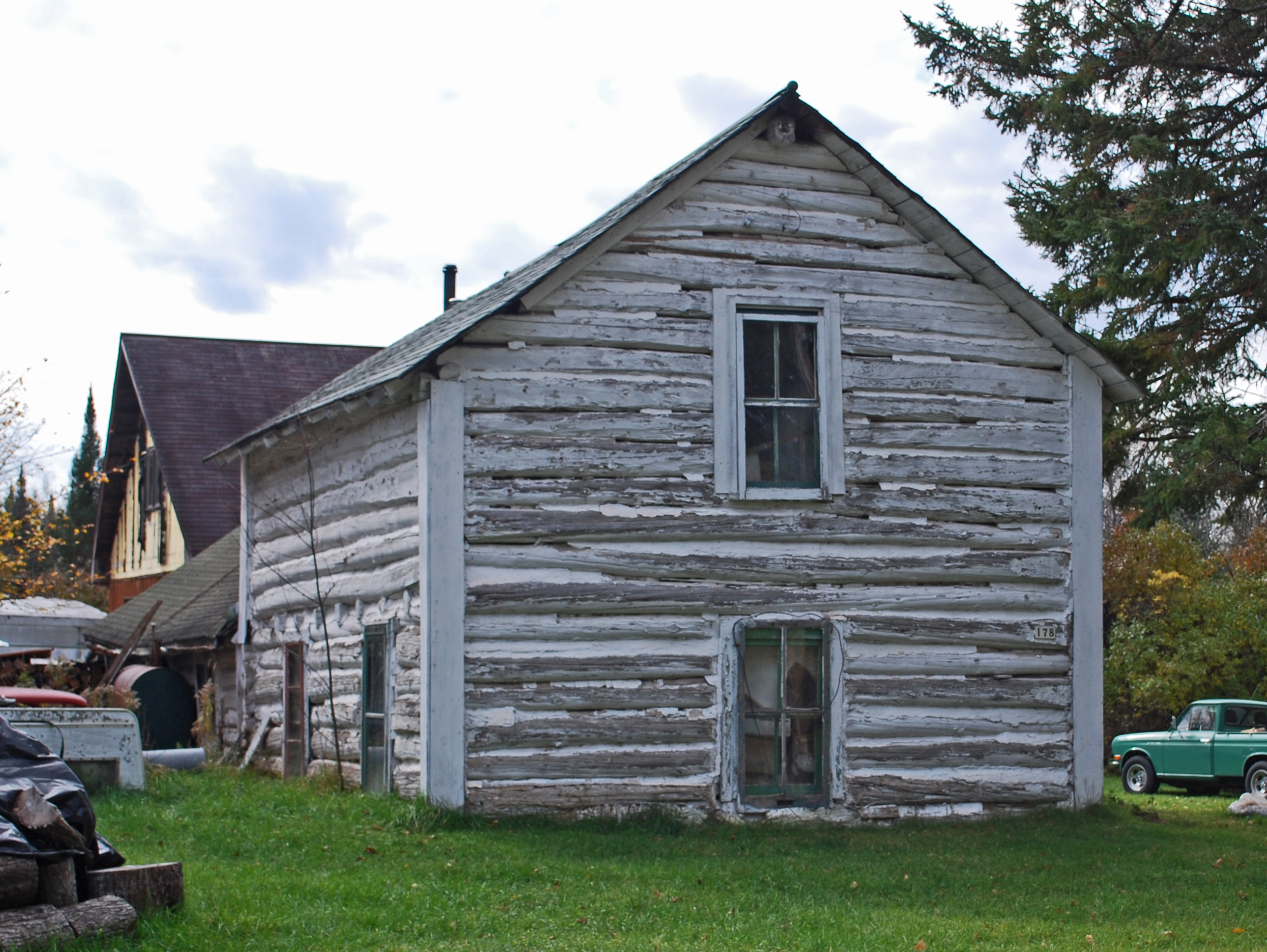

46.231389°N 88.438056°W

The Park City Historic District is a settlement containing seven log houses and associated outbuildings located at Park City and DNR Roads. The houses were built by iron miners working in the nearby Michigan Mine, which operated from October 1891 to 1916. The district is one of three remaining log cabin settlements in Iron County, and is significant as one of the settlements purchased and developed by miners themselves, rather than by the mining company. The houses in the district are one- and 1 1/2-story gable-roofed buildings of horizontal log construction. Several buildings have tar paper or asphalt shingles, and some have frame additions or outbuildings. In addition to the seven standing homes, the district contains the ruins of two other log houses.

== Beechwood ==
Beechwood was first settled in 1882 by J. Jens Larsen, and his wife, Lebbe. The railroad came through the settlement in 1887, and the community received a post office, managed by Lensen, in 1891. In 1912, the Beechwood Store was built; it eventually served as the post office until 1976.

There is one historic property located in Beechwood included in this MRA, along with one that was removed. It is summarized as follows:

=== Bethany Lutheran Church ===
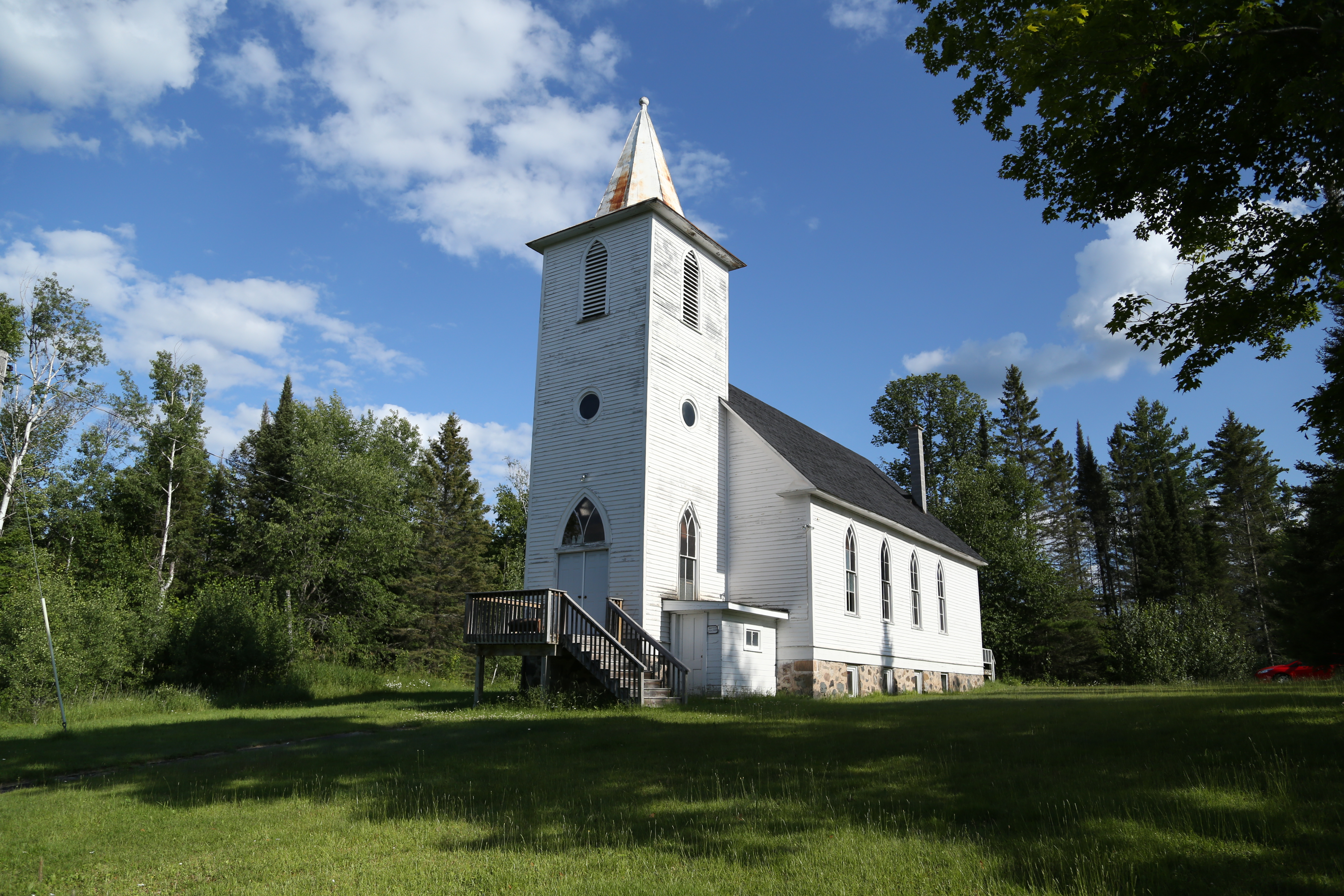

46.159444°N 88.761667°W

Bethany Lutheran Church is small church, dating from 1912 to 1913, located at 184 Beechwood Road. It is significant as a completely unaltered rural church built in the early 20th century. Bethany Lutheran Church was originally organized in 1911 to serve the Swedish Lutheran population of Beechwood. Albert Sandgren, the co-owner of the nearby Beechwood Store, drew the plans for the church building. Volunteers from the congregation did most of the construction work, finishing in 1913.

The church is a rectangular, frame, gable-roofed structure covered with clapboard and sitting on a rough-cut rock foundation. It has a hexagonal apse in the rear containing a small leaded glass window and a square belfry tower in the front. Gothic arched windows line each side and the interior contains a carved oak communion rail and altar. In the 2010s or 2020s, the church's basement was converted to hold the local Beechwood Historical Society's archives and its roof was replaced. In 2024, the society began fundraising to repair the church's steeple, which still retained its original bell. They planned to convert the church's main floor into a museum, retaining the original altar, apse and pews, along with a portion of the space for events like weddings or funerals.

== Other locations ==
There are five historic districts located in rural parts of Iron County on this MRA. These are summarized as follows:

=== Camp Gibbs ===
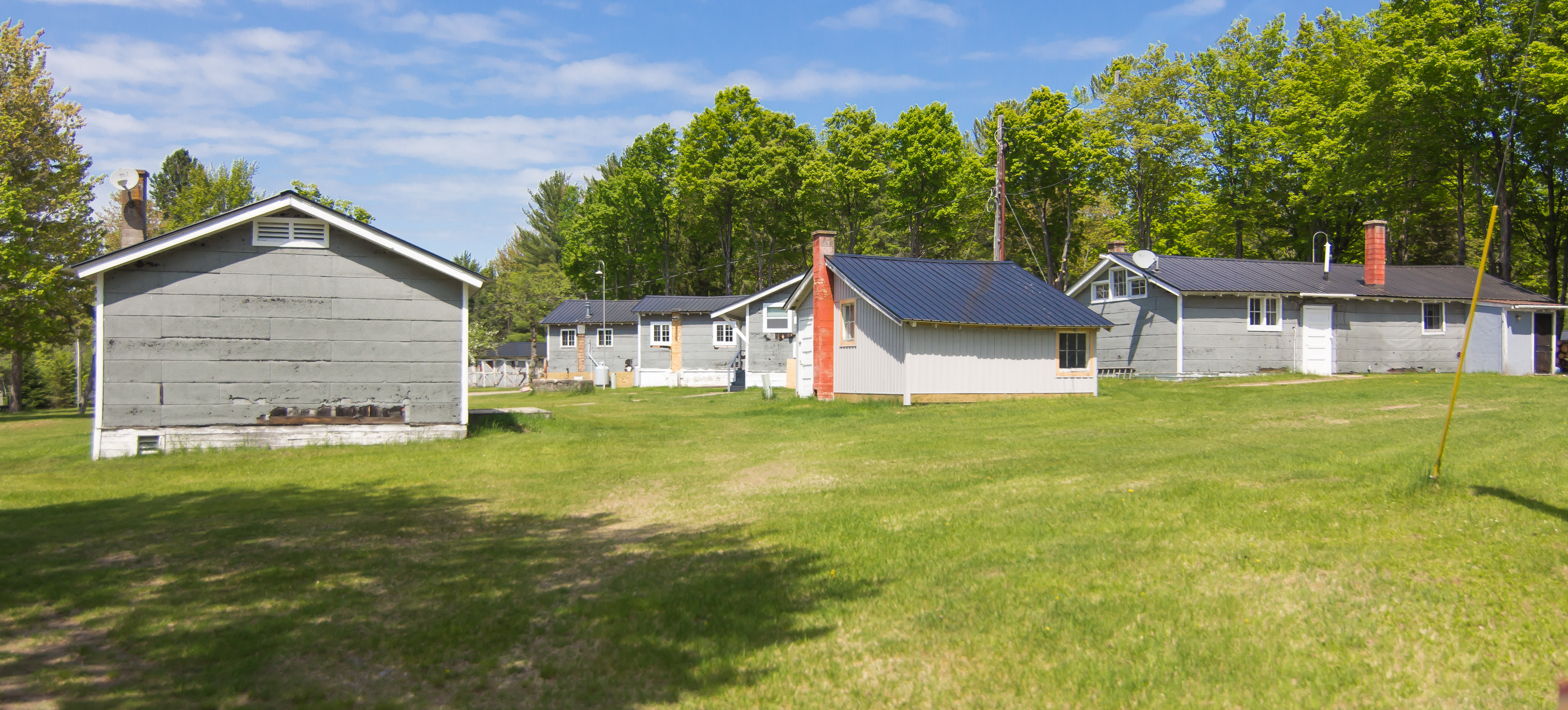

46.201111°N 88.705278°W

Camp Gibbs is a camp located at 129 West Camp Gibbs Road, in the Ottawa National Forest. Camp Gibbs is near what was once Gibbs City, a small settlement named after lumberman RF Gibbs that existed from 1914 to 1966. Camp Gibbs was built by the Civilian Conservation Corps in the latter half of 1935 on land purchased by the US from the Michigan Mineral Land Company, and is the only remaining CCC camp in Michigan. The camp was used from 1935 to 1941 as a Michigan Social Welfare Community Organization site to house workers employed in the forest. In 1967, the Iron County Sportsman Club purchased the camp. The club consolidated with other local clubs in 1974 to form the Camp Gibbs Recreation Area.

Camp Gibbs contains 16 single-story wood-frame, gable-roofed buildings, plus the sites of three other buildings that have been demolished. Many buildings were originally used as barracks, but also include a kitchen, shower room, bakery, garages, and storage. Most of the existing buildings are covered with gray asphalt paper siding, but a few still have original tar paper sheathing with vertical furring strips. The structures are built on wooden posts, some of which have been replaced concrete blocks, and have wooden skirting extending to ground level. The camp represents vernacular architecture from a time when frugality was a substantial concern.

=== Cooks Run Trout Feeding Station ===
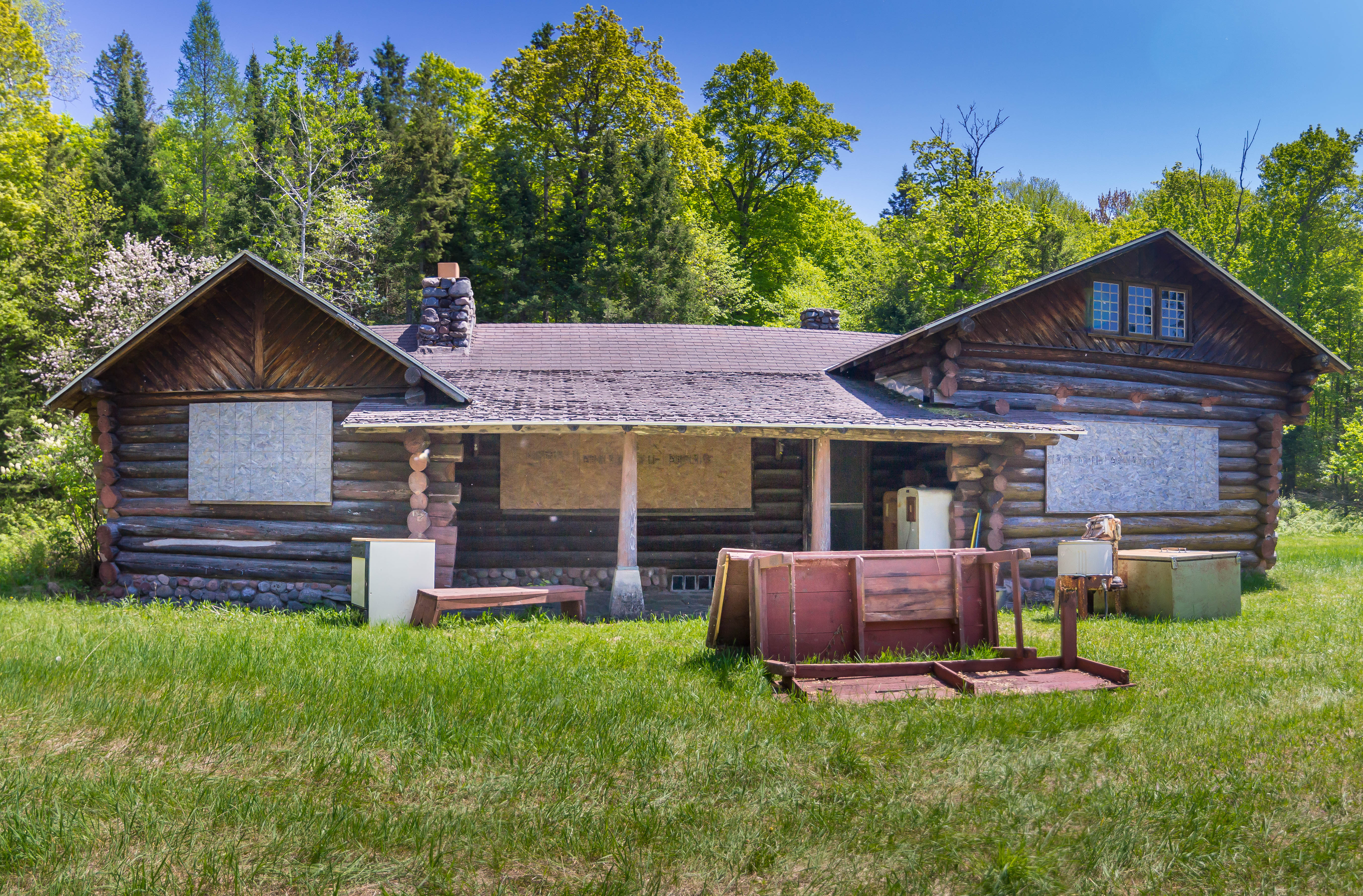

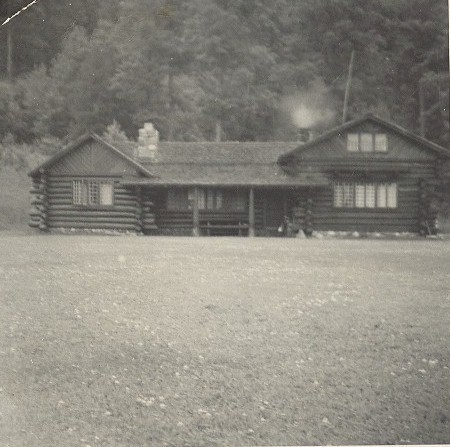

46.155°N 88.892222°W

The Cooks Run Trout Feeding Station is a small trout hatchery, consisting of a pond, dam, and several buildings, located at 180 Cooks Run Road. The station was constructed in 1933–34 by the Civil Works Administration for the use of the Michigan Conservation Department in managing the local fish population. The station is currently operated by the Iron County Park Service.

The most significant building is the caretaker's cabin, which is notable as an outstanding example of vernacular wilderness camp architecture, with finely crafted details and using local building materials. The cabin is a low, 1 1/2-story rustic building, built of round logs on a fieldstone foundation. It has an H-shaped floor plan with gable-roofed legs connected by an open shed-roofed porch stretching between the legs. It is built of notched logs chinked with mortar, with the gable ends of smaller logs laid in a herringbone pattern. Inside, the cabin has four rooms, with fieldstone chimneys and intricate decorative work, including hand-carved light fixtures and a lattice-work stairway built from tree roots by local wood carver Frank Ranwick.

=== Mansfield Mine Location Historic District ===
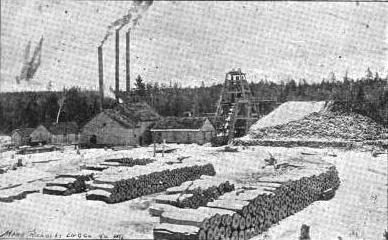

46.118611°N 88.219444°W

The Mansfield Mine Location Historic District is a collection of log buildings located on Stream Road in Mansfield Township. Mining exploration was started in the area in 1882, but was unsuccessful until the founding of the Mansfield Mine in 1889 by the Mansfield Mining Company. A railroad spur was built to the location in 1890, and the area grew quickly. On September 28, 1893, a cave-in occurred, collapsing multiple levels of the mine and allowing the waters of the overhead Michigamme River to break into the mine, drowning twenty-seven of the forty-eight miners working on the site. The incident is still the single worst mining accident in Iron County's history. The mine closed after the accident and all items of value removed. In 1894, a forest fire destroyed all of the original buildings save the timber head frame. In 1896, the DeSoto Iron Company of Springfield, Illinois bought the property, diverted the river, and reopened the mine. Mining continued until 1913, when the Mansfield closed for good.

The Mansfield Mine Location Historic District includes a collection of primarily residential buildings constructed between 1896 and about 1900. Most are small single-story houses of log construction with roofs. Many of these have shed additions. One mine-related building, the rough-cut stone powder house, is still extant.

=== Triangle Ranch Headquarters Historic District ===
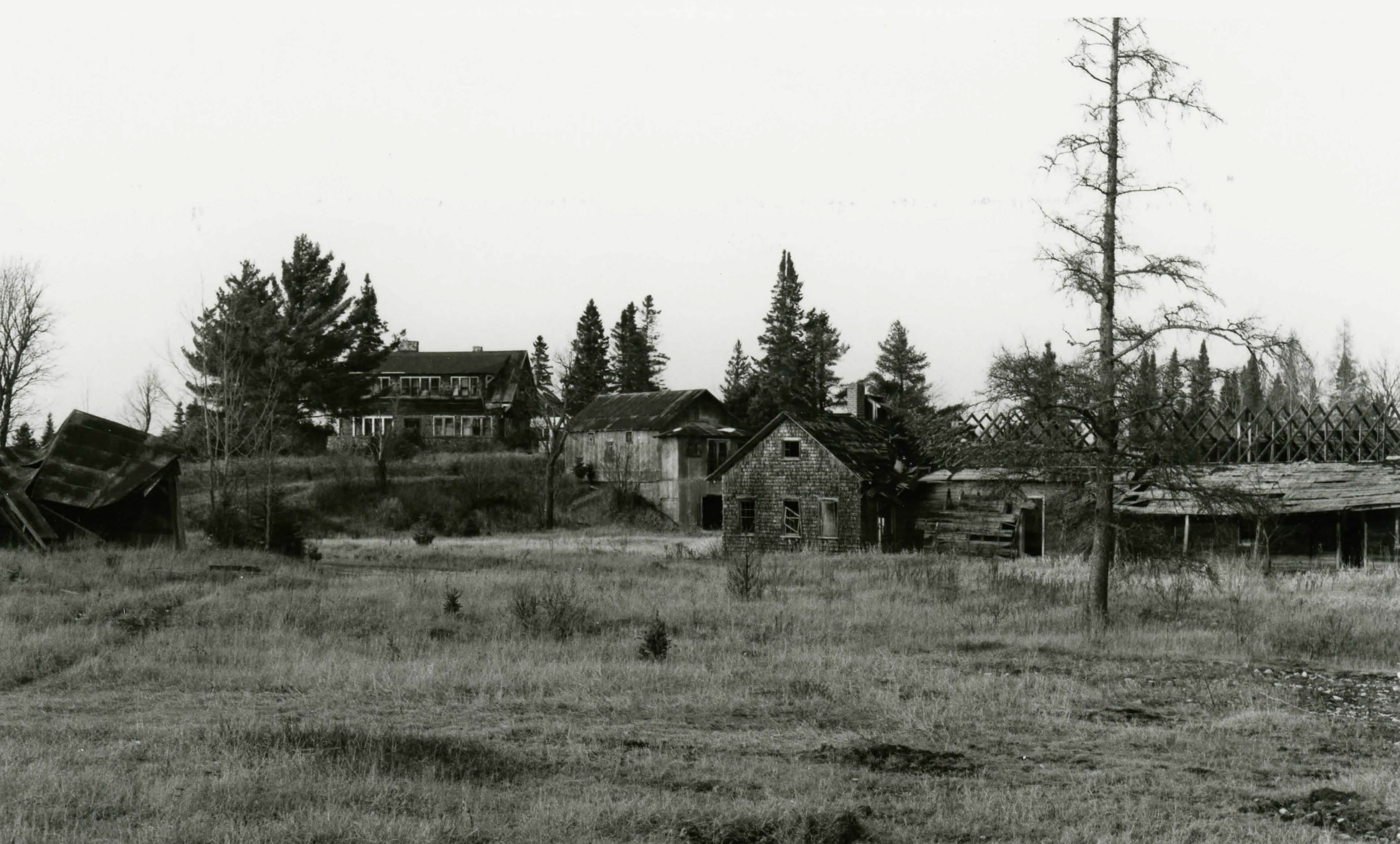

46.315°N 88.420278°W

The Triangle Ranch Headquarters Historic District is a ranch complex located off US-141 north of Amasa. Triangle Ranch was started in 1920 by Judson G. Rosebush, a prominent banker from Appleton, Wisconsin, through an independent company he called the Rosebush Ranch Company. Rosebush's aim was to "test out exhaustively the practicability of large-scale, capitalistic manufacturing methods in agriculture" by raising pedigreed Herefords. Rosebush initially purchased 9,472 acres near Amasa, built five enormous barns and other buildings, and rapidly developed the ranch. However, the short growing season made laying in necessary winter fodder difficult. After 1925, the ranch sold off some parcels of land and attempted to diversify operations by fur farming, raising sheep and poultry, and operating a dude ranch, but was never profitable. In 1952 the Triangle Ranch closed for good.

Triangle Ranch is significant as a rare attempt at large-scale ranching in Michigan. The historic district contains both agricultural and residential buildings. The structures on the site include a frame bungalow sheathed in cobblestones and shingles used as the manager's house, a single-story gable-roofed structure clad with shingles used as the manager's office, three frame bungalows used by ranch employees, a single-story bunkhouse, a gambrel-roof barn, three silos, a board and batten garage, a shop, and a granary.

=== Van Platen - Fox Lumber Camp Historic Complex ===
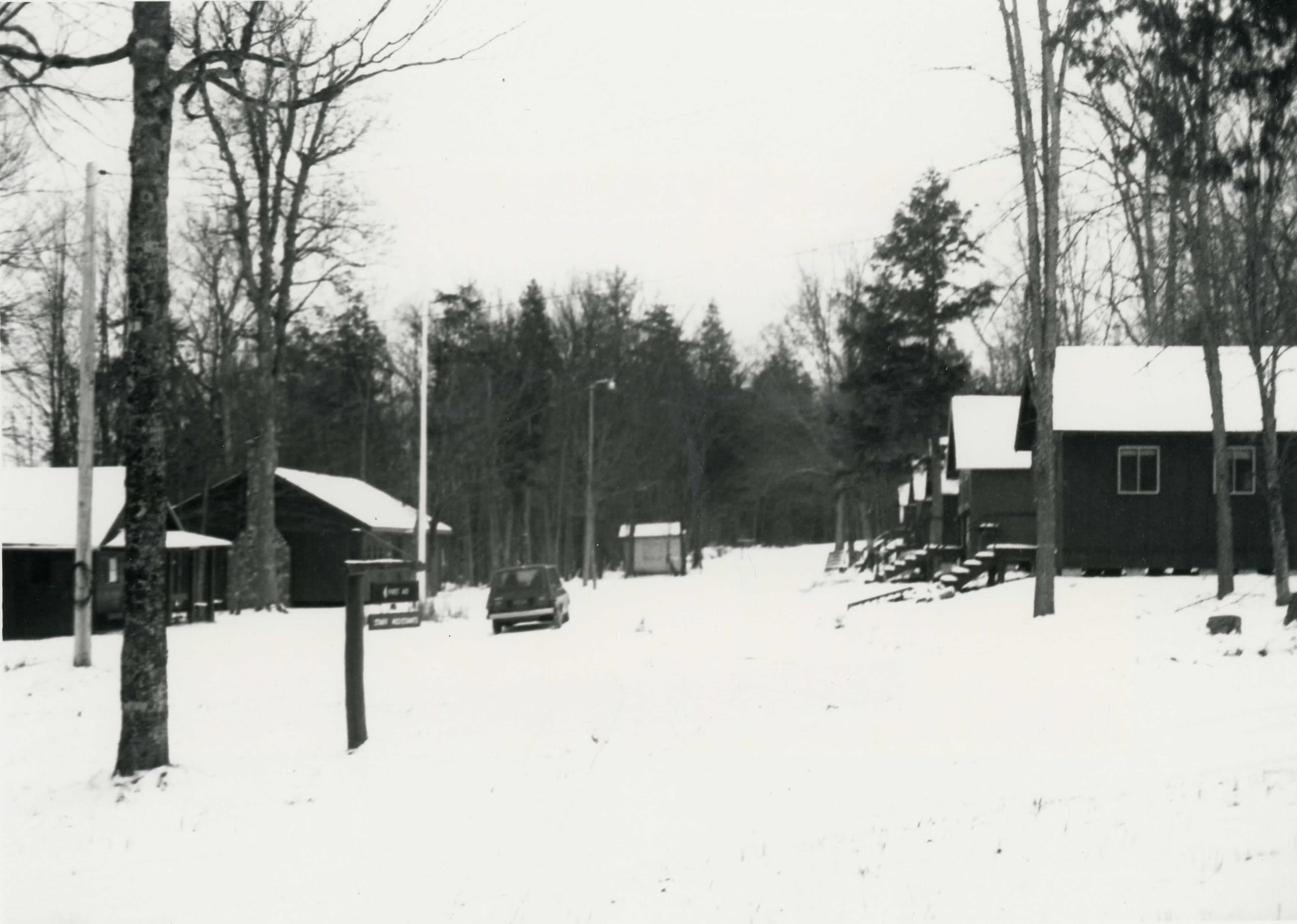

46.176389°N 88.889167°W

The Van Platen - Fox Lumber Camp Historic Complex is a group of four frame buildings located at 281 University Road. The district is significant as perhaps the only extant logging camp in the western Upper Peninsula. The camp was constructed in 1921 by the Van Platen - Fox Lumber Company, who used it as a base for harvesting hardwoods and transporting them to the rail line 2½ miles away. Van Platen - Fox used the camp until 1935. In 1937, the camp was leased by the University of Michigan as a summer training camp for forestry students, and was rechristened Camp Filbert Roth. after the founder of the university's School of Forestry. The university constructed additional classroom buildings on the site, and in 1942 purchased the camp and the surrounding 90 acres. More log cabins were constructed near the site of the original camp, but these more modern buildings do not aesthetically conflict with the original camp structures. In 1988 the university closed the camp, and the property was sold in 1996.

The four frame structures from the original 1921 Van Platen - Fox Lumber Camp are similar single-story buildings with gabled roofs and vertical pine plank siding. Three of the buildings are unaltered, but the camp office/store has two small, single-story additions. As of 2019, the buildings are missing and presumed demolished.

== Removed buildings ==
=== Beechwood Store ===
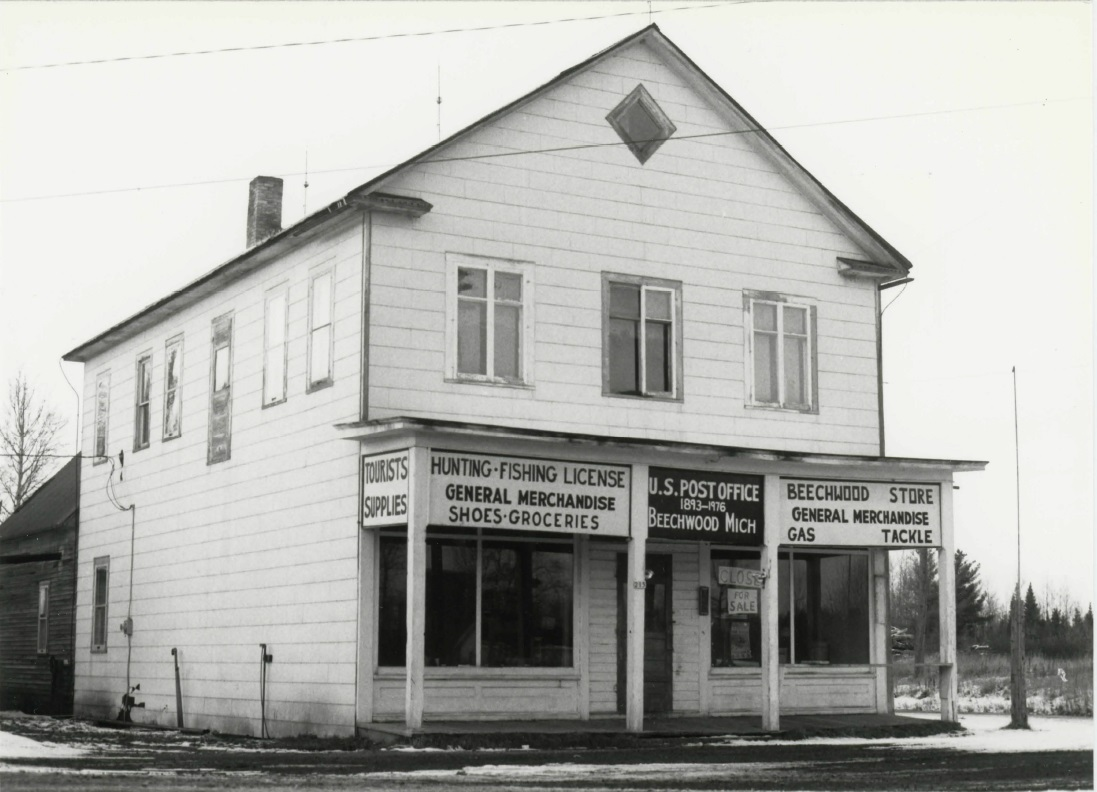

46.16°N 88.7575°W

The Beechwood Store was a two-story, frame, gable-roofed commercial building located at 215 Beechwood Road. It was constructed in 1912 for Albert J. Sandgren and Andres J.T. Anderson, brothers-in-law and community leaders in Beechwood. It served as country store, post office, and the social center of Beechwood, a small Swedish settlement later absorbed into Iron River. The store was operated as a family enterprise by a series of owners, continuing to serve as the post office until 1976, and finally closed in 1979.

The original 1912 store had a single-story 1915 addition to the rear, and a 1920 gas station/garage was located near the main building. Most of the store had been re-sided with asbestos shingles, but the storefront and the interior of the general store retained their original appearance even after the store closed. The building was demolished c. 2006. It was removed from the NRHP in 2020.

== See also ==
- National Register of Historic Places listings in Iron County, Michigan
