= Strousberg =

Strousberg is a surname. Notable people with the surname include:

- Bethel Henry Strousberg (1823–1884), German industrialist
  - Palais Strousberg, palace built in Berlin by Bethel Henry Strousberg

== See also ==
- Strausberg
