= Embassy of the United Kingdom, Berlin =

Embassy of the United Kingdom to Germany

British Embassy, Berlin
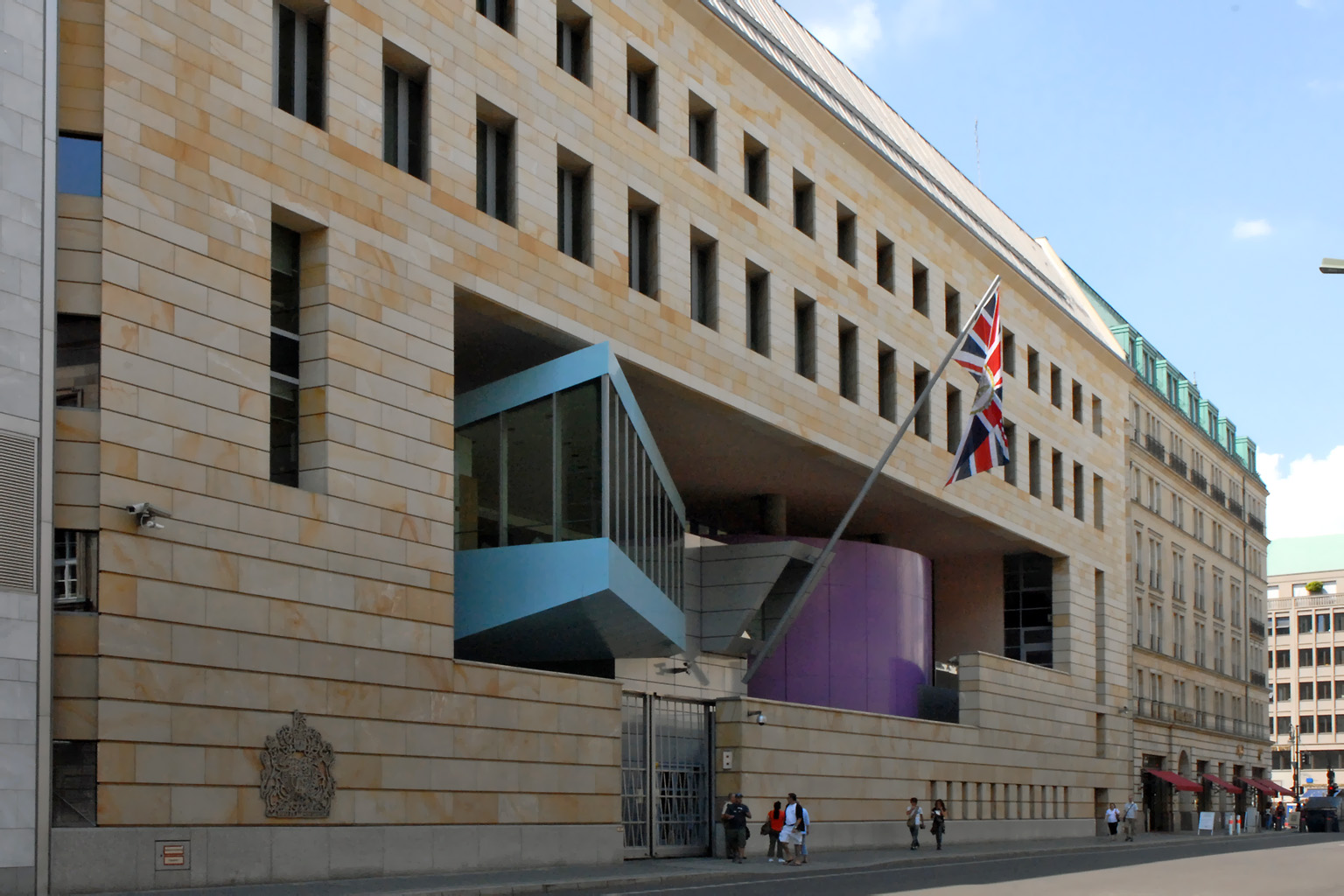
- The Embassy building in Berlin
- Location: Berlin, Germany
- Address: 70-71 Wilhelmstraße
- Coordinates: 52°30′57″N 13°22′51″E
- Ambassador: Andrew Jonathan Mitchell CMG
- Website: British Embassy, Berlin

The British Embassy in Berlin (German: Britische Botschaft, Berlin) is the United Kingdom's diplomatic mission to Germany. It is located on 70-71 Wilhelmstraße, near the Hotel Adlon, in Berlin. The current ambassador is Andrew Jonathan Mitchell CMG.

== Palais Strousberg ==
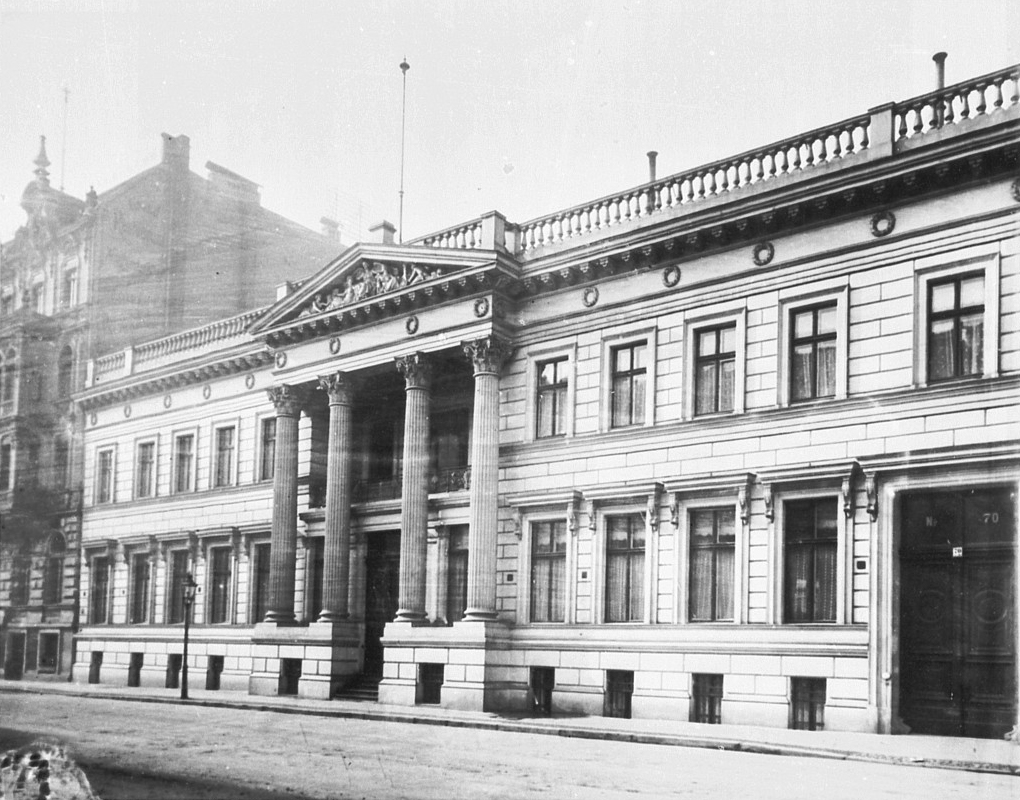
The Palais Strousberg later to become the old British embassy building

Before moving to the Wilhelmstraße, the British mission used, among others, the building at Leipziger Platz 12 and the Niederländisches Palais), from 1797 to 1803. The original building at 70 Wilhelmstraße, known as the Palais Strousberg and designed by August Orth, was built in 1868 by the railway magnate Bethel Henry Strousberg. In December 1884, the United Kingdom bought the site after renting it for some years after Strousberg's bankruptcy and the subsequent sale of the building to Hugo zu Hohenlohe-Öhringen in 1876. Wilhelmstraße was then a centre for the German government, being the location of the Imperial Chancellery and the Foreign Ministry.

When diplomatic relations were broken off at the outbreak of World War I, the building stood empty. Surviving a fire during the upheavals of the 1919 revolution, it was reoccupied in 1920 when Edgar Vincent d'Abernon became ambassador. At the beginning of World War II, relations were broken off again. The building was heavily damaged by Allied bombing during the war and was demolished in 1950. The title to the land nevertheless remained in the possession of the United Kingdom.

== Cold War era ==
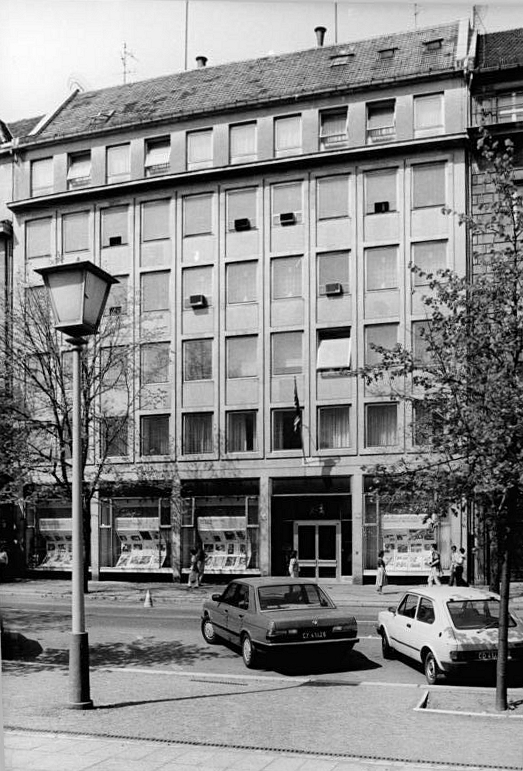
Building Unter den Linden 32-34

Between 1949 and 1990, Germany was divided. The British Ambassador to the Federal Republic of Germany (West Germany) was based in Bonn, the capital city of that state. The British embassy to the German Democratic Republic (East Germany) was situated near to the old embassy, at Unter den Linden 32-34.

== Post-reunification building ==
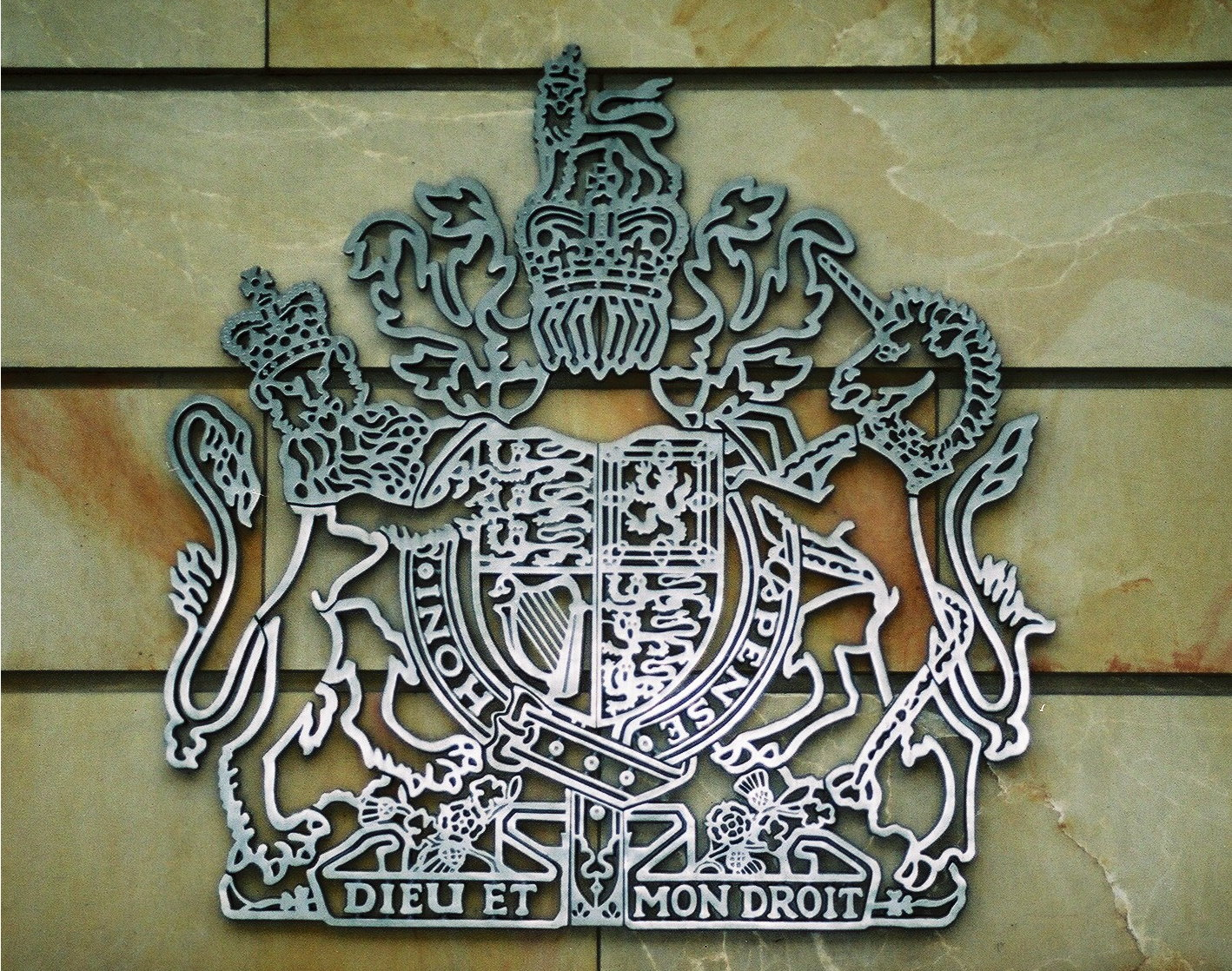
Coat of arms

Upon reunification in 1990, the German government returned the seat of government from Bonn to Berlin. Accordingly, the British government decided to reoccupy the Wilhelmstraße site, despite the German Foreign Office no longer being located on this street. An architectural competition was held, and won by the practice of Michael Wilford and Partner (see also Manuel Schupp). Ground was broken at the site on 29 June 1998 by Derek Fatchett MP, and the new building opened by Queen Elizabeth II on 18 July 2000.

=== Architecture ===
The British embassy is the first, and to date, only embassy in Germany to be built under a private finance initiative. Arteos, a Bilfinger Berger owned special purpose entity, financed and were to operate the embassy building for 30 years. A further 30-year extension is possible, following which the building will revert to British government ownership. In December 2006, Bilfinger sold their interest in the embassy to the UK firm Secondary Market Infrastructure Fund.

Conscious of the necessity for modern embassies to forge good and open relationships with the German public, Wilford endowed the main floor with a café, library and restaurant. The security zone used to begin on the fourth floor but, with the perceived increased risk from terrorists, the site is now totally secured, and the intended public spaces are no longer freely accessible.

== Events ==
On 10 August 2021, British and German authorities arrested an embassy security guard for passing documents to Russian intelligence for money. The guard, a 57-year-old British locally-hired contract worker, was named as David Smith. MI5, the Metropolitan Police's Counter Terrorism Command, the BKA (German federal police), and various prosecutors had investigated the man for months prior to his arrest in Potsdam. On 17 February 2023, Smith was sentenced to 13 years and two months in prison.

== See also ==
- List of diplomats of the United Kingdom to Germany
