= Reichshof (disambiguation) =

Reichshof is a municipality in Germany.

Reichshof may also refer to:

- Rzeszów, Poland, whose German name from 1941 to 1945 was Reichshof
- Reichshof Hotel Hamburg, Germany

== See also ==
- Reichshofstadion, in Lustenau, Austria
- Aulic Council (German: Reichshofrat), a supreme court of the Holy Roman Empire
