= Gethsemane Church =

Protestant church in Berlin, Germany

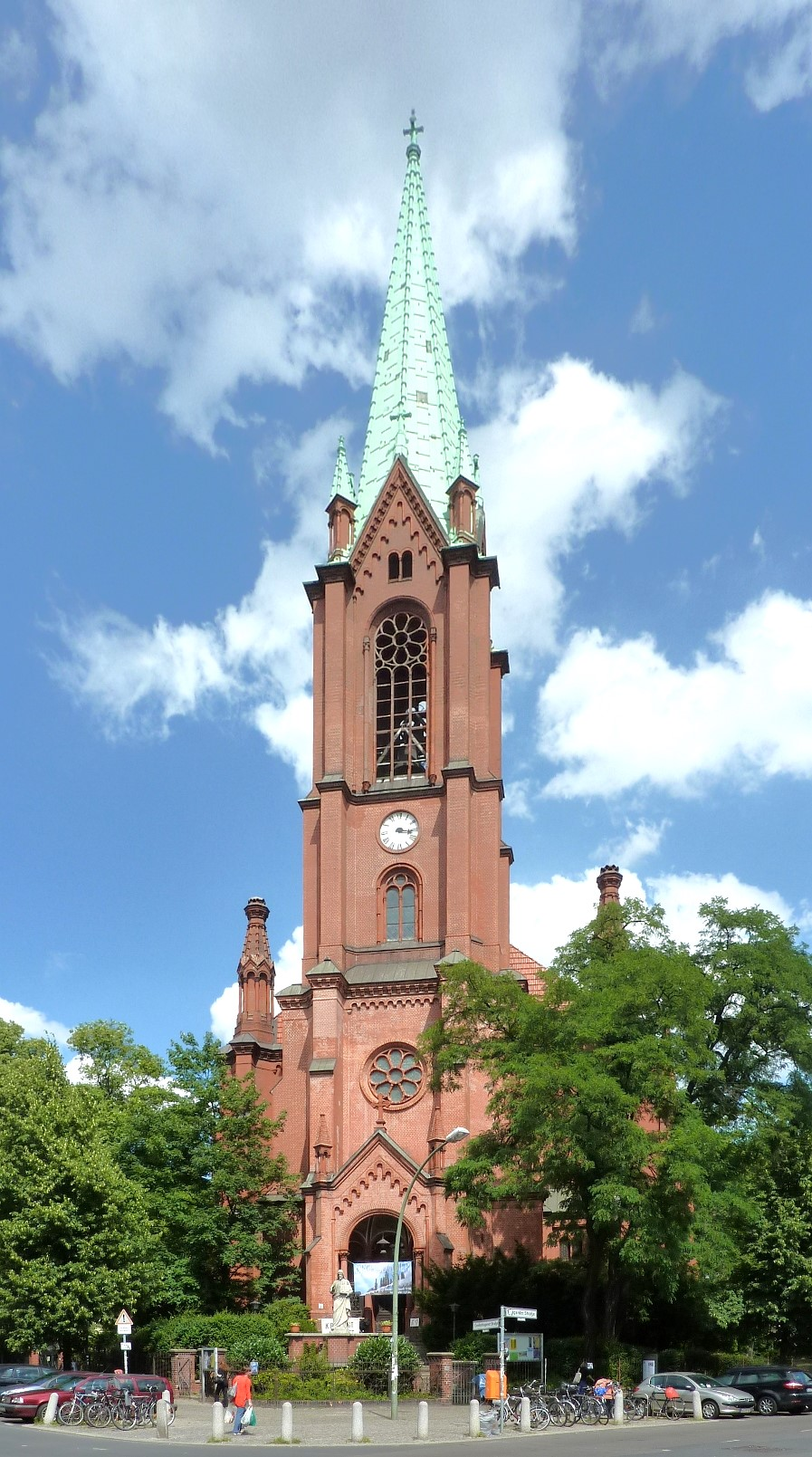

Religion
- Affiliation: Lutheran
- District: Sprengel Berlin, Kirchenkreis Berlin Stadtmitte
- Province: Evangelical Church of Berlin-Brandenburg-Silesian Upper Lusatia

Location
- Location: Prenzlauer Berg, a locality of Berlin, Germany
- Interactive map of Gethsemane Church
- Coordinates: 52°32′51″N 13°25′00″E

Architecture
- Architect: August Orth
- Style: mixing Romanesque Revivalism and neo-Brick Gothic
- Completed: 1893; 133 years ago
- Materials: brick

Website
- Northern Prenzlauer Berg Congregation (official website) (in German)

Gethsemane Church (German: Gethsemanekirche) is one of four church buildings of the Lutheran Northern Prenzlauer Berg Evangelical Congregation (German: Evangelische Kirchengemeinde Prenzlauer Berg-Nord), within the Evangelical Church of Berlin-Brandenburg-Silesian Upper Lusatia, an umbrella organisation which includes Lutheran, Reformed, and United Protestant Calvinist congregations.

Gethsemane Church is the best known church in the locality of Prenzlauer Berg, in Berlin's borough of Pankow. The church was named after the Garden of Gethsemane (Old Aramaic גת שמנא, transliterated Gath Šmānê, Hebrew: גת שמנים, translit. Gath Šmānîm, lit. "oil press", transliteration in Greek: Γεθσημανή Gethsēmanḗ) at the foot of the Mount of Olives in Jerusalem. Christians revere the place as it was where the Twelve Apostles and Jesus of Nazareth prayed on the eve of his crucifixion.

The church and its congregation played a crucial role before and during the Wende (or peaceful revolution) in the former German Democratic Republic (East Germany) in the autumn of 1989.

The church was built between 1891 and 1893 erected following the plans of August Orth, the city's Baurat.

== Parish ==
Due to the high number of new parishioners moving into its area the end of the 19th century, the city's Zion's Church grew too small. Its congregation commissioned August Orth to build a new church for a new parish which was to be carved out of its own. On 26 February 1893 the new Gethsemane Church was inaugurated, and on March 15 of the same year the Gethsemane Church Congregation (German: Gethsemane-Kirchengemeinde) was constituted, with its parish comprising the formerly northern part of the Zion's Church parish. In 1907, the parish of the Gethsemane Church Congregation was itself sub-divided to form the Paul Gerhardt Congregation, comprising the northerly part of the parish, and the Elijah Church Congregation, comprising the southerly part of the parish. Both built their own new churches in 1910.

Today's congregation emerged from the merger of four congregations, those of Elijah, Paul Gerhardt, Gethsemane, and the Church of the Blessing, in March 2001. Each congregation contributed – among other things – its church building, to wit the Church of the Blessing (German: Segenskirche), Gethsemane Church, Paul Gerhardt Church, and Elijah Church (German: Eliaskirche, now a museum for children). The present-day congregation provides services of worship in the first three of these and in the Elijah Domed Hall. Its parish now comprises the northeastern part of the German: Rosenthaler Vorstadt ("Suburb towards Rosenthal"), which was divided among Berlin's three former boroughs of Wedding, Mitte, and Prenzlauer Berg, following the formation of Greater Berlin by the Prussian Greater Berlin Act of 1920. The population in the parish of the Northern Prenzlau Berg Congregation underwent a change after 1990, with many young people and families moving in.

== Church ==
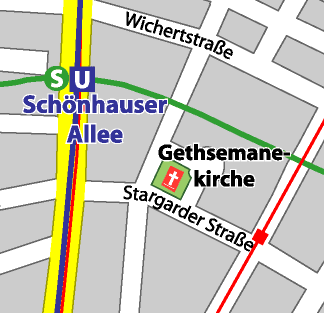
Topographical position of Gethsemane Church

Gethsemane Church is located at the crossroads of Stargarder Straße with Greifenhagener Straße, about 100 meters east of the Schönhauser Allee, close to the combined S-Bahn and Underground station of the same name. The church building is oriented east-west, and its western tower forms a decorative façade onto the crossroads. Gethsemanestraße, named after the church, surrounds the choir at the eastern side of the building, and its northern side, forming with the two other streets a kind of a square around the church.

The Stargarder Straße shows a slight curve at the crossroads, so that the Gethsemane Church forms a landmark which can be seen from both ends of the street. The northern suburbs of Berlin now have few prestigious buildings, so the school and Evangelical church buildings provide most of this area's architectural interest.

Caroline Griebenow, a substantial owner of property in the area, donated the site for the construction of a church. The site was first refused, because it lay in an area not yet built up. Finally, on 20 March 1891, the cornerstone was laid. Between 1866 and 1873, the architect, August Orth, had also built Zion's Church, then serving the parishioners as place of worship. The Evangelical Association for the Construction of Churches (German: Evangelischer Kirchenbauverein), a charitable organisation then headed by Queen Augusta Victoria, financed the constructions. The Prussian King William II attended the inauguration of Gethsemane Church in his then function as summus episcopus (Supreme Governor of the Evangelical State Church of Prussia's older Provinces) and proclaimed the building to be named Gethsemane Church.

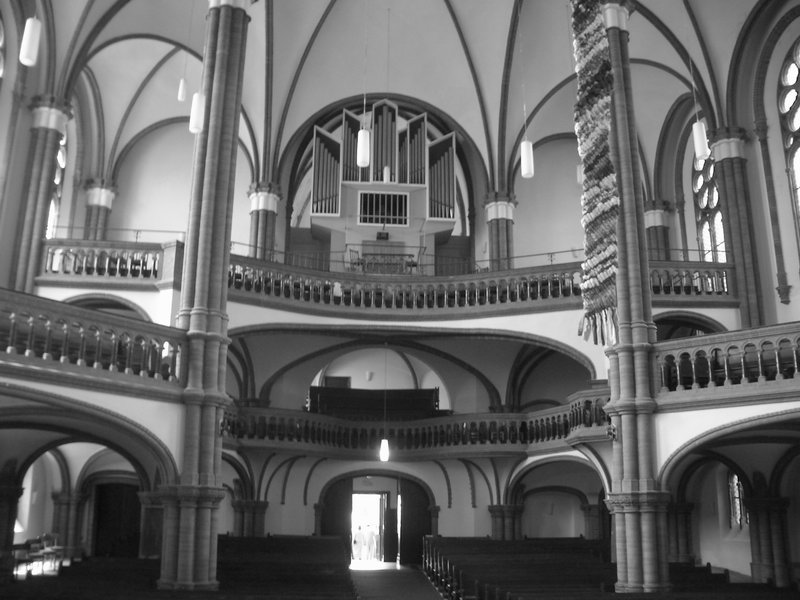
Interior, seen from East

Gethsemane Church, like Zion's Church, harmonically combines the outside impression of a longish shape, as typical for traditional (Roman Catholic) churches, due to their long inside nave and the centralised auditory hall, as typical for genuine Protestant church buildings. Inside the crossing is extended to a wide octagon, including the side naves, allowing the congregants a good view and listening. The pulpit originally stood in the centre of the octagon. Due to the high number of congregants at the time of its construction, lofts hang around the octagonal prayer hall except of its eastern side, which is open to the quire. On the western side of the octagon the lofts are even double storied with an additional upper organ loft. The building weathered the Second World War intact. In 1961, the interior was renovated. On this occasion the altar was drawn from the apse into the prayer hall.

According to the style, Orth oscillates between forms of Romanesque Revivalism with round arch windows and neo-Brick Gothic with traceries and rib vaults. The eastern choir is formed like a polygonal apse, illuminated by three coloured windows of stained glass (as of 1893) and surrounded by an ambulatory, which houses the sacristy and other rooms for purposes of the congregation.

The western tower has a square ground plan and is surmounted by a steep copper-roofed spire 62 metres high and stands over a vaulted entrance hall. The outside façades are built of red brick, with buttresses and pinnacles.

== Furnishings ==
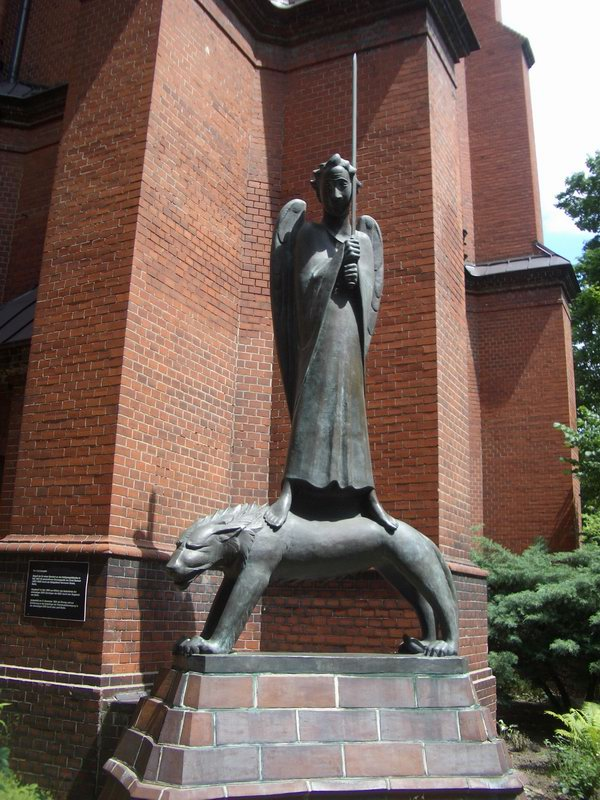
The Geistkämpfer (spiritual fighter) by Ernst Barlach.

The lofts are confined by stone parapets of little Romanesque columns and glazed terracotta. The organ is a modern instrument by the firm of Sauer of Frankfurt upon Oder. The relocated altar has been decked by a crucifix and candlestick by Fritz Kühn since 1961. In the southern transept there is the expressionist wooden sculpture Praying Christ by Wilhelm Groß (as of 1923). The sculpture commemorates Jesus of Nazareth in the garden of Gethsemane, praying before his arrest: "O my Father, if it be possible, let this cup pass from me: nevertheless not as I will, but as thou wilt." (Gospel of Matthew 26:39). The sculpture displays this moment, when Jesus begged for his life, in a touching way. The sculpture was donated in honour of the parishioners, who died in the battlefields of First World War.

The statue of the Benedictive Christ, rescued from the Church of Reconciliation (German: Versöhnungskirche), before it was exploded in 1985 by the GDR government in order to clear more space along the Berlin Wall, now (since 1993) stands outside in front of the western portal of Gethsemane Church. A bronze statue of the Benedictive Christ (after Bertel Thorvaldsen) originally shown at the western entrance is now presented on the cemetery of the congregation in Berlin-Nordend.

Since 1994 an imitation of the expressionist statue of the Geistkämpfer (spiritual fighter) by Ernst Barlach after an original created in 1928 for the Lutheran Church of the Holy Spirit in Kiel, has stood in front of the southern façade of the church, commemorating the activists who fought for democracy in East Germany.

In the churchyard looking towards the Stargarder Straße, a plate commemorates the German resistance against the Nazi government by Karl Biedermann. The East German government denied permission for this to be displayed on another site provided for it, as it lacked the official heroic symbols of the struggle, so it was erected on the church's land on 3 October 1990.

== Autumn 1989 ==
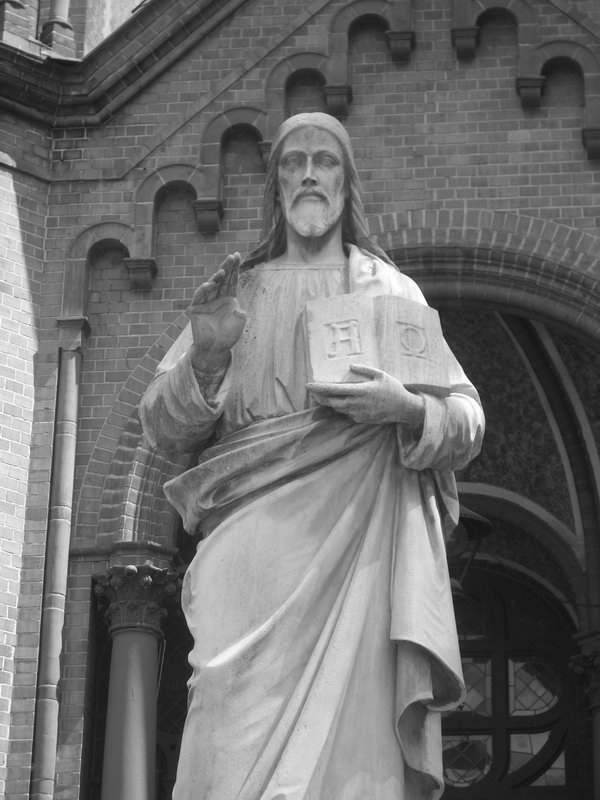
Statue of the Benedictive Christ, rescued from the exploded Church of Reconciliation.

In the 1980s the Gethsemane Church, like many others, became a meeting point for opponents of the East German regime (see also Monday demonstrations in East Germany) and the independent peace movement. This was because churches, although infiltrated by agents of the state, were the only non-streamlined places in East Germany where such opponents could meet. People attending rogation prayers for arrested opponents of the state, peace prayers, or public debates, were not necessarily parishioners or even members of the church. In 1987 the congregation participated in the German Evangelical Church Assembly, attracting people from all over East Germany. The opposition intensified after 17 January 1988, when demonstrators, carrying banners with Rosa Luxemburg's quotation "Freedom is always the freedom of the one who thinks differently" (German: Freiheit ist immer die Freiheit des Andersdenkenden), were arrested during the annual Communist-Party-organised memorial march in honour of Luxemburg and Karl Liebknecht. Opponents of the regime unveiled electoral fraud during the East German local elections held on 7 May 1988, and more people joined them after the Tiananmen Square protests of 1989 had started.

From 2 October 1989, in the run-up to the 40th anniversary of the foundation of East Germany, the Gethsemane Church began to keep its doors unlocked day and night, true to its motto "Be vigilant and Pray" (German: Wachet und betet), from the Gospel of Matthew. Thousands attended public discussions and lit candles on the plaza in front of the church. On 7 October, the East German national day, the police of the GDR and secret Stasi units violently cracked down on demonstrators in Schönhauser Allee, and some of them managed to flee into the Gethsemane Church. However, some 500 people were then arrested and were held for several weeks.

On 9 October, in a speech made in the Gethsemane Church, Gottfried Forck, the president of the eastern section of the Evangelical Church of Berlin-Brandenburg, called for the democratisation and legitimation of the East German government.

After the resignation of the old East German regime, the Gethsemane Church became a centre of the civil rights movement. In March 1990 representatives in the first freely elected Volkskammer attended a service in the church to mark their first session.

== After 1990 ==
There are still activists of the peace movement among the congregation. Starting with the Second Gulf War in 1991, regular prayers for peace have been heard in the church. During the Roman Catholic and Protestant Ecumenical Church Convention of 2003, Gethsemane Church took centre stage. As announced earlier, and despite having been explicitly forbidden by Pope John Paul II to do so, the Roman Catholic priest Gotthold Hasenhüttl from Austria administered the Eucharist in Gethsemane Church, knowing that Protestants were among the communicants. Thousands wanted to take part and lined up outside in the street. In the course of the same ecumenical convention, the Catholic priest Bernhard Kroll participated in a Lord's Supper in the German Protestant manner. Both priests were suspended or had to resign.

== See also ==
- 1893 in architecture
- List of Lutheran churches
- List of places of worship in Berlin
