= Palais Strousberg =

Demolished mansion and later the old British embassy to Germany

Coordinates: 52°30′57″N 13°22′51″E

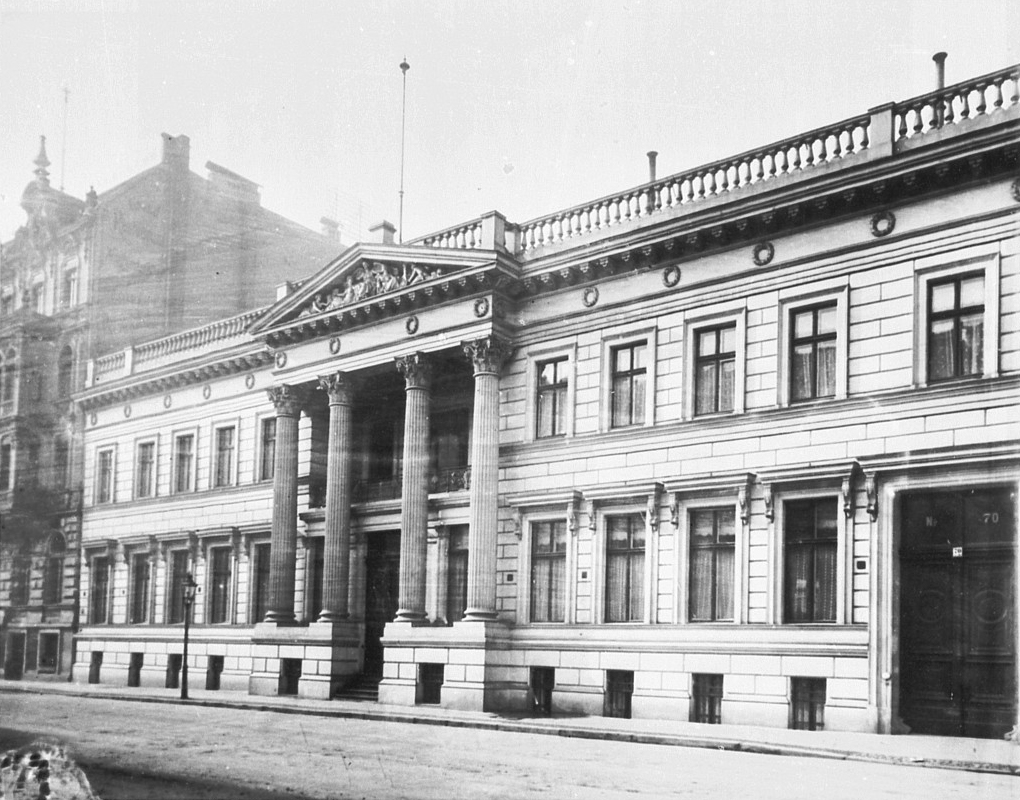
Facade to Wilhelmstraße, 1896

The Palais Strousberg was a large city mansion built in Berlin, Germany for the railway magnate Bethel Henry Strousberg. (Note: Strousberg is frequently referred to as "The Railway King" (Der Eisenbahnkönig).) It was designed by the architect August Orth and built between 1867–68 at No.70 Wilhelmstraße. The grandiose splendour of its accommodation and novel integration of the latest building technologies into the fabric of the building, ensured that Berliners would still find the Palais impressive decades after its construction, becoming the model of refined luxury in Berlin architecture.

After the Strousberg family's bankruptcy in 1875, the building was rented to the embassy of Great Britain and Ireland which eventually purchased the property in 1884. Following World War II Wilhelmstraße was partitioned into the East German sector of Berlin in 1948. The Palais, which had been severely damaged during the war, was demolished in the 1950s.

== A palace for a 'Railway King' ==
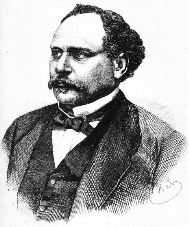
Engraving of Bethel Henry Strousberg circa 1860

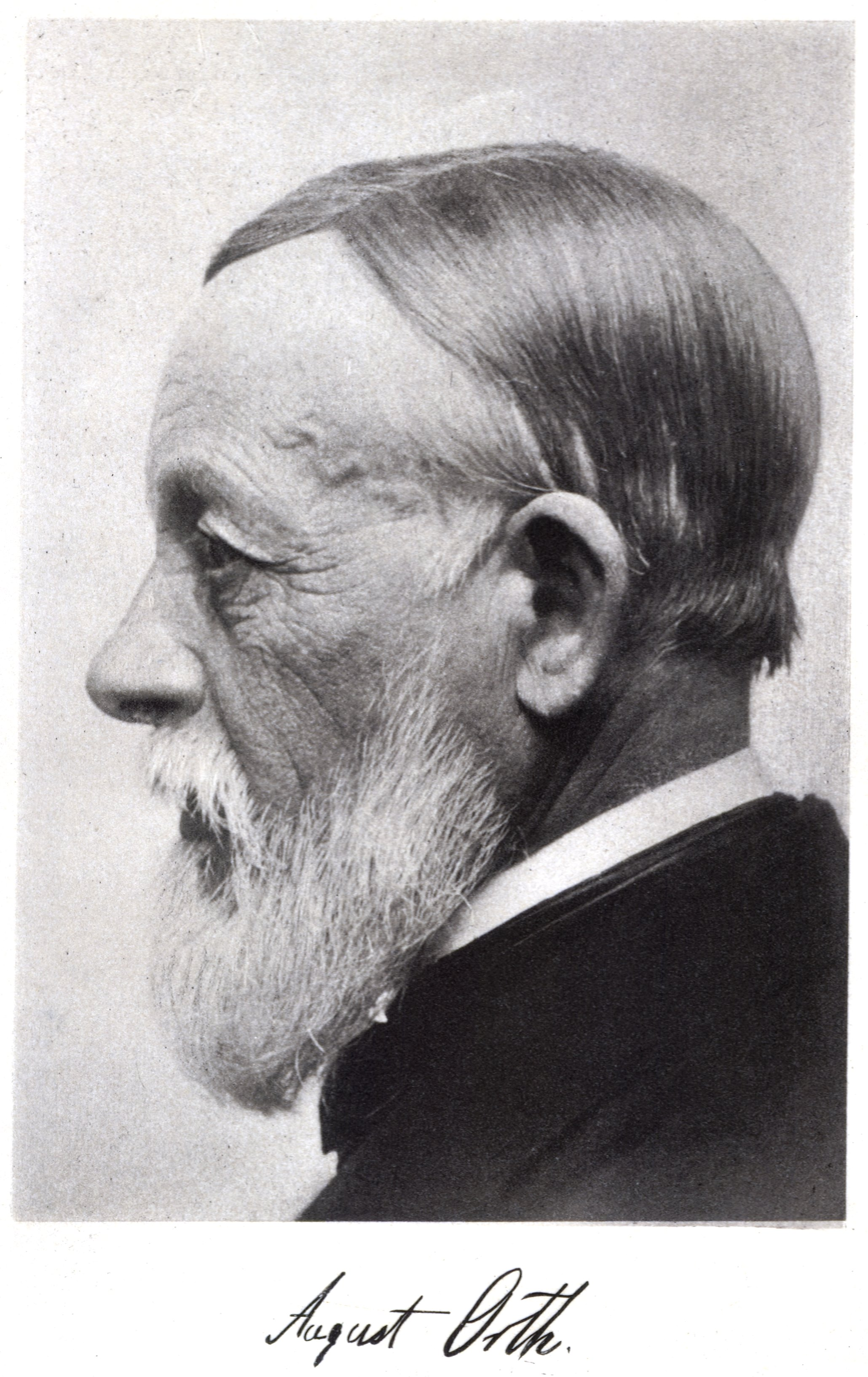
Photograph of August Orth.

Before the purchase of No. 70 Wilhelmstrasse, Strousberg had bought No. 80 Wilhelmstrasse which he then sold on to the Prussian treasury at a profit. He bought No. 70 Wilhelmstrasse for 122,500 Taler in 1867. Designed by August Orth the palace was built for 900,000 Goldmarks, re-using materials from an older building which had served as the residence of the Prussian statesman Friedrich Carl von Savigny. Orth, at the time, was the personal architect for the Strousberg family and had provided them with designs for several private building projects such as the renovations to Castle Zbirow near Pilsen which was the family's country seat. Orth also designed buildings for some of the business enterprises controlled by Strousberg, amongst which were the Berliner Viehmarkt (Berlin Cattle Market) at Brunnenstraße, Berlin, for the Cattle Market Company (Viehmarkt Kommanditgesellschaft) and the Görlitzer Bahnhof railway terminus and such buildings as the Kaiserbahnhof Halbe for the Berlin-Görlitzer Railway. The Palais is one of the few buildings where Orth designed a facade in a neoclassical style rather than his usual use of neo-renaissance for secular buildings and Neo-gothic for ecclesiastical buildings. Some details of the exterior such as the Baroque balustrade and the rich decoration of the interior, were borrowed from many other architectural styles, single the palace out as an example of eclectic historicism.

Strousberg, as an early railway pioneer, played a key role in Berlin's economic development, and commanded a considerable reputation as a man of progress. So it was appropriate that he should build "the first modern palace to be built in Berlin", equipped with the latest technical innovations such as gas lighting, hot water heating, washing machines and bathrooms, which were unheard-of in the domestic architecture of Berlin at the time. Strousberg's reputation was further bolstered, not only by the building's prestigious address close to the ministries and palaces of the Berlin elite, but also by the extensive social accommodation he provided within the building. The entire ground floor was dedicated to the entertainment of his guests and included a ballroom, various drawing rooms, a library, billiard room and a gallery for Strousberg's art collection.

Decades after its construction the magazine "Berliner Architekturwelt" noted in Orth's obituary in 1902 that the Palais was a "masterpiece of distinguished and courtly design" and the standard text, "Berlin und seine Bauten" had noted in 1896 that the planning, facilities and interior were still without equal in Berlin and that the building had effectively utilised many new building materials and techniques. These innovations were imported from Prussia and put modern materials into service to imitate traditional features, such as painted zinc casting and plaster casts in place of carved stone, or stucco in place of marble.

== Use as the British Embassy ==
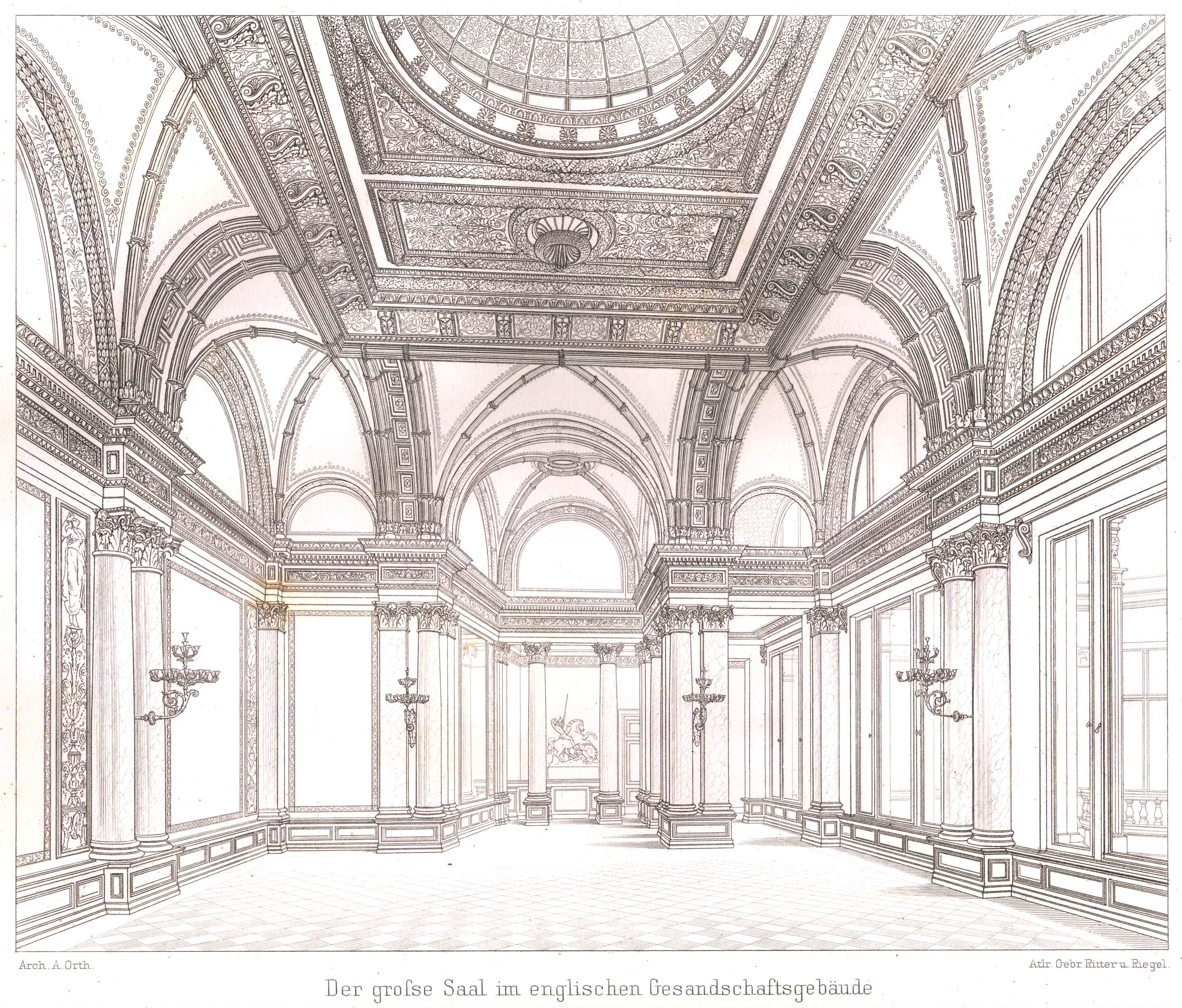
Design drawing of the great hall of the British embassy by August Orth

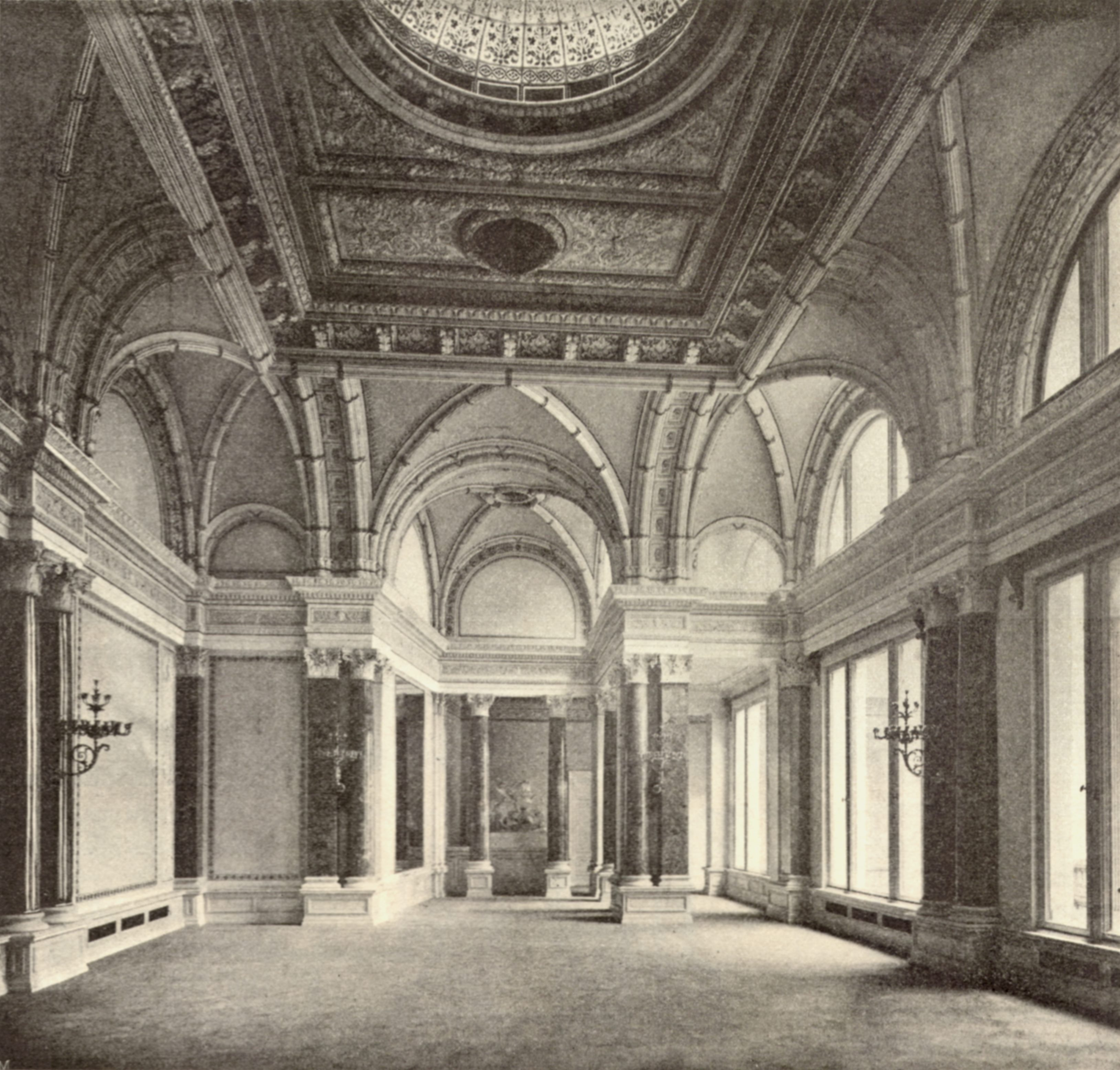
Photograph of the great hall

Strousberg's empire began a terminal decline during the Franco-Prussian War (1870–71). In 1872, he was forced into liquidation after a ruinous settlement with the Romanian government on account of unfulfilled railway contracts. Strousberg was declared bankrupt in 1875 and the Palais was seized as an asset by his creditors. After standing trial in Russia for alleged fraudulent transactions with a bank in 1876, he was deported and returned to Berlin, dividing his time between London and the castle in Bromberg whilst attempting his social rehabilitation with various projects and writing his memoirs.

On the March 20, 1876 the palace was sold to Prince Hugo zu Hohenlohe-Öhringen. However, the general and hereditary member of the Prussian parliament did not occupy the building. An 1877 directory of Berlin's buildings listed the building rented to The office of the British embassy (Note: Büreau [sic] der Englischen Botschaft) and the occupant as the British ambassador, Lord Odo Russell. Attracted by the building's prime location, the site on Wilhelmstrasse became the location for the British embassy in Berlin for many decades. The prince sold the property on December 18, 1884 to the Commissioners of Her Britannic Majesty's Works and Public Buildings. The subsequent alterations were again overseen by August Orth; an open terrace and a section of the garden was replaced with a great hall which connected the two wings of the palace and permitted the accommodation of up to 600 guests for social functions.

As time went by the Palais was increasingly overshadowed by the surrounding buildings. By 1907 the Hotel Adlon, occupying the site of the Palais Redern (originally designed by Karl Friedrich Schinkel), towered five storeys above the embassy. The hotel then bought and integrated the neighbouring Hotel Reichshof at 70a Wilhelmstrasse. The resulting smell and noise from the kitchens and loss of light led the last ambassador before the Second World War, Sir Neville Meyrick Henderson, to comment that the embassy was "cramped, dirty and dark". By Henderson's time the embassy had long outgrown its premises and on the outbreak of war in 1939 a new site, large enough to accommodate all of the embassy's functions, was sought in exchange for the existing building.

== Fate of the Palais ==
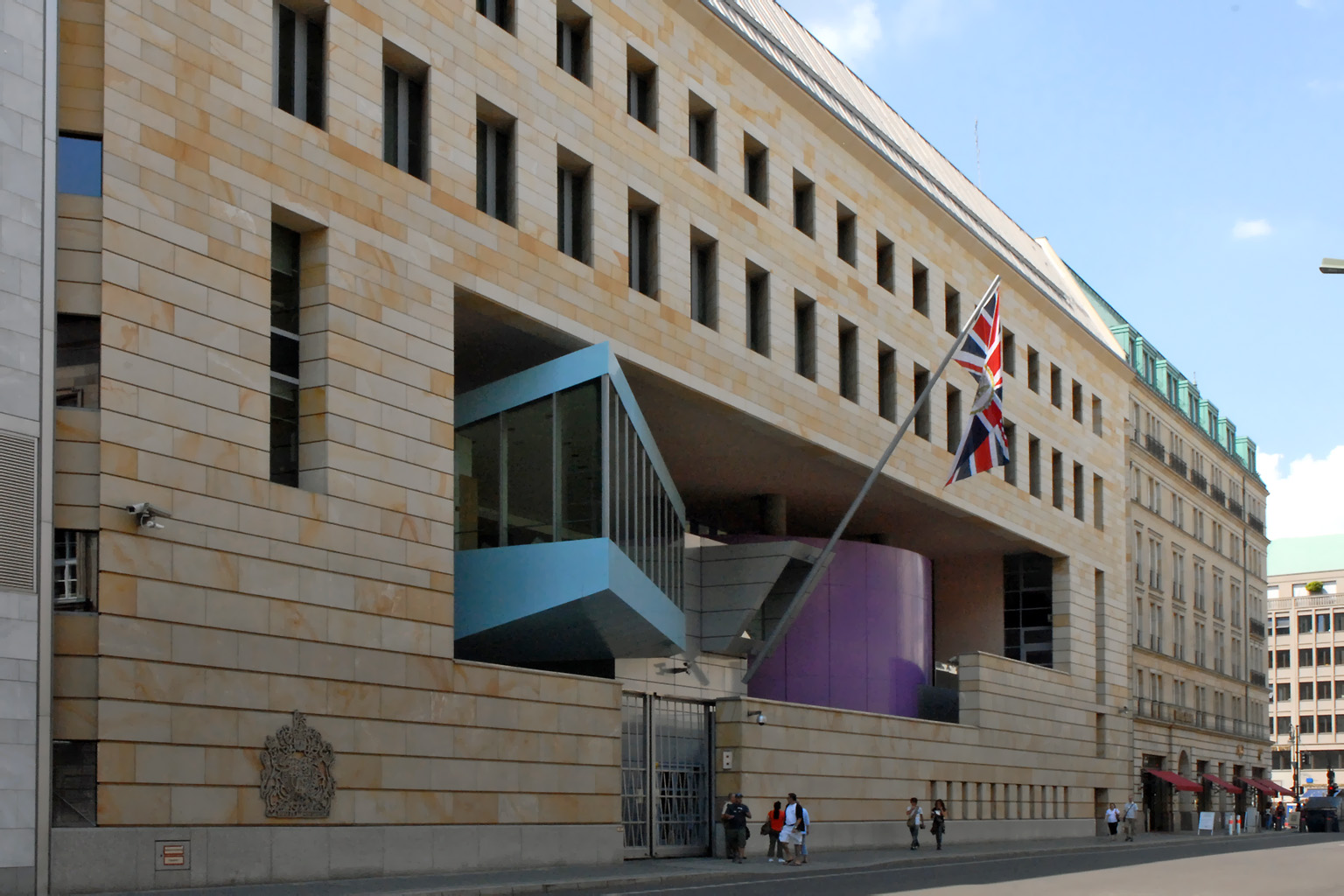
The new British embassy building

The embassy was closed at the outbreak of World War II and the German Ministry for Food occupied the building. Despite having survived a fire in revolution-torn Berlin in 1919, the building was severely damaged by Allied air raids in 1943, leaving it in ruins. A visiting British official in 1945 found nothing intact except the front gate "with the British coat of arms" — and the "remains of my old Vauxhall in the garage." The ruined building was pulled down by the East German authorities in 1950 despite being listed as a historic building.

Between 1949 and 1991 the British Ambassador to the German Federal Republic was based in Bonn. There was also a British Embassy to the German Democratic Republic in a different area of Berlin. The vacant plot of land remained undeveloped until after German reunification when the decision was made to return the British diplomatic mission to Berlin. The new British Embassy building opened in 1998 in the same location as the Palais and two adjoining properties, and retained the gate as a feature in the atrium, overlooking the main staircase.

== Description of the building ==
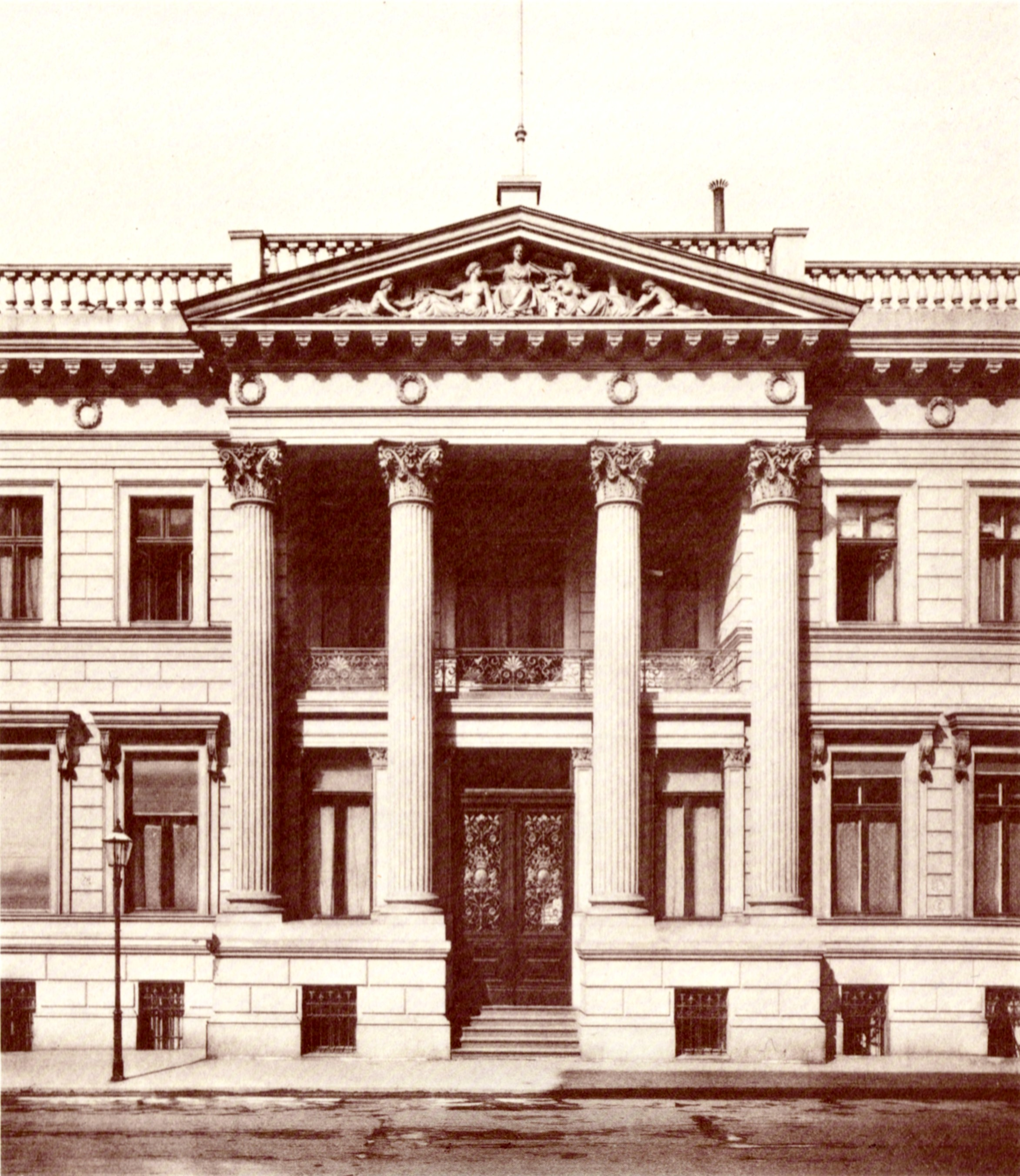
Photograph of the portico, ca. 1890

=== Façade ===
The façade to Wilhelmstrasse made a grand impression, the portico in the centre of the façade rose 2 storeys. Four Corinthian sandstone columns carried a pediment whose tympanum featured a bas-relief with five figures arranged in an unknown theme. Historical photographs show a central, winged figure, which is perhaps an allegory for the arts. To the right of centre sat a female figure with a Caduceus; this ancient symbol of commerce, associated with the Greek god Hermes, the messenger for the gods, conductor of the dead and protector of merchants and thieves, was cruelly apt to describe the eventual fate of the 'Railway King'. Porticos in the 1860s were an unusual motif in Berlin and were much more common in the Palladian buildings in England, where Strousberg had spent his youth.

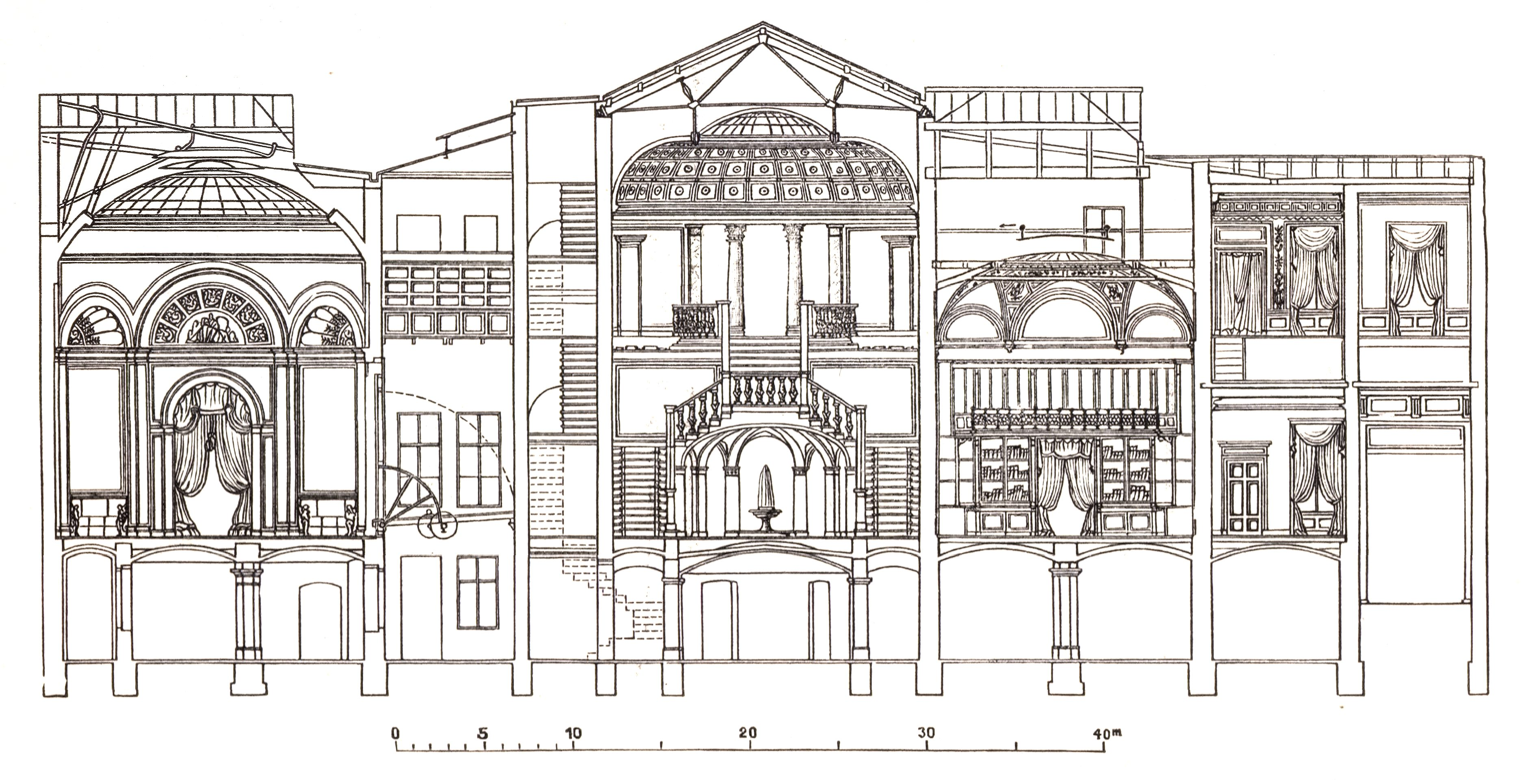
North-South section through the front of the building: On the left is the ballroom with the gas-lighting and the folding-down wall. In the middle is the vestibule to the right of which is the library. To the far right at ground level is the passage. Design drawing by August Orth, c.1884.

Five windows flank either side of the portico to create a simple, clean and balanced façade. To the north side of the building, in place of the outermost windows to the cellar and ground floor, a double swing gate was located behind which was a passage which led into a yard for the coaches. The partially grilled windows to the basement extended under the road level. The first floor windows received stone surrounds and the high windows of the entertainment rooms on the ground floor were also provided with small bracketed canopies. A balustrade extended over the entire length of the facade above the entablature. Other than the laurel wreaths below the bracketed sandstone cornice, the facade has no other sculpted ornamentation.

=== Ground floor ===
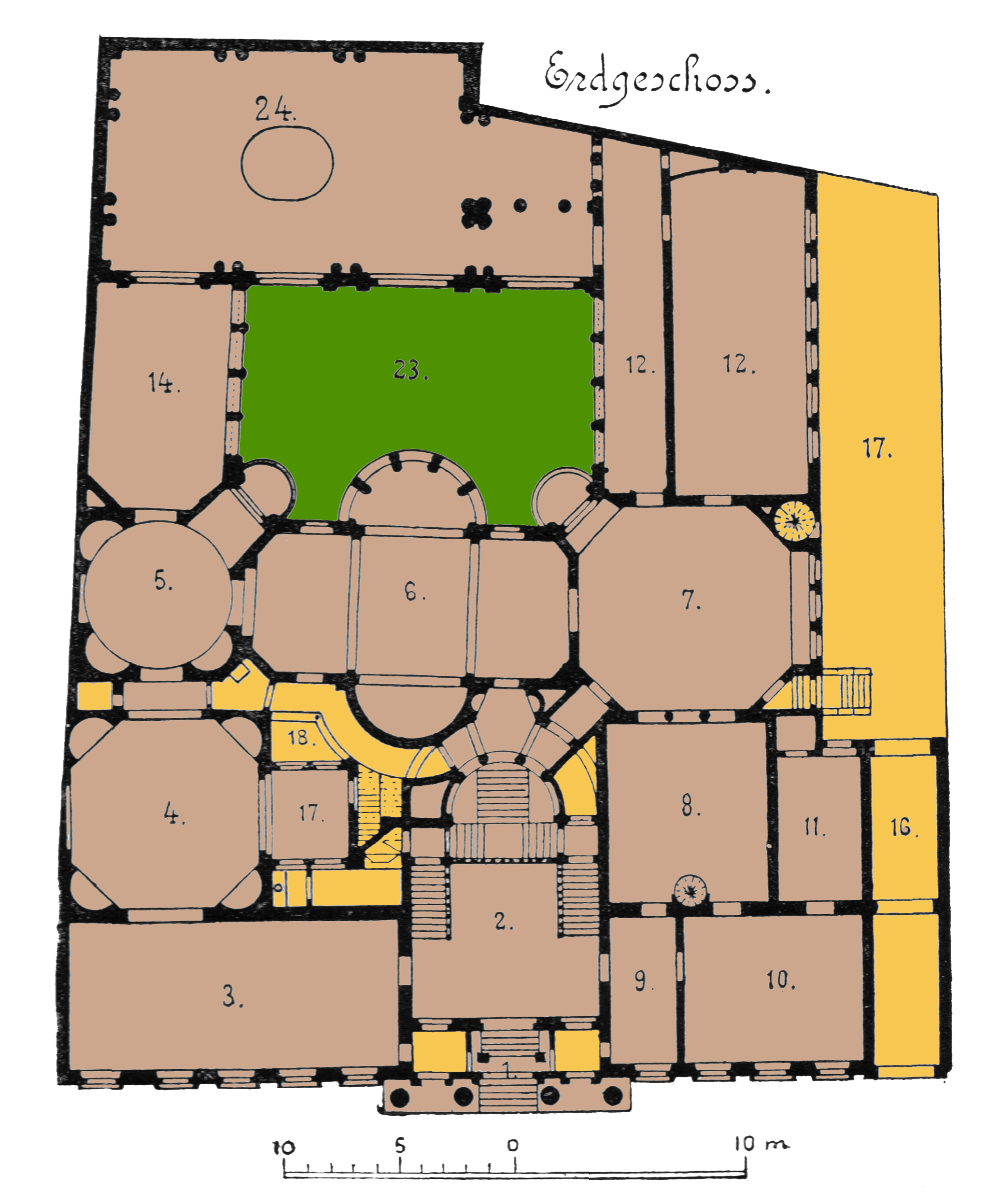

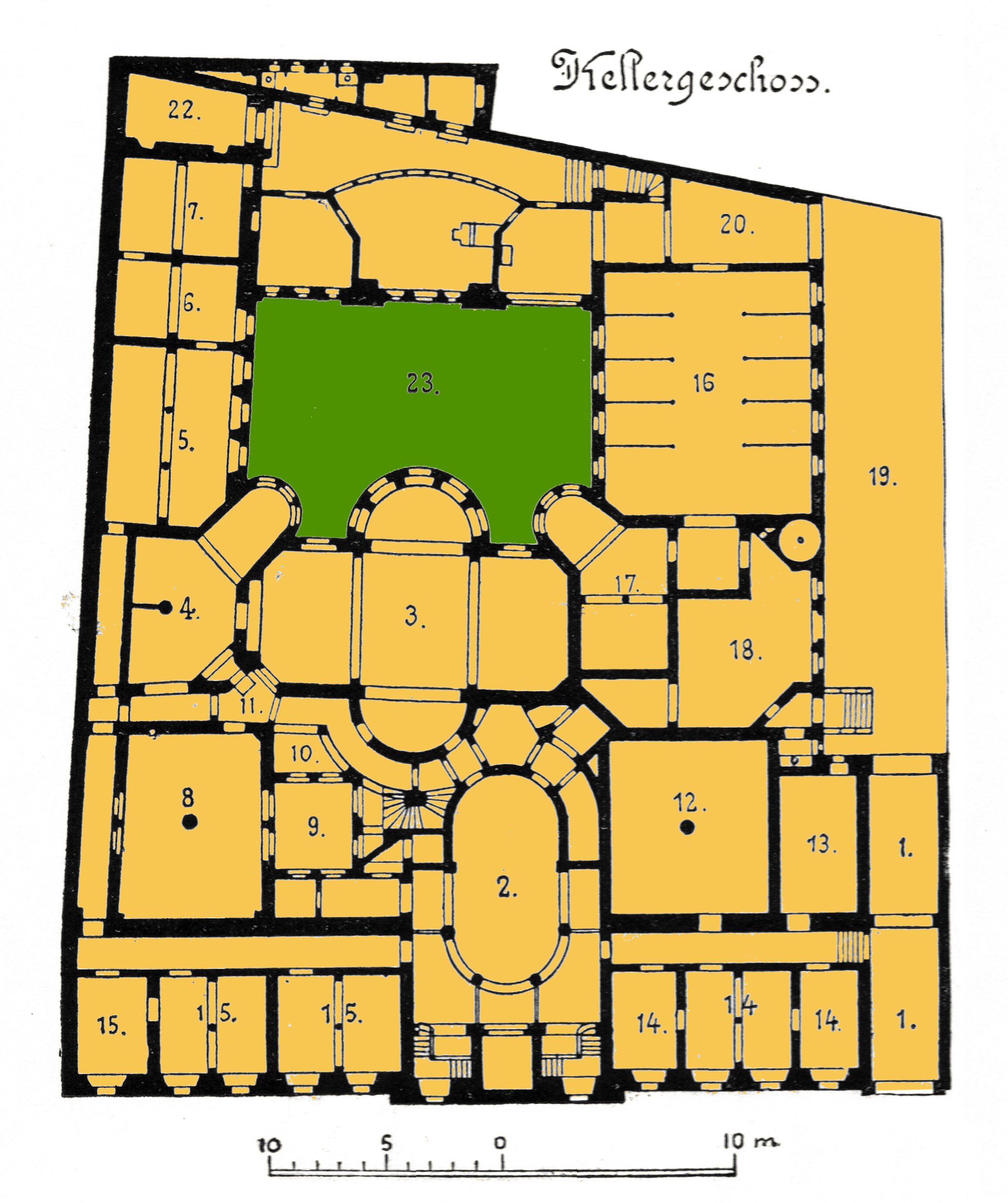

Ground floor plan:
After the 1884 alterations.

1 Entrance 2 Vestibule 3 Reception room 4 Ballroom 5 Drawing room 6 Dining room 7 Billiards room 8 Library 9 Antechamber 10 Ambassadors work room11 Bedroom 12 Art gallery 14 Antechamber 16 Passage 17 Courtyard with glazed roof 18 Buffet room 23 Courtyard 24 Great hall

Basement plan:
After the 1884 alterations.

1 Passage 2 Servants dining room 3 Kitchen 4 utility room 5 Laundry room with washing machine 6 Ironing room 7 Mangle room 8 Larder 9 Lightwell 10 Washroom 11 Elevator 12 Boiler room 13 Wine cellar 14 Coachman's accommodation 15 Servants room 16 Stable 17 Tack room 18 Horse feed store 19 Covered courtyard (Coachhouse) 20 Passage 22 Grotto 23 Courtyard garden

Visitors would ascend the stairs, walk through the portal in the Portico and arrive in a vestibule which extended vertically for two storeys and was lit by a skylight in a coffered, oval domed ceiling. At night time the space was illuminated with gas lights with movable shades. The two flights of marble stairs united at a landing over which was a half dome. From there the stairs extended to running on both sides of the upper floor. The stair's balusters were of biscuit porcelain. The reception room to the left of the vestibule, extended the length of all five windows of the south wing and led to the ballroom, an octagonal room with four rounded niches in the corners. A skylight illuminated the windowless room with a similar gas lamp as the vestibule, providing nighttime lighting. The panelled north wall could be folded down into the adjoining lightwell such that it spanned the well. Again with a glass roof, the additional space was used to provide accommodation for musicians or other performers. The connecting drawing room linked the ballroom via a further anteroom, the former conservatory, with the great hall. This opulent room was built after the British bought the embassy. They employed August Orth to convert the old garden terrace on the west side of the building into a sumptuous state room. Paired marble corinthian pilasters and columns lined the walls and punctuated the glazing to the central courtyard and vaults rose over an entablature to support a flat ceiling decorated with rich ornamental carvings and painting. In 1877 the Berlin sculptor Otto Lessing created two stucco reliefs featuring dancing Maenads as part of the wall decoration for the great hall. Once again the lighting was provided by gas lamps with mobile shades integrated into the oval skylight, which simultaneously allowed ventilation.

The art gallery was another extravagance of Strousberg's for the display of his painting and sculpture collection. East of the gallery, the billiards room provided a convenient entertaining room, which led back through the walnut-panelled dining room to either the drawing room or into the library. Above the library's panelling, which was again carved from walnut, were murals and a skylight set into the ceiling. At night this room, like the others, was lit by gas light. The rest of the Palais's ground floor accommodation served as anterooms and work rooms for the ambassador. Above the small windows of the servants' quarters in the basement; the windows of the great hall, its anteroom and the portrait gallery, stood more than 3 metres tall, overlooking and visually connected the rooms with each other and the gardens in the large courtyard. The facades that faced onto this courtyard were given a unifying treatment with Corinthian columns dividing the glazing. Originally it was open to the west, where a curved terrace opened onto a garden. Its location can still be discerned in the plan of the basement. Its plan shape can still be discerned in the plan of the basement. The terrace was adjacent to the garden of the Palais Redern and effectively extended the small garden of the Palais Strousberg into the generous garden of the Palais Redern.

=== Basement ===
The store rooms, work rooms, servants quarters and ancillary rooms were located in the basement. With a floor to ceiling height approaching 3 metres it allowed the rooms that faced the street to be lit by natural light without the need for a lightwell, and so the face of the building could be kept close to the back of the footpath. The passageway to the north of the building led to a roofed courtyard which served as a coach house and also ramped down half a storey to the level of the basement. Stairs led down from the passageway to the basement on the Wilhelmstraße side of the building to enable easy access for servants and the necessary deliveries. The adjacent western wing of the building housed the stables, tack and fodder rooms. Along Wilhelmstraße, the coachmen's and servants quarters were lit by low windows at street level. In the basement, directly under the vestibule was the servants' hall. The kitchen and its associated accommodation such as the scullery, pantries and wine cellar occupied the largest area in basement. A dumbwaiter carried meals up to the buffet beside the ballroom on the ground floor. In addition to the wine cellar, the boiler for the hot water heating was favourably located for both goods deliveries and the entrance to the servant's quarters. The wing along the southern boundary was occupied by the laundry. The washhouse with its washing machine is evidence for the advanced technical sophistication the building was designed with in 1868. The grotto in the remaining corner of the southern wing was a remnant of the original garden before the great ballroom was built over the garden.

=== Upper floor ===
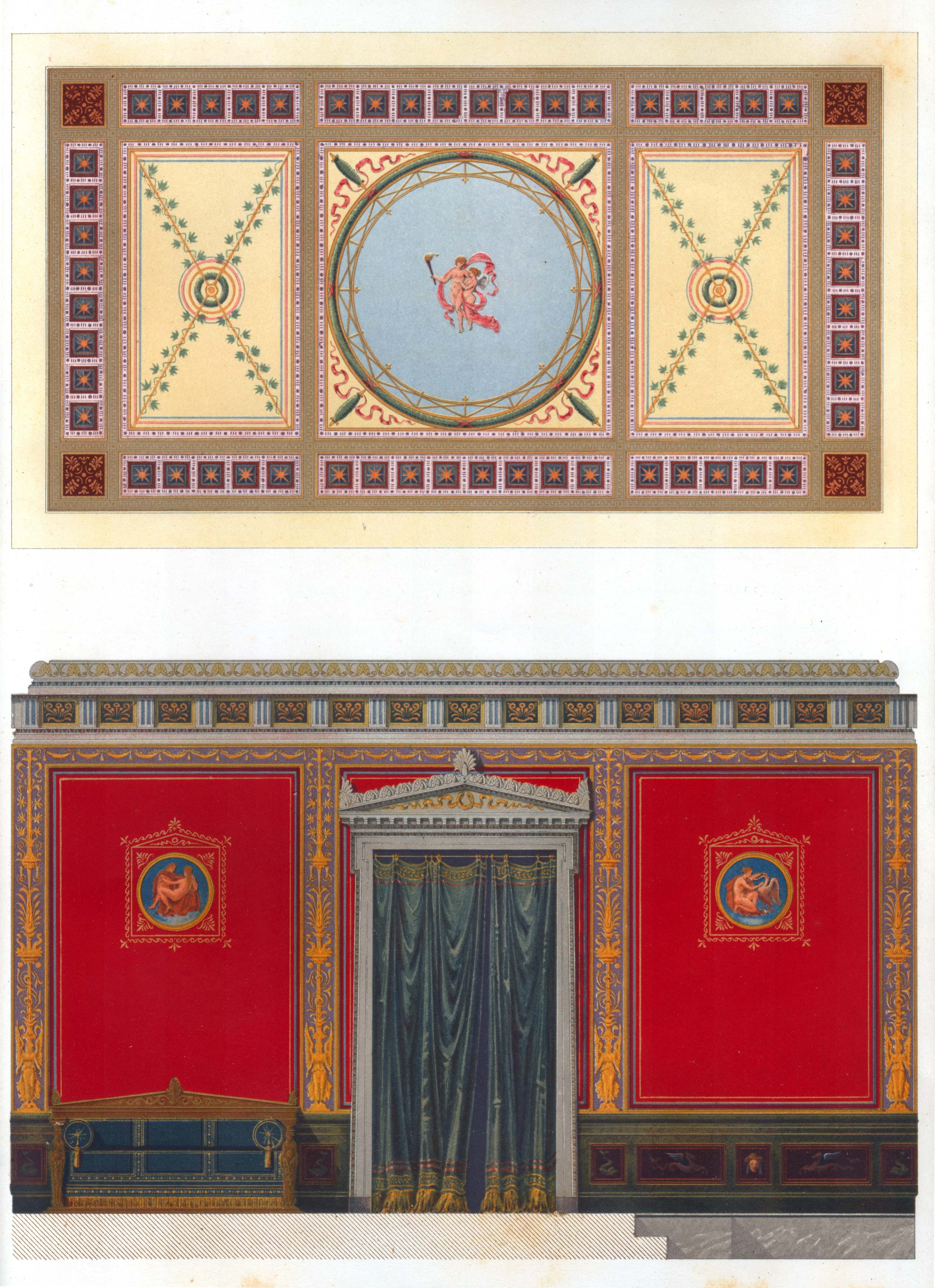
August Orth's designs for the wall and ceiling decoration of the bathroom based upon studies of Pompeii

The upper floor contained the sleeping accommodation, lavatories, bathrooms, dressing rooms and children's rooms for the large Strousberg family. The central hot water system, a feature which only a handful of buildings in Berlin in the late 1860s possessed, (Note: Most of these were public buildings such as the Neues Museum) was an indication of the building's modernity. Examples of the classically inspired interior decoration can be seen in the designs for the bathroom, where Roman Pompeii style wall paintings graced the walls (right). The more senior domestic staff – the nanny and governess – were also housed on the upper floor.
