= August Orth =

German architect

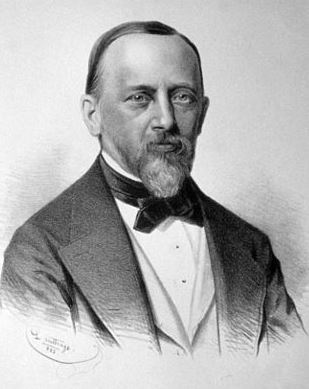
August Orth; portrait by Adolf Dauthage (1883)

August Friedrich Wilhelm Orth (25 July 1828, Windhausen - 11 May 1901, Berlin) was a German architect and designer.

== Life and work ==
He was the son of a manor tenant. In 1834, his family relocated to Korbach. After graduating from secondary school there, in 1848, he attended the Technical University of Braunschweig, where he studied architecture. He also studied painting at the local art school. In 1850, he transferred to the Bauakademie in Berlin. His instructors there included Friedrich August Stüler, Heinrich Strack, Karl Bötticher and Wilhelm Stier, who introduced him to the newer trends. In 1854, he passed the examination for construction manager. Unable to find work immediately, he chose instead to pursue his artistic studies, at the Prussian Academy of Arts.

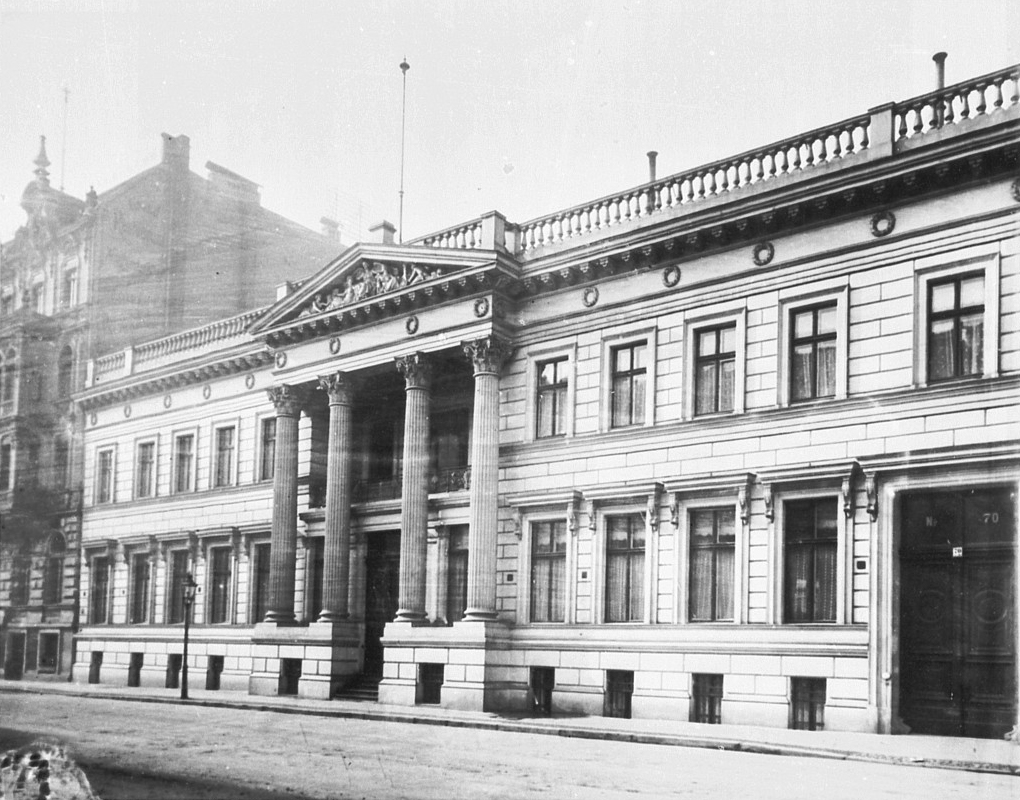
Palais Strousberg; demolished in 1950

He attempted to establish himself as an architect by entering competitions. In 1855, he submitted a design for a prince's palace then, in 1856, won the Schinkel Prize, for designing a Romanesque church. After a study trip throughout Germany, he performed some professional work for the Bergisch-Markisch Railway Company, and passed his Master Builder examination at the Prussian Academy in 1858.

More study trips followed; to France and Italy. From 1861 to 1862, he worked for Bergisch-Markisch again, then found employment with the Berlin–Görlitz Railway Company, becoming the head of their technical office in 1868. He then opened his own architectural firm. His most important client was the railway magnate, Bethel Henry Strousberg. He designed and built two of his homes: the Palais Strousberg on Wilhelmstraße in Berlin, and his family estate, Schloss Zbirow, in Bohemia. He also designed buildings at the Zentralvieh- und Schlachthof (slaughterhouse), for a company in which Strousberg had controlling interest.

Since 1865, he had been interested in experimenting with room acoustics, and employed what he learned in the design of several churches; notably the Zion Church, the Gethsemane Church, and the Emmaus Church in Berlin, as well as the Christmas Church in Bethlehem.

From 1871 to 1873, he developed a proposal for a "Berliner Centralbahn", a four-track, circular, light-rail system, but it was viewed as impractical. From 18772 to 1877, he served on the board of the "Architektenvereins zu Berlin" (Architects' Association). In 1877, he became a "Baurat" (Building Official), and was promoted to Geheimrat in 1893. He was awarded the Order of the Red Eagle, 4th class, in 1884. He was also a member of the Prussian Academy, and an honorary member of the Academy of Fine Arts, Vienna.

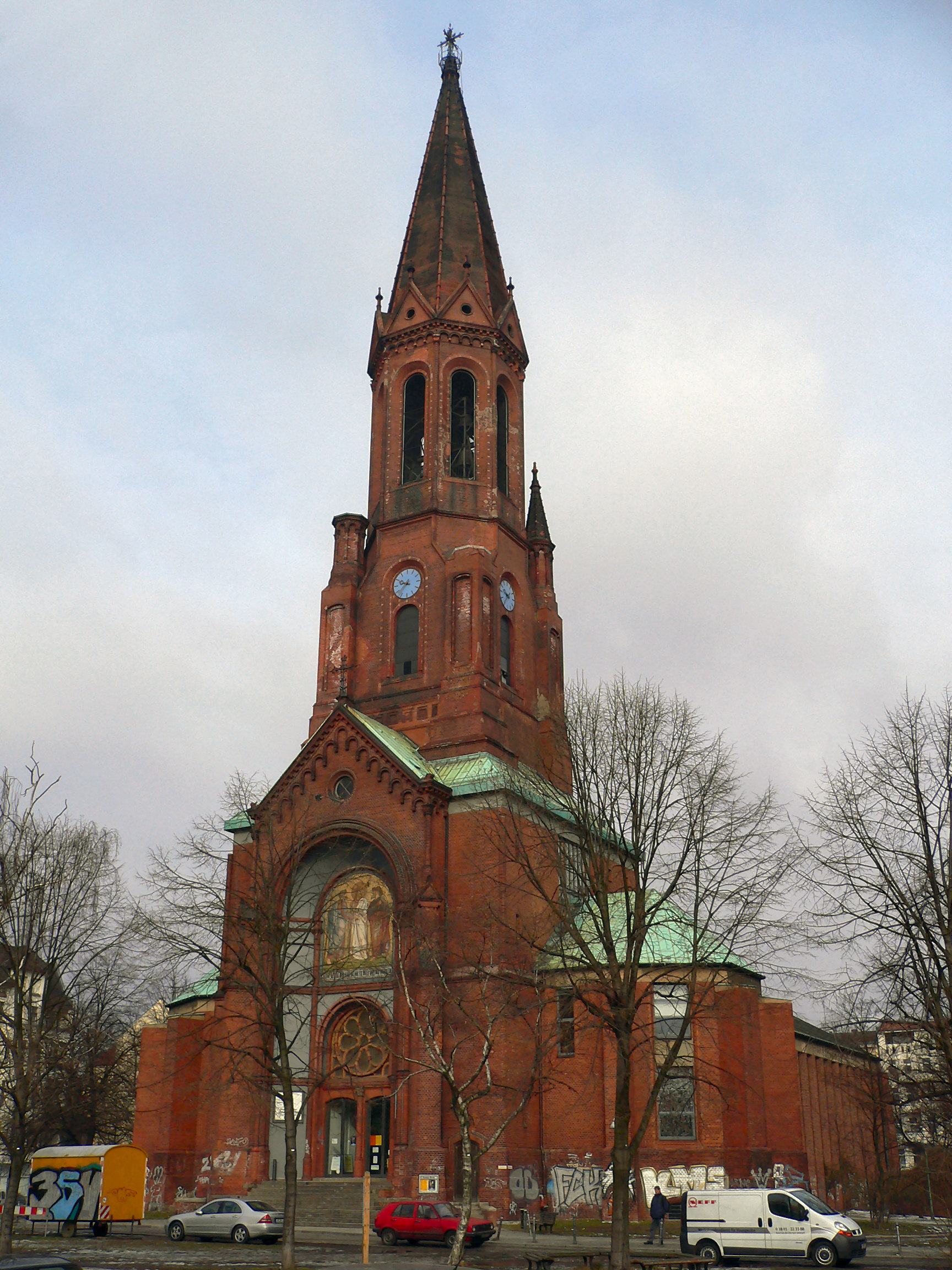
Emmaus Church
