= Bethel Henry Strousberg =

German railway entrepreneur (1823–1884)

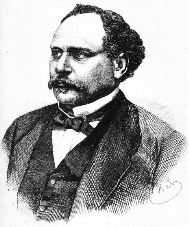
- Bethel Henry Strousberg, c. 1860
- Born: Baruch Hirsch Strausberg; 20 November 1823; Neidenburg, Prussia
- Died: 31 May 1884 (aged 60); Berlin, Germany
- Other name: Barthel Heinrich Strousberg
- Occupation: Industrialist
- Spouse: Mary Ann Swan (m. 1845)

Bethel Henry Strousberg (20 November 1823 – 31 May 1884) was a German Jewish industrialist and railway entrepreneur during Germany's rapid industrial expansion in the 19th century. He cemented his social standing with the construction of the Palais Strousberg in Berlin's Wilhelmstrasse, built in 1867–1868 according to plans designed by August Orth, which later became the seat of the British Embassy.

== Life ==
Baruch Hirsch Strausberg was born at Neidenburg (present-day Nidzica, Poland) in the Province of East Prussia, he changed his first names to Barthel Heinrich whilst attending the Gymnasium (Secondary School) in Königsberg. After the early death of his father, he moved to London in September 1839, where he initially lived with his mother's brother Peter Gottheimer, who jointly owned a fancy goods business with his brother Lesser. A third brother, Berton Gottheimer, was also in London in the same business. Strousberg anglicized his name to Bethel Henry and converted to Christianity. On 13 March 1845, he married Mary Ann Swan at St Bride's Church in Fleet Street.

In July 1847, Strousberg was working as an agent for several building societies and entrusted to handle member's payments. For some reason, he took an amount of money and booked a passage to America, but was found out when the steamer had to return to Southampton having loaded the wrong grade of coal. Strousberg was tried, found guilty, and served six months imprisonment with hard labour. A year after his release, the Strousberg's first son, Bethel Henry Jun., was born; and in January 1849, the three of them travelled to the USA returning in April 1850. Their second son Arthur was born in the autumn of that year. By 1854, Strousberg had become a successful publisher and journalist and was also a manager of an insurance company. Socially he was a Fellow of the Royal Geographical Society.

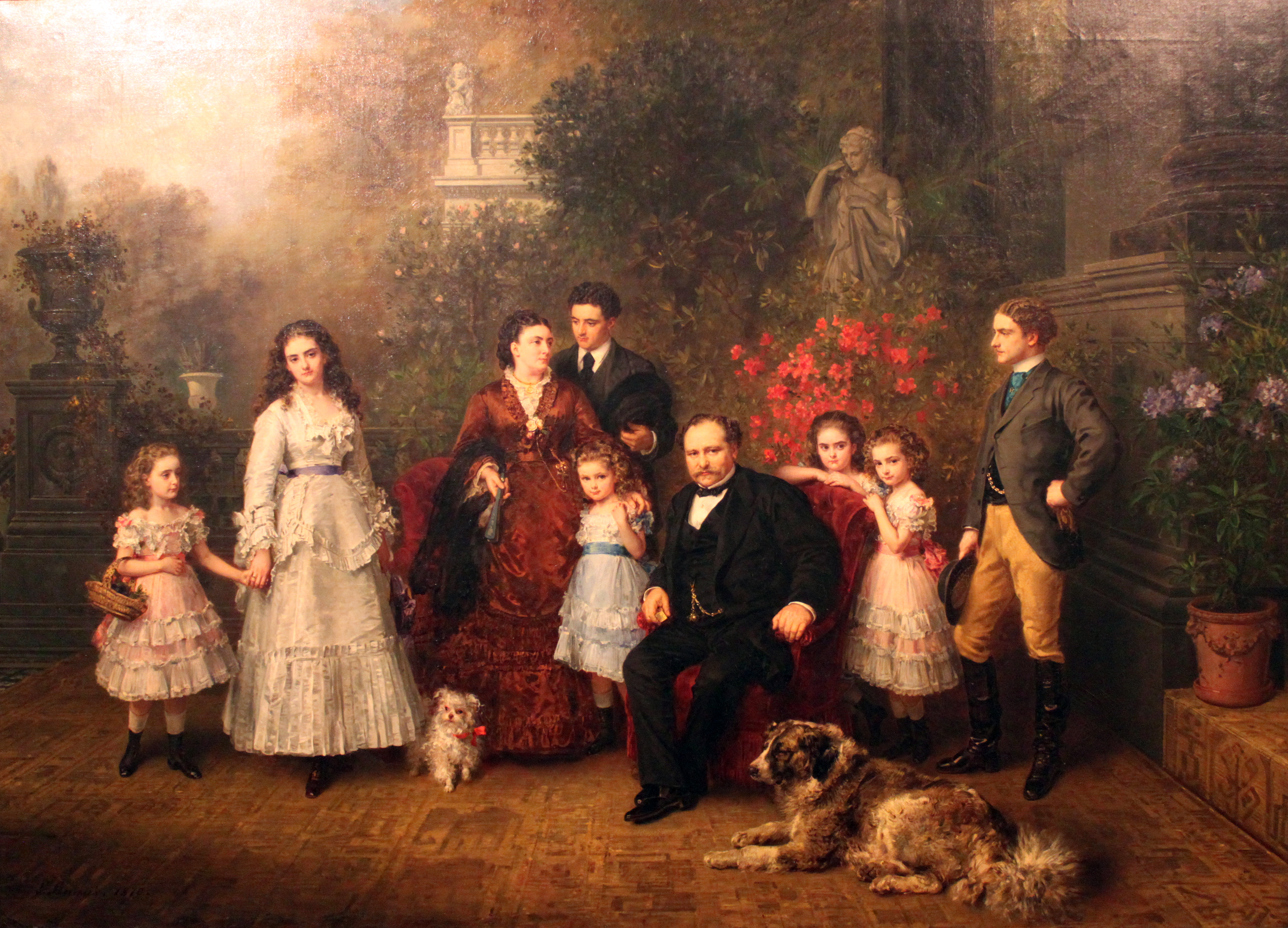
Strousberg and his family, painting by Ludwig Knaus, 1870

By the early 1860s, he had gone back to Germany and embarked on a second career as a railway entrepreneur and industrialist. With good contacts to the Prussian state government and backed by British financiers, he acquired the licence to build the East Prussian Southern Railway line from Tilsit to Insterburg in 1862, followed by the Berlin–Görlitz railway line opened in 1866/1867. He also founded the Hanover-Altenbeken Railway and the Halle-Sorau-Guben Railway companies in 1868. Strousberg engaged general contractors responsible for the construction of the railway lines, whom he paid with block of shares in instalments according to the building progress. He himself had to raise less capital while Strousberg's stockholders initially generated high profits, however, the nominal value of the shares reached dubious heights with regard to the actual costs of constructing. In 1868, he also purchased the iron foundry and engineering works of Georg Egestorff in Hanover, predecessor of Hanomag, and operated the Berlin cattle market.

Strousberg was generally known as a fair and caring employer. From 1867 to 1871, he was a member of the North German Reichstag for the constituency Königsberg 9, also including Allenstein and Rössel. Though a member of the Prussian Conservative Party, he did not join any faction in the Reichstag. In 1868, he acquired the castle of Mirošov (Miröschau) and the fiefdom of Zbiroh (Sbirow) in Bohemia. August Orth, engaged to build his Berlin city palace, was Strousberg's favoured architect and was also responsible for the Görlitzer Bahnhof entrance building and the renovation work at Zbiroh Castle. The castle is now an hotel and conference venue with guided tours of the restored building.

His business empire began a terminal decline during the Franco-Prussian War (1870–1871). Strousberg suffered a first setback after he reached a licence by the Hohenzollern prince Karl Eitel Friedrich, ruler of the Romanian United Principalities as Carol I since 1866, for another railway project bypassing the navigation on the Danube river largely controlled by Austria. The settlement with the Romanian government turned out to be ruinous, as Strousberg, due to several technical and financial difficulties, was not able to fulfil the railway contracts. He had to withdraw from Romania with major losses and was forced into liquidation in 1872.

His political opponents, led by the National Liberal Eduard Lasker, openly denounced his financing methods and his ties with the state government, enforcing the Prussian trade minister Count Itzenplitz to resign in 1873. Though Strousberg came out of the Panic of 1873 unscathed, he was declared bankrupt in 1875, with Adolph von Hansemann and Gerson von Bleichröder snapping up the majority of his railways for fractions of their worth. After having fled to Saint Petersburg, he had to stand trial in Russia for alleged fraudulent transactions with the cashing of due bills and granting of credits in 1876. He was deported and returned to Berlin, dividing his time between London and the manor of his son-in-law in Bromberg, whilst attempting his social rehabilitation with various projects and writing his memoirs.

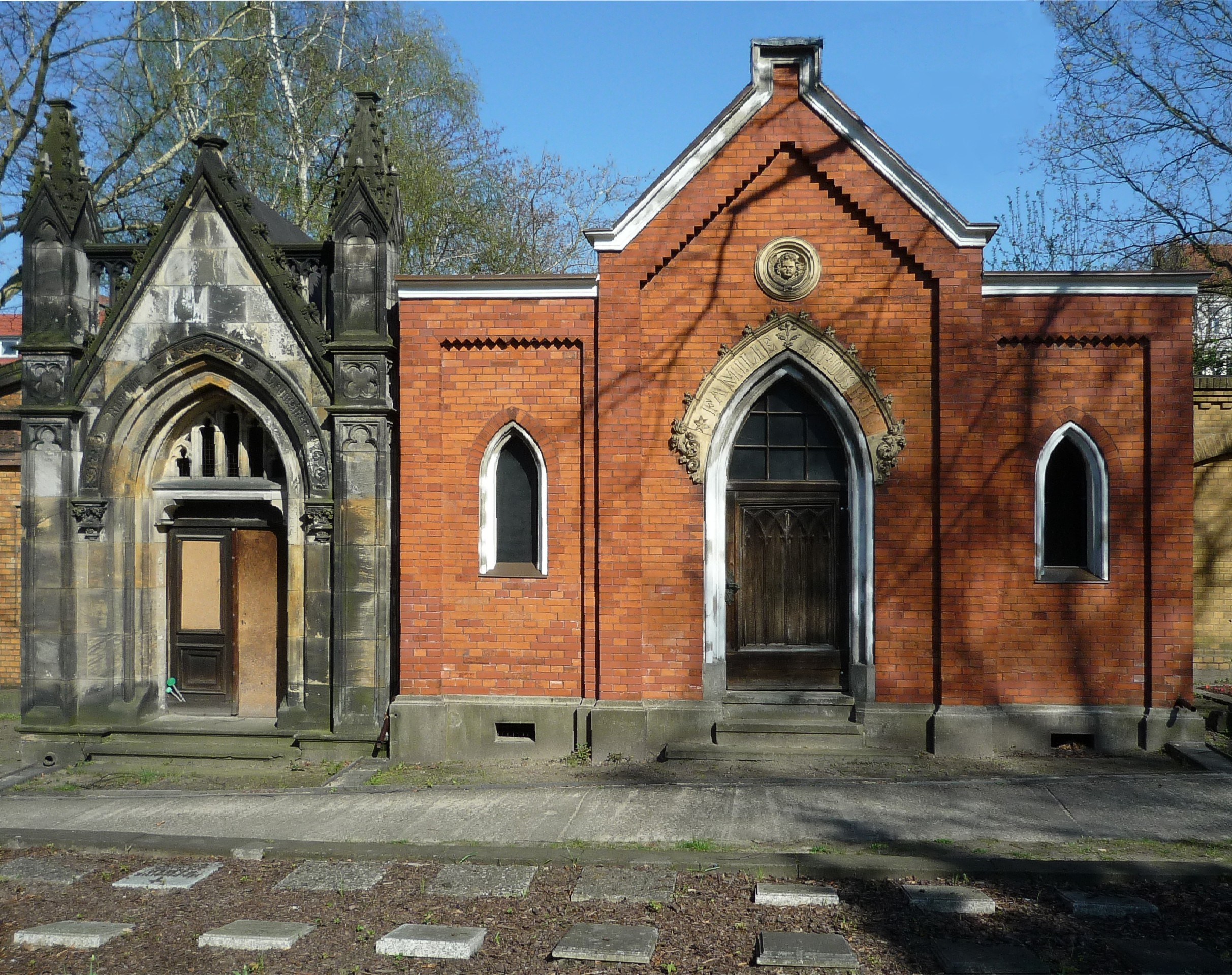
Strousberg family plot

Strousberg died of a heart attack in Berlin, in hard economic circumstances. His mausoleum is preserved on the Protestant Old St. Matthew's Cemetery in the Schöneberg district of Berlin.

== Bibliography ==
- Der europäische Eisenbahnkönig Bethel Henry Strousberg, Joachim Borchart, C.H. Beck, Munich 1991, ISBN 3-406-35297-9
- Der Eisenbahnkönig Bethel Henry Strousberg, Manfred Ohlsen, Verlag der Nation, Berlin 1987, ISBN 3-373-00003-3
- Der Eisenbahnkönig, oder, Rumänien lag in Linden : Materialien zur Sozialgeschichte des Arbeiterwohnungsbaus, Wolfgang Voigt, AG SPAK, München SPAK, 1982, ISBN 3-923126-15-8
- Hanomag Lokomotiven, Lothar Spielhoff, Podszun Motorbücher, Berlin 2004, ISBN 3-86133-352-X
- Iron Kingdom: The Rise and Downfall of Prussia, 1600-1947, Christopher Clark, Allen Lane, London, ISBN 0-7139-9466-5
- Aufstieg und Fall des "Eisenbahnkönigs" Bethel Henry Strousberg (Nº 5 in the series Miniaturen zur Geschichte, Kultur und Denkmalpflege Berlins), Horst Mauter, Interessengemeischaft für Denkmalpflege, Kultur und Geschichte der Hauptstadt Berlin, Kulturbund der DDR, Berlin 1981
- The Amazing Dr. Strousberg, Richard Hunt, 2009, ISBN 978-0-9561604-0-9
