= Reichshof Hotel Hamburg =

Hotel in Hamburg, Germany

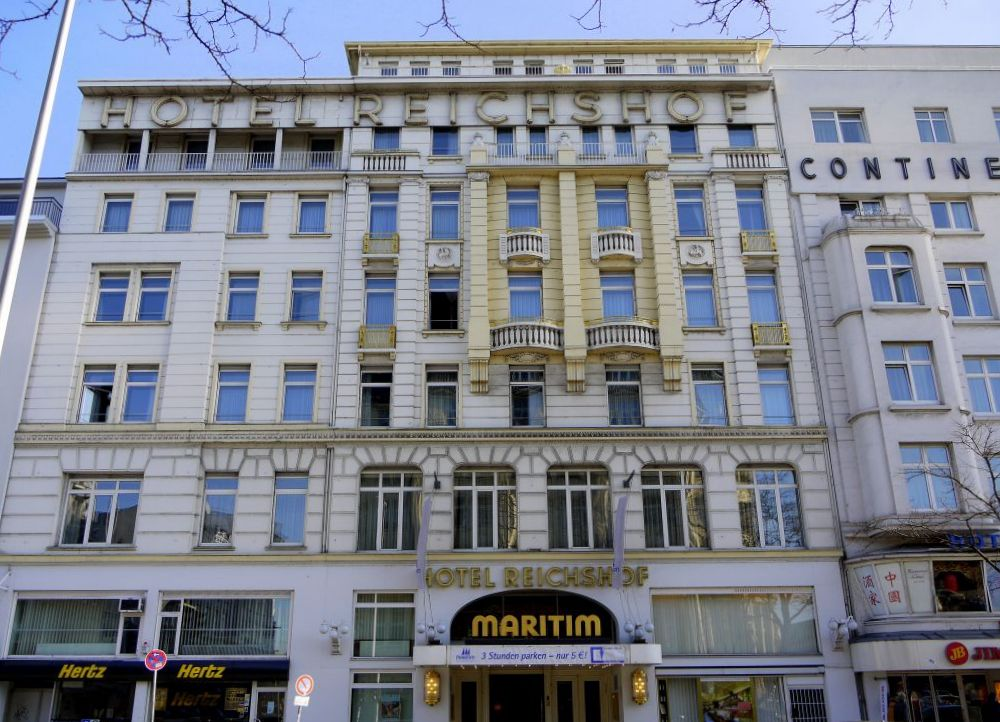
- Reichshof Hotel Hamburg

- Location within Hamburg Location within Germany

General information
- Type: Hotel
- Location: Kirchenallee 34-36, Hamburg, Germany
- Coordinates: 53.554766°N 10.008419°E
- Opened: 1910

Other information
- Number of rooms: 278

Website
- https://www.reichshof-hotel-hamburg.de/

The Hotel Reichshof is a historic hotel in Hamburg, Germany, opened in 1910. It is located in the heart of Hamburg city center, opposite the main railway station, close to the Deutsches Schauspielhaus.

== History ==
The first stone for the hotel was laid in 1906. The plot was then still on uncultivated ground, opposite the main railway station, which was the only completed development there. The Founder and builder of the hotel was Anton Emil Langer (1864-1928), former executive chef of the Ocean-Liners of the shipping company the HAPAG. The family already owned the hotel "Esplanade" and 27 more hotels.

The hotel was designed by architect Heinrich Mandix, in the reform style with baroque and classical appeal. At the opening in 1910 it was one of the largest hotels in Europe and the largest hotel in Germany. It was named in honor of Kaiser Wilhelm II. With running water, electricity and telephone connections in every room, it had one of the most high-tech equipment for that time. Pioneering technology were also the car garage and the hydraulic lifts. The hotel's dining room was designed by the ship outfitters Friese in the style of a luxury ocean liner.

After the death of Anton Emil Langer his wife Martha and son Herbert Emil ran the hotel, later his wife died. They still live in the family estate on the river Elbe.

The hotel was partly destroyed during World War II and rebuilt. It is now a listed building. A lot of the old-style elements are preserved in the original.

Maritim Hotels assumed management of the hotel in 1989 and renamed it the Maritim Hotel Reichshof. The hotel closed for renovations in May 2014. At that point, it had six floors with 303 rooms, including two suites with 45 square meters and a "themed room St. Pauli", with a total of 465 beds. It was equipped with swimming pool, sauna and steam room. There were also 14 meeting and banquet rooms with modern conference technology for up to 400 people.

It reopened on 17 July 2015 as the Reichshof Hamburg, Curio Collection by Hilton. The renovated hotel has 278 guest rooms, 6 junior suites and 3 One-Bedroom Suites, 10 conference and meeting rooms and a modern spa and fitness area.

On 27 July 2021, the hotel left the Curio Collection by Hilton. It operates today as an independent hotel.

== Gallery ==
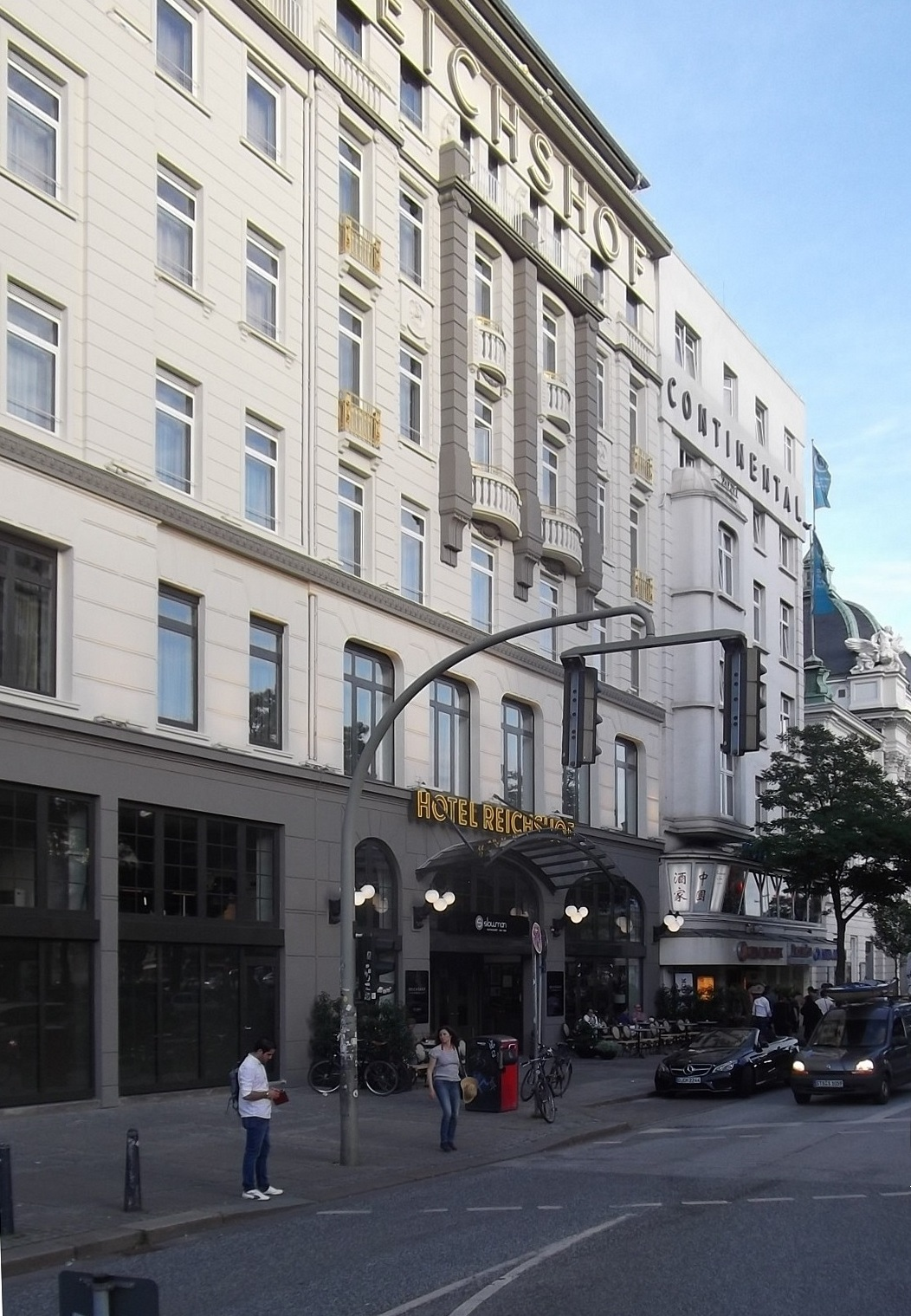
Reichshof Hotel Hamburg
