= Halbe, Brandenburg =

- Municipality
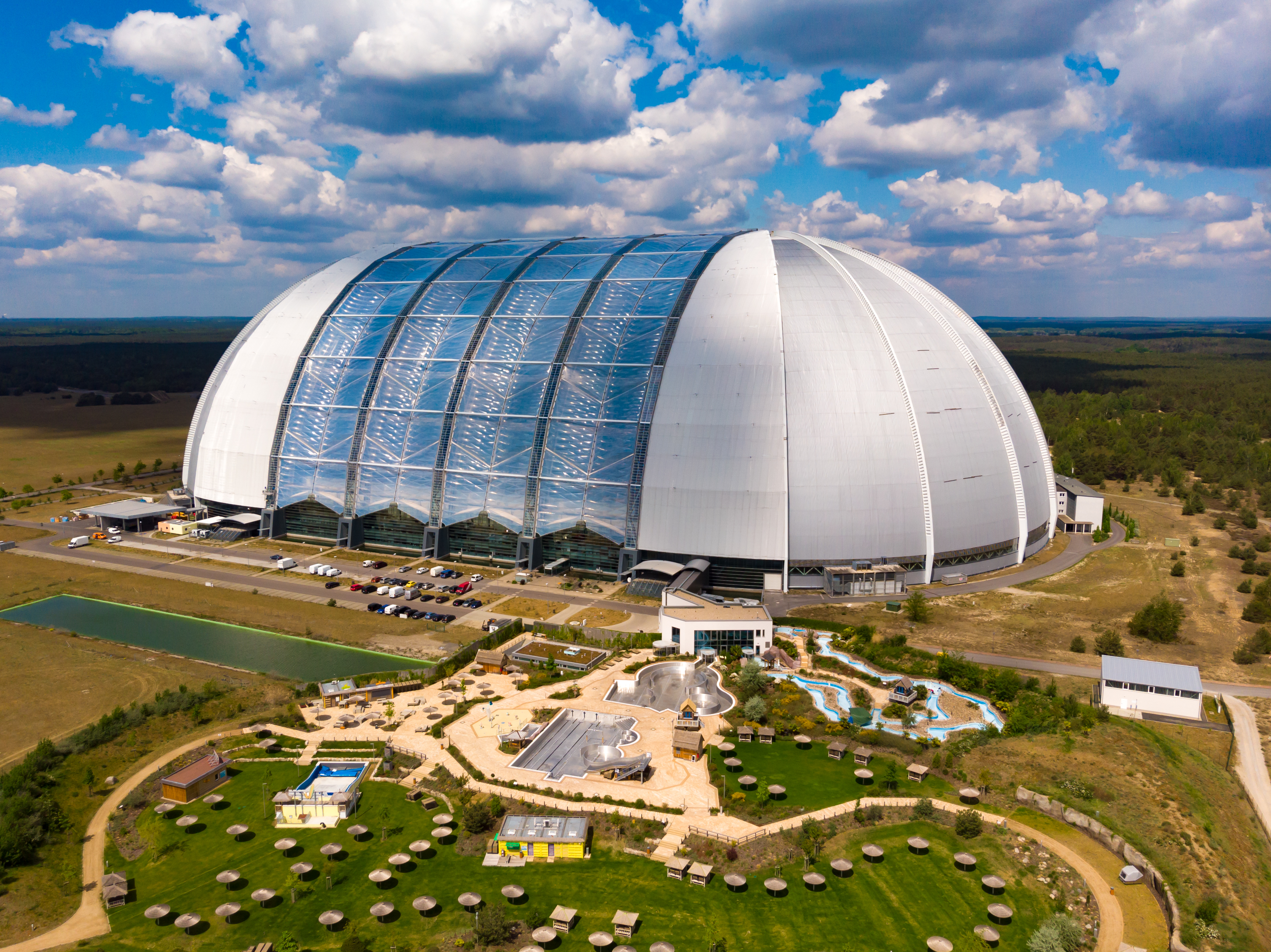
- Tropical Islands Resort in Kaben

- Coat of arms

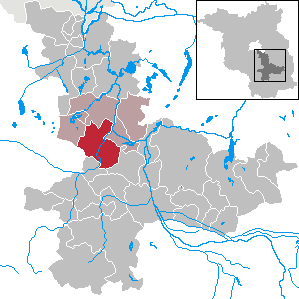
- Location of Halbe, Brandenburg within Dahme-Spreewald district
- Interactive map of Halbe, Brandenburg
- Location within Germany Location within Brandenburg
- Coordinates: 52°6′31″N 13°42′3″E
- Country: Germany
- State: Brandenburg
- District: Dahme-Spreewald
- Municipal assoc.: Schenkenländchen
- Subdivisions: 3 Ortsteile und 4 Gemeindeteile

Government
  - Mayor (2024–29): Sandro Kracht

Area
  - Total: 78.02 km^{2} (30.12 sq mi)
- Elevation: 35 m (115 ft)

Population (2025-12-31)
  - Total: 2,483
  - Density: 31.83/km^{2} (82.43/sq mi)
- Time zone: UTC+01:00 (CET)
  - Summer (DST): UTC+02:00 (CEST)
- Postal codes: 15757
- Dialling codes: 033765
- Vehicle registration: LDS
- Website: amt-schenkenlaendchen.de

Halbe (German pronunciation: [ˈhalbə]; Lower Sorbian Łobje) is a municipality in the Dahme-Spreewald district of Brandenburg, Germany. It is situated near the capital city Berlin and the Spreewald. Four other villages are part of Halbe: Briesen/Brand with the Tropical Islands resorts of Dom, Teurow, Freidorf and Oderin. Halbe was the site of the Battle of Halbe during the final days of the Second World War.

== Gallery ==
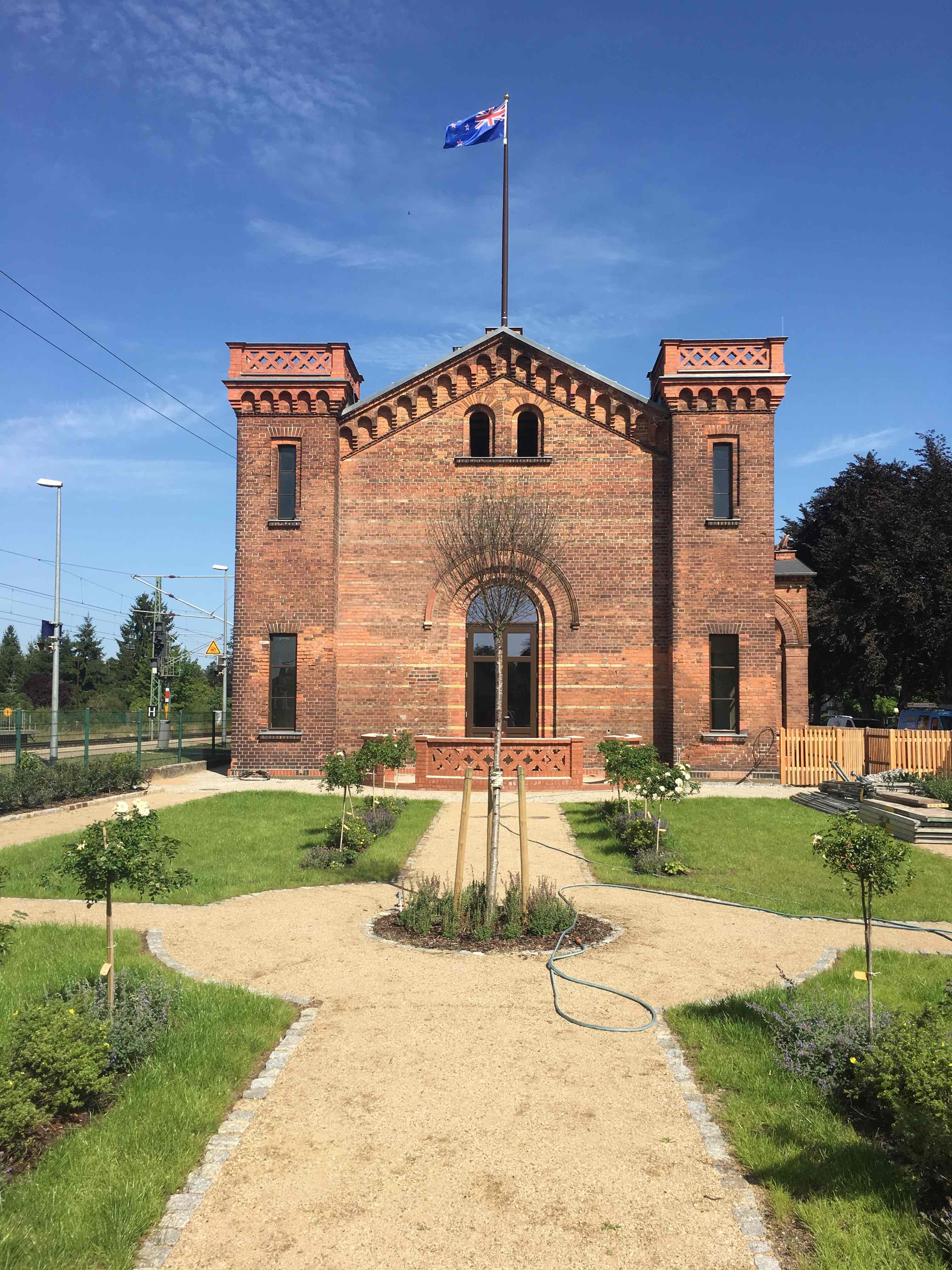
Kaiserbahnhof Halbe

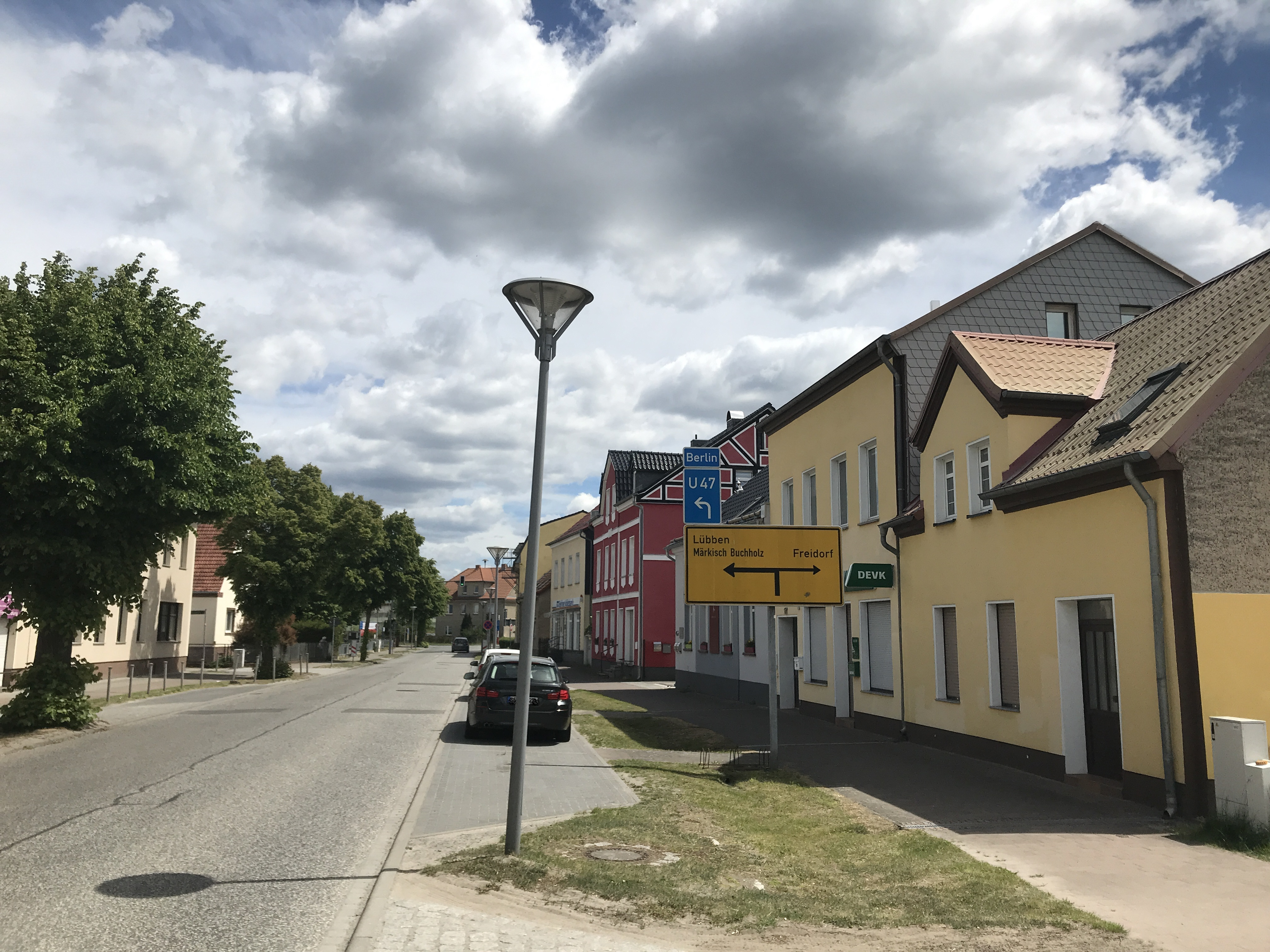
Inside Halbe, Teupitzer Straße

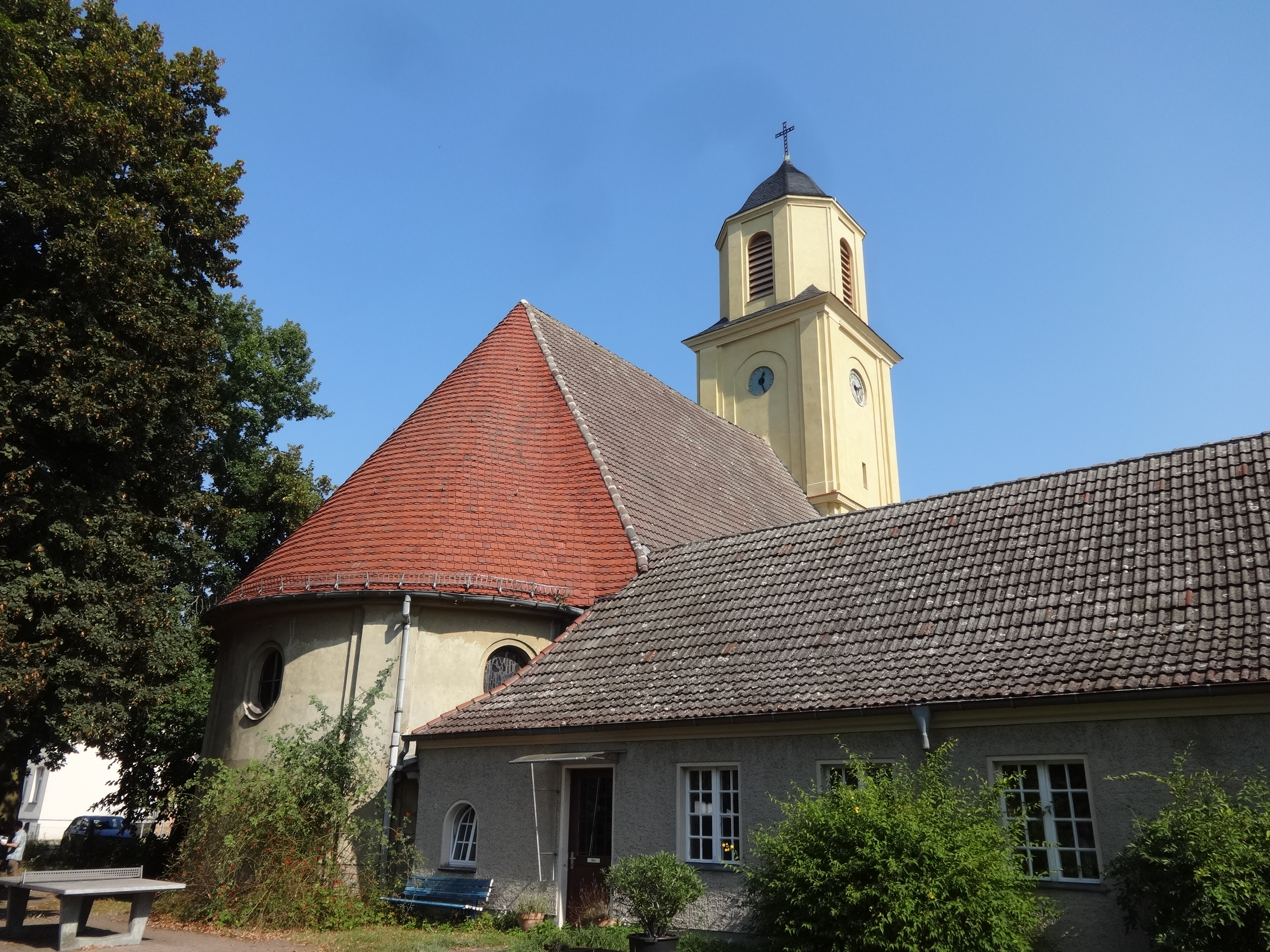
Halbe church

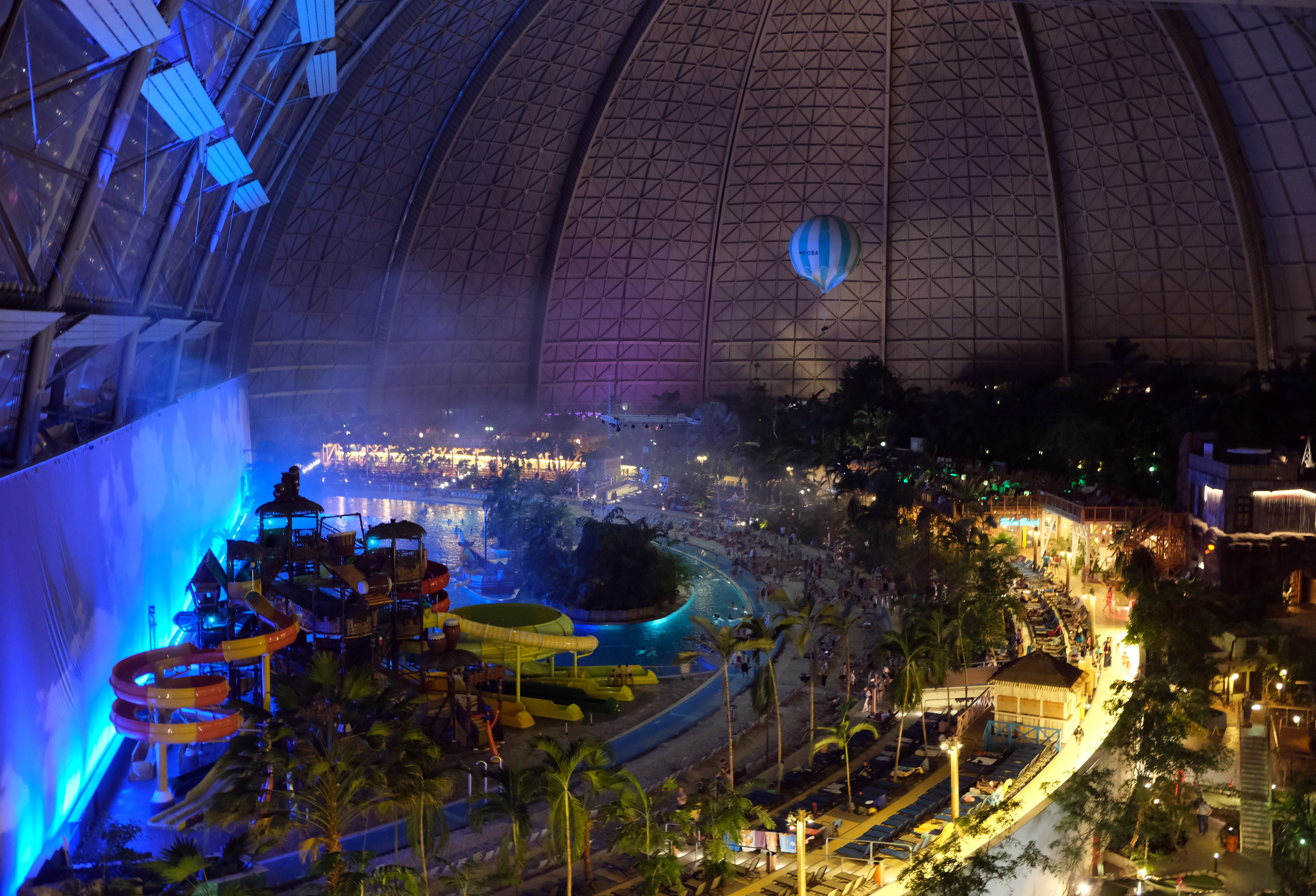
Inside Tropical Islands Resort

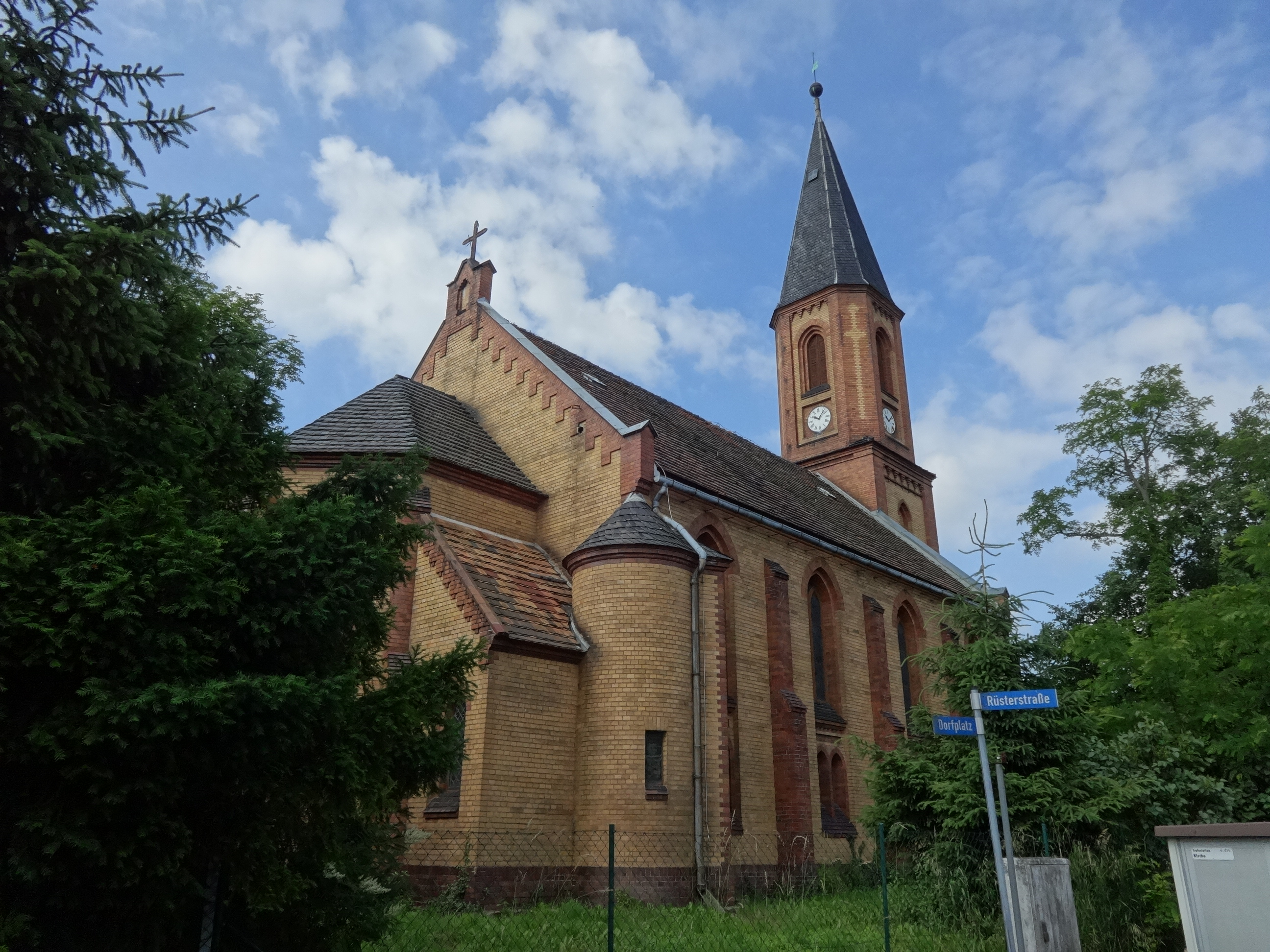
Oderin church

== Demography ==
Development of population since 1875 within the current boundaries (Blue line: Population; Dotted line: Comparison to population development of Brandenburg state; Grey background: Time of Nazi rule; Red background: Time of communist rule)

Halbe: Population development
within the current boundaries (2020)

Year	Pop.	±% p.a.
1875	1,573	—
1890	1,807	+0.93%
1910	2,476	+1.59%
1925	2,408	−0.19%
1933	2,422	+0.07%
1939	2,555	+0.89%
1946	3,031	+2.47%
1950	3,007	−0.20%
1964	2,648	−0.90%
1971	2,570	−0.43%
1981	2,264	−1.26%
1985	2,194	−0.78%
1989	2,133	−0.70%
1990	2,119	−0.66%
1991	2,117	−0.09%

Year	Pop.	±% p.a.
1992	2,098	−0.90%
1993	2,079	−0.91%
1994	2,112	+1.59%
1995	2,105	−0.33%
1996	2,134	+1.38%
1997	2,217	+3.89%
1998	2,262	+2.03%
1999	2,244	−0.80%
2000	2,266	+0.98%
2001	2,267	+0.04%
2002	2,240	−1.19%
2003	2,225	−0.67%
2004	2,360	+6.07%
2005	2,232	−5.42%
2006	2,219	−0.58%

Year	Pop.	±% p.a.
2007	2,194	−1.13%
2008	2,167	−1.23%
2009	2,169	+0.09%
2010	2,141	−1.29%
2011	2,194	+2.48%
2012	2,208	+0.64%
2013	2,150	−2.63%
2014	2,176	+1.21%
2015	2,615	+20.17%
2016	2,457	−6.04%
2017	2,402	−2.24%
2018	2,385	−0.71%
2019	2,331	−2.26%
2020	2,415	+3.60%

== See also ==
- The Battle of Halbe, which was fought in the last days of the Second World War.
- The Kaiserbahnhof Halbe, which was built for Kaiser Wilhelm I
