= Kaiserbahnhof Halbe =

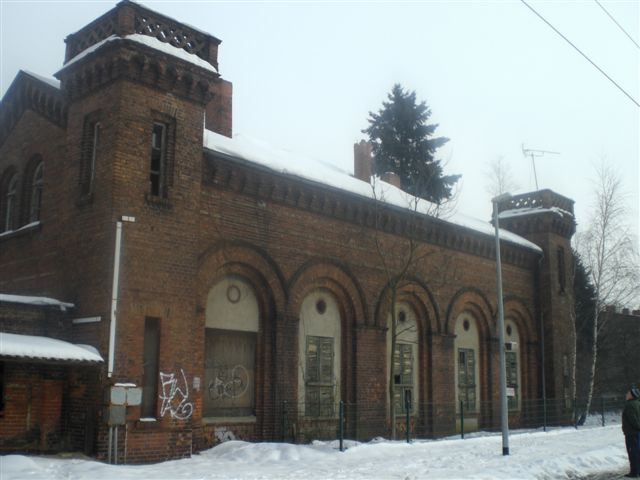
- Kaiserbahnhof Halbe, January 2010

General information
- Location: Halbe, Brandenburg, Germany
- Coordinates: 52.1086°N 13.7018°E
- System: Railway station
- Lines: Main line between Berlin and Cottbus

Construction
- Architect: August Orth

History
- Opened: 1865
- Closed: 1920 (for royal use)
Location

Kaiserbahnhof Halbe is a railway station located in Halbe, on the main line between Berlin, which begins at the Görlitzer railway station, to Cottbus in Brandenburg and on to Görlitz in Saxony. It was built during the reign of Kaiser Wilhelm I and used by his son Emperor Frederick III and his grandson Kaiser Wilhelm II between 1865 and 1912, when it as converted to offices and accommodation for railway workers. Having falling into disrepair in the 1990s it has now being restored to its 1865 state. Major works were completed in 2010, being the construction of a new roof and the restoration of two decorative towers at the north western and eastern corners of the building. In 2011, the first floor windows were repaired and all external brickwork repointed. In 2012, the ground floor windows and doors were restored with a start being made on the restoration of the large garden, to the south of the building. Since 2012 the restoration has been completed, with the 1865 building (the Altbau) having been fully restored. A new building to the north (the Neubau) has been built which is to house the kitchen, lavatories and ancillary facilities for the cafe's operation. The garden has been restored based on its 1865 design. The opening ceremony on 18 August 2019 was attended by Halbe's deputy mayor Michael Schnieke, the deputy New Zealand ambassador Alexandra Smithyman and guests which included more than 100 from New Zealand.

== Background ==
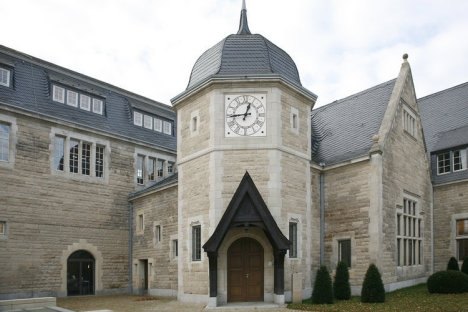
Kaiserbahnhof Potsdam

The Kaiserbahnhof Halbe is a receiver station, of which a number were built in Germany. A receiver train station is a separate building in a train station for highly placed individuals - in this case the German emperors or kaisers. This receiver train station was built in 1865 in the town of Halbe for the exclusive use of Germany's emperors until 1912 when the station was converted to civilian residential use. The Kaiserbahnhof Halbe lies just outside the town of Halbe which is about 40 km southeast of Berlin. East of the town is a level crossing from the main street which leads to Halbe's train station. Parallel to the railway track about 10 meters apart from each other to the north is the Public Building and Station to the south the extraordinary and historic listed property, the Royal train station building, also known as the Royal reception building. In older sources and postcards of the station it is known as the Emperor station or is designated the Imperial Hunting Seat for the Hohenzollern family. Separate receiver stations are known in Germany as Furstenbahnhofs. Others are the Kaiserbahnhof at Potsdam, at Bad Homburg and at Kierberg.

== History ==
The history of Halbe station is closely linked with the development of the Prussian railway system after 1838 the first Prussian railroad track had already been opened from Berlin to Potsdam. In the following decade, almost further connections to the capital Berlin were developed. A second rapid development phase of the railway began in the 1860s. In little more than a decade the number of the tracks emanating from Berlin doubled.

== Cottbus-Görlitz line ==
The first new building of this second construction phase was the Berlin connection with Cottbus from Görlitz. A royal decree of 1858 smoothed the way for its construction. Bethel Henry Strousberg, the railway king of this time, formed the Berlin Görlitz Railway Company. A cabinet order of May 1864 approved the building of the railway by Strousberg's corporation. The initial distance to Cottbus was completed in 1866, and to Görlitz in 1867. The line's main station in Kreuzberg, Berlin was designed in 1866-68 by August Orth.

The Halbe train station on this line was used from 1866 until just after the First World War in 1920 when the building was adapted for other uses, primarily with the installation of partitions and with the height of the rooms being reduced with false ceilings. Furthermore, a single-storey porch was added to the structure to the south and the goods sheds to the north was extended.

== Architect ==
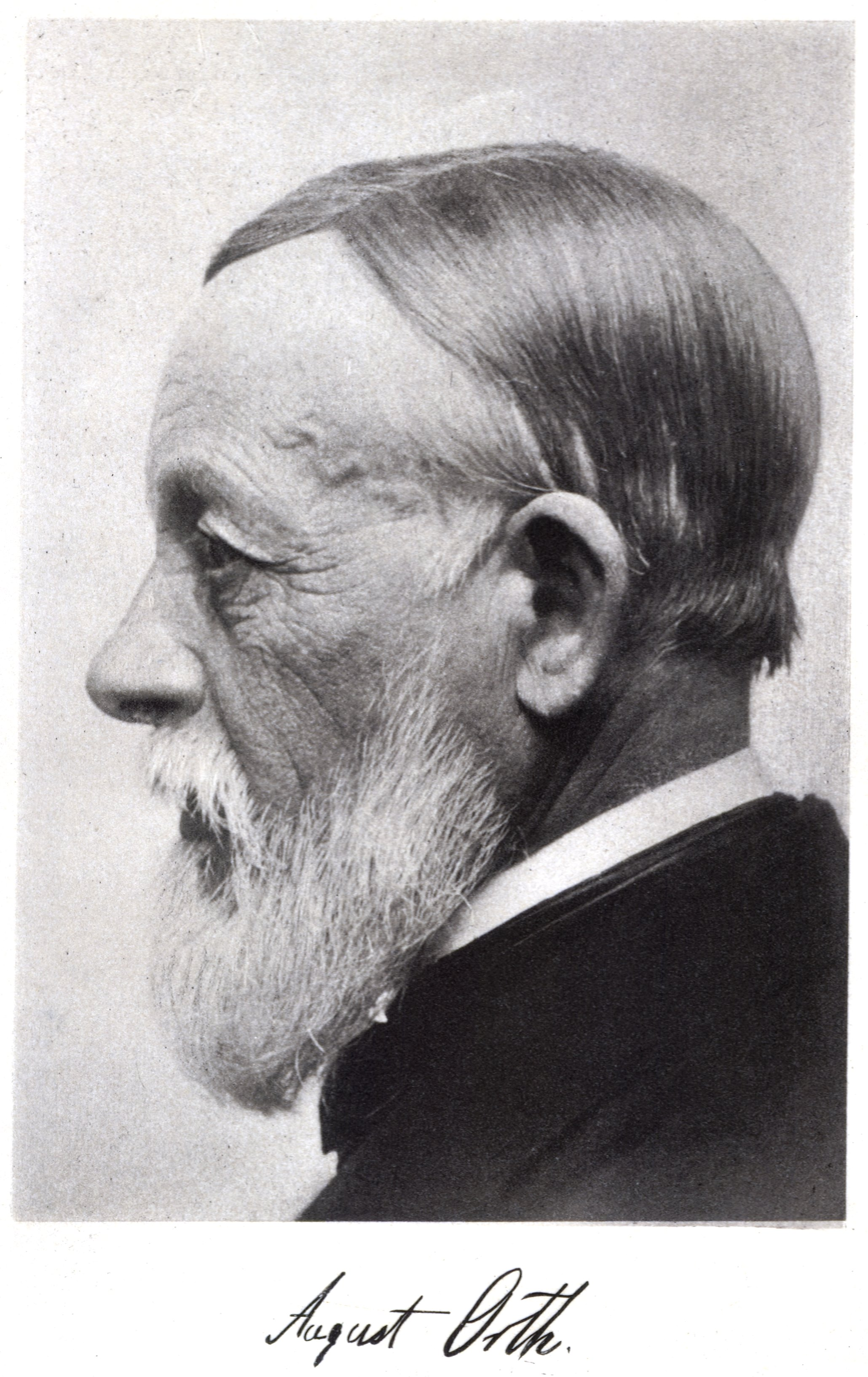
Portrait of August Orth

The Royal reception building was designed by the renowned Berlin architect, August Orth. The building, probably a gift of the railway company to Kaiser Wilhelm I, served as the starting point for his hunts in the extensive forests surrounding Halbe. The emperor used the Royal reception building, which was administered by a house yard master, on only six occasions. It was from there that he travelled by coach to the hunting lodge: Forsthaus Hammer.

August Orth was one of the most important architects in Berlin in the second half of the 19th Century. Beside numerous churches (e.g. the 1865 Zion Church in Berlin) he was particularly famous as the architect and planner for the rapidly developing railway network. He is regarded as one of the founding fathers of Berlin's metropolitan railway. From the 1860s he was the preferred architect of the railway tycoon Henry Strousberg Bethel, for which he sketched a splendid palace in 1867/68 which became known as the Palais Strousberg at 70 Wilhelmstrasse and was the British Embassy from 1877 to 1939 and in Berlin's Wedding district the large cattle and slaughterhouse from 1868. The buildings for the Berlin Gorlitz railway, which also developed from his Strousberg connection, are an outstanding example of Orth's work. The most important building was the Gorlitz railway station (1866–68) in Berlin. This station became famous but was destroyed in World War Two. The site today comprises a small cafe in the remaining building which is open in the summer and a large park. The Royal reception building in Halbe is an important example of architect August Orth's work.

== Architecture ==
The station reception building comprises a half-red building of exposed bricks, whose wall surfaces are highlighted with horizontal strips of yellowish clay bricks. It consists of the actual reception building adjacent to a single-storey shed goods directly to the north. The station reception building had a ticket hall, restaurant and official residence as well as other facilities. The simple decoration of the building is complemented by ornaments such as round windows.

== Exterior ==
The Royal reception building is a rectangular, single-storey building of exposed red bricks with four towers. The towers each enclose five arched arcades which overlook the free standing area to the east and to the railway tracks to the west. At the track side there are two entrances. From the free standing area by the entrance there was access by horse and carriage. The building is again crowned by an eagle carved out of porcelain, and coloured red. As with the station reception building, the wall surfaces consist of red clay bricks laid horizontally and broken by bands of yellow clay bricks. All joints are mortared with red mortar. The straight lines and the regularity of the brickwork are emphasised by the joint line. The upper level is surrounded by a parapet wall, which incorporates the remaining windows and wall openings.

== Interior ==
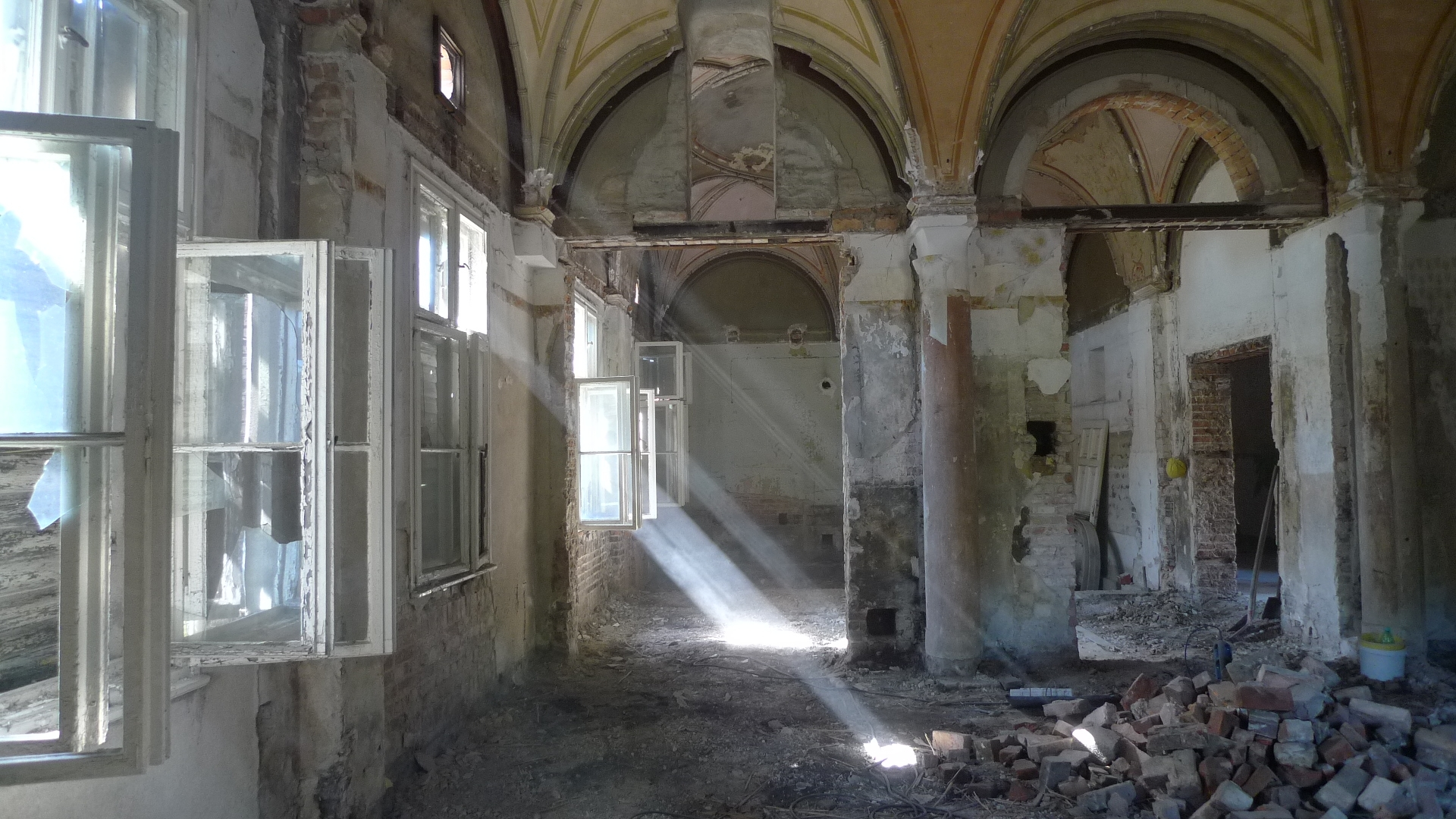
Completion of the 2010 interior demolition works

The inside of the Royal reception building comprises three principal rooms with complex, magnificent painted ceilings. In the design drawings these are called 'Vestibule', 'Waiting room for the Emperor' and 'Room for the Attendants'. Finally there was a 'toilet & closet' as well as an area for the servants. With the 1920 changes, intermediate partition walls and ceilings were inserted, with the original space remaining hidden above the false ceilings. The original ceilings with their golden painted stucco with narrow ribs, staff bundles comprising oak leaves and shells are again visible and restored now that the 1920 additions have been removed. A stone spiral staircase in the northeast tower gives access to the first floor. The interior was vastly altered in 1920 to convert the Kaiserbahnhof to civilian use, with the space being converted to 3 apartments, from 13 newly created rooms. These were removed in 2010, as the first stage in the restoration of the building.

== Halbe Station buildings ==
The ensemble of the station building, Royal reception building and cargo building in Halbe is unique in Brandenburg. The buildings are all important examples Prussian railway buildings in the second half of the 19th Century.

== Comparable royal reception buildings ==
The Royal reception building in Halbe documents the railway company's enthusiasm for assisting the emperor. The building is the earliest example of a building reserved for the emperor and his guests in Brandenburg. Comparable buildings are the later emperor stations in Zehdenick Neuhof (1888), Joachimsthal (1899) and Potsdam (1906).

== Restoration ==
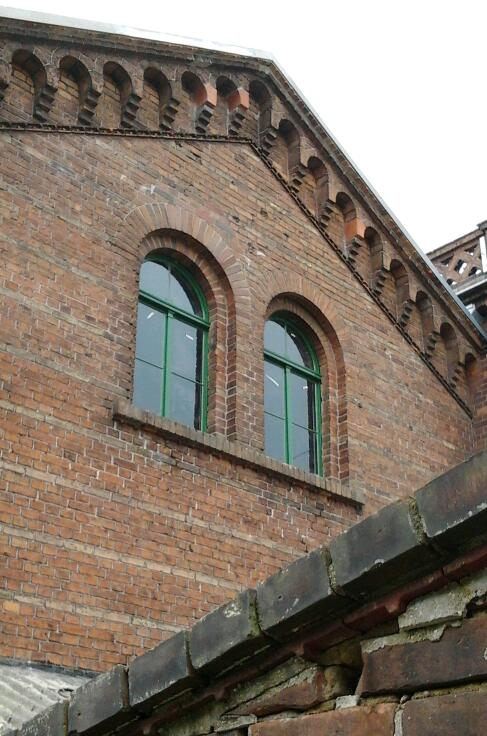
New windows, August 2011

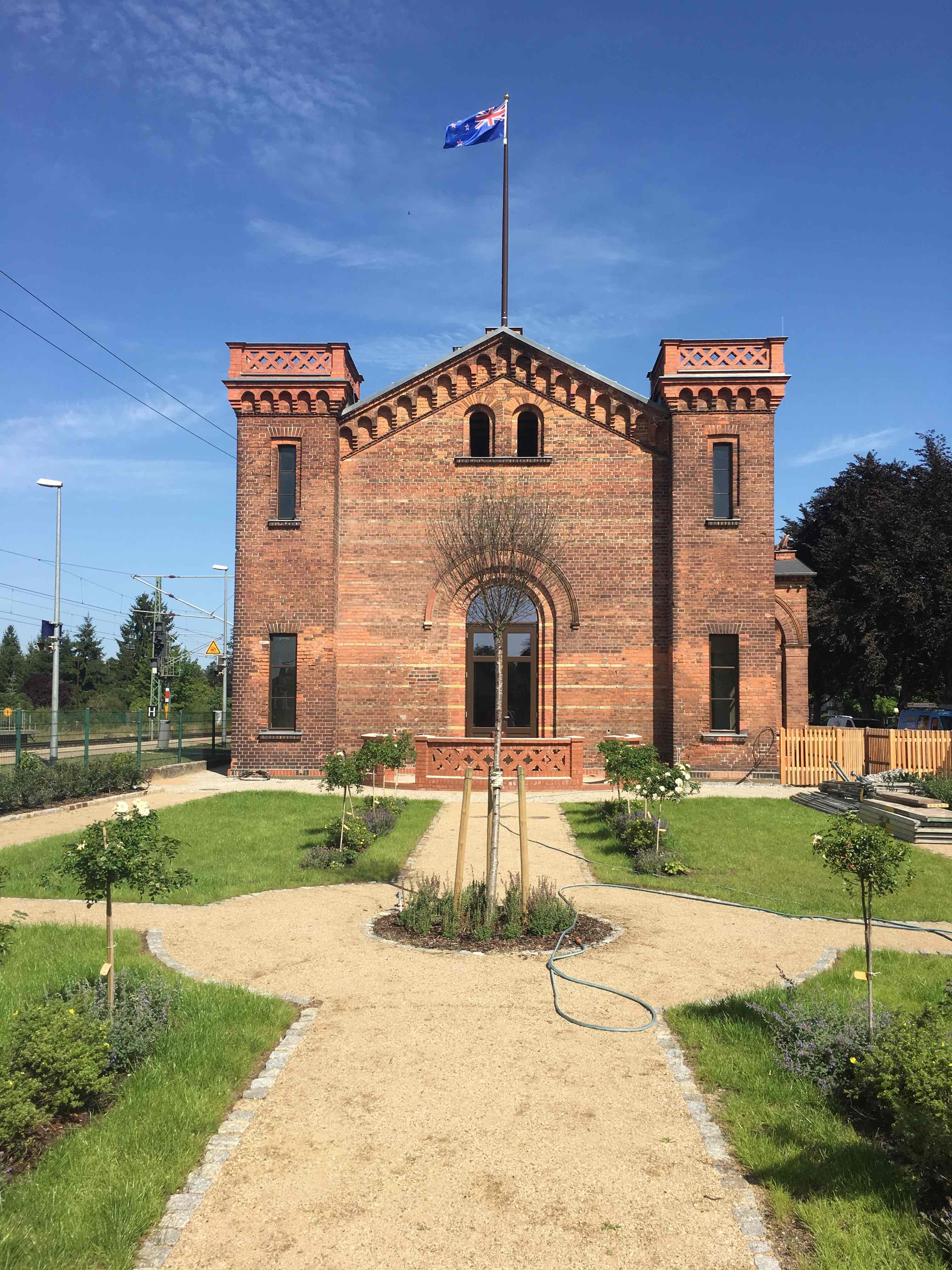
New garden, July 2019

Having falling into disrepair in the 1990s, the Kaiserbahnhof has now been restored to its 1865 state. The initial works beginning in the summer of 2010 involved removing the 1920 additions which converted the building to three apartments, making the building watertight and connecting water, gas and power, repairing and replacing the roof, repairing and cleaning the brickwork. In 2011, the windows at the first floor level were restored, the external brickwork repointed and the two decorative north towers rebuilt. The 2012 works focused on the restoration of the two south towers, repairs to the exterior brickwork, the garden and preparing for more extensive repairs to the interior, particularly on the ground floor. The restored Kaiserbahnhof is to include a small cafe and museum. The restoration was the subject of a front-page story in the Markische Allgemeine newspaper of 12 June 2010 under the title "Der neue Kaiser". and in the same newspaper on 10 August 2011 under a similar title: "Mister Macky ist der neue Kaiser". It has also been the subject of a story in The New Zealand Herald's Viva Magazine of 29 April 2011 under the title: "At Home: The Station Master". There has also been an article by expat New Zealander Andre Gifkins on 4 September 2012 in Slow Travel Berlin.

During 2013 further restoration works were undertaken—primarily incorporating a damp course barrier, laying concrete floors in the ground floor and laying drainage pipes for surface and ground water to a collection pit built in the garden to the south of the building. The ground-floor windows and doors were restored in 2015. The interior restoration of the King's Room, the Salon for the Attendants and the Vestibule commenced in May 2015 and was completed in 2016. These works had been the subject of much debate as to the methodology. Whether to do a partial restoration, adopting techniques successfully applied to Berlin's Neues Museum, to leave the interior largely "as is" or to undertake a complete restoration, so that the interiors would look much as they did when the building was completed in 1865. After much discussion the decision was made to undertake a complete restoration.

The remaining works to complete the restoration were progressed between 2016 and 2019. In addition, a new building, known as the 'Neubau' was built to the north of the Kaiserbahnhof. This new building houses the kitchen, lavatories and 'back of house' for the cafe.

A major feature of the restoration was the garden, which is now fully restored, based on the 1865 plan. Also restored, were the two flagpoles which grace the building's north and south gable. They were an important feature of August Orth's 1865 design, were removed some time ago and have now been rebuilt.

== Official reopening ==
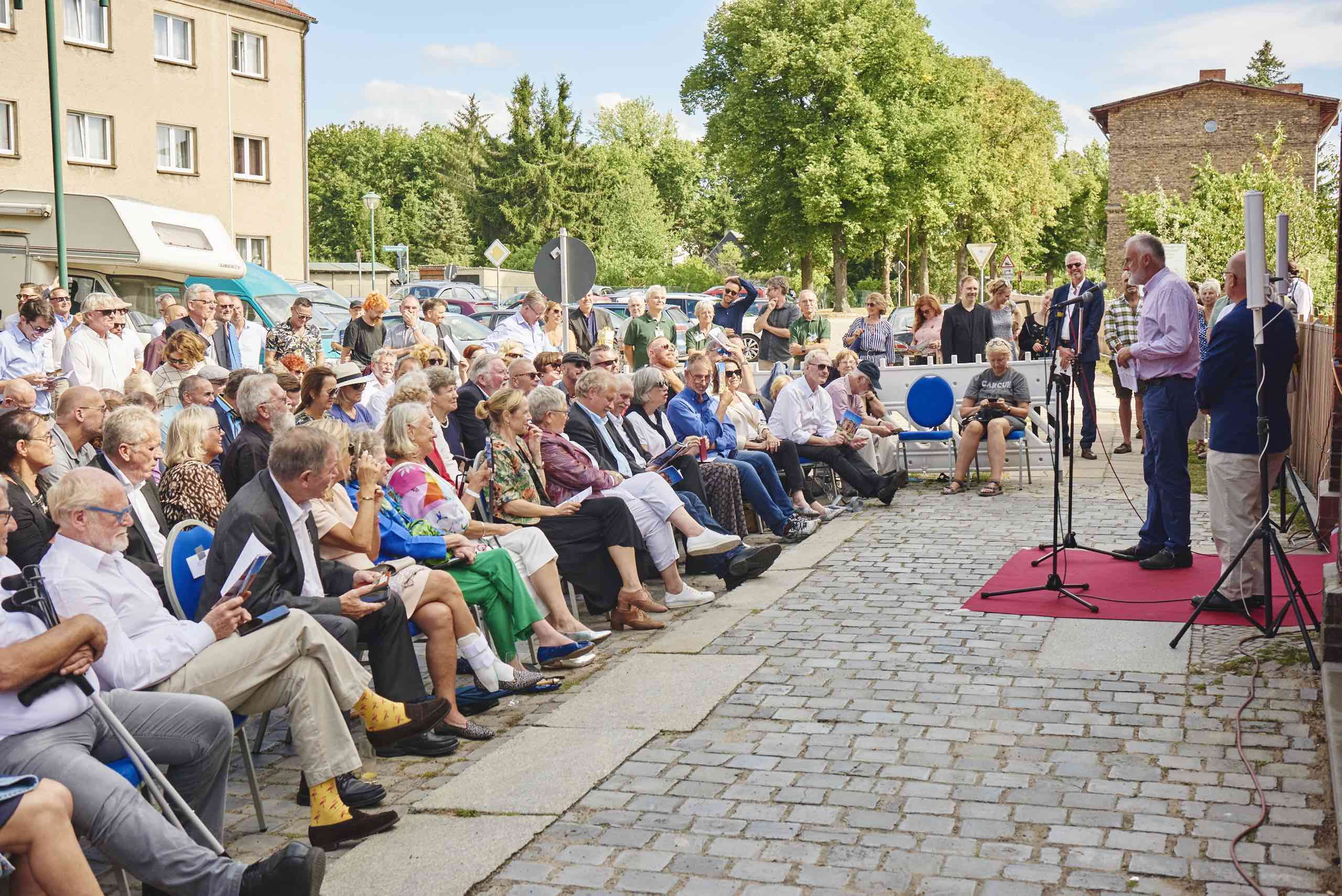
Official reopening, August 2019

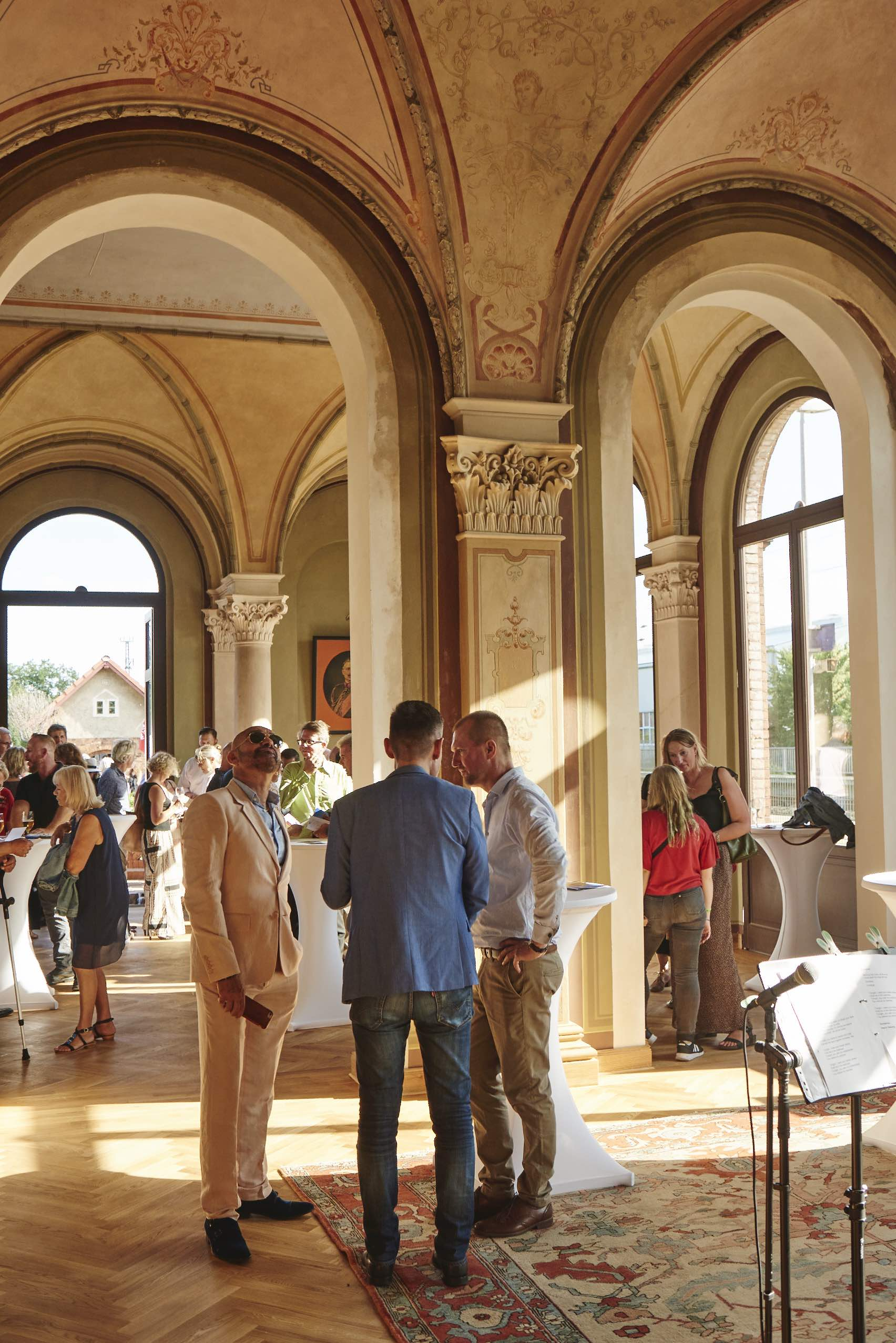
Official reopening, August 2019

The Kaiserbahnhof was officially opened on 18 August 2019. There was an article in the New Zealand press about the opening with the headline "Kiwi completes amazing restoration of Kaiser's train station near Berlin". And there was another article about the opening in the Märkische Allgemeine Zeitung with the headline "Großer Bahnhof: Kaiserbahnhof in Halbe eröffnet".
