= National Register of Historic Places listings in Forest County, Wisconsin =

Location of Forest County in Wisconsin

This is a list of the National Register of Historic Places listings in Forest County, Wisconsin. It is intended to provide a comprehensive listing of entries in the National Register of Historic Places that are located in Forest County, Wisconsin. The locations of National Register properties for which the latitude and longitude coordinates are included below may be seen in a map.

There are 11 properties and districts listed on the National Register in the county.

This National Park Service list is complete through NPS recent listings posted September 25, 2026.

== Current listings ==
	Name on the Register	Image	Date listed	Location	City or town	Description
1	Chief Willard L. and Dora Ackley House		September 24, 2026 (#100013426)	Between 3037 and 3041, State Highway 55; 45°29′05″N 88°58′32″W	Nashville	Shingled cottage where Chief Willard Ackley lived. Born in a traditional wigwam on Bishop Lake in 1889, Chief Ackley grew into a leader of the Sokaogon Ojibwe, who played a large role in the establishment of the Mole Lake reservation in 1939 for this previously landless band of Ojibwe.
2	Armstrong Creek Bridge	Armstrong Creek Bridge	November 18, 2011 (#11000841)	Old 101 Rd. over Armstrong Cr. 45°38′29″N 88°26′47″W	Armstrong Creek	Standard, Pratt pony truss bridge built of steel in 1908. This type was once common on Wisconsin roads, but only a handful remain.
3	Butternut-Franklin Lakes Archeological District	Butternut-Franklin Lakes Archeological District	May 9, 2007 (#07000429)	Along the Hidden Lakes Trail near Butternut and Franklin Lakes; 45°55′36″N 88°59′34″W	Hiles	20 sites spanning 4000 years of Native American occupation.
4	Camp Five Farmstead	Camp Five Farmstead	January 11, 1996 (#95001506)	5466 Connor Farm Rd. 45°34′18″N 88°42′08″W	Laona	1890s logging camp and the 1914 farm that supplied food for that camp. Now a living history museum.
5	Chicago and North-Western Land Office	Chicago and North-Western Land Office	December 23, 1993 (#93001446)	4556 N. Branch St. 45°26′21″N 88°39′39″W	Wabeno	1897 log building from which the Chicago and North Western Railway sold land that it had been granted for building its railroad into northeastern Wisconsin. Now Wabeno's public library.
6	Connor Lumber and Land Company Store	Connor Lumber and Land Company Store	November 25, 2019 (#100004667)	4894 Mill St. 45°33′52″N 88°40′26″W	Laona	Brick and mortar building designed by Gus Krasin for the Connor Lumber and Land Co. and built from 1914 to 1916. Housed the company store, with offices upstairs. Under restoration by the nonprofit organization Maple Place Inc. as of 2018.
7	Dinesen-Motzfeldt-Hettinger Log House	Dinesen-Motzfeldt-Hettinger Log House	January 12, 2005 (#04001486)	3125 WI 55; 45°29′06″N 88°58′31″W	Mole Lake (listed as Crandon)	1870s location of a stopping place on the Military Road north of Green Bay. The cabin was once occupied by the father of Karen Blixen who wrote Out of Africa, during his trapping and trading days. Under restoration as of 2010.
8	Franklin Lake Campground	Franklin Lake Campground	September 28, 1988 (#88001573)	National Forest Rd. 2181; 45°55′51″N 88°59′37″W	Alvin	Rustic-styled buildings built by CCCs and WPA starting in 1936.
9	Minertown-Oneva	Minertown-Oneva	May 4, 2010 (#09001315)	State Trunk Hwy. 32; 45°22′57″N 88°37′32″W	Carter	One-company lumbering town which boomed from 1899 until the mill burned in 1931. Abandoned by 1939.
10	Otter Spring House		June 3, 1999 (#99000684)	Approx. 80 meters S of Spring Pond Rd. 45°35′22″N 88°48′49″W	Lincoln	The 1933 cedar log structure was built by a CCC camp to protect the spring, which was their water supply. Water from the spring has special significance to the Potawatomi.
11	John and Anna Wywialowski Farmstead		November 7, 2016 (#16000766)	8680 WI 101; 45°41′09″N 88°26′15″W	Armstrong Creek	Farm established in 1936 in the stump-lands left by logging operations. Unlike many farms in the cutover, this one succeeded, growing from a 2-cow dairy and potato farm to a 100-cow dairy operation at its peak. Structures remain from various phases.

== See also ==
- List of National Historic Landmarks in Wisconsin
- National Register of Historic Places listings in Wisconsin
- Listings in neighboring counties: Florence, Iron (MI), Langlade, Marinette, Oconto, Oneida, Vilas
