= Wisconsin Highway 139 =

State highway in Wisconsin, United States

State Trunk Highway 139
- WIS 139 highlighted in red

Route information
- Maintained by WisDOT
- Length: 24.83 mi (39.96 km)

Major junctions
- South end: US 8 in Cavour
- WIS 70 in Tipler
- North end: M-189 near Tipler

Location
- Country: United States
- State: Wisconsin
- Counties: Forest, Florence

Highway system
- Wisconsin State Trunk Highway System; Interstate; US; State; Scenic; Rustic
| ← WIS 138 | → WIS 140 |

State Trunk Highway 139 (often called Highway 139, STH-139 or WIS 139) is a state highway in the US state of Wisconsin. It runs north–south in north central Wisconsin from a junction with US Highway 8 (US 8) near Cavour in central Forest County to the Michigan state line and its connection with M-189 at the Brule River to approximately four miles north of Tipler in Florence County. Along its route, WIS 139 serves as the main access route to Long Lake and serves parts of the Nicolet side of the Chequamegon-Nicolet National Forest.

== Route description ==
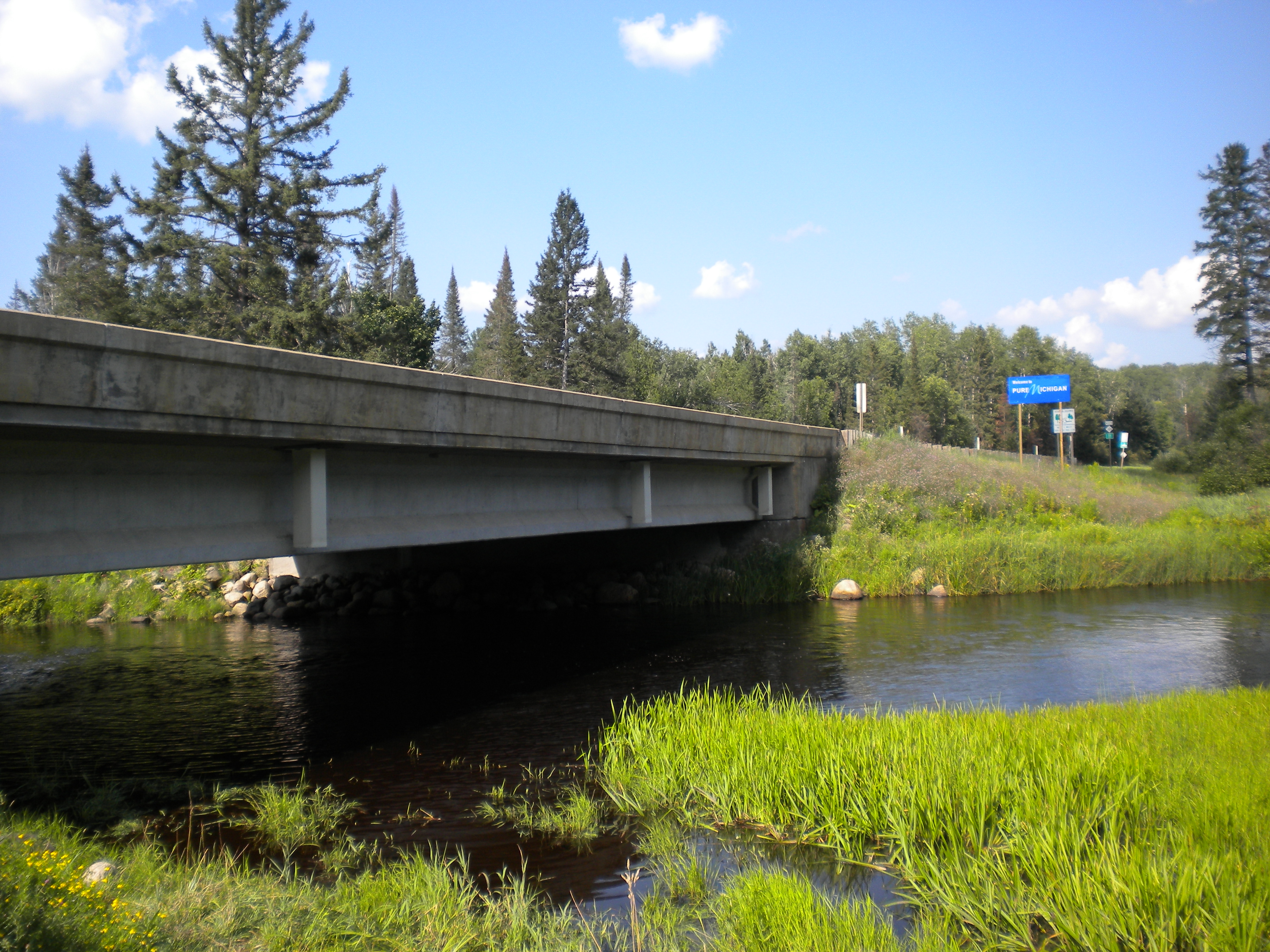
Northern terminus over the Brule River crossing as WIS 139 transitions to M-189

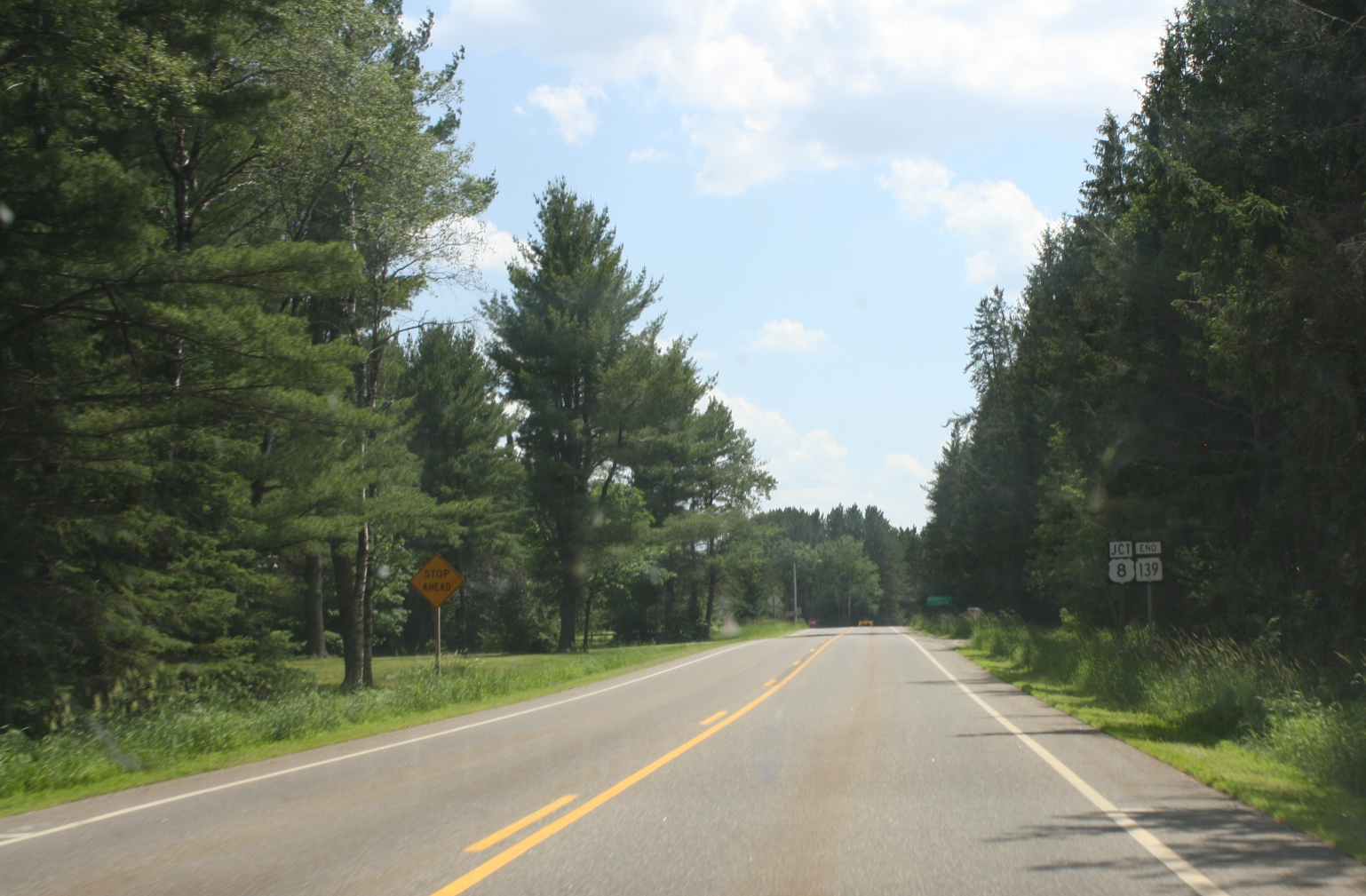
Southern terminus

Starting at US 8 near Cavour, WIS 139 traverses northward through multiple forests. It passes through Newald, Popple River, and Long Lake before reaching WIS 70. At this point, both WIS 139 and WIS 70 run concurrently with each other for under three miles (4.8 km). After leaving the concurrency, WIS 139 travels northward for more than a mile (1.6 km) before crossing the Michigan state line above the Brule River. At this point, the route transitions into M-189.

== Major intersections ==
| County | Location | mi | km | Destinations | Notes |
|---|---|---|---|---|---|
| Forest | Caswell | 0.0 | 0.0 | US 8 – Laona, Armstrong Creek | |
| Forest | Caswell | 1.8 | 2.9 | CTH-O west | |
| Florence | Tipler | 20.6 | 33.2 | WIS 70 east – Florence | Southern end of WIS 70 concurrency |
| Florence | Tipler | 23.4 | 37.7 | WIS 70 west – Eagle River | Northern end of WIS 70 concurrency |
| Brule River | | 24.8 | 39.9 | M-189 north – Iron River | Continuation into Michigan state line |
1.000 mi = 1.609 km; 1.000 km = 0.621 mi: Concurrency terminus
