= Bonneval =

Bonneval may refer to:

== Places ==
France

- Bonneval, Eure-et-Loir
- Bonneval, Haute-Loire
- Bonneval, Savoie
- Bonneval-sur-Arc, Savoie

United States

- Bonneval, Wisconsin

== Other uses ==
- Bonneval (horse), a New Zealand racehorse
- Bonneval (surname)
- Bonneval Abbey (Aveyron)
- Bonneval Abbey (Eure-et-Loir)
