= Hiles, Wisconsin =

Hiles is the name of some places in the U.S. state of Wisconsin:

- Hiles, Forest County, Wisconsin, a town
- Hiles (community), Wisconsin, an unincorporated community in Forest County
- Hiles, Wood County, Wisconsin, a town
