= Mole Lake =

Mole Lake may refer to:

- Mole Lake (McEwing Township, Algoma District), a lake in Algoma District, Ontario
- Mole Lake (Nipissing District), a lake in Nipissing District, Ontario
- Mole Lake (Galbraith Township, Algoma District), a lake in Algoma District, Ontario
- Mole Lake, Wisconsin, an unincorporated community
- Mole Lake Band of Lake Superior Chippewa, an alternative name for the Sokaogon Chippewa Community
- Mole Lake Indian Reservation
- Battle of Mole Lake (1806), between Sioux and Chippewa warriors
