= Brule Lake (Michigan-Wisconsin) =

Lake in the state of Michigan, United States

- Location within Michigan Location within the United States
- Location: Iron County, Michigan, and Forest County, Wisconsin, United States
- Coordinates: 46°03′22″N 88°50′20″W
- Type: Lake
- Primary outflows: Brule River
- Basin countries: United States
- Max. length: 2 mi (3.2 km)
- Surface area: 250 acres (1.0 km^{2})
- Surface elevation: 1,552 ft (473 m)

Brule Lake (/ˈbruːliː/ BROO-lee) forms part of the border between the states of Michigan and Wisconsin and is the headwater of the Brule River at 46°02′23″N 88°50′59″W.

The source of the name is the Ojibwa name for the river, Wisakota, meaning burned or burnt, which the French Voyageurs translated as Brûlée.

== See also ==
- List of lakes in Michigan
