= Popple River =

Popple River may refer to several places:

- Popple River (Pine River), in northeastern Wisconsin
- Popple River (Black River), in central Wisconsin
- Popple River (Minnesota)
- Popple River, Wisconsin, a town
- Popple River (community), Wisconsin, an unincorporated community
