= Carter, Wisconsin =

Carter may refer to the following communities in Wisconsin:

- Carter, Forest County, Wisconsin, an unincorporated community
- Carter, Iron County, Wisconsin, an unincorporated community
