= Bagdad, Wisconsin =

- Ghost Town
- Location within Wisconsin
- Coordinates: 45°39′22″N 88°42′13″W
- Country: United States
- State: Wisconsin
- County: Forest
- Elevation: 1,535 ft (468 m)
- Time zone: UTC-6 (Central (CST))
  - Summer (DST): UTC-5 (CDT)
- Area codes: 715 & 534

Bagdad was a settlement and railroad stop located in northern Forest County, Wisconsin, United States.

Bagdad was situated southeast of Newald and west of Laona Junction, in what is now the town of Caswell. Bagdad was located on the Minneapolis, St. Paul, and Sault Ste. Marie Railroad and was mentioned in a court case between the railroad and the Railroad Commission of Wisconsin in 1914.
