= MacArthur Pine =

The MacArthur Pine was an Eastern White Pine, located in the Chequamegon–Nicolet National Forest, near Newald, Wisconsin. It was the eastern white pine national champion, 1948–1971. It was named by a Milwaukee newspaper in 1945 in honor of General Douglas MacArthur.

The circumference at the base (CBH) was 17 feet 8 inches (5.38 m). Its height was 148 feet (45 m) and it weighed 27 tons. Some 35 feet (11 m) of the trunk was hollow. In 1977, 40 feet (12 m) of its top blown was out. It was struck by lightning in 1986 and felled by a suspicious fire on June 23, 2001.
