= Spring House =

Spring House or Spring house may refer to:

- Spring house (or springhouse), a small building used for refrigeration found in rural areas
- Spring House, Pennsylvania, a census-designated place in Montgomery County, Pennsylvania
- Spring House (Barryville, New York), a historic inn in Sullivan County, New York
- Spring House (Pittsford, New York), a historic inn in Monroe County, New York
- Springhouse, an American medical publishing company acquired by Lippincott Williams & Wilkins

== See also ==
- Spring House Gazebo, a historic gazebo of Eden Park in Cincinnati, Ohio
- Otter Spring House, a historic spring house in the Town of Lincoln in Forest County, Wisconsin
