= Neil McEachin =

American lawyer, judge, and politician

Neil McEachin (January 28, 1900 – November 8, 1957) was an American lawyer, judge, and politician.

Born in Cavour, Forest County, Wisconsin, McEachin served in the United States Army briefly during World War I. He went to Marquette University from 1918 to 1921 and to Valparaiso University from 1921 to 1922. He was admitted to the Wisconsin bar and practiced law in Rhinelander, Wisconsin. He served as a municipal court judge until the Wisconsin Legislature abolished the court and created the Oneida County, Wisconsin court. In 1933, McEachin served in the Wisconsin State Assembly and was a Democrat. McEachin then worked for the United States Government in the Philippines. McEachin died in Los Angeles, California.
