= Caswell, Wisconsin =

- Town
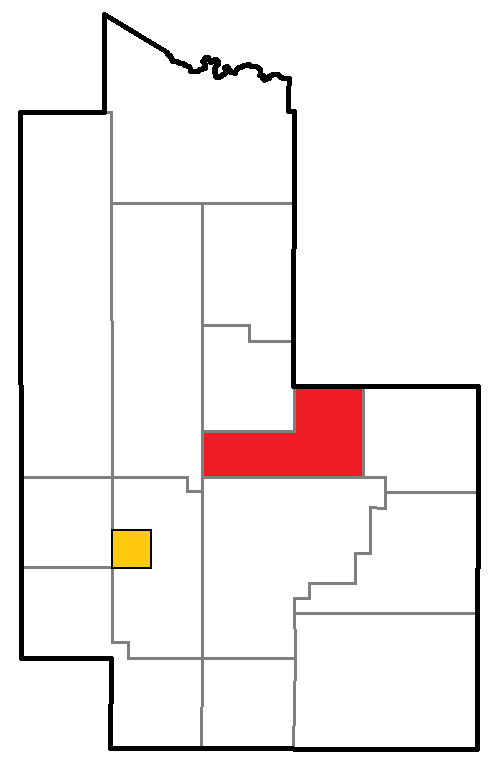
- Location of Caswell, within Forest County

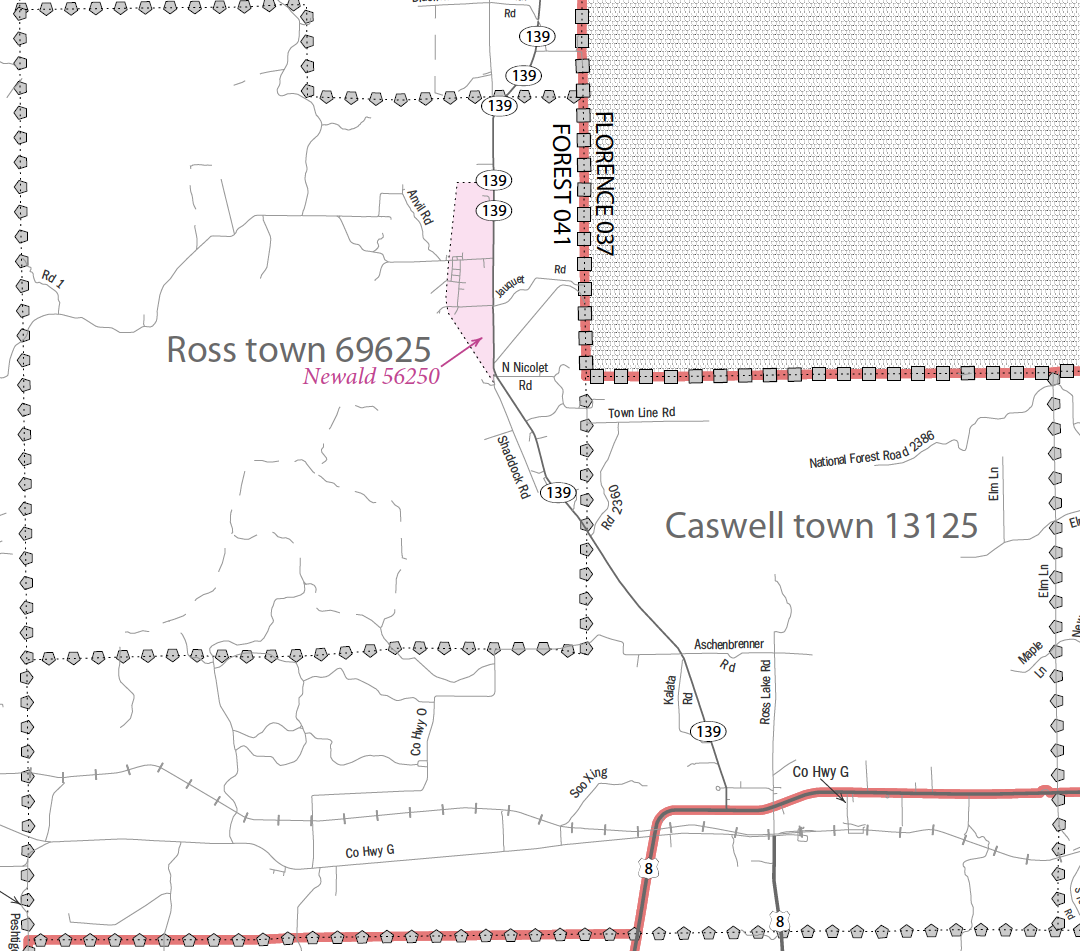
- The Towns of Ross and Caswell
- Coordinates: 45°39′23″N 88°40′33″W
- Country: United States
- State: Wisconsin
- County: Forest
- Established: 1901

Area
  - Total: 47.9 sq mi (124.1 km^{2})
  - Land: 47.7 sq mi (123.6 km^{2})
  - Water: 0.15 sq mi (0.4 km^{2})
- Elevation: 1,496 ft (456 m)

Population (2020)
  - Total: 72
  - Density: 1.5/sq mi (0.58/km^{2})
- Time zone: UTC-6 (Central (CST))
  - Summer (DST): UTC-5 (CDT)
- Area codes: 715 & 534
- FIPS code: 55-13125
- GNIS feature ID: 1582930
- Website: https://townofcaswellwi.com/

Caswell is a town in Forest County, Wisconsin, United States. The population was 72 at the 2020 census. The unincorporated communities of Cavour and Laona Junction are located within the town. The ghost town of Bagdad was located in the town.

== History ==
The Town of Caswell was created from land in the Town of Cavour by an act of the Wisconsin Legislature in 1901. The remainder of the Town of Cavour, which ceased to exist at that point, went to create the Town of Wabeno. The town was probably named after Lucien B. Caswell, who served in the Wisconsin Assembly as well as eight terms in the U.S. House of Representatives.

== Geography ==
According to the United States Census Bureau, the town has a total area of 47.9 square miles (124 km^{2}), of which 47.7 square miles (124 km^{2}) is land and 0.2 square miles (0.52 km^{2}), or 0.35%, is water. The Peshtigo River runs through the town. U.S. Route 8, Wisconsin Highway 139, and Forest County Roads G and O are the highway routes that run through the town.

== Demographics ==
Historical population
Census	Pop.	Note	%±
1910	216		—
1920	798		269.4%
1930	244		−69.4%
1940	199		−18.4%
1950	133		−33.2%
1960	107		−19.5%
1970	96		−10.3%
1980	85		−11.5%
1990	94		10.6%
2000	102		8.5%
2010	91		−10.8%
2020	72		−20.9%
U.S. Decennial Census; 1910, 1920 1930, 1940, 1950; 1960, 1970, 1980 1980, 1990, 2000; 2000, 2010

As of the census of 2000, there were 102 people, 41 households, and 28 families residing in the town. The population density was 2.1 people per square mile (0.8/km^{2}). There were 156 housing units at an average density of 3.3 per square mile (1.3/km^{2}). The racial makeup of the town was 89.22% White, 2.94% African American, 2.94% Native American, 2.94% from other races, and 1.96% from two or more races. Hispanic or Latino of any race were 3.92% of the population.

There were 41 households, out of which 31.7% had children under the age of 18 living with them, 56.1% were married couples living together, 7.3% had a female householder with no husband present, and 31.7% were non-families. 29.3% of all households were made up of individuals, and 14.6% had someone living alone who was 65 years of age or older. The average household size was 2.49 and the average family size was 2.96.

In the town, the population was spread out, with 29.4% under the age of 18, 2.0% from 18 to 24, 33.3% from 25 to 44, 19.6% from 45 to 64, and 15.7% who were 65 years of age or older. The median age was 40 years. For every 100 females, there were 108.2 males. For every 100 females age 18 and over, there were 111.8 males.

The median income for a household in the town was $37,750, and the median income for a family was $39,375. Males had a median income of $30,417 versus $20,417 for females. The per capita income for the town was $15,560. There were 21.2% of families and 22.5% of the population living below the poverty line, including 34.8% of under eighteens and 20.0% of those over 64.
