= Keith, Wisconsin =

- Ghost town
- Location within Wisconsin
- Coordinates: 45°30′30″N 88°52′58″W
- Country: United States
- State: Wisconsin
- County: Forest
- Town: Lincoln
- Elevation: 1,591 ft (485 m)
- GNIS feature ID: 1845335

Keith is a ghost town in Forest County, Wisconsin, United States. Keith was located in the town of Lincoln, 4.5 miles (7.2 km) south-southeast of Crandon. The town was marked on USGS maps as late as 1939.
