= Atkins, Wisconsin =

- Unincorporated community
- Location within Wisconsin Location within the United States
- Coordinates: 45°39′55″N 89°01′23″W
- Country: United States
- State: Wisconsin
- County: Forest
- Elevation: 1,667 ft (508 m)
- Time zone: UTC-6 (Central (CST))
  - Summer (DST): UTC-5 (CDT)
- Area codes: 715 & 534
- GNIS feature ID: 1578675

Atkins is an unincorporated community in the town of Hiles, Forest County, Wisconsin, United States. Atkins is located on the Canadian National Railway, 8.5 miles (13.7 km) northwest of Crandon. The community was likely named for Hubbard C. Atkins, the superintendent of the Prairie du Chien & La Crosse railroad in the 1880s.
