= Jerome T. Schwartz =

American politician

Jerome T. Schwartz (born October 5, 1951) is a former American politician, a logger and businessman.

Born in Chicago, Illinois, Schwartz graduated from Goodman-Armstrong Creek High School in Goodman, Wisconsin. He is a logger and insurance consultant. Schwartz served as chairman of the Armstrong Creek Town Board. In 1991, Schwartz served in the Wisconsin State Assembly and was known as the "Lumberjack Legislator." Schwartz was a Democrat.
