= Ross, Wisconsin =

- Town
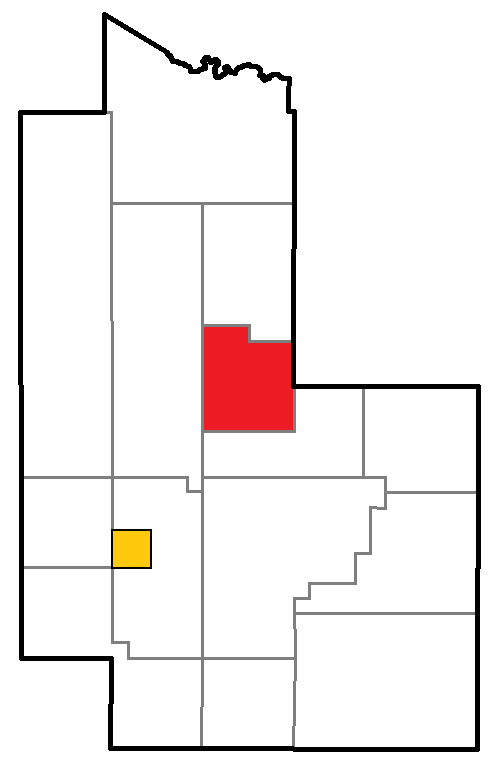
- Location of Ross, within Forest County

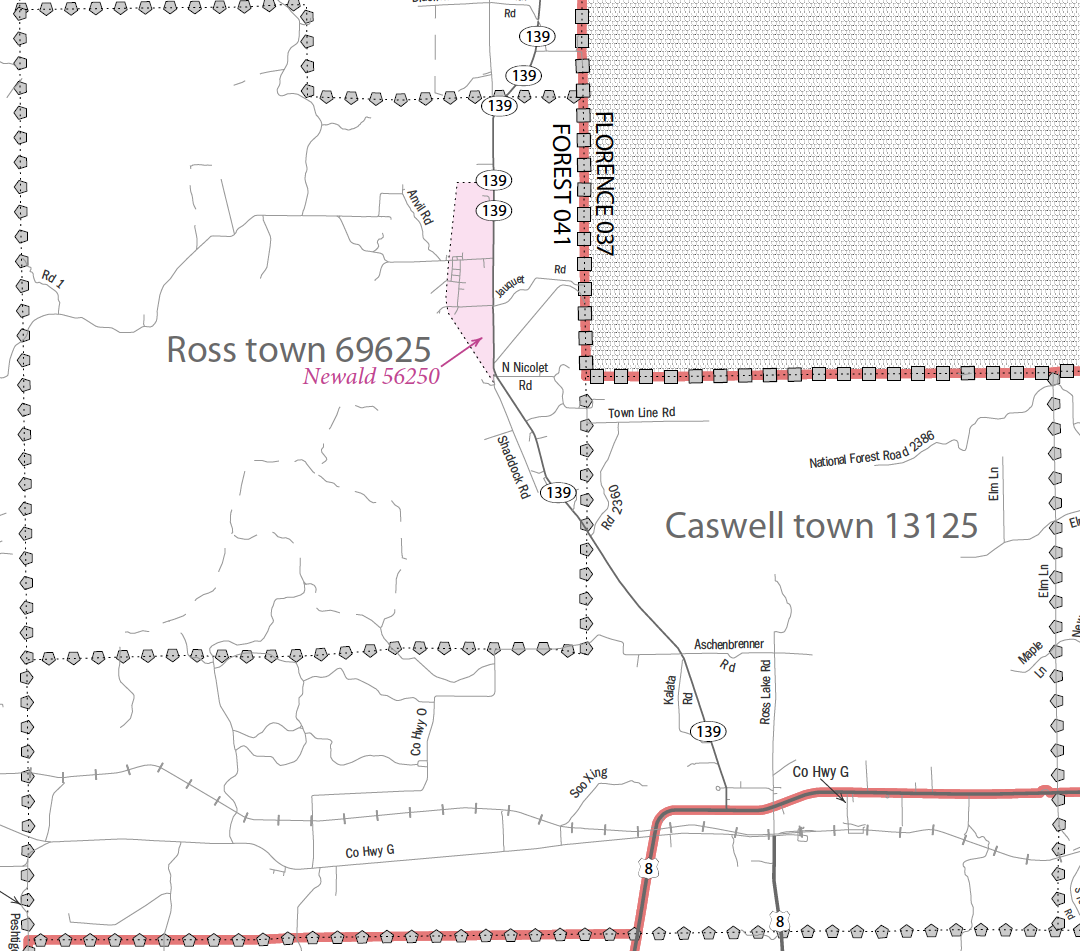
- The Towns of Ross and Caswell, Wisconsin
- Coordinates: 45°44′37″N 88°42′51″W
- Country: United States
- State: Wisconsin
- County: Forest

Area
  - Total: 38.6 sq mi (100.0 km^{2})
  - Land: 38.5 sq mi (99.7 km^{2})
  - Water: 0.12 sq mi (0.3 km^{2})
- Elevation: 1,558 ft (475 m)

Population (2020)
  - Total: 132
  - Density: 3.43/sq mi (1.32/km^{2})
- Time zone: UTC-6 (Central (CST))
  - Summer (DST): UTC-5 (CDT)
- Area codes: 715 & 534
- FIPS code: 55-69625
- GNIS feature ID: 1584067
- Website: https://townofrosswi.com/

Ross is a town in Forest County, Wisconsin, United States. The population was 132 at the 2020 census. The census-designated place of Newald is located in the town.

== Geography ==
According to the United States Census Bureau, the town has a total area of 38.6 square miles (100 km^{2}), of which 38.5 square miles (100 km^{2}) is land and 0.1 square miles (0.26 km^{2}), or 0.26%, is water.

== Demographics ==
Historical population
Census	Pop.	Note	%±
2000	167		—
2010	136		−18.6%
2020	132		−2.9%
U.S. Decennial Census

As of the census of 2000, there were 167 people, 75 households, and 54 families residing in the town. The population density was 4.3 people per square mile (1.7/km^{2}). There were 218 housing units at an average density of 5.7 per square mile (2.2/km^{2}). The racial makeup of the town was 100.00% White.

There were 75 households, out of which 16.0% had children under the age of 18 living with them, 65.3% were married couples living together, 1.3% had a female householder with no husband present, and 26.7% were non-families. 25.3% of all households were made up of individuals, and 14.7% had someone living alone who was 65 years of age or older. The average household size was 2.23 and the average family size was 2.60.

In the town, the population was spread out, with 12.6% under the age of 18, 10.2% from 18 to 24, 13.8% from 25 to 44, 30.5% from 45 to 64, and 32.9% who were 65 years of age or older. The median age was 53 years. For every 100 females, there were 125.7 males. For every 100 females age 18 and over, there were 128.1 males.

The median income for a household in the town was $28,750, and the median income for a family was $38,125. Males had a median income of $24,375 versus $18,000 for females. The per capita income for the town was $17,361. About 2.9% of families and 6.3% of the population were below the poverty line, including 25.9% of those under the age of eighteen and none of those 65 or over.
