= Brule River =

River in the U.S. states of Michigan and Wisconsin

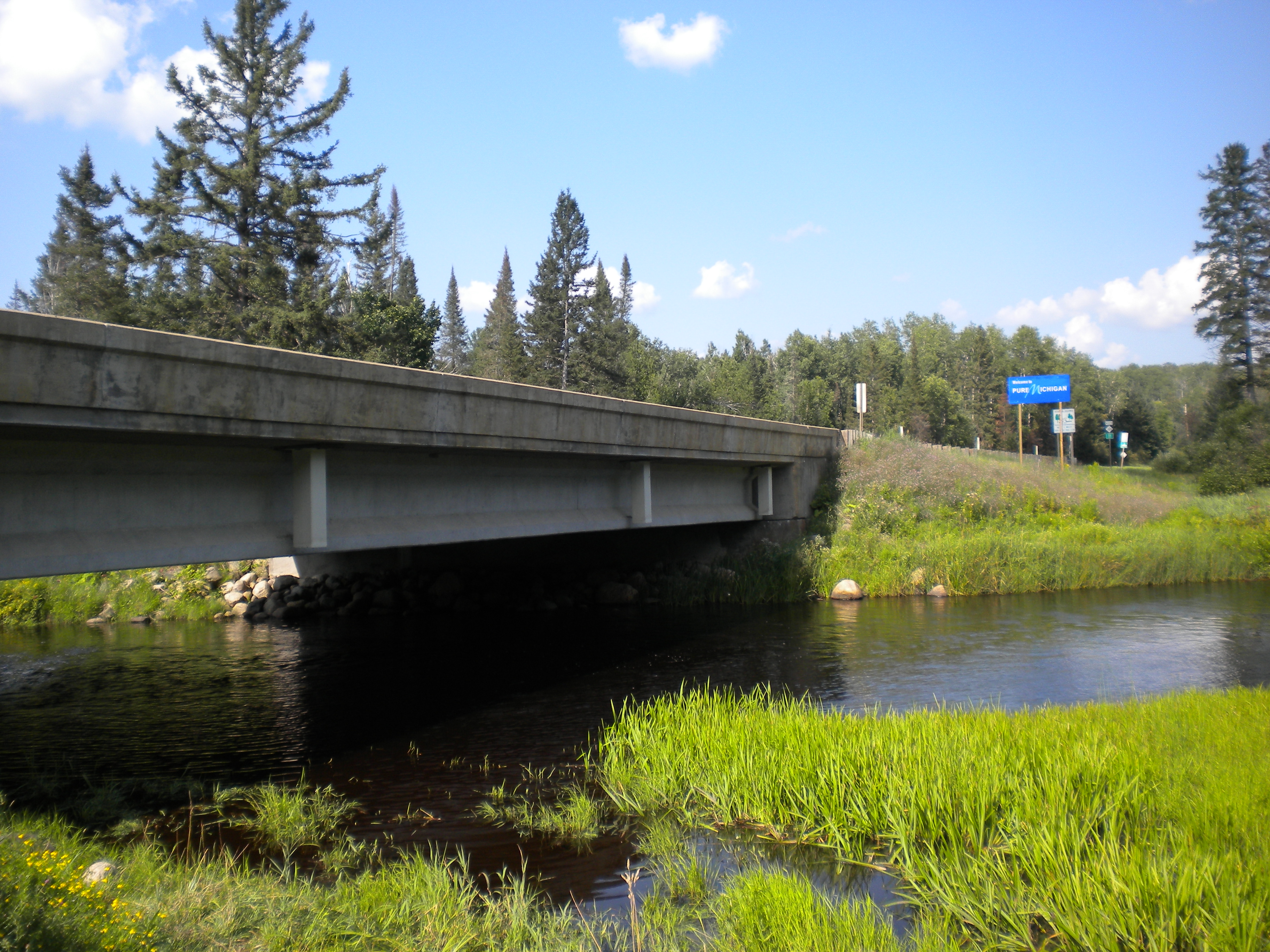
Brule River at the M-189–WIS 139 crossing

The Brule River (/ˈbruːliː/ BROO-lee) is a 52.3-mile-long (84.2 km) river in the U.S. states of Michigan and Wisconsin. Nearly, almost all of the course forms a portion of the border between the two states.

The Brule begins at Brule Lake, just inside the Michigan border, at 46°02′23″N 88°50′59″W. It winds east and southeast until joining with the Michigamme River at 45°57′12″N 88°11′46″W to form the Menominee River and on into Lake Michigan.

The Brule River is stocked with many types of trout. These include Brook, and Brown trout

The Brule is popular for canoeing, spanning about 45 miles (72 km) with several stop/start points somewhat evenly spread out. The Brule's flow is much more reliable compared to several other surrounding rivers, due to its "untouched" quality. There is only one dam on the river that affects the water level, but that is located on Brule Island near the end of the Brule just below the Paint River.

Much of the land on both sides of the river is publicly owned with several good campsites available. Fishing is exceptional, with brook and brown trout in the upper areas and tributaries. Smallmouth bass and northern pike can be found in abundance in the lower sections.
