= Blackwell, Wisconsin =

- Town
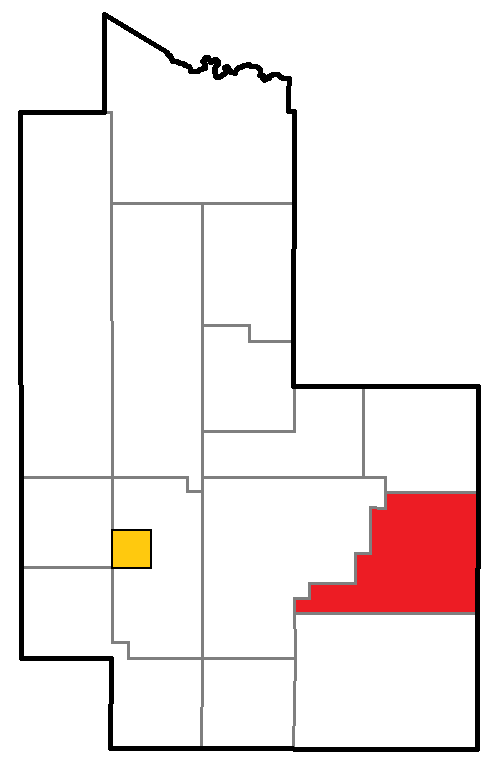
- Location of Blackwell, within Forest County
- Coordinates: 45°32′7″N 88°32′56″W
- Country: United States
- State: Wisconsin
- County: Forest

Area
  - Total: 66.4 sq mi (171.9 km^{2})
  - Land: 66.0 sq mi (170.9 km^{2})
  - Water: 0.39 sq mi (1.0 km^{2})
- Elevation: 1,421 ft (433 m)

Population (2020)
  - Total: 152
  - Density: 2.30/sq mi (0.889/km^{2})
- Time zone: UTC-6 (Central (CST))
  - Summer (DST): UTC-5 (CDT)
- Area codes: 715 & 534
- FIPS code: 55-07950
- GNIS feature ID: 1582823

Blackwell is a town in Forest County, Wisconsin, United States. The population was 152 at the time of the 2020 census. The unincorporated community of Blackwell is located in the town. The unincorporated community of Blackwell Junction is also located partially in the town. The town was named for sawmill owner John Blackwell.

== Geography ==
According to the United States Census Bureau, the town has a total area of 66.4 square miles (172 km^{2}), of which 66.0 square miles (171 km^{2}) is land and 0.4 square miles (1.0 km^{2}), or 0.56%, is water.

== Demographics ==
As of the census of 2000, there were 347 people, 45 households, and 31 families residing in the town. The population density was 5.3 people per square mile (2.0/km^{2}). There were 116 housing units at an average density of 1.8 per square mile (0.7/km^{2}). The racial makeup of the town was 68.01% White, 1.44% African American, 27.67% Native American, 0.86% Asian, 1.44% from other races, and 0.58% from two or more races. Hispanic or Latino of any race were 2.31% of the population.

There were 45 households, out of which 26.7% had children under the age of 18 living with them, 57.8% were married couples living together, 6.7% had a female householder with no husband present, and 28.9% were non-families. 28.9% of all households were made up of individuals, and 6.7% had someone living alone who was 65 years of age or older. The average household size was 2.38 and the average family size was 2.94.

In the town, the population was spread out, with 20.5% under the age of 18, 40.1% from 18 to 24, 8.1% from 25 to 44, 11.2% from 45 to 64, and 20.2% who were 65 years of age or older. The median age was 21 years. For every 100 females, there were 186.8 males. For every 100 females age 18 and over, there were 170.6 males.

The median income for a household in the town was $28,750, and the median income for a family was $42,679. Males had a median income of $27,321 versus $6,630 for females. The per capita income for the town was $9,089. About 13.8% of families and 62.9% of the population were below the poverty line, including 16.2% of those under age 18 and 40.0% of those age 65 or over.
