= John and Anna Wywialowski Farmstead =

- U.S. National Register of Historic Places
- Location: 8680 WI 101; Armstrong Creek, Wisconsin
- Built: 1918–1946
- Architectural style: Late 19th and Early 20th Century American Movements
- NRHP reference No.: 16000766
- Added to NRHP: November 7, 2016

The John and Anna Wywialowski Farmstead is located in Armstrong Creek, Wisconsin.

== History ==
John Wywialowski and his wife Anna purchased the farm in 1936. They used to expand their dairy and potato farm, as they had already owned the adjacent property. It was added to the State and the National Register of Historic Places in 2016.
