= Otter Spring House =

- U.S. National Register of Historic Places
- Location within Wisconsin Location within the United States
- Nearest city: Lincoln, Wisconsin
- Coordinates: 45°35′22″N 88°48′49″W
- Area: 9.8 acres (4.0 ha)
- Built: 1933
- Built by: Civilian Conservation Corps Company 649
- Architectural style: Rustic
- NRHP reference No.: 99000684
- Added to NRHP: June 3, 1999

The Otter Spring House is a historic spring house in the Town of Lincoln in Forest County, Wisconsin. The spring house was built on Otter Spring in 1933 as a Civilian Conservation Corps project. It was originally built to supply water to the CCC's Waubikon Lake Camp but was insufficient for that purpose. Since its construction, the Potawatomi have used the spring house for ceremonial and religious purposes. Potawatomi ritual feasts must use spring water, as springs are considered "living waters"; when taking water from the spring, the Potawatomi offer a thanksgiving prayer and a tobacco offering. The spring house was added to the National Register of Historic Places on June 3, 1999.
