= Bonneval (surname) =

Bonneval is a surname. Notable people with the surname include:

- Éric Bonneval (born 1963), French rugby union player
- Hugo Bonneval (born 1990), French rugby union player, son of Éric

== See also ==
- Claude Alexandre de Bonneval (1675–1747), French army officer
