= Minertown-Oneva =

- U.S. National Register of Historic Places
- U.S. Historic district
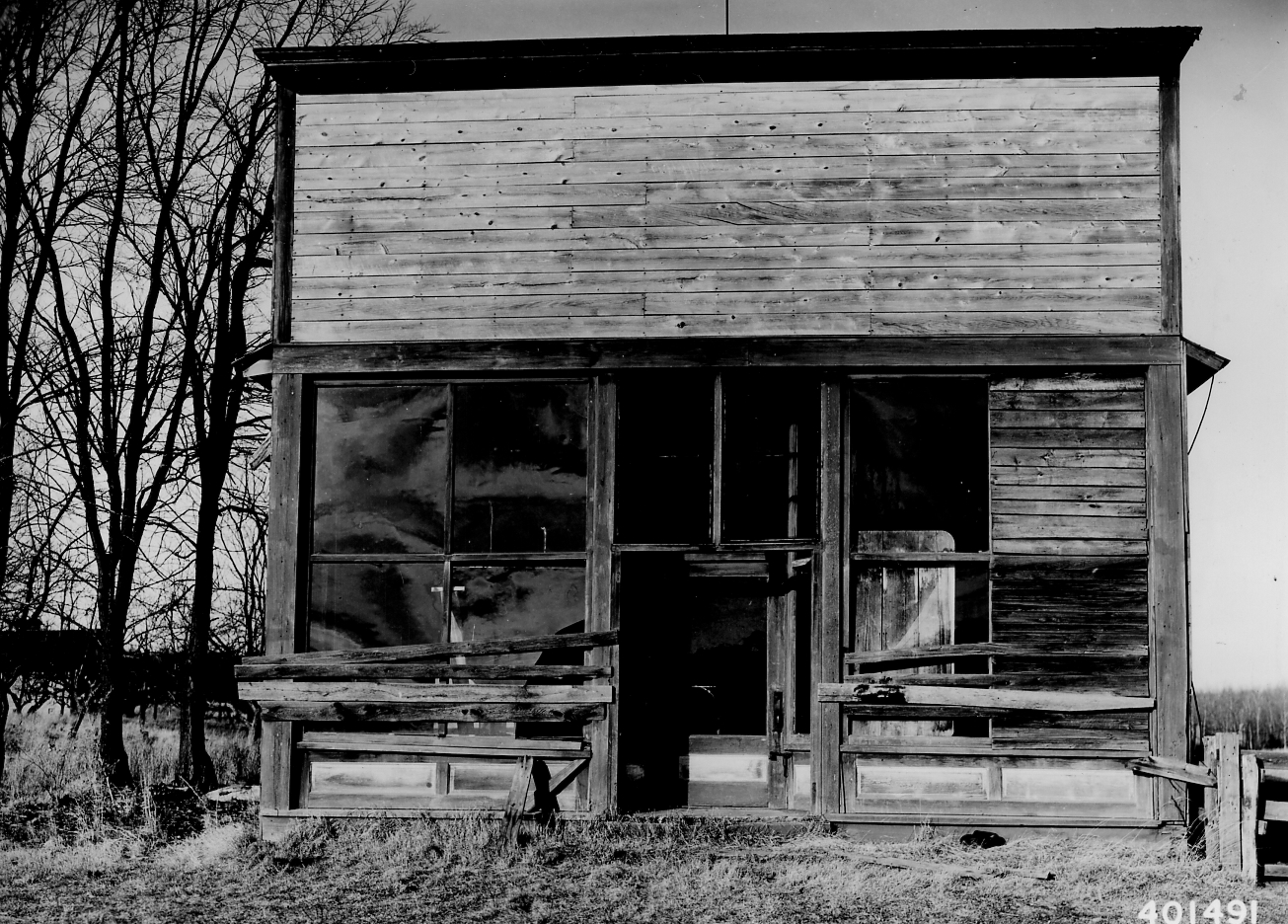
- Abandoned general store in 1939

- Location within Wisconsin
- Location: State Trunk Hwy. 32, vicinity of Carter, Wisconsin
- Coordinates: 45°22′56.62″N 88°37′32.02″W
- Area: 43.5 acres (17.6 ha)
- NRHP reference No.: 09001315
- Added to NRHP: May 4, 2010

Minertown-Oneva, also known as Minertown, in Forest County, Wisconsin is a historic logging camp built in the early 1900s by Wilbur and Henry T. Miner. It's in the vicinity of Carter, Wisconsin.

According to the National Park Service:

In 1899, brothers Wilbur and Henry T. Miner from Vernon County, WI, purchased a 4,000 acre tract in Forest County, Wisconsin, where they constructed a sawmill and related settlement known as Minertown. The settlement included a boarding house and company store for those employed by the Miner Lumber Company, as well as a planing mill, roundhouse, depot, store, a blacksmith shop, a cook shanty, several small four-room houses, and a barn. In 1931, the mill was destroyed by fire and the remaining community was subsequently abandoned. Today, the Minertown-Oneva site is significant for its potential to provide information relevant to late nineteenth century settlement of Forest County, as well as the history of Wisconsin's hardwood logging era.

The site was listed on the U.S. National Register of Historic Places on May 4, 2010. The listing was announced as the featured listing in the National Park Service's weekly list of May 28, 2010.
