= Dinesen-Motzfeldt-Hettinger Log House =

Historic house in Wisconsin, United States

- U.S. National Register of Historic Places
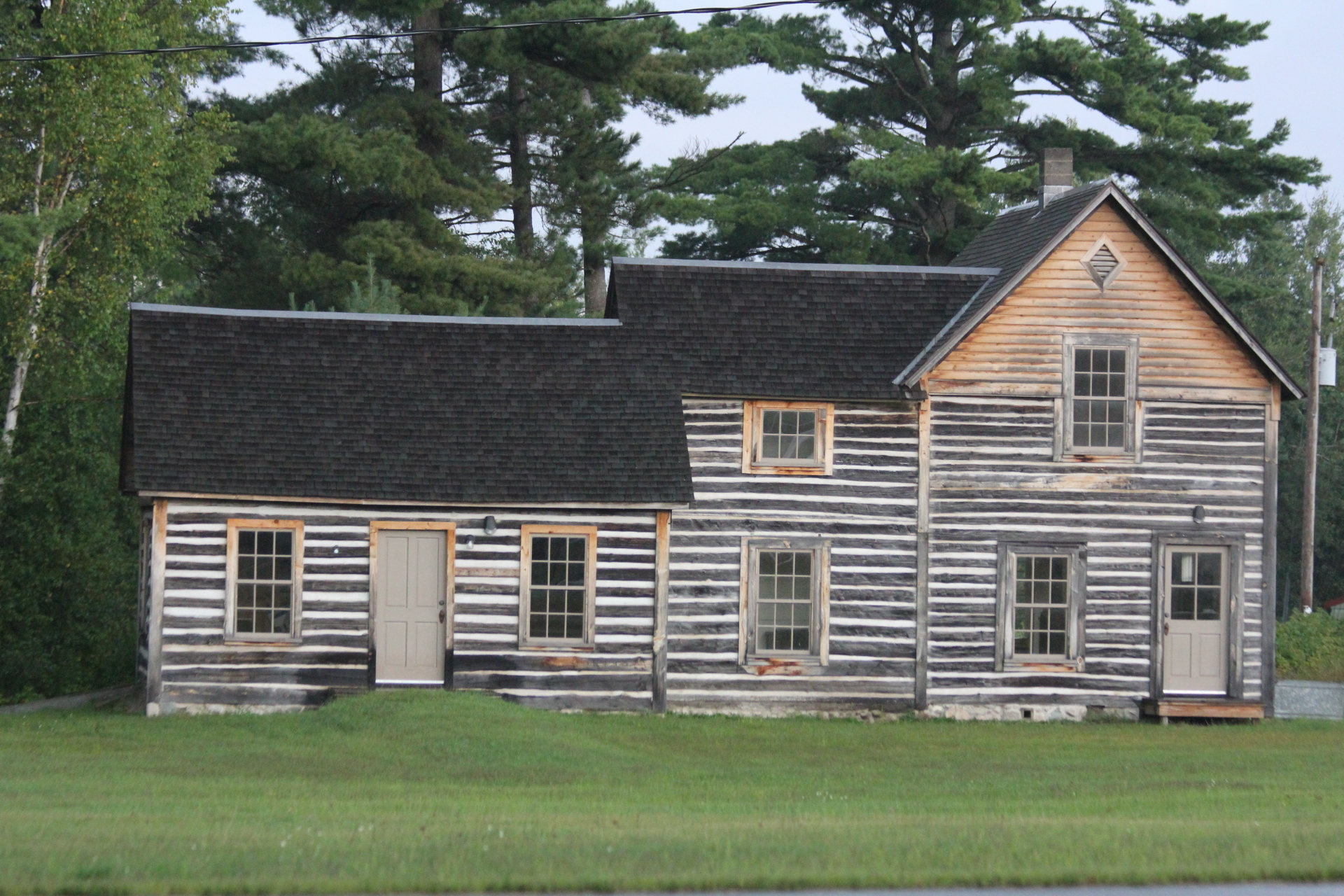
- Dinesen-Motzfeldt-Hettinger Log House in 2013
- Location: 3125 WI 55; Mole Lake, Wisconsin
- Coordinates: 45.48734°N 88.9691°W
- Architectural style: Log House
- NRHP reference No.: 04001486
- Added to NRHP: January 12, 2005

The Dinesen-Motzfeldt-Hettninger Log House is located in the community of Mole Lake, Wisconsin in the city of Crandon, Wisconsin. It was added to the National Register of Historic Places in 2005.

== History ==
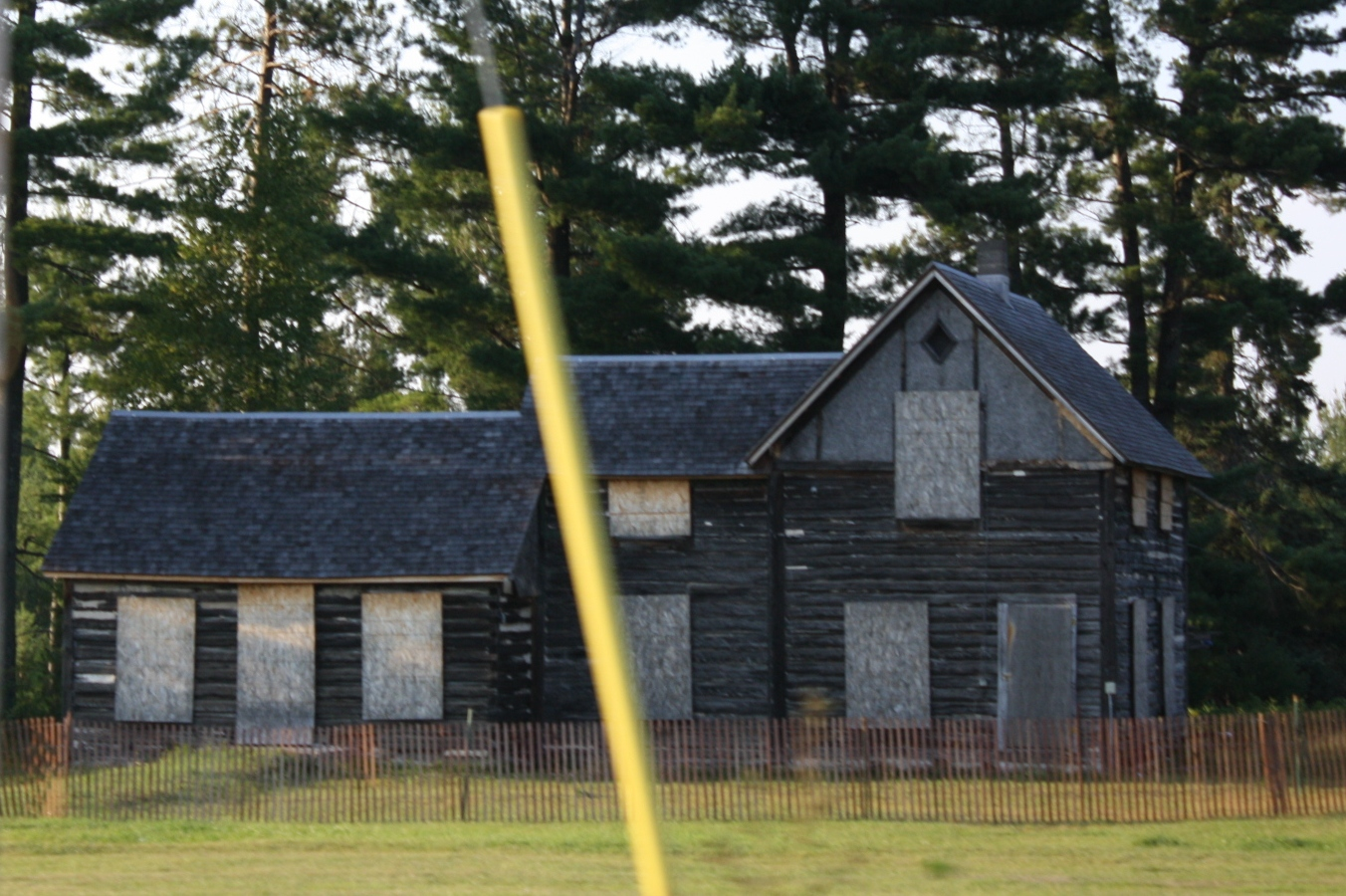
2009, before restoration

The house was first occupied by William Johnson. It was later occupied by Danish immigrant Wilhelm Dinesen, the father of Karen Blixen. During the time Dinesen lived in the house, he called it "Frydenlund", translating to 'grove of joy.' Later, the house became the home of Ludwig Motzfeldt, who also ran a post office of the building and served as Treasurer of Forest County, Wisconsin. In 1905, Joseph and Hattie Hettinger purchased the house.

== See also ==
- Frydenlund
- Rungstedlund
