= Nashville, Wisconsin =

- Town
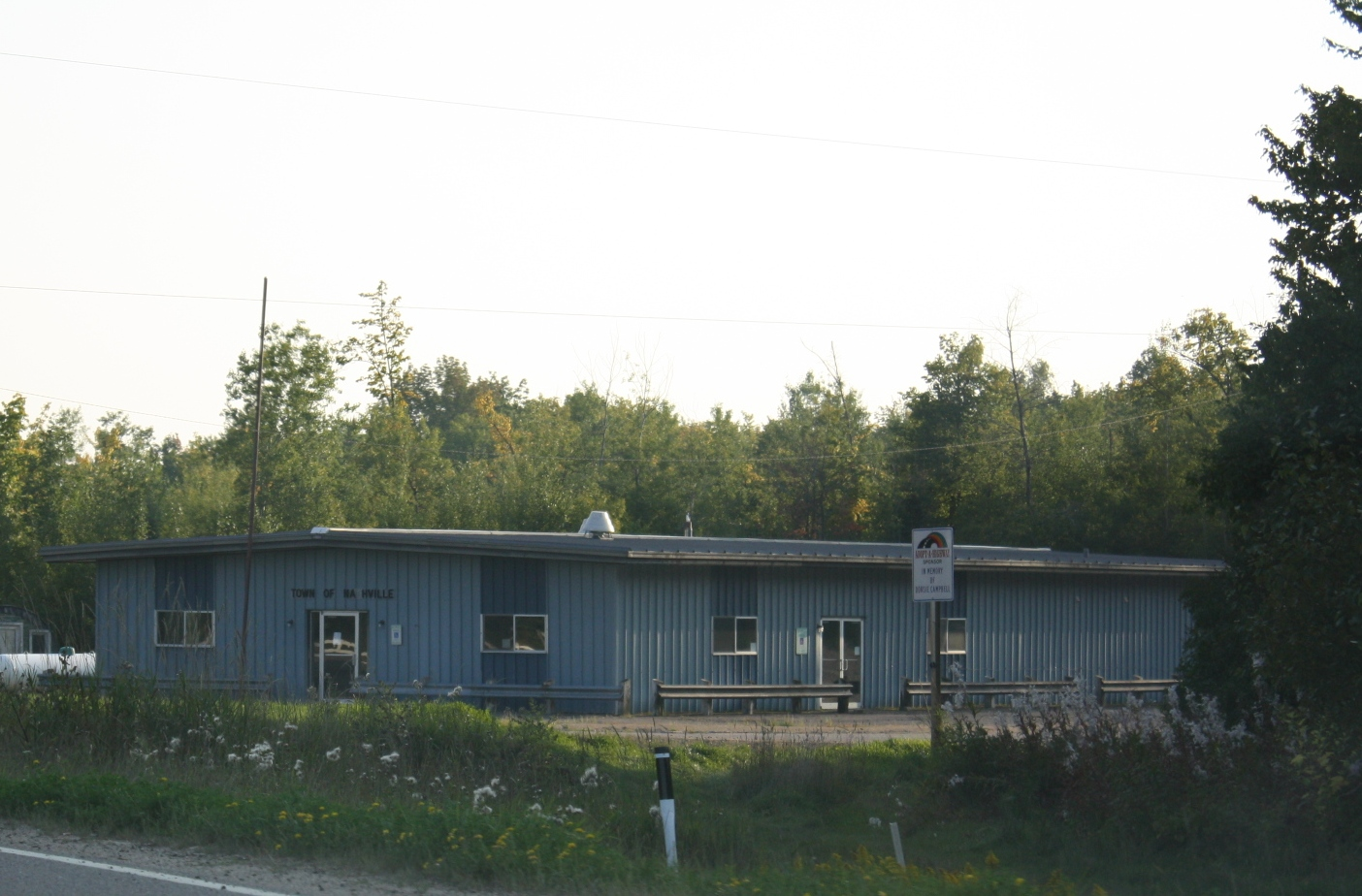
- Town hall

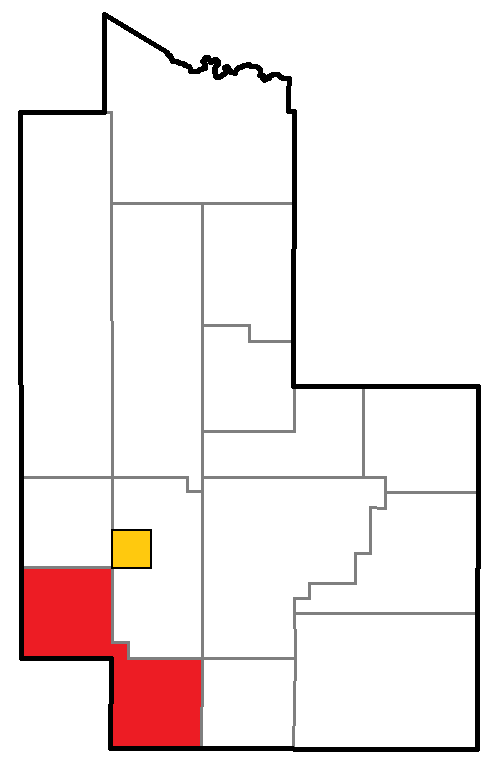
- Location of Nashville, within Forest County
- Coordinates: 45°27′17″N 88°54′38″W
- Country: United States
- State: Wisconsin
- County: Forest

Area
  - Total: 72.4 sq mi (187.4 km^{2})
  - Land: 67.2 sq mi (174.0 km^{2})
  - Water: 5.2 sq mi (13.4 km^{2})
- Elevation: 1,594 ft (486 m)

Population (2020)
  - Total: 1,215
  - Density: 18.09/sq mi (6.983/km^{2})
- Time zone: UTC-6 (Central (CST))
  - Summer (DST): UTC-5 (CDT)
- Area codes: 715 & 534
- FIPS code: 55-55575
- GNIS feature ID: 1583780
- Website: https://nashtownwi.com/

Nashville is a town in Forest County, Wisconsin, United States. The population was 1,215 at the 2020 census. The Mole Lake Indian Reservation is located within the town, as is the census-designated place of Mole Lake. The town is named after G.V. Nash of Forrest City, Arkansas.

The northern half of the township is served by the Crandon Fire Department for fire protection services, and the Crandon Area Rescue Squad for ambulance service. While the southern half of the township is served by the Pickerel Volunteer Fire Department, and the Pickerel Rescue Squad.

== History ==
A post office called Nashville was established in 1902, and remained in operation until it was discontinued in 1944. The community was named for G. V. Nash.

== Geography ==
According to the United States Census Bureau, the town has a total area of 72.3 square miles (187 km^{2}), of which 67.2 square miles (174 km^{2}) is land and 5.2 square miles (13 km^{2}), or 7.16%, is water.

== Demographics ==
As of the census of 2000, there were 1,157 people, 485 households, and 342 families residing in the town. The population density was 17.2 people per square mile (6.7/km^{2}). There were 1,264 housing units at an average density of 18.8 per square mile (7.3/km^{2}). The racial makeup of the town was 67.93% White, 31.29% Native American, 0.09% from other races, and 0.69% from two or more races. Hispanic or Latino of any race were 0.35% of the population.

There were 485 households, out of which 28.7% had children under the age of 18 living with them, 53.2% were married couples living together, 10.9% had a female householder with no husband present, and 29.3% were non-families. 25.4% of all households were made up of individuals, and 8.7% had someone living alone who was 65 years of age or older. The average household size was 2.39 and the average family size was 2.79.

In the town, the population was spread out, with 26.0% under the age of 18, 6.1% from 18 to 24, 24.5% from 25 to 44, 26.4% from 45 to 64, and 16.9% who were 65 years of age or older. The median age was 40 years. For every 100 females, there were 107.0 males. For every 100 females age 18 and over, there were 99.1 males.

The median income for a household in the town was $29,750, and the median income for a family was $31,680. Males had a median income of $25,909 versus $19,438 for females. The per capita income for the town was $16,013. About 11.7% of families and 16.8% of the population were below the poverty line, including 27.8% of those under age 18 and 7.0% of those age 65 or over.
