= Cavour, Wisconsin =

- Unincorporated community
- Location within Wisconsin Location within the United States
- Coordinates: 45°39′03″N 88°37′46″W
- Country: United States
- State: Wisconsin
- County: Forest
- Elevation: 1,473 ft (449 m)
- Time zone: UTC-6 (Central (CST))
  - Summer (DST): UTC-5 (CDT)
- Area codes: 715 & 534
- GNIS feature ID: 1578963

Cavour is an unincorporated community in Forest County, Wisconsin, United States. Cavour is located in the town of Caswell, 14.5 miles (23.3 km) east-northeast of Crandon.

== Notable people ==
- Neil McEachin, Wisconsin lawyer, judge, and politician, was born in Cavour.
