= Hiles (community), Wisconsin =

Hiles, Wisconsin
- Unincorporated community
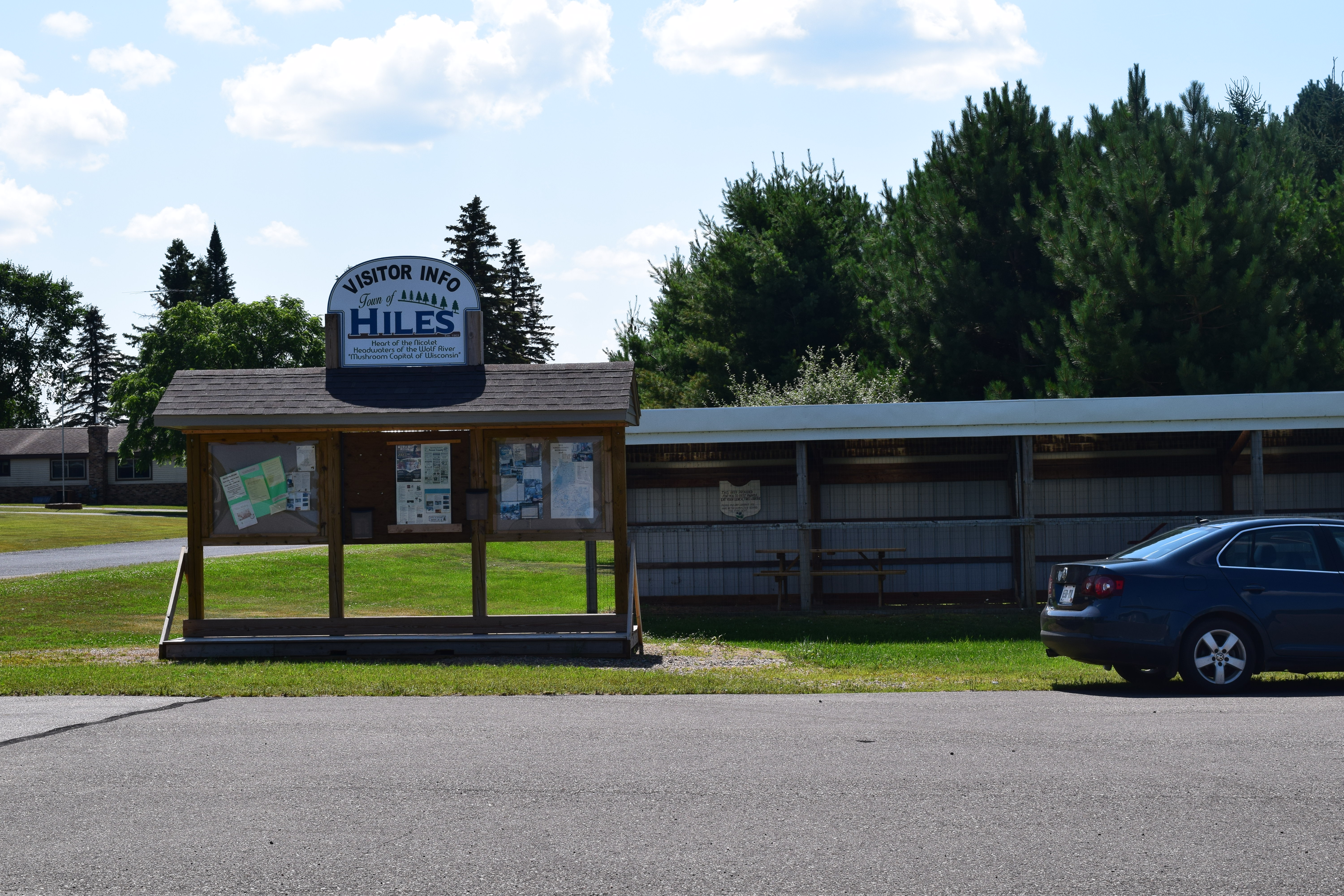
- Visitor information board in Hiles

- Location within Wisconsin Location within the United States
- Coordinates: 45°42′14″N 88°58′38″W
- Country: United States
- State: Wisconsin
- County: Forest
- Elevation: 1,663 ft (507 m)
- Time zone: UTC-6 (Central (CST))
  - Summer (DST): UTC-5 (CDT)
- Area codes: 715 & 534
- GNIS feature ID: 1579449

Hiles is an unincorporated community in the town of Hiles, Forest County, Wisconsin, United States. Hiles is located on Wisconsin Highway 32, 10 miles (16 km) north-northwest of Crandon.

== History ==
A post office called Hiles was established in 1903, and remained in operation until it was discontinued in 1968. The community was named for F. P. Hiles, a lumber baron.

== Religion ==
Christ Lutheran Church is a church of the Wisconsin Evangelical Lutheran Synod in Hiles.
