= Bonneval, Wisconsin =

- Unincorporated community
- Location within Wisconsin Location within the United States
- Coordinates: 45°39′02″N 88°32′19″W
- Country: United States
- State: Wisconsin
- County: Forest
- Elevation: 1,516 ft (462 m)
- Time zone: UTC-6 (Central (CST))
  - Summer (DST): UTC-5 (CDT)
- Area codes: 715 & 534
- GNIS feature ID: 1578832

Bonneval is an unincorporated community in the town of Armstrong Creek, Forest County, Wisconsin, United States. Bonneval is located along the Canadian National Railway, 18.5 miles (29.8 km) east-northeast of Crandon.
