= Popple River, Wisconsin =

- Town
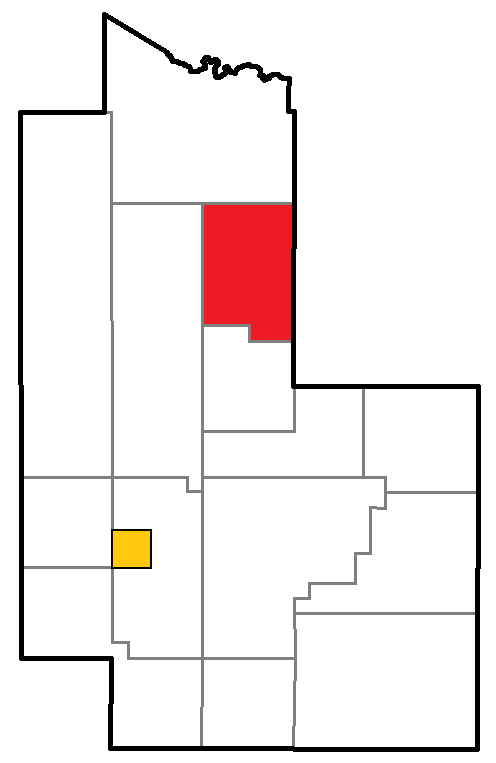
- Location of Popple River, within Forest County
- Coordinates: 45°49′53″N 88°43′28″W
- Country: United States
- State: Wisconsin
- County: Forest

Area
  - Total: 50.5 sq mi (130.7 km^{2})
  - Land: 50.1 sq mi (129.7 km^{2})
  - Water: 0.39 sq mi (1.0 km^{2})
- Elevation: 1,581 ft (482 m)

Population (2020)
  - Total: 43
  - Density: 0.86/sq mi (0.33/km^{2})
- Time zone: UTC-6 (Central (CST))
  - Summer (DST): UTC-5 (CDT)
- Area codes: 715 & 534
- FIPS code: 55-64050
- GNIS feature ID: 1583952
- Website: https://poppleriverwi.gov/

Popple River is a town in Forest County, Wisconsin, United States. The population was 43 at the 2020 census.

== Geography ==
According to the United States Census Bureau, the town has a total area of 50.5 square miles (131 km^{2}), of which 50.1 square miles (130 km^{2}) is land and 0.4 square miles (1.0 km^{2}), or 0.77%, is water.

== Demographics ==
As of the census of 2000, there were 79 people, 37 households, and 25 families residing in the town. The population density was 1.6 people per square mile (0.6/km^{2}). There were 128 housing units at an average density of 2.6 per square mile (1.0/km^{2}). The racial makeup of the town was 89.87% White and 10.13% Asian.

There were 37 households, out of which 10.8% had children under the age of 18 living with them, 64.9% were married couples living together, 2.7% had a female householder with no husband present, and 32.4% were non-families. 29.7% of all households were made up of individuals, and 13.5% had someone living alone who was 65 years of age or older. The average household size was 2.14 and the average family size was 2.64.

In the town, the population was spread out, with 8.9% under the age of 18, 6.3% from 18 to 24, 16.5% from 25 to 44, 34.2% from 45 to 64, and 34.2% who were 65 years of age or older. The median age was 54 years. For every 100 females, there were 97.5 males. For every 100 females age 18 and over, there were 111.8 males.

The median income for a household in the town was $30,000, and the median income for a family was $31,750. Males had a median income of $35,625 versus $19,375 for females. The per capita income for the town was $13,865. There were no families and 3.6% of the population living below the poverty line, including no under eighteens and none of those over 64.
