= Mole Lake, Wisconsin =

Census-designated place in Wisconsin, United States

- Census-designated place
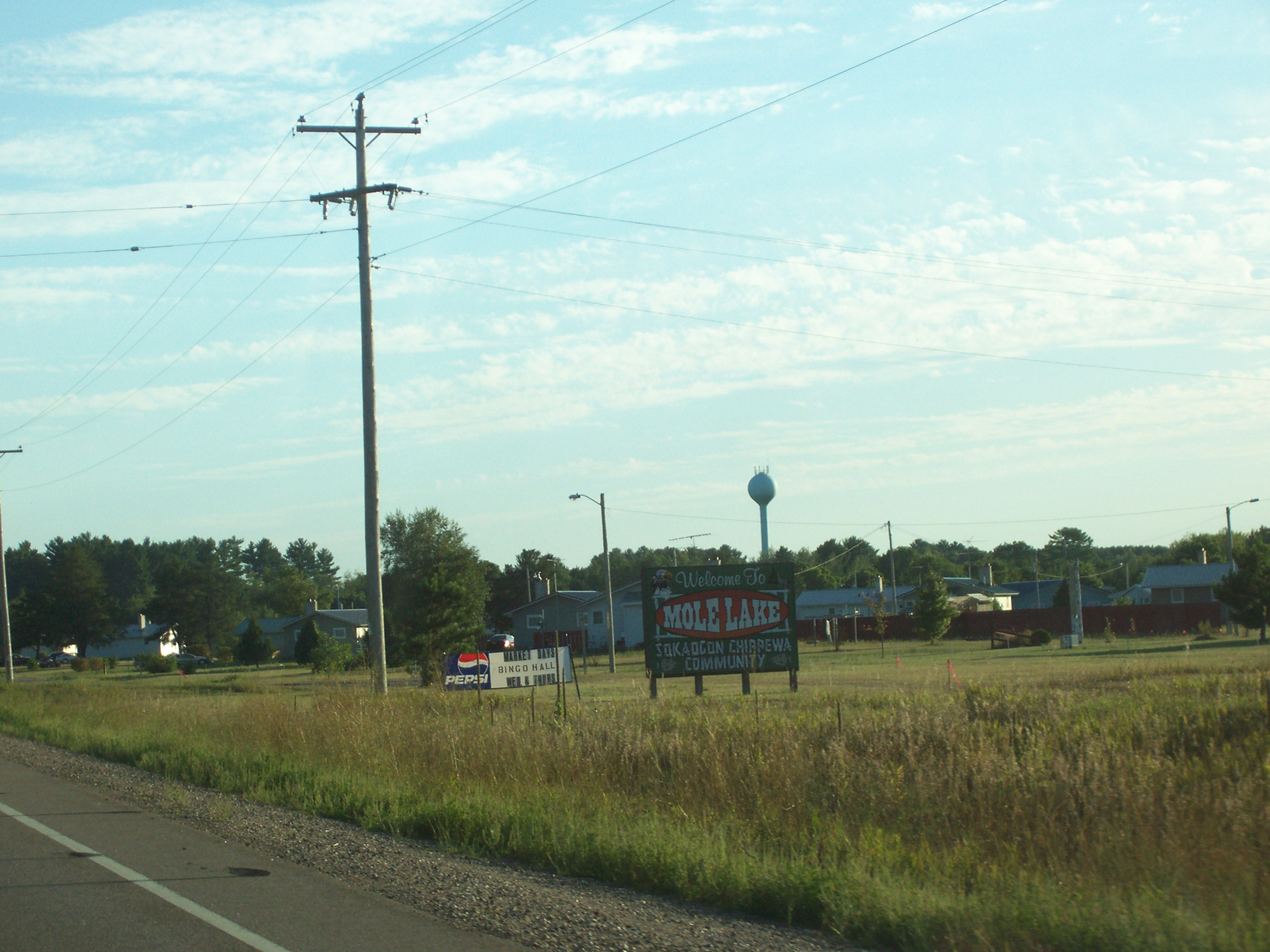
- Welcome sign and houses in Mole Lake

- Location within Wisconsin
- Coordinates: 45°28′47″N 88°58′59″W
- Country: United States
- State: Wisconsin
- County: Forest

Area
  - Total: 4.160 sq mi (10.77 km^{2})
  - Land: 3.698 sq mi (9.58 km^{2})
  - Water: 0.462 sq mi (1.20 km^{2})
- Elevation: 1,552 ft (473 m)

Population (2020)
  - Total: 535
  - Density: 145/sq mi (55.9/km^{2})
- Time zone: UTC-6 (Central (CST))
  - Summer (DST): UTC-5 (CDT)
- Area codes: 715 & 534
- FIPS Code: 55-53500
- GNIS feature ID: 1569643

Mole Lake is a census-designated place located in the town of Nashville in Forest County, Wisconsin, United States. The population was 535 at the 2020 census, up from 435 at the 2010 census.

== Description ==
The community is located on Wisconsin Highway 55 in the Mole Lake Indian Reservation. As of the 2010 census, its population is 435. Mole Lake has an area of 4.160 square miles (10.77 km^{2}); 3.698 square miles (9.58 km^{2}) of this is land, and 0.462 square miles (1.20 km^{2}) is water. It is named after the Mole Lake tribe. The tribe's Mole Lake Casino is located in the community.

== Images ==
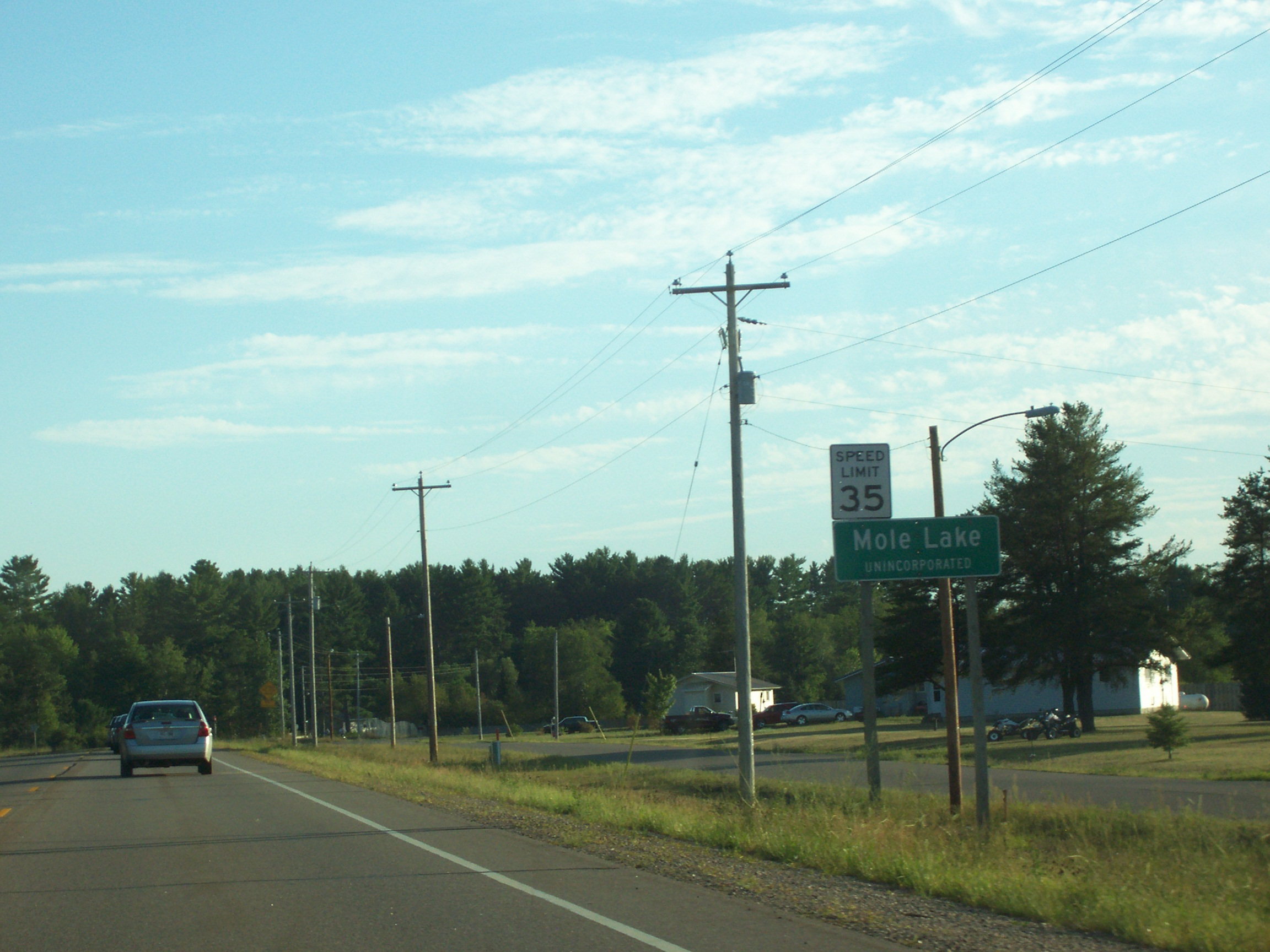
Road sign

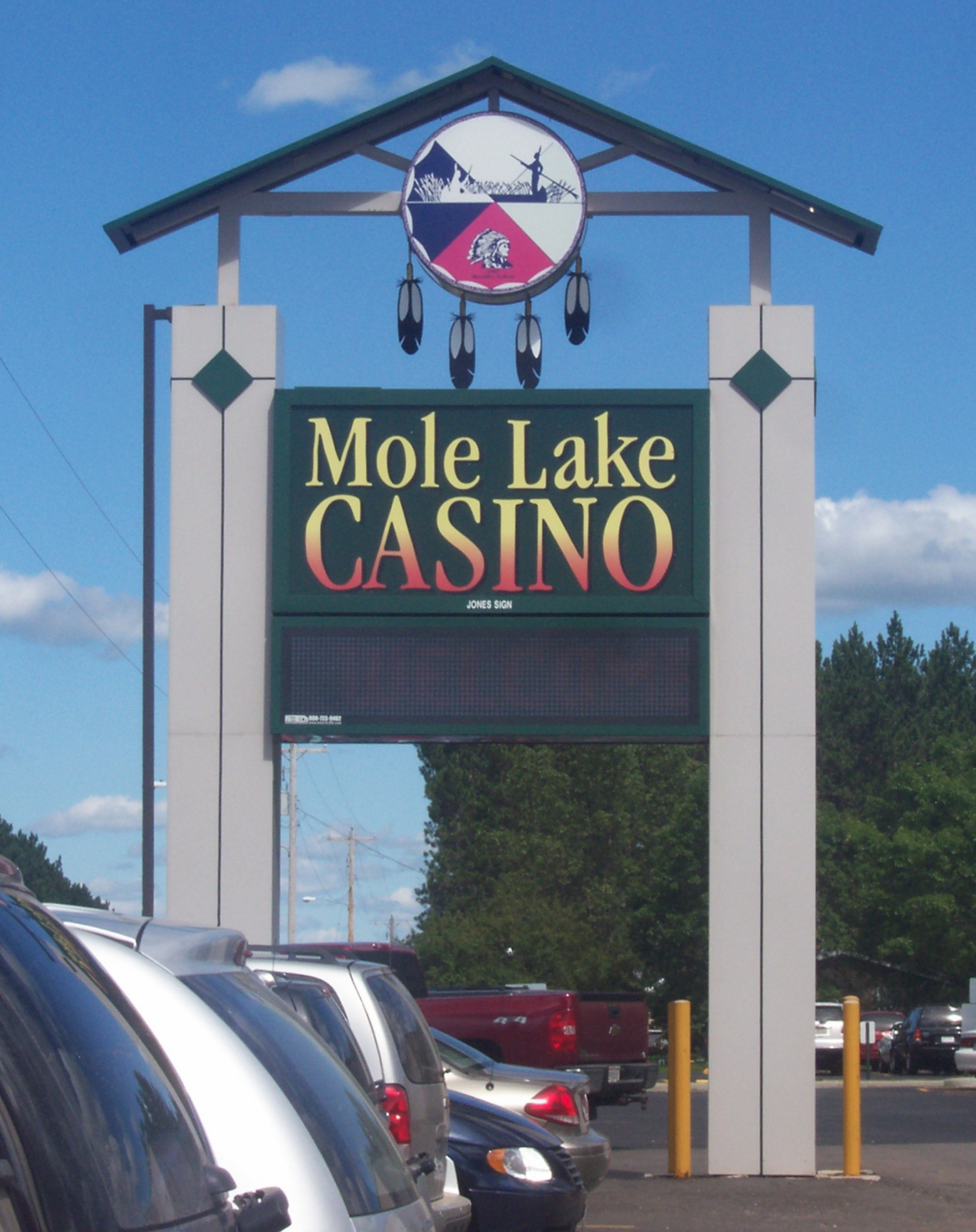
Mole Lake Casino

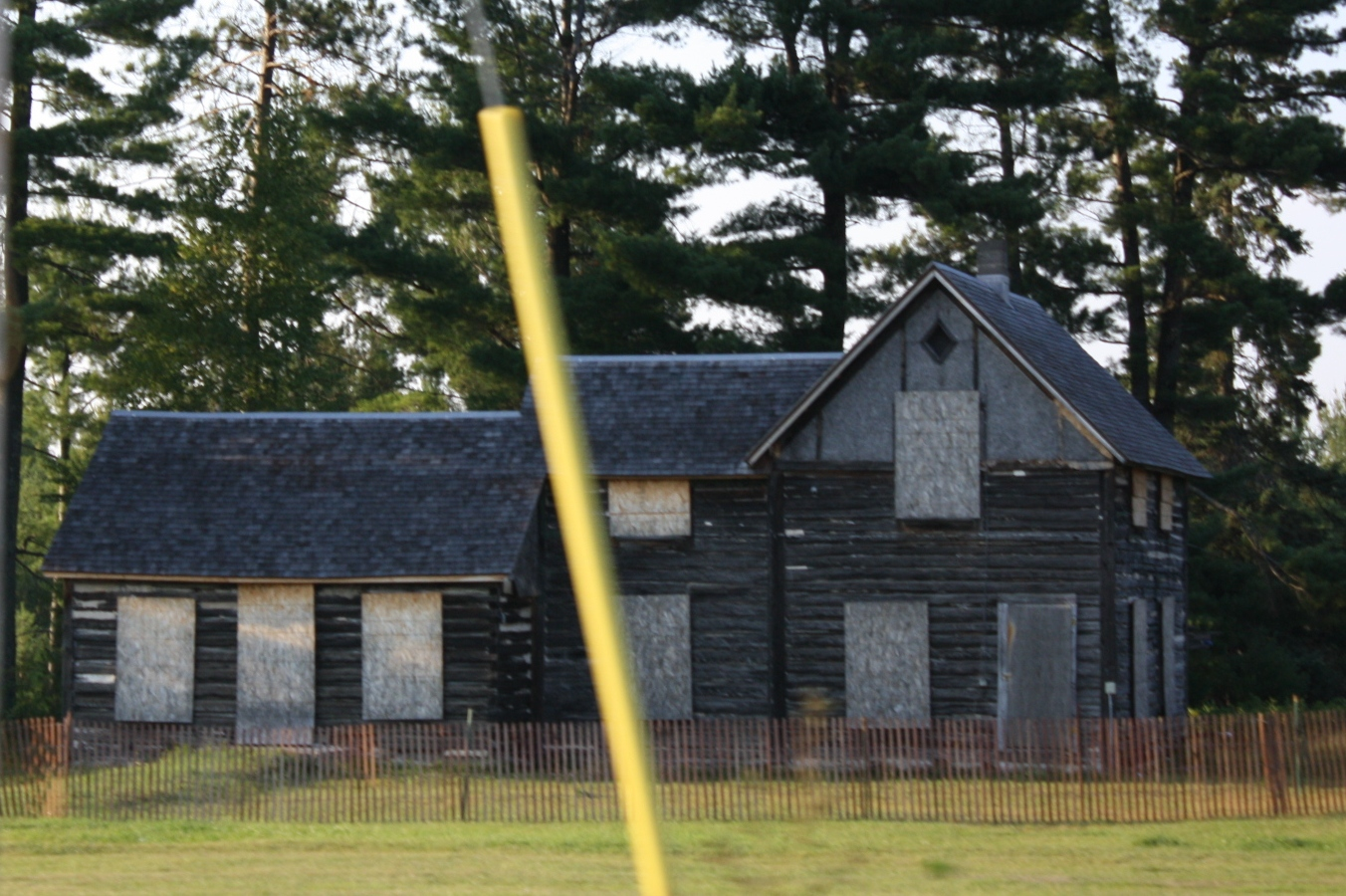
Historic Dinesen-Motzfeldt-Hettinger Log House before restoration, listed on the National Register of Historic Places

== See also ==
- List of census-designated places in Wisconsin

== See also ==
Media related to Mole Lake, Wisconsin at Wikimedia Commons
