= Carter, Forest County, Wisconsin =

Carter, Wisconsin
- Unincorporated community
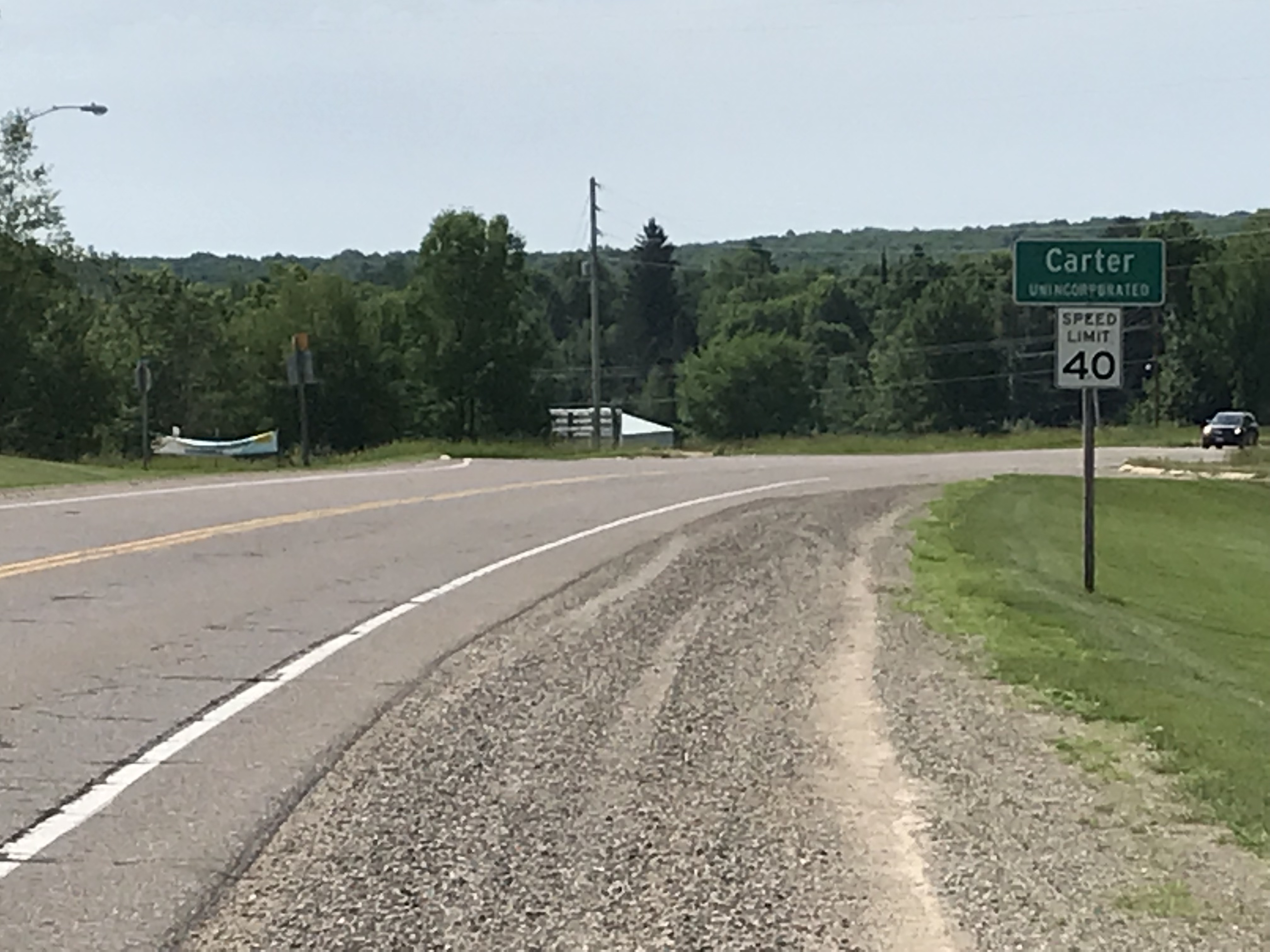
- Looking south at Carter

- Location within Wisconsin
- Coordinates: 45°23′26″N 88°37′40″W
- Country: United States
- State: Wisconsin
- County: Forest
- Elevation: 1,516 ft (462 m)
- Time zone: UTC-6 (Central (CST))
  - Summer (DST): UTC-5 (CDT)
- Area codes: 715 & 534
- GNIS feature ID: 1578953

Carter is an unincorporated community in the town of Wabeno in Forest County, Wisconsin, United States. WIS 32 travels north-south through the community.

== History ==
A post office was established as Carter in 1897, and remained in operation until it was discontinued in 1955. The community was named for John Carpenter, a settler who built the first house.

In 1992, Potawatomi Casino and Hotel was built.

=== Historic district ===
- Minertown-Oneva, mining district
