= Newald, Wisconsin =

Census-designated place in Wisconsin, United States

- Census-designated place
- Location within Wisconsin
- Coordinates: 45°44′19″N 88°42′19″W
- Country: United States
- State: Wisconsin
- County: Forest

Area
  - Total: 0.820 sq mi (2.12 km^{2})
  - Land: 0.820 sq mi (2.12 km^{2})
  - Water: 0 sq mi (0 km^{2})
- Elevation: 1,572 ft (479 m)

Population (2020)
  - Total: 70
  - Density: 85/sq mi (33/km^{2})
- Time zone: UTC-6 (Central (CST))
  - Summer (DST): UTC-5 (CDT)
- Area codes: 715 & 534
- GNIS feature ID: 1580002

Newald (also Ross) is an unincorporated census-designated place in the town of Ross, Forest County, Wisconsin, United States. Newald is located near Wisconsin Highway 139, 15 miles (24 km) northeast of Crandon. As of the 2020 census, its population was 70.

== History ==
Newald was originally called Ross, for Charles Ross, a pioneer settler, and under the latter name was platted in 1905. The community was renamed Newald in 1906 in honor of a local landowner. A post office was established as Newald in 1905, and remained in operation until it was discontinued in 1985.

"A car of building material, including camp supplies, teams, sleighs, etc., was loaded out from here last Tuesday, enroute for the new town of Newald, some ten to twelve miles north of Carver, and on the line from Laona to Sauders now under course of construction. Messrs. Newald [ Leopold J Newald ] and Isaacson of Gillett are the promoters of this new proposed metropolis of the north. A hotel, store, mill, blacksmith shop and of course last but not least, a saloon, are already arranged for and will be in operation at the earliest possible time. E. H. Greenthal, a young, level headed business man, well known here, will have immediate personal charge of the new town's affairs, he accompanying the first consignment of material for this new Eldorado, Tuesday." Source: - Gillett Times - Oconto Falls Herald January 27, 1905

== Demographics ==
Historical population
Census	Pop.	Note	%±
2010	95		—
2020	70		−26.3%
U.S. Decennial Census
