= Lincoln, Forest County, Wisconsin =

Lincoln, Wisconsin
- Town
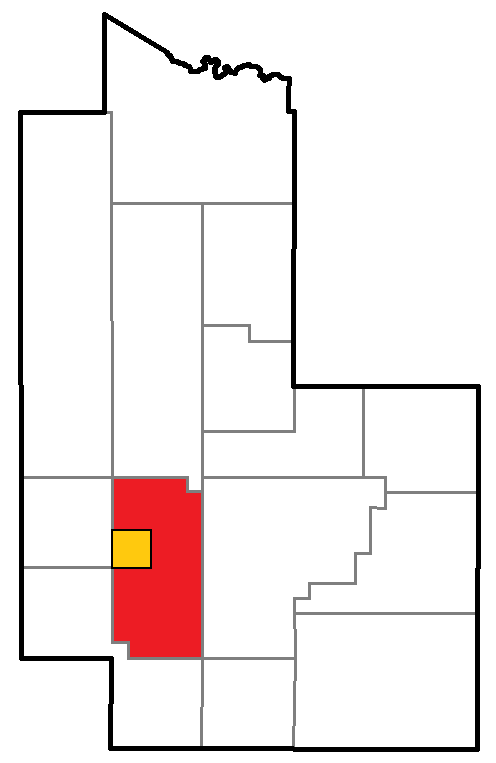
- Location of Lincoln, within Forest County
- Coordinates: 45°32′15″N 88°51′23″W
- Country: United States
- State: Wisconsin
- County: Forest

Area
  - Total: 62.9 sq mi (163.0 km^{2})
  - Land: 58.1 sq mi (150.5 km^{2})
  - Water: 4.8 sq mi (12.4 km^{2})
- Elevation: 1,660 ft (506 m)

Population (2020)
  - Total: 1,133
  - Density: 19.50/sq mi (7.528/km^{2})
- Time zone: UTC-6 (Central (CST))
  - Summer (DST): UTC-5 (CDT)
- Area codes: 715 & 534
- FIPS code: 55-44375
- GNIS feature ID: 1583565
- Website: https://www.townoflincolnwi.com/

Lincoln is a town in Forest County, Wisconsin, United States. The population was 1,133 at the 2020 census. The ghost town of Keith was located within Lincoln.

== Geography ==
According to the United States Census Bureau, the town has a total area of 62.9 square miles (163 km^{2}), of which 58.1 square miles (150 km^{2}) is land and 4.8 square miles (12 km^{2}), or 7.63%, is water.

== Demographics ==
As of the census of 2000, there were 1,005 people, 404 households, and 298 families residing in the town. The population density was 17.3 people per square mile (6.7/km^{2}). There were 998 housing units at an average density of 17.2 per square mile (6.6/km^{2}). The racial makeup of the town was 70.35% White, 0.10% African American, 28.06% Native American, 0.50% from other races, and 1.00% from two or more races. Hispanic or Latino of any race were 2.79% of the population.

There were 404 households, out of which 28.7% had children under the age of 18 living with them, 59.4% were married couples living together, 10.4% had a female householder with no husband present, and 26.2% were non-families. 21.8% of all households were made up of individuals, and 9.7% had someone living alone who was 65 years of age or older. The average household size was 2.49 and the average family size was 2.85.

In the town, the population was spread out, with 26.3% under the age of 18, 6.6% from 18 to 24, 23.7% from 25 to 44, 24.7% from 45 to 64, and 18.8% who were 65 years of age or older. The median age was 40 years. For every 100 females, there were 100.2 males. For every 100 females age 18 and over, there were 97.1 males.

The median income for a household in the town was $44,917, and the median income for a family was $46,731. Males had a median income of $31,477 versus $21,641 for females. The per capita income for the town was $21,602. About 3.9% of families and 7.7% of the population were below the poverty line, including 10.3% of those under age 18 and 2.3% of those age 65 or over.
