= Hiles, Forest County, Wisconsin =

Hiles, Wisconsin
- Town
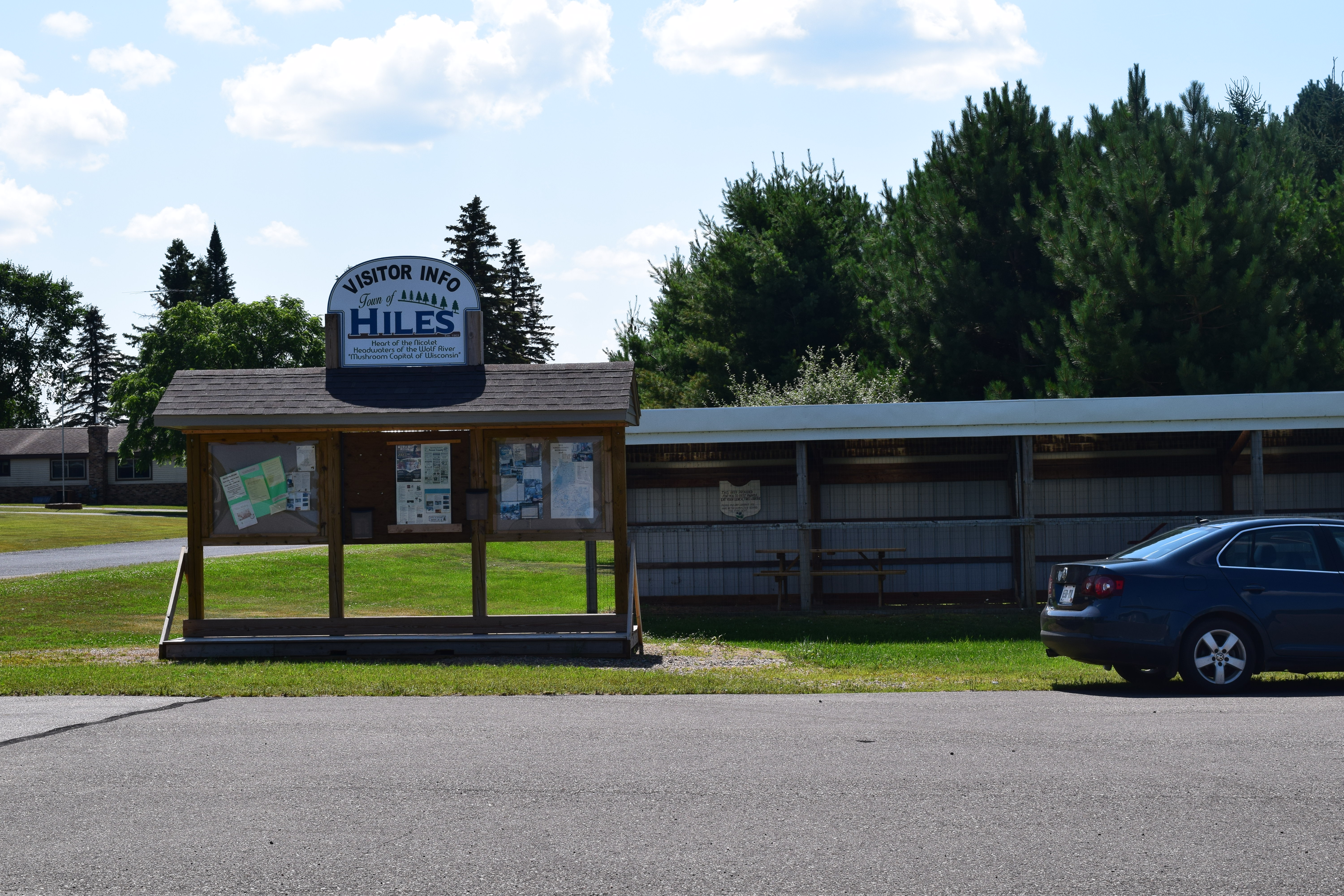
- Visitor information board in Hiles

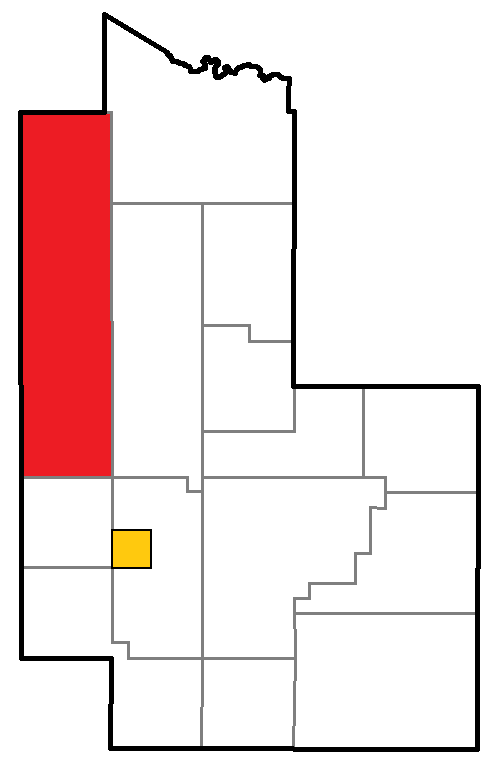
- Location of Hiles, within Forest County
- Coordinates: 45°49′21″N 88°59′29″W
- Country: United States
- State: Wisconsin
- County: Forest
- Organized: 1903

Area
  - Total: 141.0 sq mi (365.1 km^{2})
  - Land: 131.4 sq mi (340.4 km^{2})
  - Water: 9.5 sq mi (24.7 km^{2})
- Elevation: 1,657 ft (505 m)

Population (2020)
  - Total: 359
  - Density: 2.73/sq mi (1.05/km^{2})
- Time zone: UTC-6 (Central (CST))
  - Summer (DST): UTC-5 (CDT)
- Area codes: 715 & 534
- FIPS code: 55-34650
- GNIS feature ID: 1583390

Hiles is a town in Forest County, Wisconsin, United States. The population was 359 at the 2020 census. The unincorporated communities of Atkins and Hiles are located in the town.

== History ==
Hiles is named for Franklin P. Hiles, a major landowner when the town was organized in 1903.

== Geography ==
According to the United States Census Bureau, the town has a total area of 141.0 square miles (365 km^{2}), of which 131.4 square miles (340 km^{2}) is land and 9.5 square miles (25 km^{2}), or 6.75%, is water.

== Demographics ==
At the 2000 census, there were 404 people, 199 households and 143 families residing in the town. The population density was 3.1 per square mile (1.2/km^{2}). There were 761 housing units at an average density of 5.8 per square mile (2.2/km^{2}). The racial makeup of the town was 97.03% White and 2.97% Native American.

There were 199 households, of which 13.1% had children under the age of 18 living with them, 63.3% were married couples living together, 3.5% had a female householder with no husband present, and 28.1% were non-families. 27.1% of all households were made up of individuals, and 14.6% had someone living alone who was 65 years of age or older. The average household size was 2.03 and the average family size was 2.40.

The age distribution was 11.6% under the age of 18, 3.0% from 18 to 24, 13.4% from 25 to 44, 37.6% from 45 to 64, and 34.4% who were 65 years of age or older. The median age was 58 years. For every 100 females, there were 110.4 males. For every 100 females age 18 and over, there were 107.6 males.

The median household income was $26,806, and the median family income was $37,083. Males had a median income of $26,250 versus $21,875 for females. The per capita income for the town was $17,830. About 7.6% of families and 11.9% of the population were below the poverty line, including 40.4% of those under age 18 and 4.3% of those age 65 or over.
