= Armstrong Creek, Wisconsin =

- Town
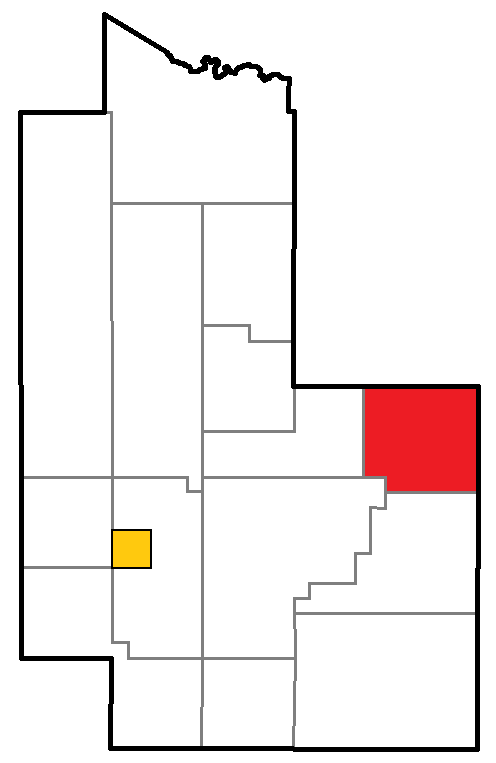
- Location of Armstrong Creek, within Forest County
- Coordinates: 45°40′2″N 88°29′7″W
- Country: United States
- State: Wisconsin
- County: Forest

Area
  - Total: 48.6 sq mi (126.0 km^{2})
  - Land: 48.0 sq mi (124.3 km^{2})
  - Water: 0.66 sq mi (1.7 km^{2})
- Elevation: 1,480 ft (450 m)

Population (2020)
  - Total: 422
  - Density: 8.79/sq mi (3.40/km^{2})
- Time zone: UTC-6 (Central (CST))
  - Summer (DST): UTC-5 (CDT)
- Area codes: 715 & 534
- FIPS code: 55-02950
- GNIS feature ID: 1582717
- Website: https://armstrongcreek.org/

Armstrong Creek is a town in Forest County, Wisconsin, United States. The population was 422 at the 2020 census. The unincorporated communities of Armstrong Creek and Bonneval are located within the town.

== Geography ==
According to the United States Census Bureau, the town has a total area of 48.6 square miles (126 km^{2}), of which 48.0 square miles (124 km^{2}) is land and 0.6 square miles (1.6 km^{2}), or 1.34%, is water.

== Demographics ==
As of the census of 2000, there were 463 people, 207 households, and 125 families residing in the town. The population density was 9.6 people per square mile (3.7/km^{2}). There were 422 housing units at an average density of 8.8 per square mile (3.4/km^{2}). The racial makeup of the town was 97.41% White, 1.94% Native American, 0.43% Pacific Islander, and 0.22% from two or more races. Hispanic or Latino of any race were 1.94% of the population.

There were 207 households, out of which 25.6% had children under the age of 18 living with them, 52.2% were married couples living together, 5.3% had a female householder with no husband present, and 39.6% were non-families. 35.3% of all households were made up of individuals, and 24.2% had someone living alone who was 65 years of age or older. The average household size was 2.24 and the average family size was 2.90.

In the town, the population was spread out, with 23.3% under the age of 18, 3.7% from 18 to 24, 22.5% from 25 to 44, 26.3% from 45 to 64, and 24.2% who were 65 years of age or older. The median age was 46 years. For every 100 females, there were 107.6 males. For every 100 females age 18 and over, there were 104.0 males.

The median income for a household in the town was $27,500, and the median income for a family was $43,125. Males had a median income of $30,625 versus $19,167 for females. The per capita income for the town was $18,266. About 7.4% of families and 9.7% of the population were below the poverty line, including 12.9% of those under age 18 and 13.1% of those age 65 or over.

== Notable people ==
- Jerome T. Schwartz, logger, businessman, and legislator, lived in the town
