= Forest County, Wisconsin =

County in Wisconsin, United States

- County
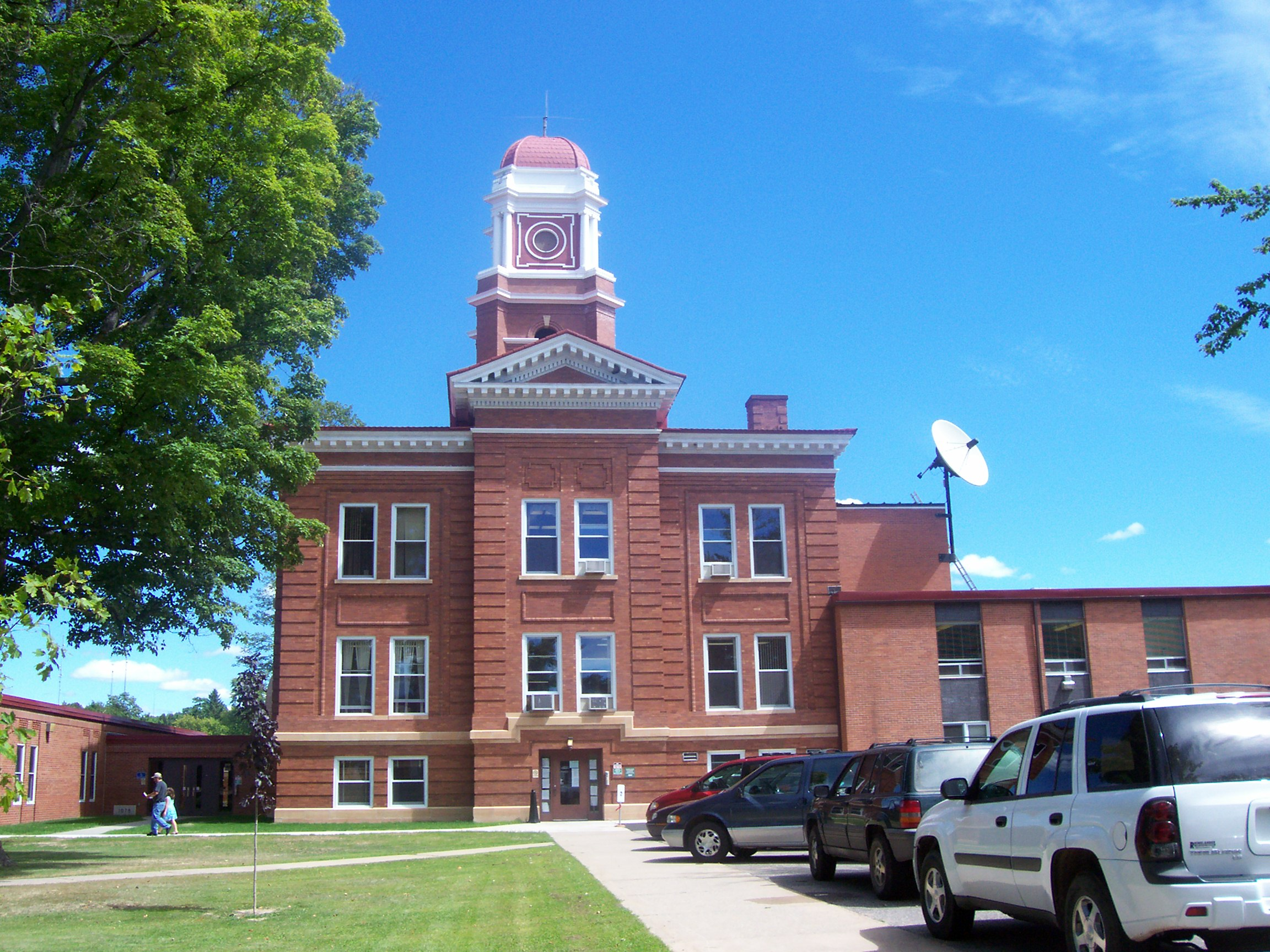
- Forest County Courthouse

- Location within the U.S. state of Wisconsin
- Coordinates: 45°40′N 88°47′W
- Country: United States
- State: Wisconsin
- Founded: 1885
- Seat: Crandon
- Largest city: Crandon

Area
  - Total: 1,046 sq mi (2,710 km^{2})
  - Land: 1,014 sq mi (2,630 km^{2})
  - Water: 32 sq mi (83 km^{2}) 3.1%

Population (2020)
  - Total: 9,179
  - Estimate (2025): 9,574 ▲
  - Density: 9.1/sq mi (3.5/km^{2})
- Time zone: UTC−6 (Central)
  - Summer (DST): UTC−5 (CDT)
- Congressional district: 7th
- Website: www.co.forest.wi.gov

Forest County is a county in the U.S. state of Wisconsin. As of the 2020 census, the population was 9,179. Its county seat is Crandon. The Forest County Potawatomi Community and the Sokaogon Chippewa Community have reservations in Forest County.

The county is considered a high-recreation retirement destination by the U.S. Department of Agriculture.

== History ==
Forest County was created by the Wisconsin State Legislature in 1885 from portions of neighboring Langlade and Oconto counties. The county was named for the forests contained within its limits.

== Geography ==
According to the U.S. Census Bureau, the county has a total area of 1,046 square miles (2,710 km^{2}), of which 1,014 square miles (2,630 km^{2}) is land and 32 square miles (83 km^{2}) (3.1%) is water. The second highest elevation in the state of Wisconsin is Sugarbush hill which is in Forest County.

=== Adjacent counties ===
- Florence County – northeast
- Marinette County – east
- Oconto County – southeast
- Langlade County – southwest
- Oneida County – west
- Vilas County – northwest
- Iron County, Michigan – north

=== Major highways ===
- U.S. Highway 8
- Highway 32 (Wisconsin)
- Highway 52 (Wisconsin)
- Highway 55 (Wisconsin)
- Highway 70 (Wisconsin)
- Highway 101 (Wisconsin)
- Highway 139 (Wisconsin)

=== Railroads ===
- Watco

=== Airport ===
- Y55 – Crandon Municipal Airport

=== National protected area ===
- Nicolet National Forest (part)

== Demographics ==
Historical population
| Census | Pop. | Note | %± |
|---|---|---|---|
| 1890 | 1,012 | | — |
| 1900 | 1,396 | | 37.9% |
| 1910 | 6,782 | | 385.8% |
| 1920 | 9,850 | | 45.2% |
| 1930 | 11,118 | | 12.9% |
| 1940 | 11,805 | | 6.2% |
| 1950 | 9,437 | | −20.1% |
| 1960 | 7,542 | | −20.1% |
| 1970 | 7,691 | | 2.0% |
| 1980 | 9,044 | | 17.6% |
| 1990 | 8,776 | | −3.0% |
| 2000 | 10,024 | | 14.2% |
| 2010 | 9,304 | | −7.2% |
| 2020 | 9,179 | | −1.3% |
| 2025 (est.) | 9,574 | ▲ | 4.3% |
U.S. Decennial Census; 1790–1960 1900–1990; 1990–2000 2010 2020

=== Racial and ethnic composition ===
Forest County, Wisconsin – Racial and ethnic composition Note: the US Census treats Hispanic/Latino as an ethnic category. This table excludes Latinos from the racial categories and assigns them to a separate category. Hispanics/Latinos may be of any race.
| Race / ethnicity (NH = Non-Hispanic) | Pop 1980 | Pop 1990 | Pop 2000 | Pop 2010 | Pop 2020 | % 1980 | % 1990 | % 2000 | % 2010 | % 2020 |
|---|---|---|---|---|---|---|---|---|---|---|
| White alone (NH) | 8,407 | 7,828 | 8,570 | 7,646 | 7,371 | 92.96% | 89.20% | 85.49% | 82.18% | 80.30% |
| Black or African American alone (NH) | 88 | 125 | 118 | 71 | 32 | 0.97% | 1.42% | 1.18% | 0.76% | 0.35% |
| Native American or Alaska Native alone (NH) | 499 | 776 | 1,096 | 1,213 | 1,187 | 5.52% | 8.84% | 10.93% | 13.04% | 12.93% |
| Asian alone (NH) | 16 | 14 | 17 | 12 | 17 | 0.18% | 0.16% | 0.17% | 0.13% | 0.19% |
| Native Hawaiian or Pacific Islander alone (NH) | x | x | 4 | 11 | 7 | x | x | 0.04% | 0.12% | 0.08% |
| Other race alone (NH) | 9 | 3 | 1 | 4 | 3 | 0.10% | 0.03% | 0.01% | 0.04% | 0.03% |
| Mixed race or Multiracial (NH) | x | x | 110 | 209 | 407 | x | x | 1.10% | 2.25% | 4.43% |
| Hispanic or Latino (any race) | 25 | 30 | 108 | 138 | 155 | 0.28% | 0.34% | 1.08% | 1.48% | 1.69% |
| Total | 9,044 | 8,776 | 10,024 | 9,304 | 9,179 | 100.00% | 100.00% | 100.00% | 100.00% | 100.00% |

=== 2020 census ===
As of the 2020 census, the county had a population of 9,179. The population density was 9.1 people per square mile (3.5 people/km^{2}). There were 8,604 housing units at an average density of 8.5 units per square mile (3.3 units/km^{2}).

The median age was 49.5 years, 20.4% of residents were under the age of 18, and 25.9% were 65 years of age or older. For every 100 females there were 104.9 males, and for every 100 females age 18 and over there were 105.1 males age 18 and over.

The racial makeup of the county was 80.7% White, 0.3% Black or African American, 13.4% American Indian and Alaska Native, 0.2% Asian, 0.1% Native Hawaiian and Pacific Islander, 0.2% from some other race, and 5.1% from two or more races. Hispanic or Latino residents of any race comprised 1.7% of the population.

<0.1% of residents lived in urban areas, while 100.0% lived in rural areas.

There were 4,034 households in the county, of which 23.2% had children under the age of 18 living in them. Of all households, 46.7% were married-couple households, 22.8% were households with a male householder and no spouse or partner present, and 22.9% were households with a female householder and no spouse or partner present. About 32.0% of all households were made up of individuals and 15.9% had someone living alone who was 65 years of age or older. Of the 8,604 housing units, 53.1% were vacant. Among occupied housing units, 79.8% were owner-occupied and 20.2% were renter-occupied. The homeowner vacancy rate was 2.4% and the rental vacancy rate was 12.3%.

=== 2000 census ===
2000 Census Age Pyramid for Forest County

As of the census of 2000, there were 10,024 people, 4,043 households, and 2,769 families residing in the county. The population density was 10 people per square mile (3.9 people/km^{2}). There were 8,322 housing units at an average density of 8 units per square mile (3.1 units/km^{2}). The racial makeup of the county was 85.86% White, 11.30% Native American, 1.18% Black or African American, 0.17% Asian, 0.04% Pacific Islander, 0.23% from other races, and 1.22% from two or more races. 1.08% of the population were Hispanic or Latino of any race. 34.3% were of German, 11.4% Polish, 7.4% Irish and 5.4% American ancestry. 95.5% spoke English, 1.4% Spanish and 1.0% Potawatomi as their first language.

Out of the 4,043 households, 29.20% had children under the age of 18, 54.00% had a married couple living together, 9.80% had a female householder with no husband present, and 31.50% were non-families. 28.20% of all households were made up of individuals living alone, and 13.20%, of individuals of 65 years of age or older living alone. The average household size was 2.39 and the average family size was 2.89.

The age distribution in the county's population was as follows: 25.30% under the age of 18, 7.80% from 18 to 24, 23.90% from 25 to 44, 23.80% from 45 to 64, and 19.30% 65 years of age or older. The median age was 40 years. For every 100 females there were 100.20 males. For every 100 females age 18 and over, there were 99.00 males.

In 2017, there were 102 births, giving a general fertility rate of 71.1 births per 1000 women aged 15–44, the 14th highest rate out of all 72 Wisconsin counties. There were fewer than five reported induced abortions performed on women of Forest County residence in 2017.

== Communities ==
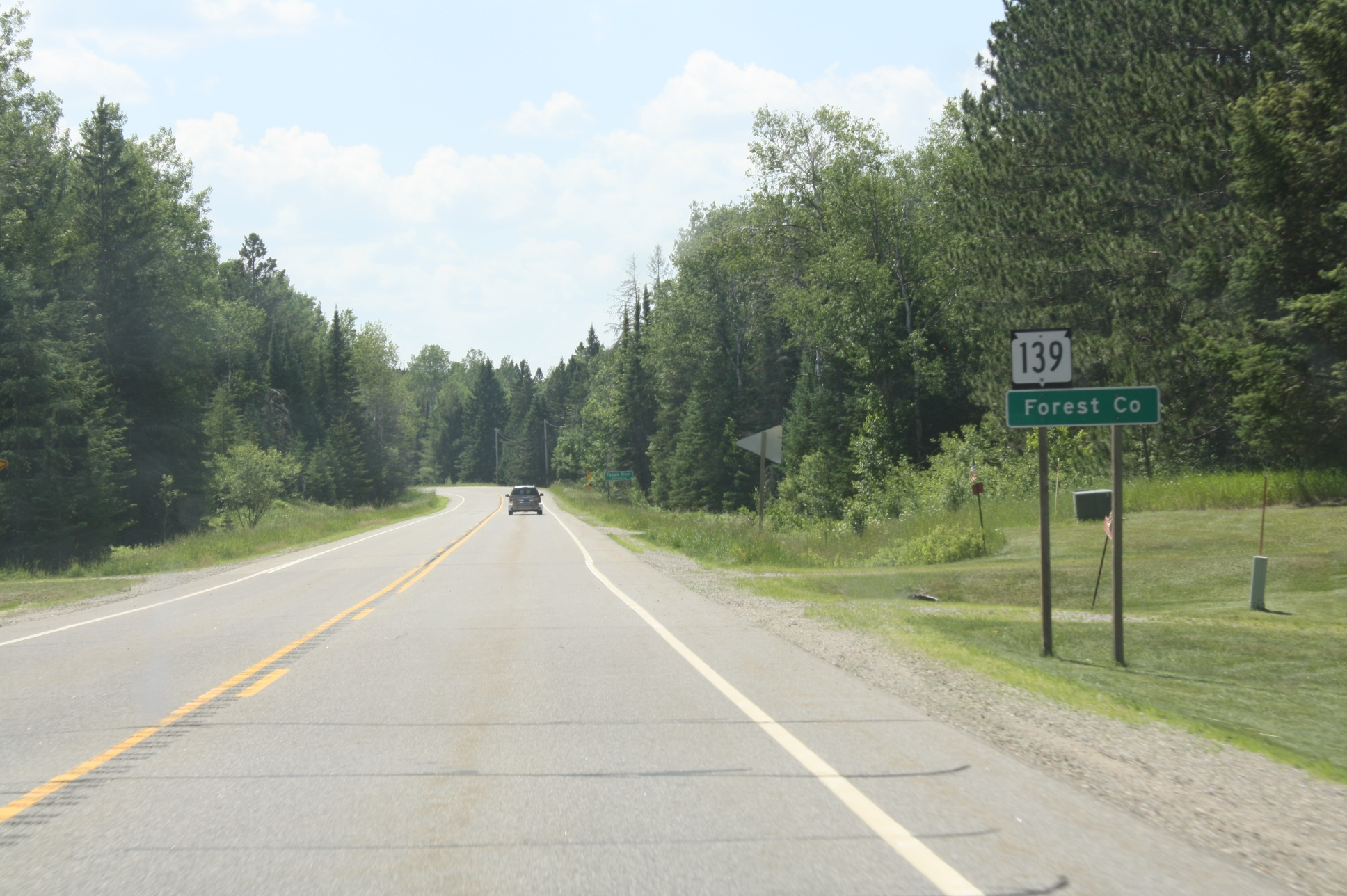
Forest County sign on WIS 139

=== City ===
- Crandon (county seat)

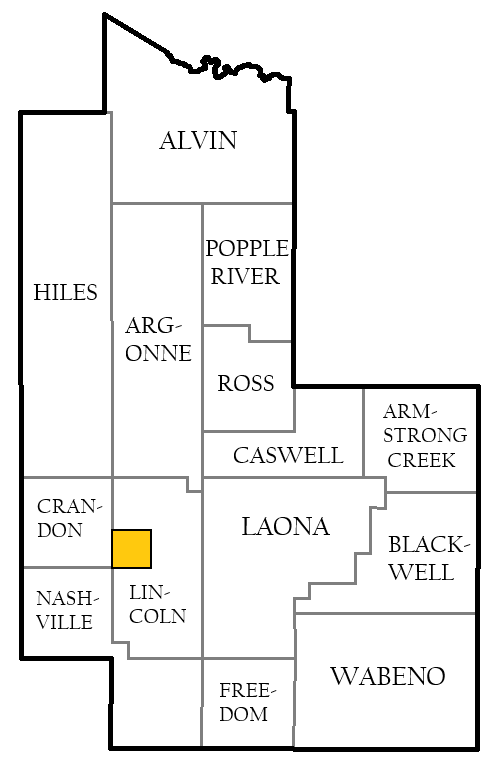
Towns of Forest County

=== Towns ===
- Alvin
- Argonne
- Armstrong Creek
- Blackwell
- Caswell
- Crandon
- Freedom
- Hiles
- Laona
- Lincoln
- Nashville
- Popple River
- Ross
- Wabeno

=== Census-designated places ===
- Argonne
- Laona
- Mole Lake
- Newald
- Wabeno

=== Unincorporated communities ===
- Alvin
- Armstrong Creek
- Atkins
- Blackwell
- Blackwell Junction
- Bonneval
- Carter
- Cavour
- Hiles
- Laona Junction
- Nashville
- Nelma
- Padus
- Popple River
- Soperton
- Wisconsin Junction
- Woodlawn

=== Ghost towns/neighborhoods ===
- Bagdad
- Keith
- Minertown-Oneva

== Images ==
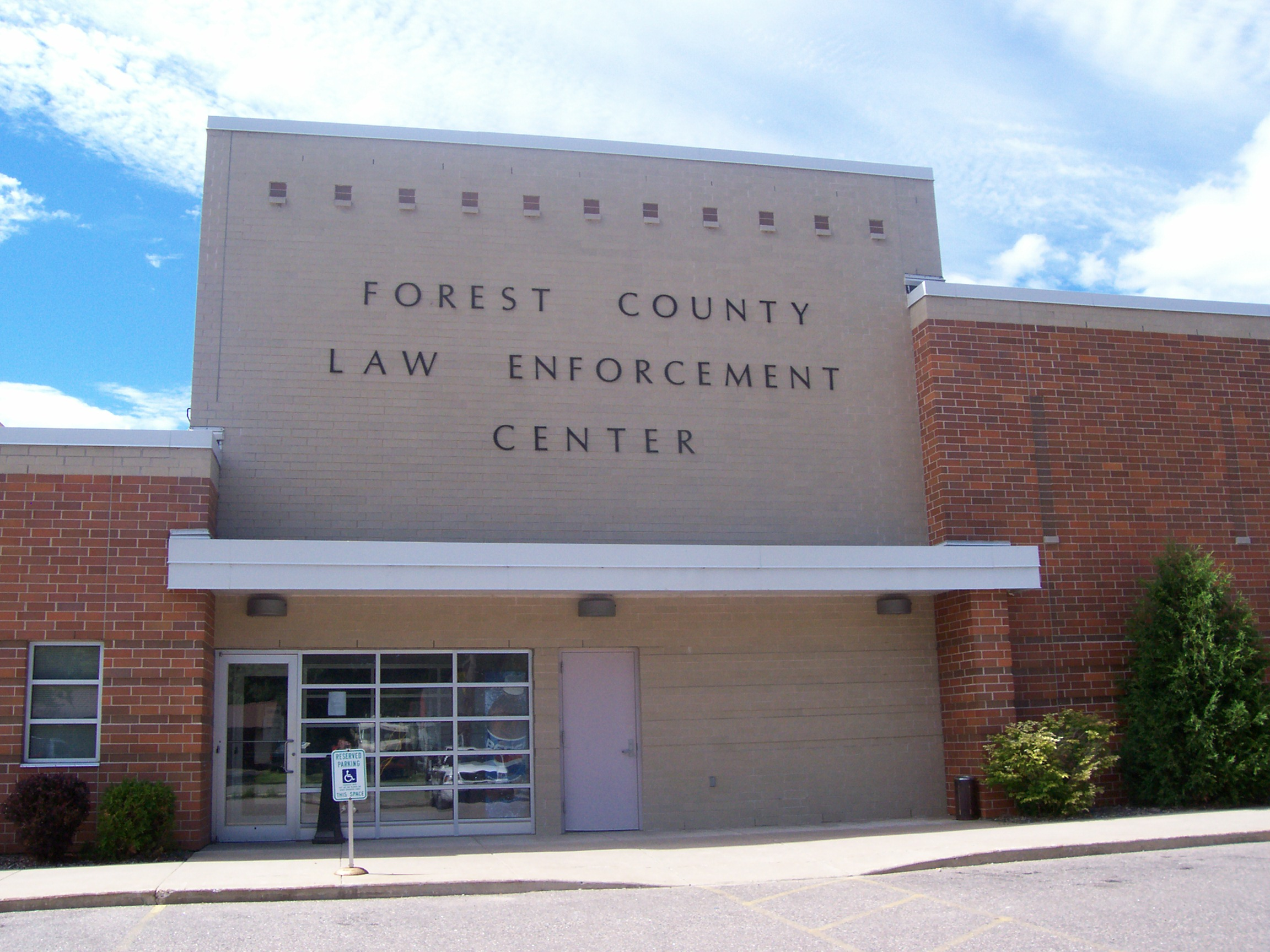
Law Enforcement Center

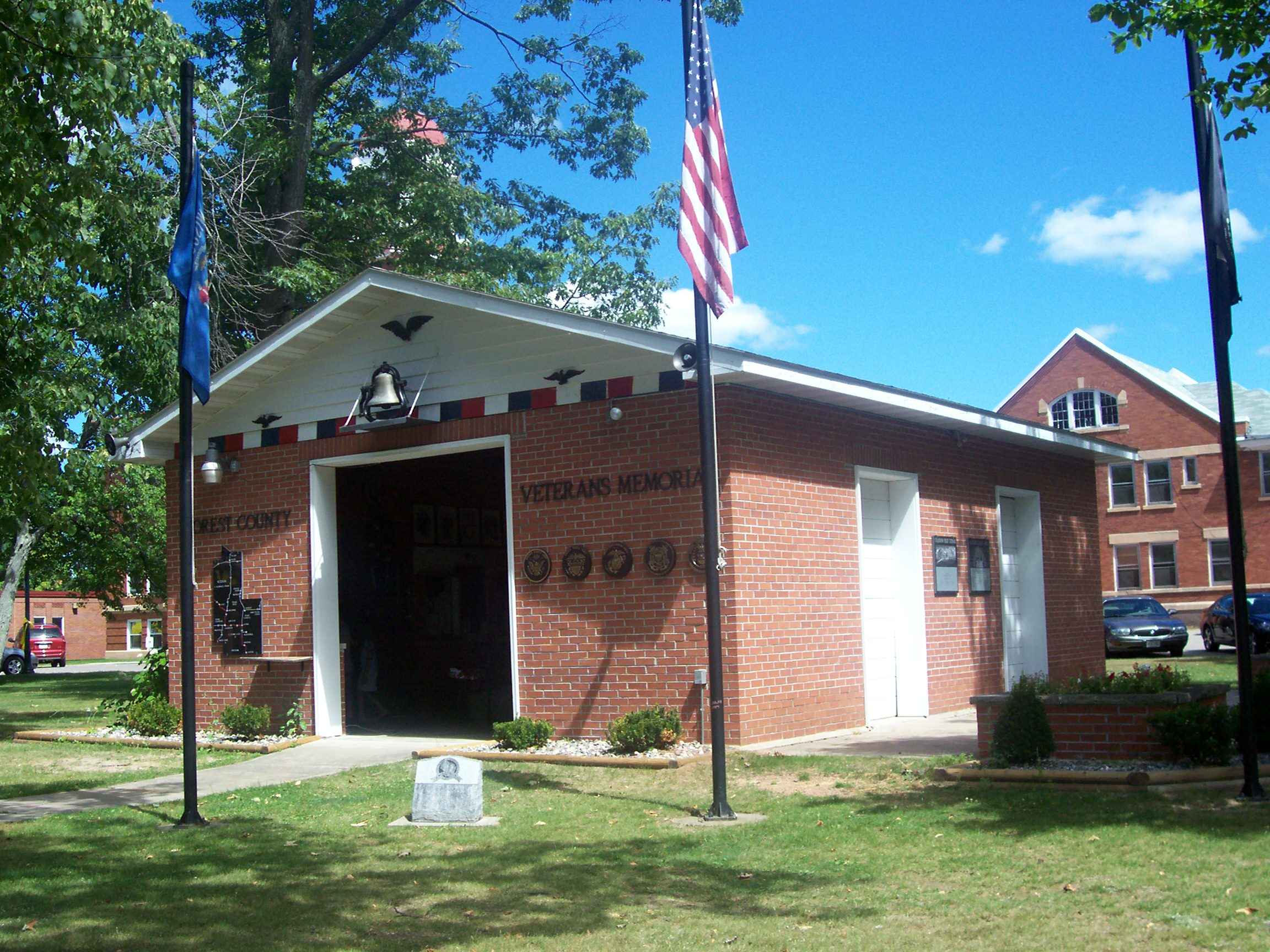
Forest County Veterans Memorial

== Politics ==
United States presidential election results for Forest County, Wisconsin
| Year | Republican | | Democratic | | Third party(ies) | |
| Year | No. | % | No. | % | No. | % |
|---|---|---|---|---|---|---|
| 1892 | 223 | 47.35% | 228 | 48.41% | 20 | 4.25% |
| 1896 | 406 | 68.01% | 172 | 28.81% | 19 | 3.18% |
| 1900 | 378 | 76.83% | 95 | 19.31% | 19 | 3.86% |
| 1904 | 991 | 82.51% | 160 | 13.32% | 50 | 4.16% |
| 1908 | 1,023 | 71.69% | 324 | 22.70% | 80 | 5.61% |
| 1912 | 518 | 38.37% | 567 | 42.00% | 265 | 19.63% |
| 1916 | 738 | 52.19% | 637 | 45.05% | 39 | 2.76% |
| 1920 | 1,429 | 75.13% | 379 | 19.93% | 94 | 4.94% |
| 1924 | 1,104 | 40.74% | 299 | 11.03% | 1,307 | 48.23% |
| 1928 | 1,918 | 52.82% | 1,677 | 46.19% | 36 | 0.99% |
| 1932 | 768 | 22.50% | 2,595 | 76.03% | 50 | 1.46% |
| 1936 | 1,334 | 29.42% | 3,092 | 68.18% | 109 | 2.40% |
| 1940 | 1,672 | 36.04% | 2,951 | 63.61% | 16 | 0.34% |
| 1944 | 1,391 | 36.22% | 2,436 | 63.44% | 13 | 0.34% |
| 1948 | 1,251 | 35.11% | 2,208 | 61.97% | 104 | 2.92% |
| 1952 | 1,990 | 52.47% | 1,791 | 47.22% | 12 | 0.32% |
| 1956 | 2,039 | 57.03% | 1,527 | 42.71% | 9 | 0.25% |
| 1960 | 1,653 | 47.04% | 1,851 | 52.68% | 10 | 0.28% |
| 1964 | 1,069 | 30.10% | 2,479 | 69.79% | 4 | 0.11% |
| 1968 | 1,264 | 40.14% | 1,470 | 46.68% | 415 | 13.18% |
| 1972 | 1,856 | 49.77% | 1,678 | 45.00% | 195 | 5.23% |
| 1976 | 1,604 | 37.84% | 2,574 | 60.72% | 61 | 1.44% |
| 1980 | 2,070 | 44.29% | 2,402 | 51.39% | 202 | 4.32% |
| 1984 | 2,296 | 50.53% | 2,214 | 48.72% | 34 | 0.75% |
| 1988 | 1,845 | 46.02% | 2,142 | 53.43% | 22 | 0.55% |
| 1992 | 1,393 | 31.89% | 1,904 | 43.59% | 1,071 | 24.52% |
| 1996 | 1,166 | 29.41% | 2,092 | 52.76% | 707 | 17.83% |
| 2000 | 2,404 | 50.98% | 2,158 | 45.76% | 154 | 3.27% |
| 2004 | 2,608 | 50.61% | 2,509 | 48.69% | 36 | 0.70% |
| 2008 | 1,963 | 41.92% | 2,673 | 57.08% | 47 | 1.00% |
| 2012 | 2,172 | 46.73% | 2,425 | 52.17% | 51 | 1.10% |
| 2016 | 2,787 | 61.32% | 1,579 | 34.74% | 179 | 3.94% |
| 2020 | 3,285 | 65.01% | 1,721 | 34.06% | 47 | 0.93% |
| 2024 | 3,382 | 66.35% | 1,681 | 32.98% | 34 | 0.67% |

From its founding in 1885 until 1928, Forest County voted for the Republican candidate in all but three elections, voting for the Democratic candidate in 1892 and 1912, and voting for Progressive candidate and native Wisconsinite Robert M. La Follette in 1924. Then, from 1932 to 1996, the county voted Democratic in every election with the exception of four nationwide Republican landslides in 1952, 1956, 1972, and 1984. In 2000 and 2004, Forest County backed George W. Bush in both of his successful runs for the presidency, though doing so by less than 6% both times. The county shifted back to Democratic hands in 2008 and 2012, with Barack Obama taking the county in his two successful elections. However, since 2016, Forest County has shifted significantly to the right. In 2016, Donald Trump received over 61% of the vote in the county, the highest any candidate has received since 1964, winning by over 26% against Hillary Clinton. Trump further improved on his numbers in 2020, taking over 65% of the county's vote and winning by a margin of over 30% against Joe Biden. Trump yet again improved in the county in 2024, with more than 66% of the county's voters supporting him and more than doubling the support of Kamala Harris, turning in the best performance by a Republican in Forest County since Warren G. Harding more than a century earlier.

== See also ==
- National Register of Historic Places listings in Forest County, Wisconsin
