= List of nature centers in Wisconsin =

Wisconsin Nature Centers (Hover mouse over pog to popup clickable link)

This is a list of nature centers and environmental education centers in the state of Wisconsin.

Name	Location	County	Region	Summary
Aldo Leopold Nature Center	Monona	Dane	Southern Savanna	21 acre main site, exhibits on renewable energy, climate science, sustainability, naturalist Aldo Leopold, phenology, weather
Barkhausen Waterfowl Preserve	Suamico	Brown	Lake Michigan	Operated by the county, 920 acres of forest, meadows and wetlands, West Shores Interpretive Center
Bay Beach Wildlife Sanctuary	Green Bay	Brown	Lake Michigan	700 acre urban wildlife refuge
Beaver Creek Reserve	Fall Creek	Eau Claire	Mississippi/Chippewa Rivers	Over 400 acres, includes the Wise Nature Center, citizen science center, butterfly house, observatory, youth camp, obstacle course, field research station, and charter science school
Bethel Horizons Nature Center	Dodgeville	Iowa	Southern Savanna	Located on over 548 acres bordering Governor Dodge State Park, operated by the Evangelical Lutheran Church in America
Blue Mound State Park	Blue Mounds	Dane	Southern Savanna	1,153 acres (467 ha)
Brillion Nature Center	Brillion	Calumet	Central Sands Prairie	Located on 40 acres within the 4,800 acre Brillion Wildlife Area
Cable Natural History Museum	Cable	Bayfield	Lake Superior Northwoods	website, museum operates 2 nearby properties
Camp Five Museum	Laona	Forest	Lake Superior Northwoods	4 acres, includes a logging and forestry museum, historic logging equipment and riverboats, a petting zoo and a nature center with animal, plant and geology displays
Central Wisconsin Environmental Station	Amherst Junction	Portage	Central Sands Prairie	200-acre teaching and learning center about the environment, operated by the University of Wisconsin-Stevens Point College of Natural Resources
Chippewa Moraine State Recreation Area	New Auburn	Chippewa	Mississippi/Chippewa Rivers	3,063 acres, exhibits about the area's geology, natural and cultural history
Cook-Albert Fuller Nature Center at The Ridges Sanctuary	Baileys Harbor	Door	Lake Michigan	1600 acre preserve
Crossroads at Big Creek	Sturgeon Bay	Door	Lake Michigan	125-acre preserve, features indoor and outdoor laboratories, a greenhouse, a specialized botanical and environmental library, an observatory and astronomy center, a historical center developed and maintained by the Door County Historical Society, offers experience-based programs in science, history and the environment for learners of all ages
Devil's Lake State Park Nature Center	Baraboo	Sauk	Southern Savanna	9,217 acres, known for its 500-foot-high (150 m) quartzite bluffs along the 360-acre (150 ha) Devil's Lake, exhibits on park's geology and natural history
Fallen Timbers Environmental Center	Black Creek	Outagamie	Central Sands Prairie	456 acres, owned by six area school districts and operated by CESA 6, hands-on learning for students
Gitche Gumee Nature Center in Pattison State Park	Superior	Douglas	Lake Superior Northwoods	1,225 acres, exhibits about the park's cultural and natural history
Gordon Bubolz Nature Preserve	Appleton	Outagamie	Central Sands Prairie	775 acres, 8.5 miles of trails, environmental center
Havenwoods State Forest	Milwaukee	Milwaukee	Lake Michigan	237 acres, includes Environmental Awareness Center, urban arboretum, trails, education garden
Hawthorn Glen	Milwaukee	Milwaukee	Lake Michigan	23-acre nature center, features nature museum, live native animals, operated by the City
Hawthorn Hollow	Somers	Kenosha	Lake Michigan	40 acre nature sanctuary and arboretum, owned and operated by the Hyslop Foundation
Heckrodt Wetland Reserve	Menasha	Winnebago	Central Sands Prairie	76 acre urban nature reserve
High Cliff State Park	Sherwood	Calumet	Central Sands Prairie	1,187 acres, located on Lake Winnebago, seasonal General Store Museum and nature programs
Horicon National Wildlife Refuge	Mayville	Dodge	Southern Savanna	Over 21,000 acres, features the Horicon Marsh International Education Center
House In The Wood	Delavan	Walworth	Southeast Glacial Plains	Outdoor education and retreat center, features live animals, 23 acres of lakeshore, forest, prairie and marsh habitats
Hunt Hill Audubon Sanctuary	Sarona	Washburn	Lake Superior Northwoods	400 acres of forests, meadow, bogs and glacial lakes
International Crane Foundation	Baraboo	Sauk	Southern Savanna	Live crane exhibits, an interactive education center, guided and self-guided tours, a research library, visitor center, over four miles of hiking trails set among 100 acres of restored tall grass prairie, oak savanna, and wetlands
Interstate Park Ice Age Interpretive Center	Saint Croix Falls	Polk	Lake Superior Northwoods	Wisconsin park is 1,330 acres (538 ha) and the Minnesota park is 298 acres
Jordan Park Nature Center	Stevens Point	Portage	Central Sands Prairie	271 acres, operated by the County
Kemp Natural Resources Station	Woodruff	Oneida	Lake Superior Northwoods	235 acres, research and teaching facility operated by the College of Agricultural and Life Sciences of the University of Wisconsin at Madison
Kettle Moraine State Forest	Campbellsport	Fond du Lac	Central Sands Prairie	Henry S. Reuss Ice Age Visitor Center located in the Northern Unit, exhibits to learn about the frozen history of Wisconsin and the effects of the glacier
Kickapoo Valley Reserve	La Farge	Vernon	Mississippi/Chippewa Rivers	8,569 acres, trails, visitor center with exhibit gallery, environmental education classes
Lac Lawrann Conservancy	West Bend	Washington	Southern Savanna Region	137-acre nature preserve, outdoor education programs, plans for learning center
Ledge View Nature Center	Chilton	Calumet	Central Sands Prairie	105 acres, operated by the County
MacKenzie Center	Poynette	Columbia	Southern Savanna	250 acres, includes logging and conservation museums, native Wisconsin wildlife, an observation tower and an arboretum
Marsh Haven Nature Center	Waupun	Dodge	Southern Savanna	46 acres, located at the north end of Horicon Marsh
Maywood	Sheboygan	Sheboygan	Lake Michigan	135 acre city-owned park with an arboretum, ecology center
Mead Wildlife Area	Milladore	Wood	Central Sands Prairie	Education programs at the Stanton W. Mead Education and Visitor Center
Mequon Nature Preserve	Mequon	Ozaukee	Lake Michigan	438 acres with over five miles of trails, an observation tower, and the PieperPower Education Center
Mosquito Hill Nature Center	New London	Outagamie	Central Sands Prairie	Operated by the county on 430 acres
Navarino Nature Center	Shiocton	Outagamie	Central Sands Prairie	Environmental education facility located within the 1,000 acre Wisconsin Department of Natural Resources Navarino Wildlife Area
Necedah National Wildlife Refuge	Necedah	Juneau	Central Sands Prairie	43,696-acre refuge, habitat for waterfowl and sandhill cranes, visitor center exhibits, programs
Neustadter Nature Center at Collins Marsh	Collins	Manitowoc	Lake Michigan	4,200 acre state wildlife area, facilities include a nature center open by appointment, a screened-in shelter and 110 foot tower
Norskedalen Nature and Heritage Center	Coon Valley	Vernon	Mississippi/Chippewa Rivers	400 acres, includes preserved original late 19th century log and stone buildings, artifacts brought with the settlers from Norway, Native American artifacts, a hands-on nature room, an arboretum, and the Skumsrud Heritage Farm
Northern Highland-American Legion State Forest	Sayner	Vilas	Lake Superior Northwoods	Crystal Lake Nature Center at Crystal Lake Campground, over 232,000 acres
North Lakeland Discovery Center	Manitowish	Vilas	Lake Superior Northwoods	Includes 12 miles of trails
Northwoods Wildlife Center	Minocqua	Oneida	Lake Superior Northwoods	Wildlife rehabilitation center with resident animals, guided tours and education programs
Point Beach State Forest	Two Rivers	Manitowoc	Lake Michigan	Open weekday afternoons from Memorial Day through Labor Day
Pringle Nature Center	Bristol	Kenosha	Lake Michigan	Located within the 197 acre Bristol Woods County Park
Raptor Education Group	Antigo	Langlade	Lake Superior Northwoods	Tours available in the summer of the raptor rehabilitation area
Retzer Nature Center	Waukesha	Waukesha	Southern Savanna	335 acres, operated by the County
Richard Bong State Recreation Area	Kansasville	Racine	Lake Michigan	Molinaro Visitor Center features displays, live animals and hands-on exhibits about the recreation area
River Bend Nature Center	Racine	Racine	Lake Michigan	743 acres
Riveredge Nature Center	Saukville	Ozaukee	Lake Michigan	485 acres of prairies, forests, ponds and marshes along the Milwaukee River
Sanderling Nature Center at Kohler-Andrae State Park	Sheboygan	Sheboygan	Lake Michigan	988 acres
Schlitz Audubon Nature Center	Milwaukee	Milwaukee	Lake Michigan	185 acres along the shore of Lake Michigan
Schmeeckle Reserve	Stevens Point	Portage	Central Sands Prairie	275 acres, located on the University of Wisconsin–Stevens Point
Seno Woodland Education Center	Burlington	Kenosha	Lake Michigan	Operated by the Kenosha/Racine Land Trust, education for schools, educators, landowners about forestry and the national habitats of forest, prairie and wetland
Thousand Islands Environmental Center	Kaukauna	Outagamie	Central Sands Prairie	350 acres
Treehaven	Tomahawk	Lincoln	Lake Superior Northwoods	Residential natural resources education and conference facility owned and operated by the University of Wisconsin-Stevens Point, College of Natural Resources
Trees for Tomorrow	Eagle River	Vilas	Lake Superior Northwoods	Natural resources specialty school, programs for families, schools, groups, teachers, adults
University of Wisconsin–Madison Arboretum	Madison	Dane	Southern Savanna	1,260 acres, visitor center exhibits, public and education programs
Upham Woods Outdoor Learning Center	Wisconsin Dells	Juneau	Central Sands Prairie	310 acres, public and residential environmental education center, operated by the University of Wisconsin-Extension, 14 buildings including a nature center and a raptor enclosure housing educational birds of prey
Urban Ecology Center	Milwaukee	Milwaukee	Lake Michigan	Cares for 70 acres of urban land, offers environmental education and citizen science programs
Washington Island Art & Nature Center	Washington Island	Door	Lake Michigan	Art gallery, exhibits on island natural and cultural history
Wehr Nature Center	Franklin	Milwaukee	Lake Michigan	Operated by the county, located within 200 acre Whitnall Park
Welty Environmental Center	Beloit	Rock	Southern Savanna	Located in Beckman Mill County Park
White Cedar Nature Center in Peninsula State Park	Fish Creek	Door	Lake Michigan	3,776 acres
Whitefish Dunes State Park Nature Center	Sturgeon Bay	Door	Lake Michigan	865 acres, exhibits about the ecology, geology and cultural history of the park
Wildwood Wildlife Park	Minocqua	Oneida	Lake Superior Northwoods	Zoo and nature center with over 750 animals
Willow River State Park	Hudson	St. Croix	Mississippi/Chippewa Rivers	2,891 acres, includes Willow River Nature Center
Woodland Dunes Nature Center and Preserve	Two Rivers	Manitowoc	Lake Michigan	Nearly 1,400-acre preserve

== Defunct centers ==
- Myrick Hixon EcoPark, La Crosse, closed in 2014
