= Laona (CDP), Wisconsin =

Laona, Wisconsin
- Census-designated place
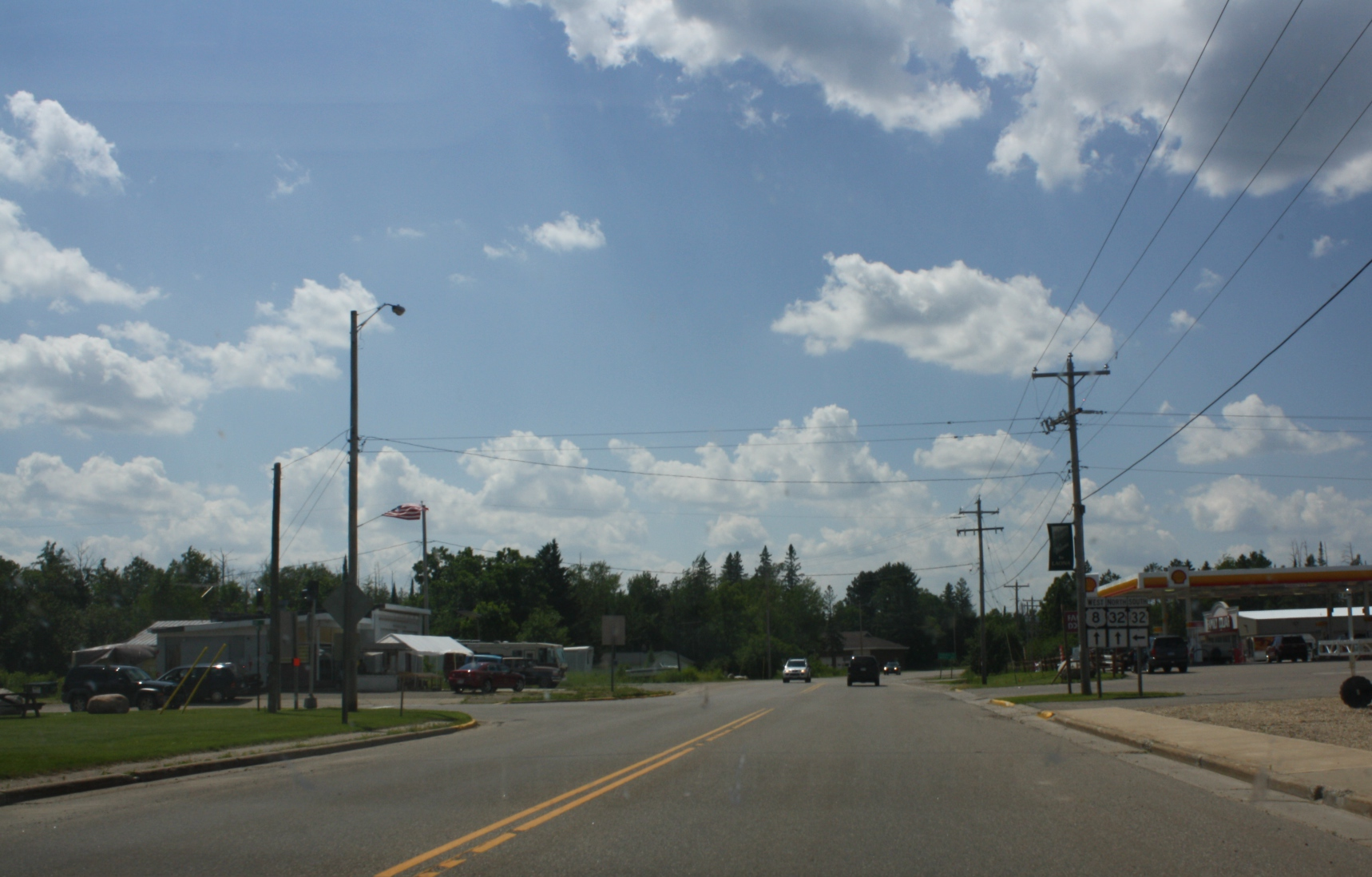
- Looking west in downtown Laona

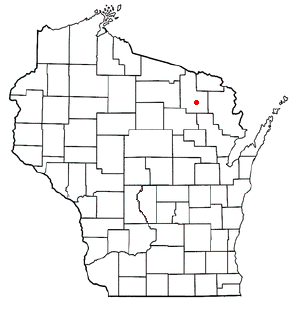
- Location of Laona, Wisconsin
- Coordinates: 45°33′26″N 88°41′18″W
- Country: United States
- State: Wisconsin
- County: Forest

Government
  - Type: unincorporated

Area
  - Total: 1.948 sq mi (5.05 km^{2})
  - Land: 1.948 sq mi (5.05 km^{2})
  - Water: 0 sq mi (0 km^{2})
- Elevation: 1,572 ft (479 m)

Population (2020)
  - Total: 519
  - Density: 266/sq mi (103/km^{2})
- Time zone: UTC-6 (Central (CST))
  - Summer (DST): UTC-5 (CDT)
- Area codes: 715 & 534
- FIPS code: 55-42500
- GNIS feature ID: 1583528

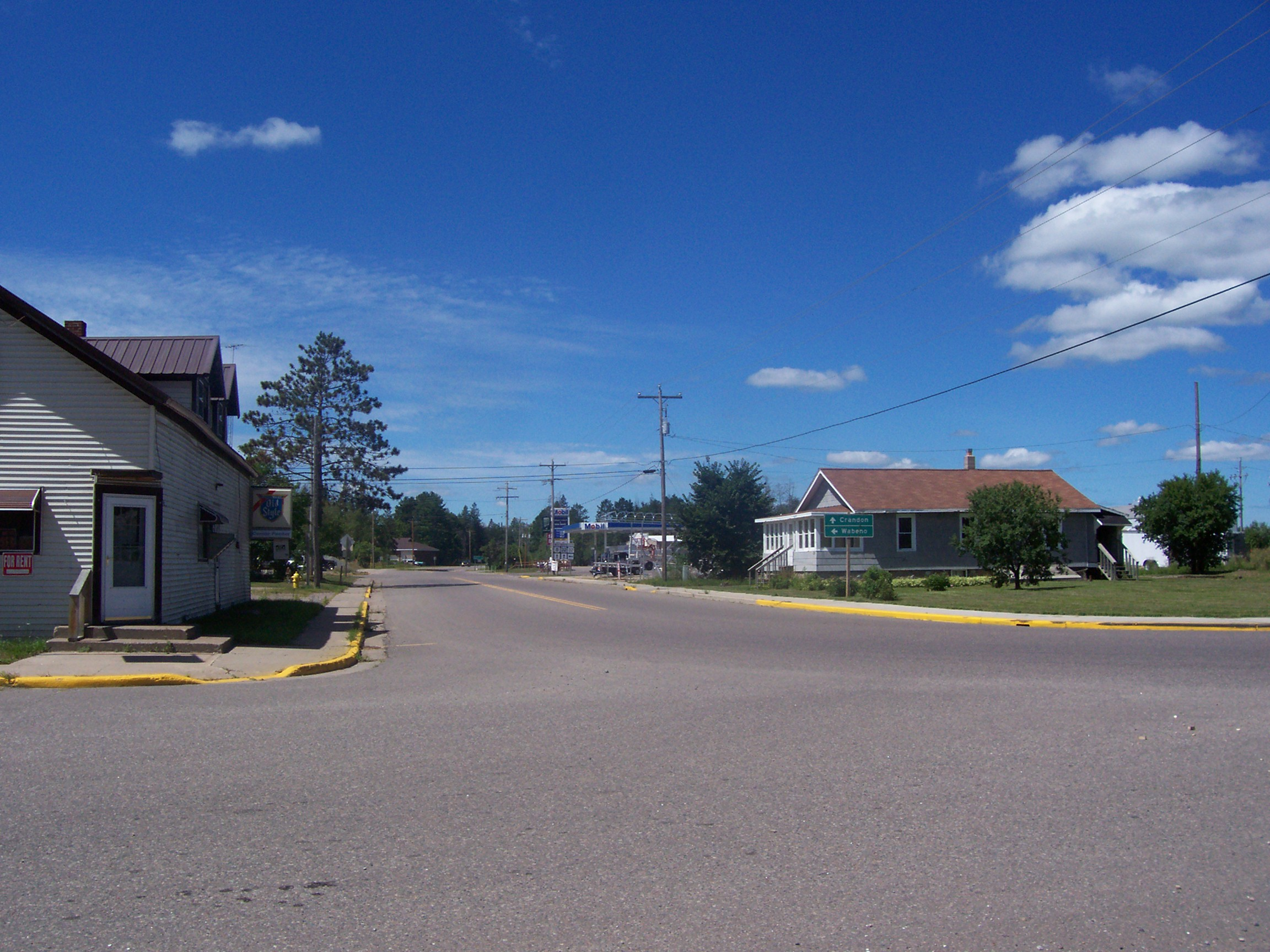
Downtown Laona

Laona is an unincorporated census-designated place in the town of Laona in Forest County, Wisconsin, United States. U.S. Route 8 travels east–west through the community and Wisconsin Highway 32 travels south and west of the community. The community park has a sign stating that the community donated the 1979 Christmas tree at the nation's capitol. As of the 2020 census, its population is 519, down from 583 at the 2010 census.

== History ==
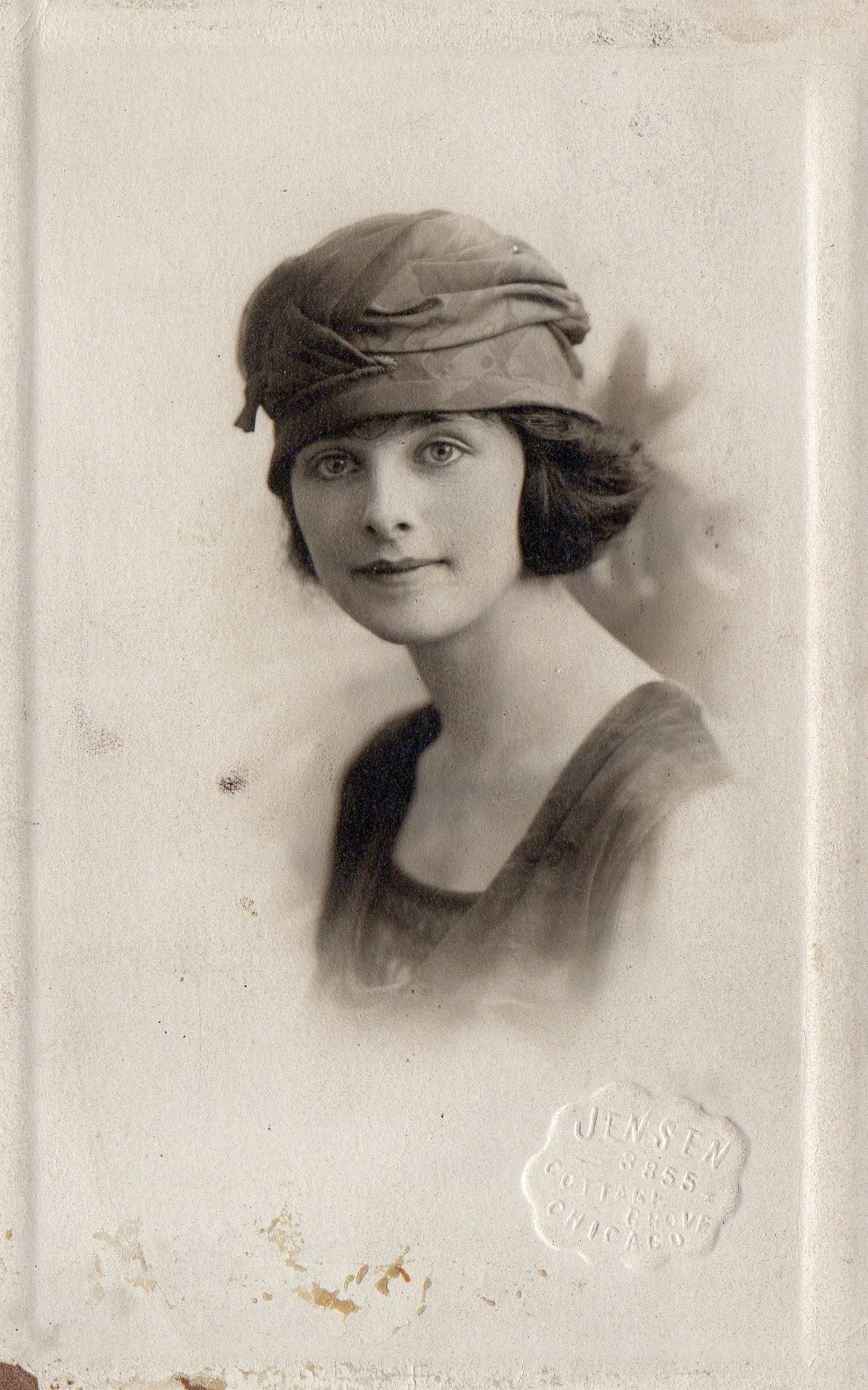
Laona Johnson was the namesake of Laona, WI

The town was established in 1903, although settlement had begun in 1896 by William D. Connor, a lumberman and President of his R. Connor Lumber and Land Company. The community was named for the daughter of Norman Johnson, an early resident; the first child born to a settler.

In 1896, W.D. Connor backpacked sixty miles from Gillett, Wisconsin, to explore the region along a proposed Chicago and North Western Railway route. Living off the abundant fish and game, he found several potential sites for mills and towns. The first was to become Wabeno, Wisconsin, the second was to become Laona. Connor ultimately purchased over 100,000 acres (400 km^{2}) surrounding Laona.

The Laona area was a Potowatomi and Chippewa domicile. It was the location of early summer annual porcupine hunts, attracting Indians from all over Northern Wisconsin and Upper Michigan for days of killing and cooking porcupines and nights of feasting and dancing. There were also annual fall wild rice harvest festivals. Along what is now Laona's central street had been a long brush fence with spaced intervals. This was a deer hunting range, behind which Indians had lain in wait with bows, awaiting deer drives.

A classic company town, Laona's mill, bank, hospital, store, school, library, and housing were all built by the Connor company. The town's economy revolved around the company's lumber mill. During business downturns of the 19th and early 20th century, "company scrip" or privately issued company money was issued and used as currency in the town.

Laona remains a foundation of Wisconsin's lumber history. The private forestland surrounding the town has been selectively managed for the past 100 years and the forest is an example of sustainable management.

== Recreation ==
The community is the site of the Lumberjack Steam Train, an operating turn-of-the-century passenger train and award-winning museum. This operates during the summer months.

In the winter, Laona is home to the 100 Mile Snow Safari or "100 miler", one of Wisconsin's oldest snowmobiling trails. It offers nearly 100 miles (160 km) of undeveloped trail riding in a managed trail system. With dozens of undeveloped lakes and miles of undeveloped timberland to ride through, it is one of Wisconsin's most popular snowmobiling trails.

== Images ==
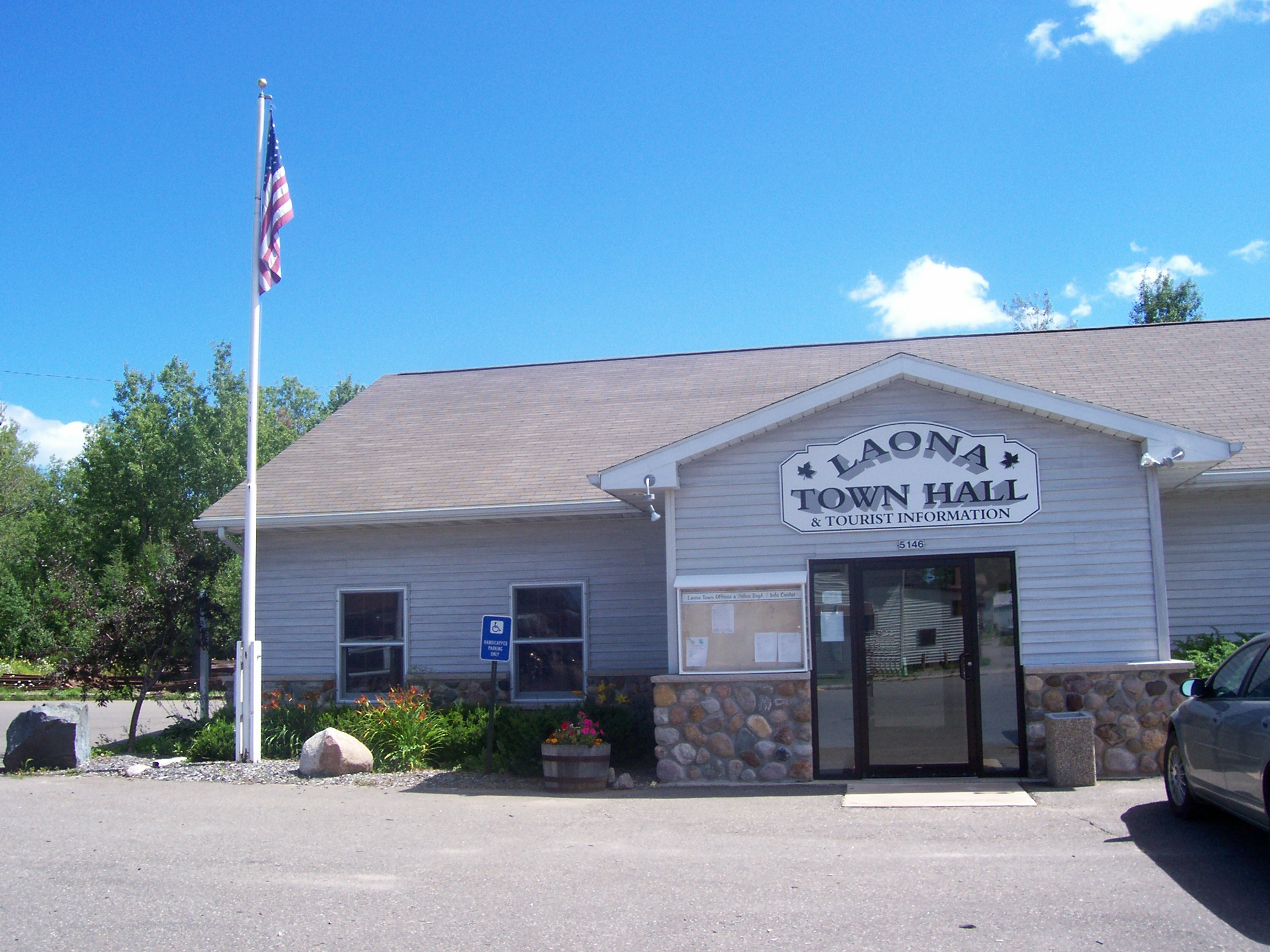
Town's hall in the unincorporated community

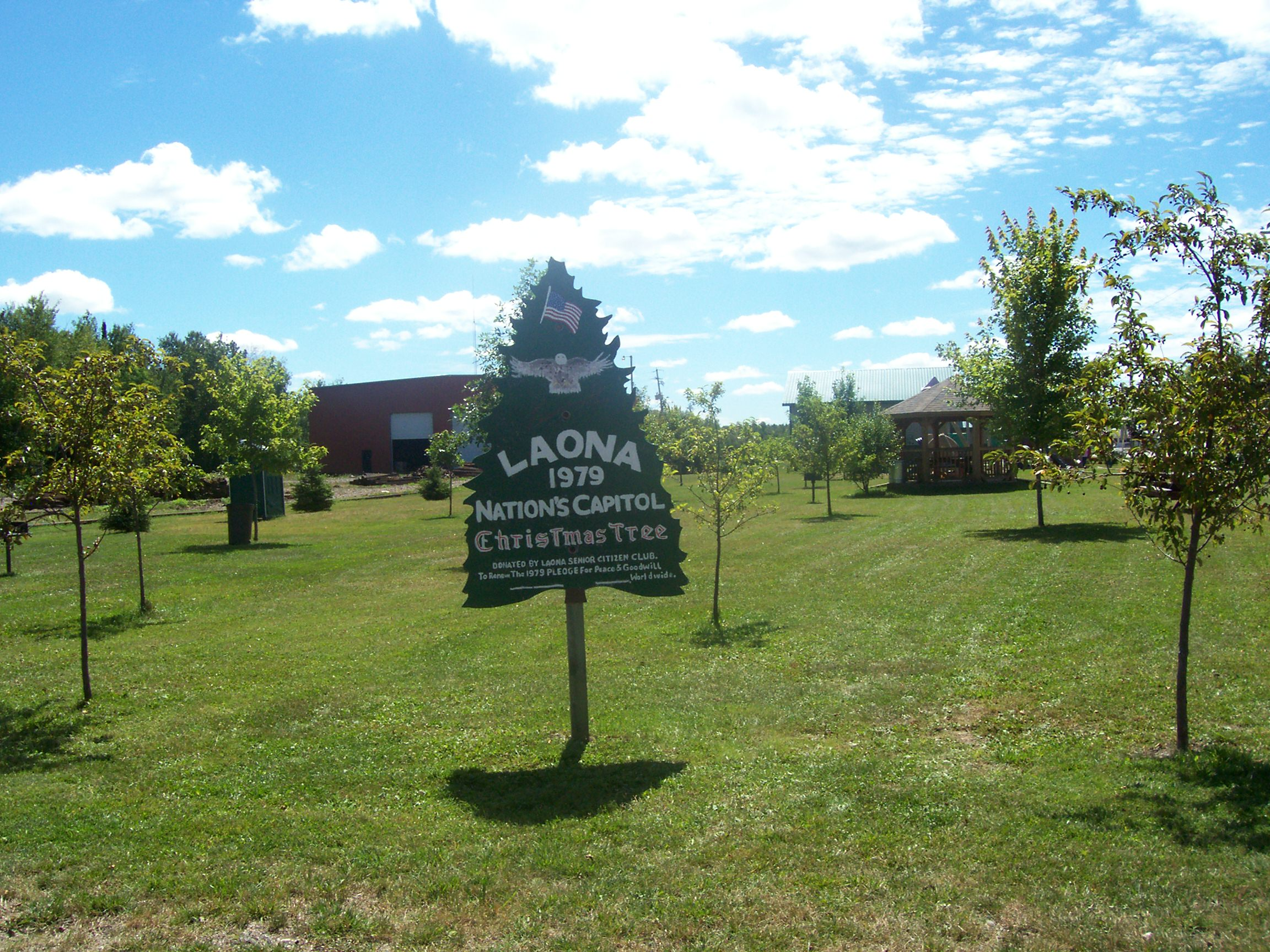
Community park

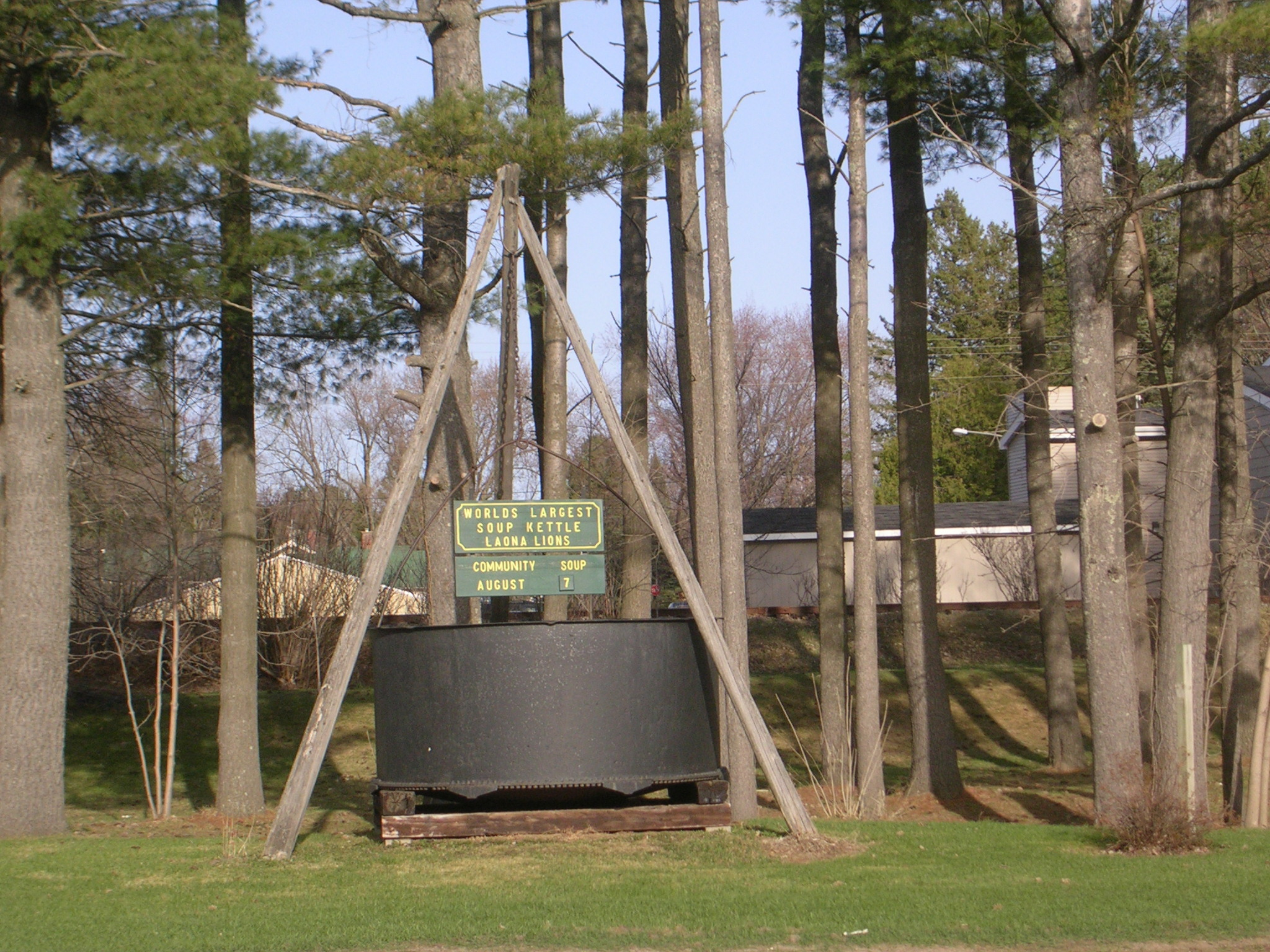
"World's Largest Soup Kettle" in Laona

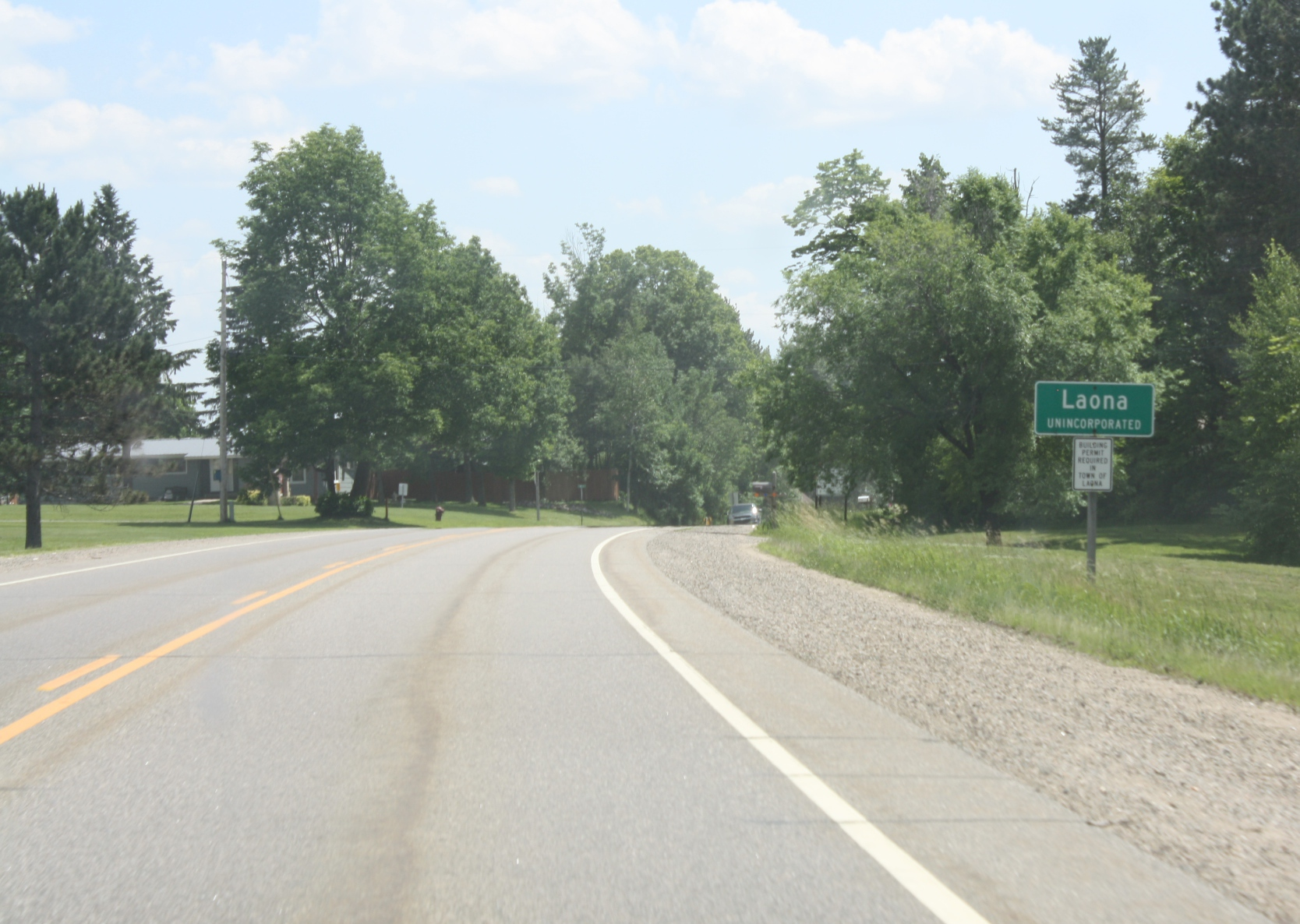
Sign on US8

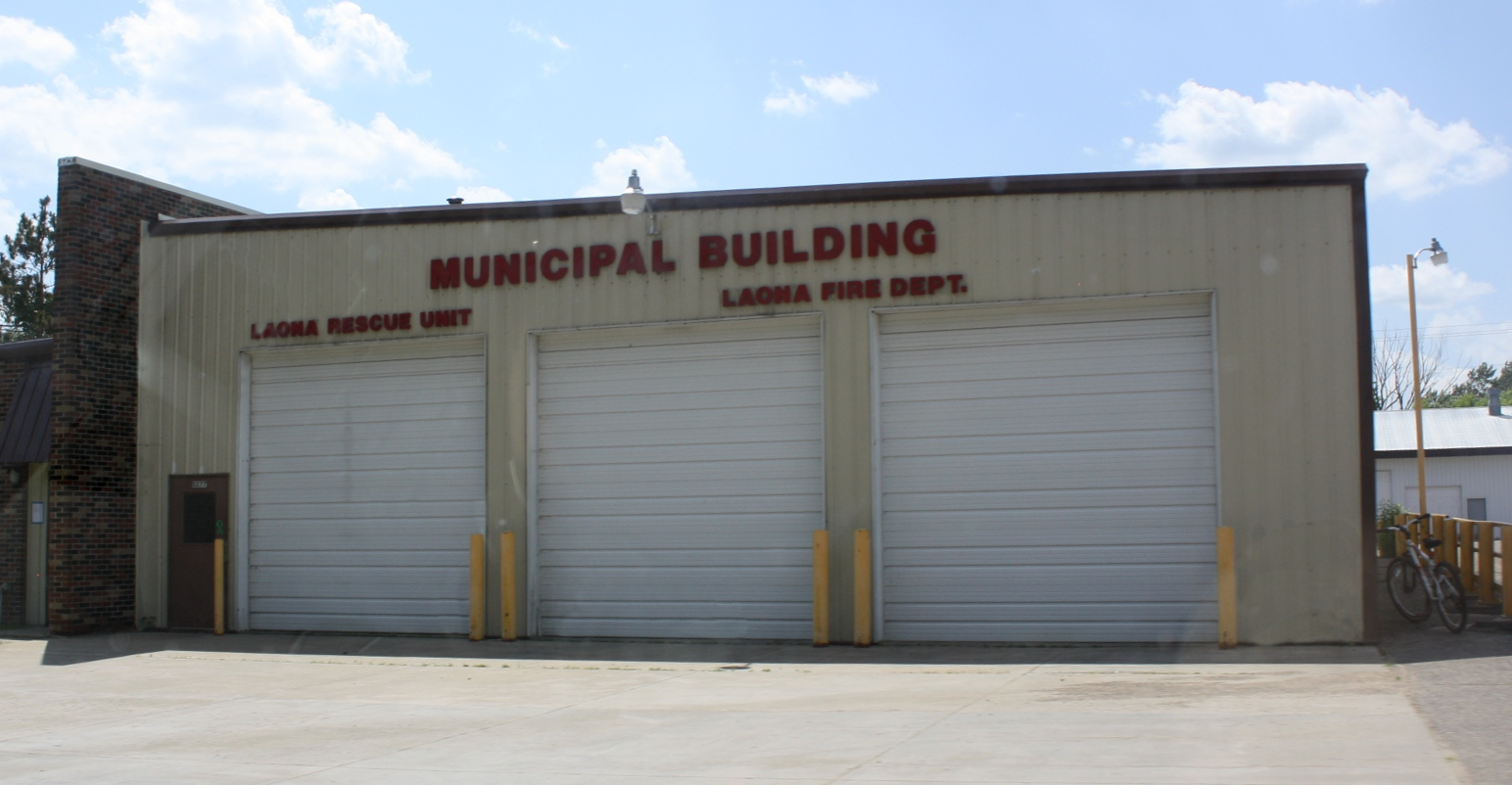
Municipal building
