= Camp Five =

Camp Five may refer to:

- Camp Five, former name of Elinor, California
- Camp Five Museum
- Camp five (Guantanamo)
