= Wildlife Rescue Association of BC =

Canadian wildlife rehabilitation centre

- Abbreviation: WRA
- Formation: 1979
- Founded at: 5216 Glencarin Drive, Burnaby, British Columbia, Canada
- Type: Charitable organization
- Registration no.: 131373490RR0001
- Legal status: Charity
- Purpose: Animal rescue, rehabilitation, welfare, education
- Region served: British Columbia, Canada
- Services: Rescue, treatment and rehabilitation of injured, orphaned or pollution-damaged wildlife; public education including school and community groups; advice and guidance to the public on wildlife issues in person and through the wildlife helpline.
- Co-executive director: Coleen Doucette
- Co-executive director: Linda Bakker
- Revenue: $1,689,680 (2021)
- Expenses: $1,370,095 (2021)
- Staff: 16 full-time, 45 part-time
- Website: WWW.WILDLIFERESCUE.CA

The Wildlife Rescue Association of BC (WRA) is a wildlife rescue and rehabilitation centre based in Burnaby, British Columbia, Canada, that is permitted to care for injured, orphaned, and pollution-damaged wildlife in British Columbia. It is a member of the Wildlife Rehabilitators' Network of British Columbia (WRNBC).

== History ==
The organization was founded in 1979 in response to a growing needs to help wildlife affected by human activity, and to provide education to the public on ways to co-exist with urban wildlife. Originally located at the Nature House on Burnaby Lake, Wildlife Rescue relocated to its current site on Glencarin Drive in 1987. In 1990, Wildlife Rescue hosted the International Wildlife Rehabilitation Council's annual conference, the first international wildlife rehabilitators conference held in Canada. In July 2019, WRA celebrated their 40th anniversary of treating injured birds and animals.

== Activities ==
The Wildlife Rescue Association of BC is dedicated to wildlife rescue, rehabilitation, and release. Every year, the organization aids in mitigating and responding to wildlife emergencies including annual Canada Goose rooftop rescues, and extreme weather events such as heatwaves, flooding, wildfires, and cold snaps.

=== Wildlife hospital ===
Wildlife Rescue's hospital is open 7-days a week, 365-days a year, to care for wildlife in need. Wildlife Technicians, Registered Vet Techs (RVTs), and volunteers work together to provide care to animal patients with the goal of release. Since its opening in 1979, more than 125,000 wild animals have been treated by their hospital, which cares for an average of 5,000 animals every year, primarily birds and bats.

=== Wildlife helpline ===
Wildlife Rescue's Support Centre answers 18,000 helpline calls annually from the public with questions regarding wildlife emergencies. During events such as cold-snaps, phone calls increase dramatically, from members of the public seeking advice on helping wildlife.

=== Education and events ===
Every year, Wildlife Rescue hosts an "Earth Fest" - a community festival to celebrate Earth Day. They provide educational resources through their blog, email campaigns, and social media. Wildlife Rescue also provided education through their weekly television program called Wildlife Weekly, which aired more than 52 episodes on Shaw TV's, The Express.

== Notable rescues ==
- Wildlife Rescue admits a Spotted Bat, an extremely rare species, in October 2021. The bat was found out of range, dehydrated, and lethargic. After a couple of weeks in care, this bat recovered and was released.
- An outbreak of Salmonella poisoning in 2020/2021 wreaked havoc on local Pine Siskin population. Wildlife Rescue urges the public to remove bird feeders to prevent the spread of disease.
- Every year, Wildlife Rescue attends to the rescues of Canada Geese nesting on urban rooftops, as young goslings are unable to make the jump safely from high rooftops.
- Six Great Blue Heron fledglings were rushed to WRA's hospital after the trees their nests were in fell.
- A young albino Crow recovered at WRA after being found dehydrated and emaciated.
- Endangered American White Pelican recovers from fish hook injury.
- Heatwaves and wildfires in the summer of 2017 lead to an influx of wildlife patients dehydrated and lethargic.
- 62 Gulls were rescued from a vat at an East Vancouver tofu processing plant.
- Approximately 500 garter snakes, ranging in length from 10 cm to one metre, were rescued from construction site, cared for in brumation, and released back to nature.
- In April 2015, three Bufflehead ducks were admitted heavily soiled in an oily substance.

== Funding ==
WRA is a not-for-profit charitable society that relies largely on donations from the public and government grants for its funding. WRA receives 80% of its annual funding through donations from the public and corporations.

WRA raises funds by offering symbolic wildlife adoptions through their "Fur & Feathers Adoption Program," which includes an official adoption certificate, a species information card, and a charitable tax receipt. They also promote monthly giving through their Freedom Partners program, and planned (legacy) giving.
