= Laona and Northern Railway =

Railroad in Wisconsin

Coordinates: 45°33′41.4″N 88°40′58.5″W

- Laona and Northern No. 4, 1960s era

Overview
- Headquarters: Laona, Wisconsin
- Reporting mark: LNO
- Locale: Northeastern Wisconsin
- Dates of operation: 1902–present

Technical
- Track gauge: 4 ft 8 1/2 in (1,435 mm) standard gauge
- Length: 8 mi (1902-1983); 1.2 mi (1983-)

The Laona and Northern Railway (reporting marks LNO) is a heritage railroad in Laona, Wisconsin.

== History ==
A former freight railroad, it was incorporated in 1902 for the R. Connor Company of Marshfield, Wisconsin, to haul lumber to its mill in Laona and then transport it to the Soo Line interchange 8 miles north in Laona Junction.

When the railway converted to diesel in the mid-1950s, the company held on to only one steam locomotive, No. 4 or 4 Spot, for reserve power and burning weeds from the rail line. By 1965 the Connor Company used the locomotive for mixed trains to Laona Junction, taking passengers on a 2 1/2-hour ride. In 1983 the Connor Company gave the Laona and Northern No. 4 to the Camp 5 historical society, and it now pulls the Lumberjack Steam Train to the Camp Five Museum.

== Motive Power ==
Laona and Northern Motive Power
Number	Model	Prev owners	Other
2			
3	Vulcan 2-6-2		
4	Vulcan 2-6-2	Fairchild and Northeastern Railroad.	Lumberjack Steam Train
5			
101	Vulcan 45 Ton		Ex-USAX 4554, On display in New London, WI
102	GE 45 Ton		
103	Whitcomb 65 Ton		Ex-USAX 8497, Scrapped 2006

== See also ==
- List of heritage railroads in the United States
