= Soperton (disambiguation) =

Soperton may refer to:

- Soperton, Georgia, a city in Treutlen County
- Soperton, Ontario, a community in the township of Leeds and the Thousand Islands
- Soperton, Wisconsin, an unincorporated community in Forest County
