= Raptor Education Group =

US non-profit organisation

Coordinates: 45°06′13″N 89°06′20″W

A peregrine falcon in the care of REGI

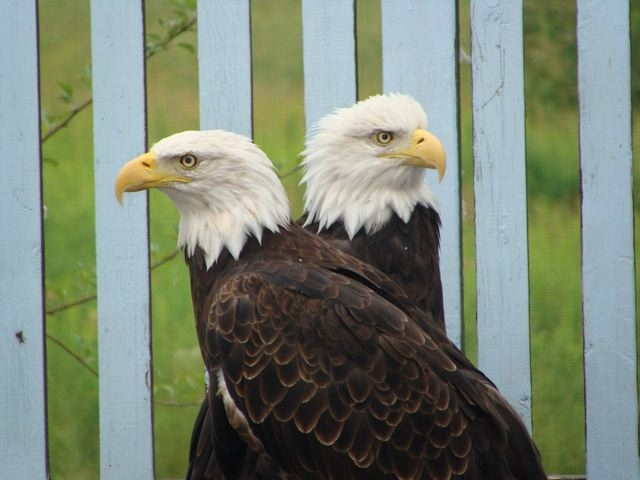
Two bald eagles, one a victim of the Exxon Valdez spill, at REGI

A recovering barred owl

Raptor Education Group, Inc (REGI) is a 501(c)(3) non-profit organization in Antigo, Wisconsin, United States, dedicated to caring for injured or orphaned avian wildlife. It works with and temporarily cares for birds from endangered or threatened species "for rehabilitation and educational purposes."

REGI is a member of the International Wildlife Rehabilitation Council, National Wildlife Rehabilitators Association, Raptor Research Foundation, and American Ornithological Society.

== History and work ==
REGI was founded in 1990 by Marjorie and Don Gibson. Marge Gibson is a past president of the International Wildlife Rehabilitation Council. The stated goals of REGI are:

- To create a safe haven for injured wildlife while they heal and until they are ready to be released back into the wild.
- To develop nutritional protocol, rehabilitation methods and husbandry based on the natural history of the bird to assure a successful release.
- To create a broader understanding of native birds, their behavior and habitat needs among the public and the scientific community.

REGI focuses on helping raptors and swans, but accepts all wild birds. It cares for roughly 600 birds a year, over 150 birds at any one time. REGI has had as many as 13 bald eagles in its care at once, and rehabilitated 14 trumpeter swans with lead poisoning in winter 2009. It regularly cares for owls, bald eagles, and cranes as well, including those injured by hunting and oil spills. It has been recognized for its work by the governor of Wisconsin, and by news agencies across the country. A bald eagle suffering from West Nile virus that was rehabilitated in 2002 has since been instrumental into research into the illness, having been tracked since its release into the wild.

In 2008, the group rehabilitated a sandhill crane with an arrow shot through its torso, work that was noted in the UK Guardian, San Francisco Chronicle and the Wisconsin Journal Sentinel.

=== Educational outreach ===
REGI runs educational outreach programs at its facilities in Antigo, and in classrooms around Wisconsin. Its teachers bring birds they care for to classrooms as part of these programs. During the summer and fall tour season it is open to the public.
