= Wabeno, Wisconsin =

- Town
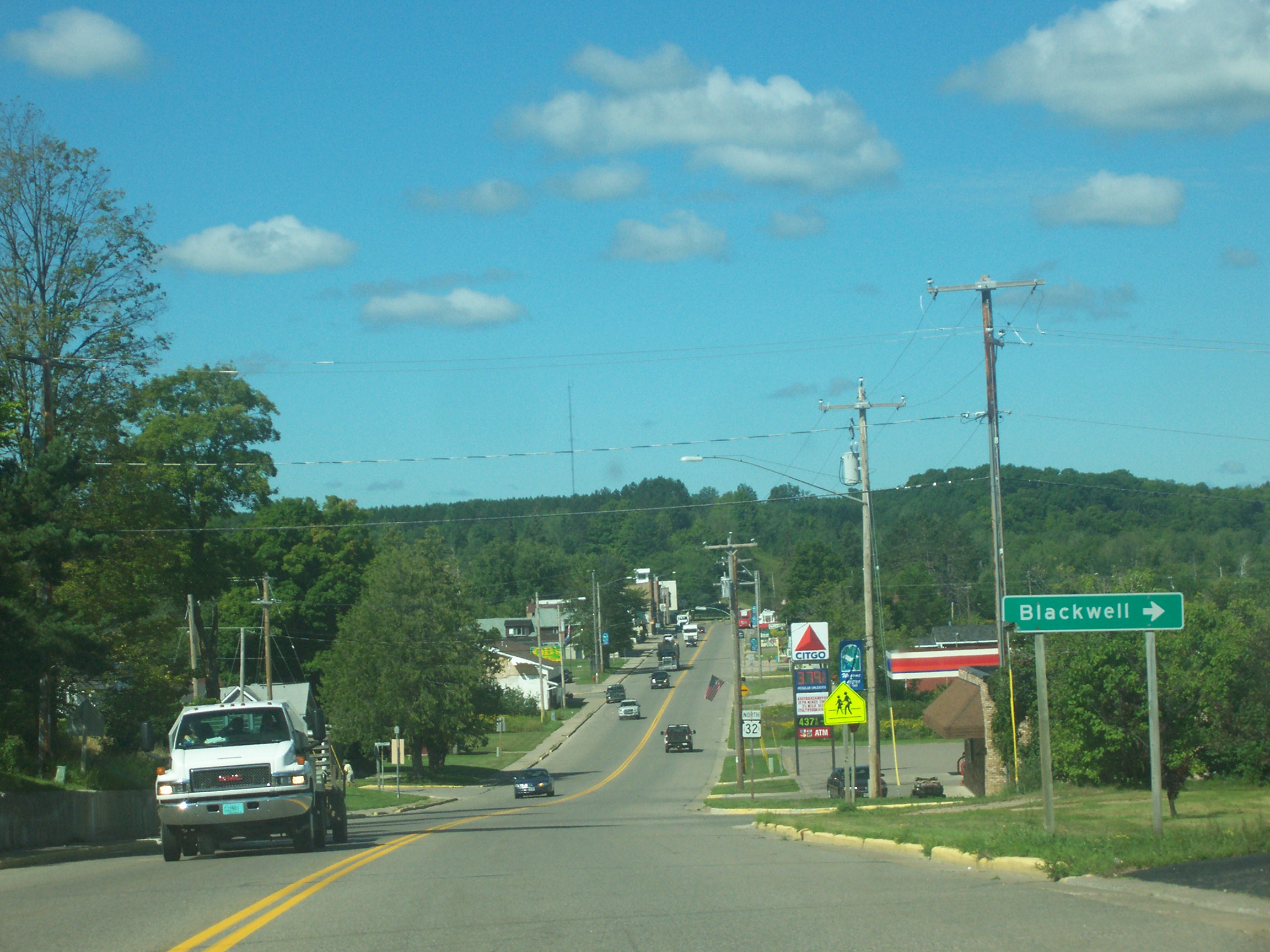
- Looking west at the community of Wabeno skyline on WIS 32

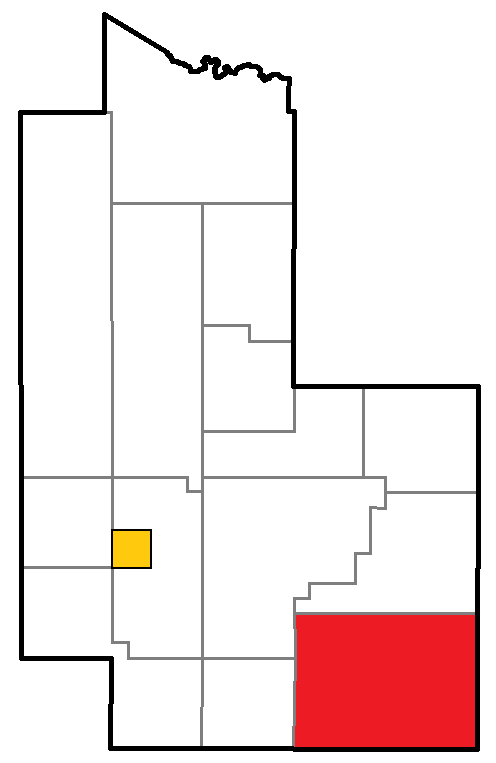
- Location of Wabeno, within Forest County
- Coordinates: 45°26′31″N 88°34′11″W
- Country: United States
- State: Wisconsin
- County: Forest

Area
  - Total: 108.3 sq mi (280.5 km^{2})
  - Land: 107.3 sq mi (278.0 km^{2})
  - Water: 0.97 sq mi (2.5 km^{2})
- Elevation: 1,371 ft (418 m)

Population (2020)
  - Total: 1,074
  - Density: 10.01/sq mi (3.863/km^{2})
- Time zone: UTC-6 (Central (CST))
  - Summer (DST): UTC-5 (CDT)
- Area codes: 715 & 534
- FIPS code: 55-83025
- GNIS feature ID: 1584337
- Website: https://wabeno.org/

Wabeno is a town in Forest County, Wisconsin, United States. The population was 1,074 at the 2020 census. The census-designated place of Wabeno and the unincorporated communities of Carter, Padus, and Soperton are located in the town. Wabeno is situated within Wisconsin's 7th congressional district.

== Geography ==
According to the United States Census Bureau, the town has a total area of 108.3 square miles (280 km^{2}), of which 107.3 square miles (278 km^{2}) is land and 0.9 square miles (2.3 km^{2}), or 0.88%, is water.

== Demographics ==
As of the census of 2000, there were 1,828 people, 497 households, and 341 families residing in the town. The population density was 11.8 people per square mile (4.5/km^{2}). There were 845 housing units at an average density of 7.9 per square mile (3.0/km^{2}). The racial makeup of the town was 74.84% White, 0.32% African American, 20.65% Native American, 0.08% Asian, 0.16% Pacific Islander, 0.47% from other races, and 3.48% from two or more races. Hispanic or Latino of any race were 1.66% of the population.

There were 497 households, out of which 33.6% had children under the age of 18 living with them, 47.9% were married couples living together, 14.3% had a female householder with no husband present, and 31.2% were non-families. 28.0% of all households were made up of individuals, and 13.3% had someone living alone who was 65 years of age or older. The average household size was 2.54 and the average family size was 3.07.

In the town, the population was spread out, with 31.6% under the age of 18, 6.6% from 18 to 24, 26.1% from 25 to 44, 20.9% from 45 to 64, and 14.8% who were 65 years of age or older. The median age was 36 years. For every 100 females, there were 96.0 males. For every 100 females age 18 and over, there were 92.7 males.

The median income for a household in the town was $37,768, and the median income for a family was $42,500. Males had a median income of $27,321 versus $20,583 for females. The per capita income for the town was $16,809. About 10.1% of families and 11.1% of the population were below the poverty line, including 13.8% of those under age 18 and 12.8% of those age 65 or over.

== Buildings and structures ==
- Chicago and North-Western Land Office, now the Wabeno Public Library

== Historic district ==
- Minertown-Oneva, mining district in Carter

== Education ==
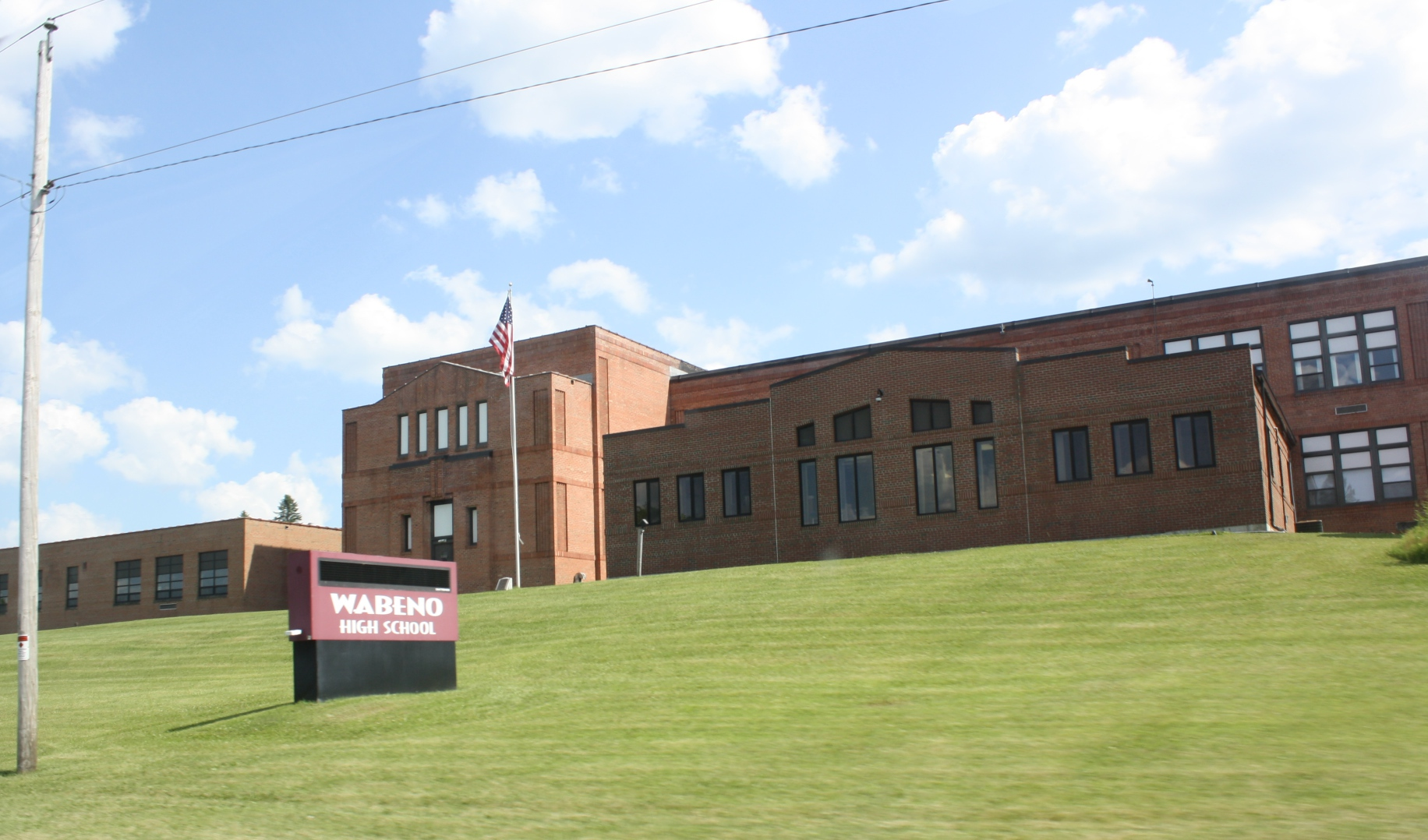
Wabeno High School

The Wabeno Area School District draws students from several area communities, including Lakewood, Townsend, Carter, Blackwell, and Freedom. The district consists of one elementary school and one high school.

The Wabeno school colors are purple and white. Its athletic teams sport the moniker of the Logrollers, and the mascot is Larry the Logroller. Because of low enrollment, Wabeno High School often co-ops programs with nearby Laona High School. These teams employ the nickname Rebels and the colors black and silver. All Rebel and "Roller" teams are members of the Northern Lakes Conference. As of 2013, all sports from Laona High School are combined with those from Wabeno, marking the end of the Laona Kellys.
