= Wayland Becker =

American football player (1910–1984)

No. 21
- Positions: Defensive end, end, punter

Personal information
- Born: November 2, 1910; Soperton, Wisconsin, U.S.
- Died: December 1, 1984 (aged 74); Lena, Wisconsin, U.S.
- Listed height: 6 ft 0 in (1.83 m)
- Listed weight: 198 lb (90 kg)

Career information
- High school: East (Green Bay, Wisconsin)
- College: Marquette

Career history
- Chicago Bears (1934); Brooklyn Dodgers (1934–1935); Green Bay Packers (1936–1938); Pittsburgh Pirates (1939); Columbus Bullies of the AFL III (1941)

Awards and highlights
- NFL champion (1936)

Career statistics
- Games played: 54
- Receptions / Yards: 28 / 422
- Touchdowns: 2
- Stats at Pro Football Reference

Wayland Herman Becker (November 2, 1910 – December 1, 1984) was an American football player. He played in the National Football League (NFL) for six seasons.

== Early life ==
Becker was born in Soperton, Wisconsin, and attended East High School in Green Bay, Wisconsin. While in high school, he twice led his football team to Fox River Valley conference championships in 1928 and 1929. Becker attended Marquette University, where he played football and basketball, lettering twice.

== Football career ==
Becker began his NFL career with the George Halas's Chicago Bears in 1934. He played just two games for the Bears before completing the 1934 season with the Brooklyn Dodgers, with whom he stayed through the 1935 season.

In 1936, Becker went to the Green Bay Packers, where he spent the next three seasons. Those Packers teams played in the NFL Championship Game twice during his tenure, winning in 1936 and losing in 1938.

He finished his NFL career in 1939 with the Pittsburgh Pirates. The Pirates released him after two games.

In 1941, he was on the Columbus Bullies of the American Football League. The team won the AFL championship, and the league's coaches named Becker second-team All-League based on his performance that season.
