= Chicago and North-Western Land Office =

- U.S. National Register of Historic Places
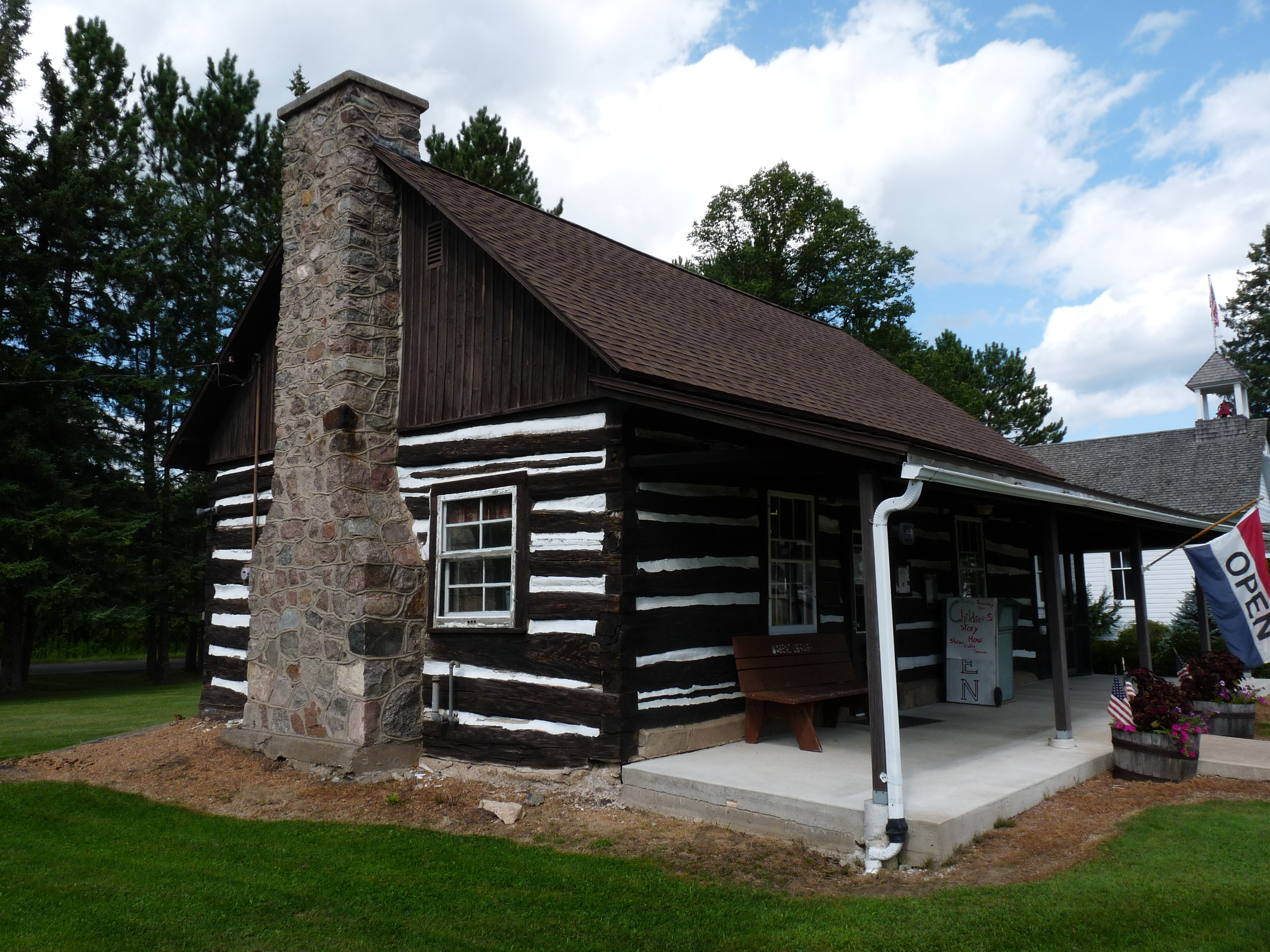

- Location within Wisconsin Location within the United States
- Location: 4556 N. Branch St., Wabeno, Wisconsin
- Coordinates: 45°26′21″N 88°39′39″W
- Area: less than one acre
- Built: 1895
- Architectural style: Late Victorian
- MPS: Public Library Facilities of Wisconsin MPS
- NRHP reference No.: 93001446
- Added to NRHP: December 23, 1993

The Chicago and North-Western Land Office, now the Wabeno Public Library, is a historic building in Wabeno, Wisconsin, United States. The building was constructed as a land office for the Chicago and Northwestern Railway in 1897 and was one of the first buildings in Wabeno. The Town of Wabeno bought the building in 1923 and later converted it to a library. The library is now the only log library in the state. On December 23, 1993, the building was added to the National Register of Historic Places.
