= Wabeno (CDP), Wisconsin =

Census-designated place in Wisconsin, United States

Wabeno, Wisconsin
- Census-designated place
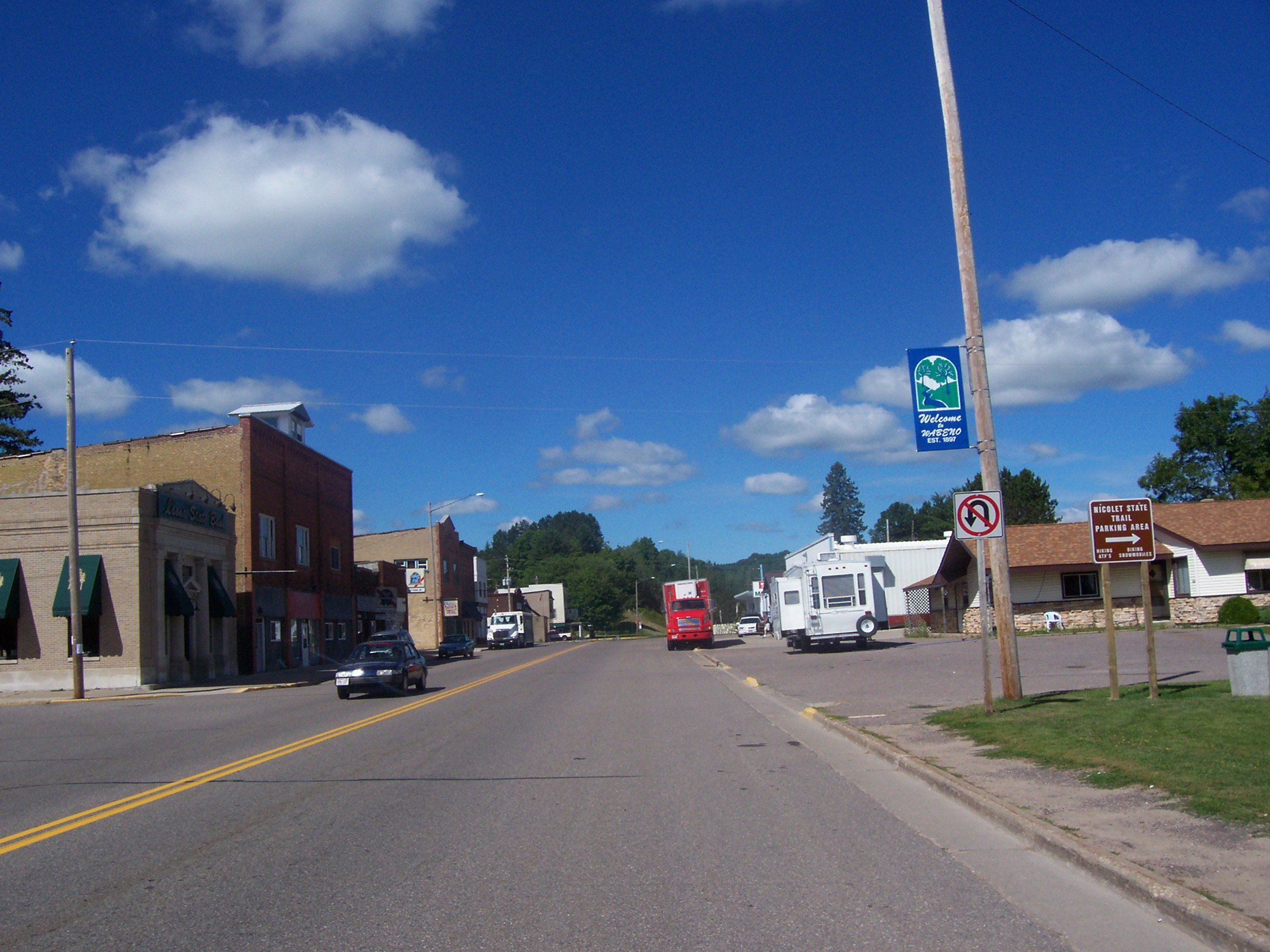
- Looking north at downtown Wabeno

- Location within Wisconsin
- Coordinates: 45°26′19″N 88°39′37″W
- Country: United States
- State: Wisconsin
- County: Forest

Area
  - Total: 2.421 sq mi (6.27 km^{2})
  - Land: 2.421 sq mi (6.27 km^{2})
  - Water: 0 sq mi (0 km^{2})
- Elevation: 1,539 ft (469 m)

Population (2020)
  - Total: 453
  - Density: 187/sq mi (72.2/km^{2})
- Time zone: UTC-6 (Central (CST))
  - Summer (DST): UTC-5 (CDT)
- Area codes: 715 & 534
- GNIS feature ID: 1580716

Wabeno is an unincorporated census-designated place located within the town of Wabeno, in Forest County, Wisconsin, United States. It is located on Wisconsin Highway 32 at the eastern terminus of Wisconsin Highway 52 within the Nicolet National Forest. As of the 2020 census, its population was 453, down from 575 at the 2010 census.

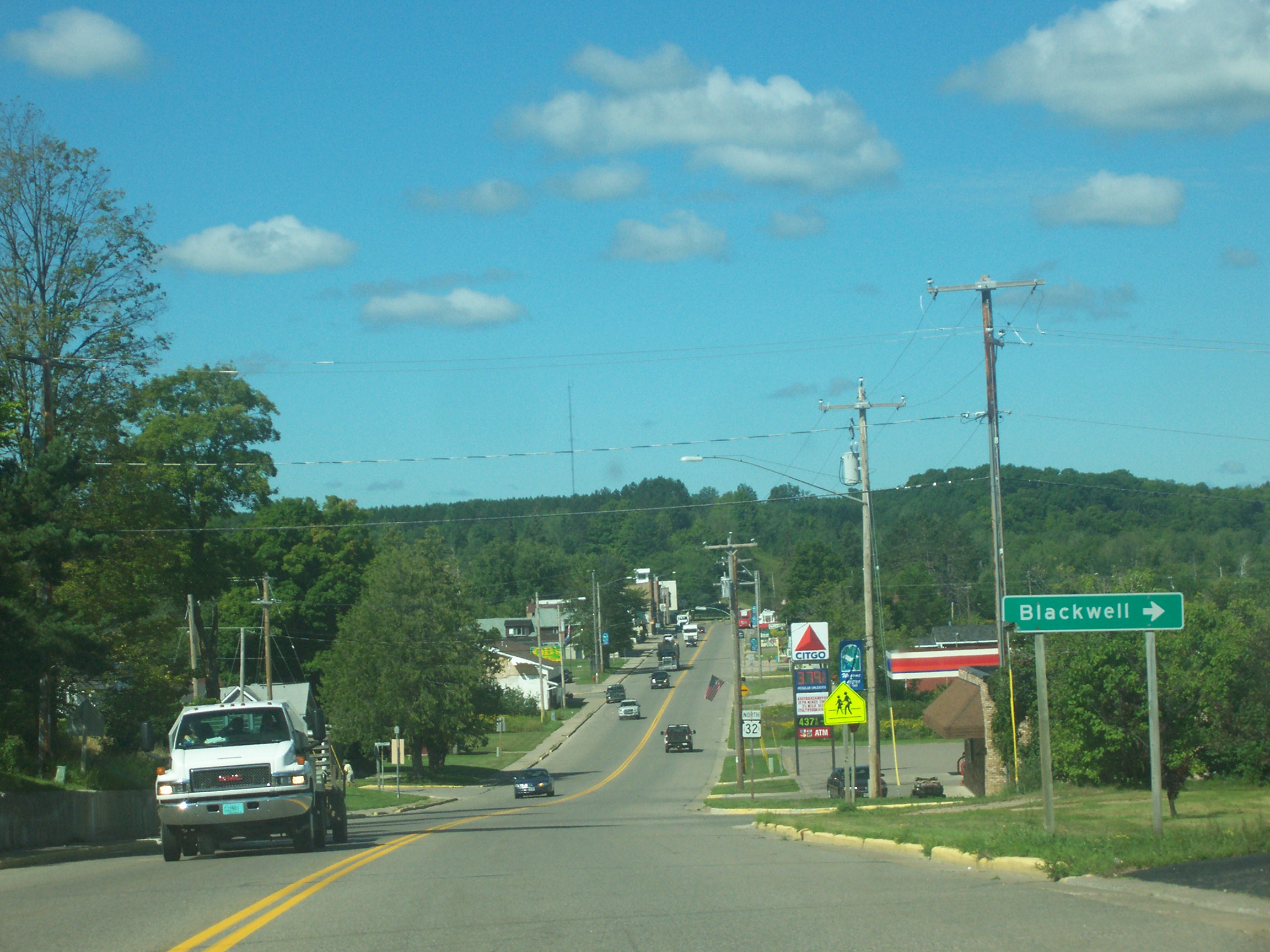
Wabeno skyline

== History ==
The unincorporated community of Wabeno was built in an area where timber had been cleared by a tornado in June 1880. Wabeno was platted in 1897. The town's name is derived from "waubeno" a Potawatomi word for "coming of the winds". A brief lumber boom occurred when the Chicago and North Western Railway pushed a line through the tiny town. In 1905, there were five sawmills in operation in Wabeno, producing 35,000,000 board feet (80,000 m^{3}) of lumber per year. The last mill closed in 1936.

== Attractions ==
The unincorporated community of Wabeno is located 4 miles (6 km) from Northern Lights Bingo and Casino, run by the Forest County Potawatomi. For much of the year, it is possible to travel from Wabeno to Northern Lights by either snowmobile or ATV.

The Wabeno area is home to the Lumberjack Memorial Snowmobile Trails, a system that includes over 100 miles (160 km) of groomed and maintained snowmobile trails.

Other attractions in Wabeno include: an old-fashioned band shell located in the downtown green, a logging museum, a rare, and still functional, steam-powered Phoenix log hauler, a 20-foot (6.1 m) fiberglass statue of Larry the Logroller, a World War II–era Sherman tank, and a nineteenth-century log cabin still in use as the Wabeno Public Library.

Annual events include: A Memorial Day truck pull, Steam-up Days (a celebration of antique technology) in July; and the Logging Exposition and Harvest Festival on Labor Day weekend. Wabeno is the home of spring and fall dual sport motorcycle events hosted by the Wisconsin Dual Sport Riders.

Wabeno's tap water was selected as the best tasting water in the state in 2003, and this has led to the town bottling the water under the name of "Wabeno Water."

== Images ==
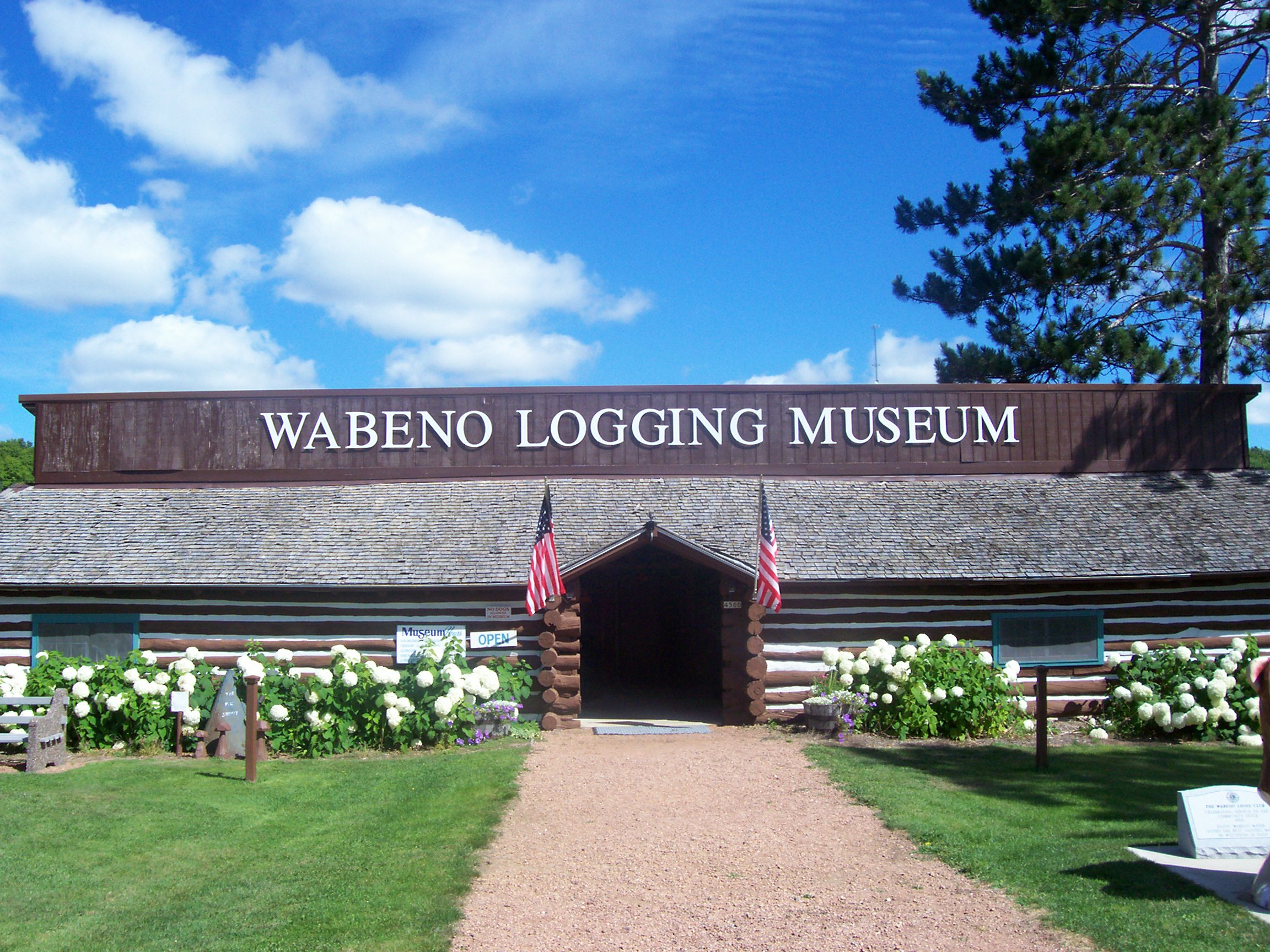
Wabeno Logging Museum

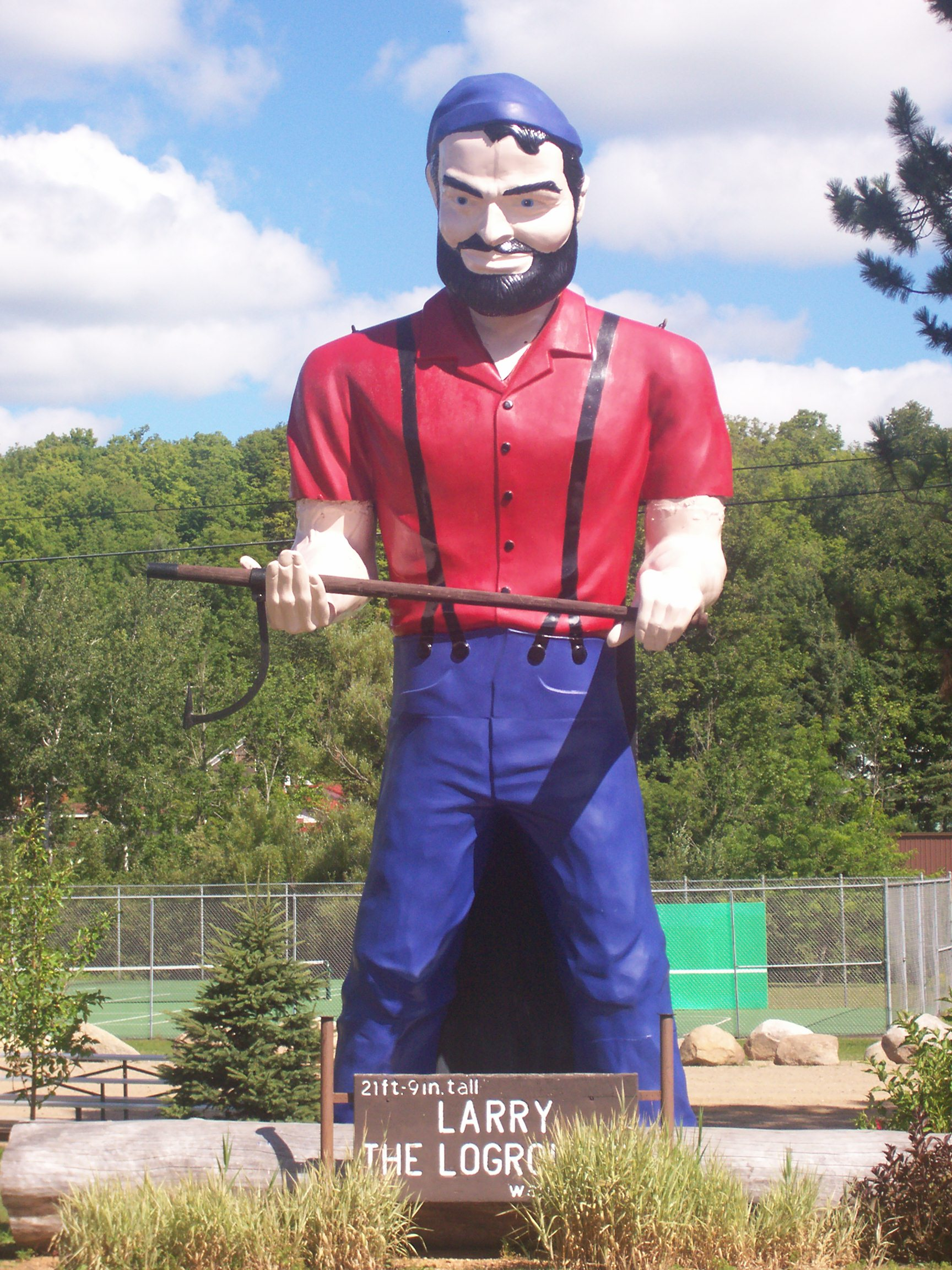
Larry the Logroller

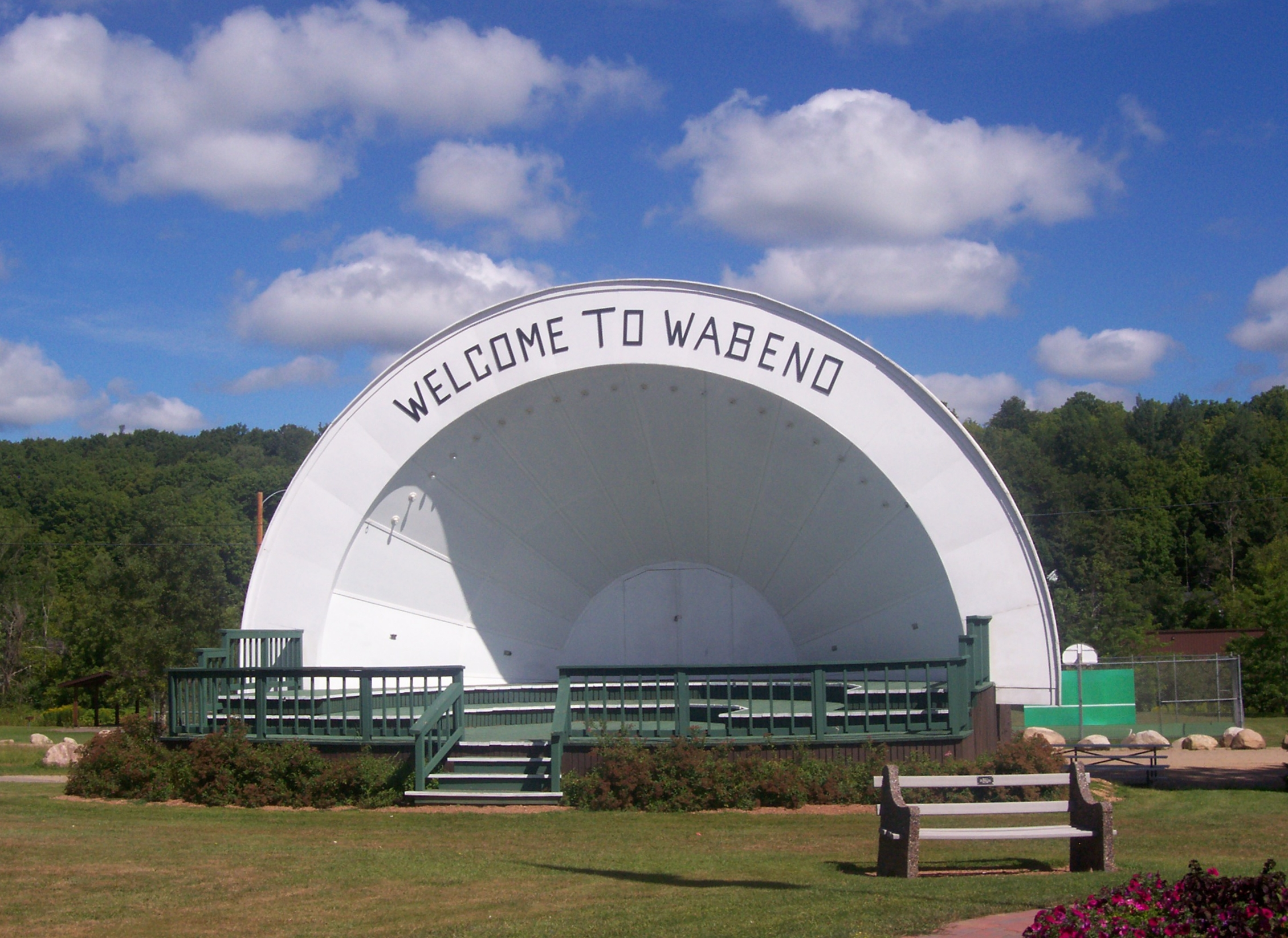
Band shell

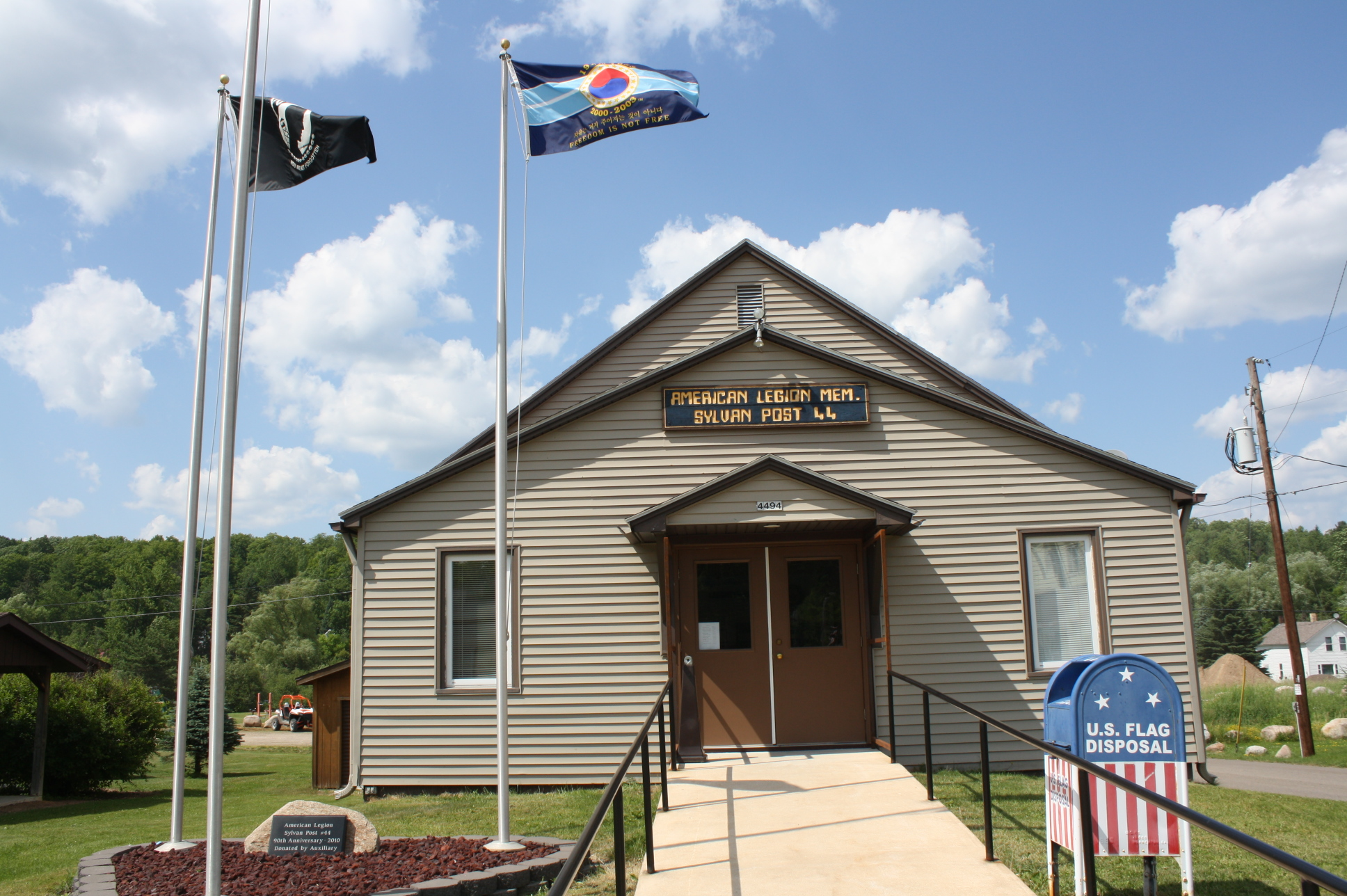
American Legion building

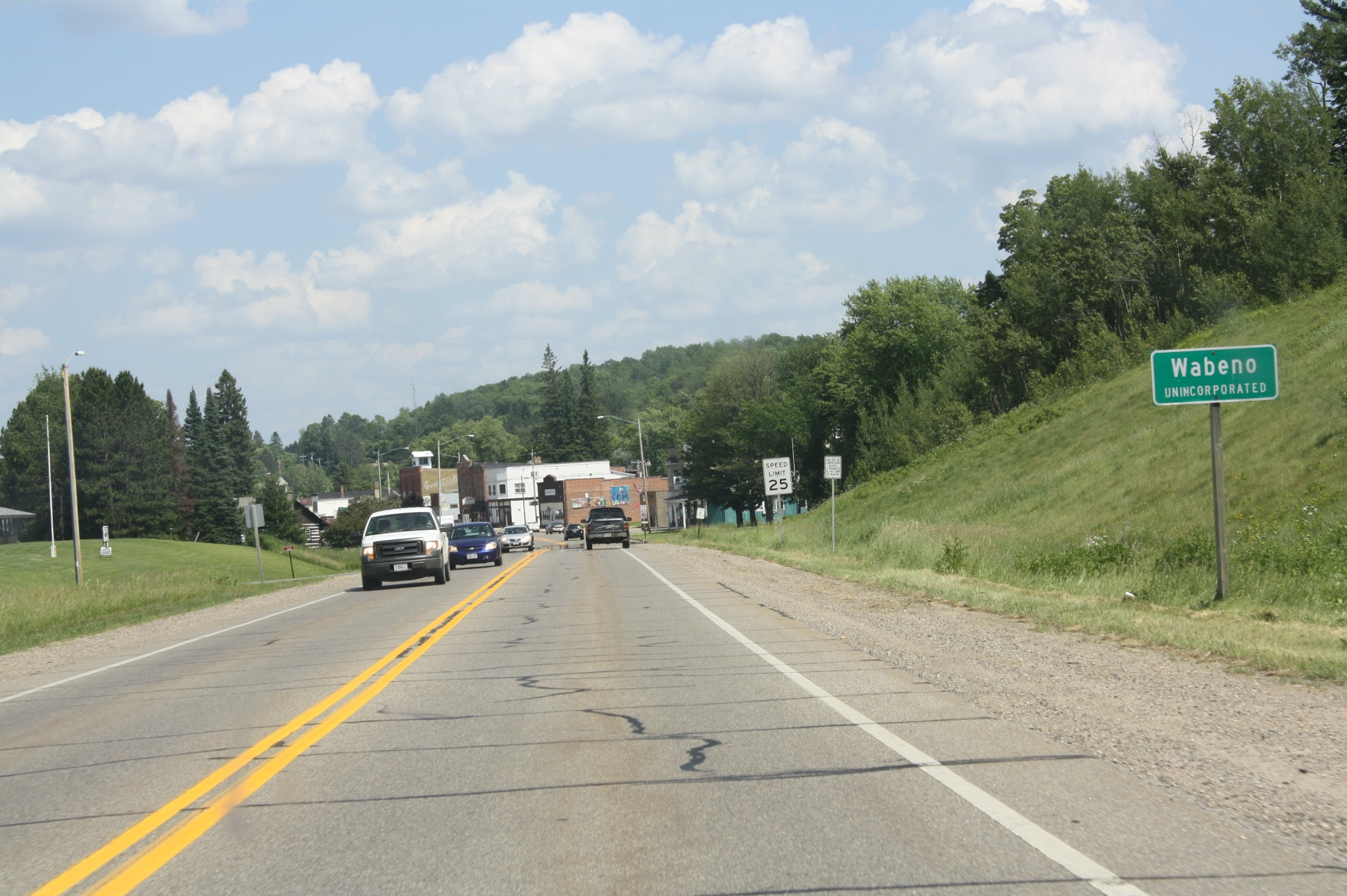
Sign
