= Soperton, Wisconsin =

- Unincorporated community
- Location within Wisconsin Location within the United States
- Coordinates: 45°26′18″N 88°38′10″W
- Country: United States
- State: Wisconsin
- County: Forest
- Elevation: 1,555 ft (474 m)
- Time zone: UTC-6 (Central (CST))
  - Summer (DST): UTC-5 (CDT)
- Area codes: 715 & 534
- GNIS feature ID: 1580447

Soperton is an unincorporated community located within the town of Wabeno, in Forest County, Wisconsin, United States.

== History ==
A post office called Soperton was established in 1905, and remained in operation until it was discontinued in 1956. The community was named after the Soper Lumber Company which operated in the area.

== Notable people ==
- Wayland Becker, football player, was born in Soperton.
