= Aldo Leopold Nature Center =

Wisconsin educational reserve

- Interactive map of Aldo Leopold Nature Center
- Type: Nature center
- Location: 330 Femrite Drive, Monona, Wisconsin
- Coordinates: 43.05451°N 89.32105°W
- Area: 21 acres (8.5 ha)
- Created: 1994
- Hiking trails: 2.5 miles (4.0 km)
- Website: aldoleopoldnaturecenter.org

Aldo Leopold Nature Center is an independent, non-profit nature center located in Monona, Wisconsin. Located on 21-acre (0.085 km^{2}) and featuring self-guided hiking trails through reclaimed prairie, marsh and basswood forest, the Aldo Leopold Nature Center is adjacent to Monona-owned 20-acre Woodland Park and the City of Madison-owned 60-acre Edna Taylor Conservation Park.

The visitor center features hands-on exhibits about wetland, woodland, and prairie ecosystems in the Nature Nook and the Climate Science Education Center features exhibits about renewable energy, climate science and sustainability. The Climate Science Education Center opened in 2012, with an exhibit about global warming that was donated to the center by the Koshland Science Museum in Washington, D.C.

The Aldo Leopold Nature Center's environmental education programs include Wonder Bugs (a safe and fun introduction to the natural world for preschool-aged children and parent/caregiver), Vacation Day and Homeschool programs, School Field Trip programs, Summer Camps, Scout programs, Family public programs, special events, and adult and teacher workshops.

Nature Net, created by the Aldo Leopold Nature Center, is the Southern Wisconsin Environmental Learning Network of non-profit organizations that offer experiential, place-based environmental education. It offers resources for teachers and families to help connect children with nature.

Established in 1994, the organization is named for Wisconsin conservationist Aldo Leopold and its mission is "to engage and educate current and future generations, empowering them to respect, protect, and enjoy the natural world."
