= Lumberjack Steam Train =

Coordinates: 45°33′41.4″N 88°40′58.5″W

The Lumberjack Steam Train is a passenger excursion train operated on the Laona and Northern Railway, a heritage railroad located in Laona, Wisconsin and part of the Camp 5 Museum. It is operated by the non-profit Camp 5 Museum Foundation, Inc. The train runs 1.3 miles (2.1 km) from the outskirts of Laona to the museum site.

The train consists of a steam locomotive, two steel passenger coaches, and three cabooses.

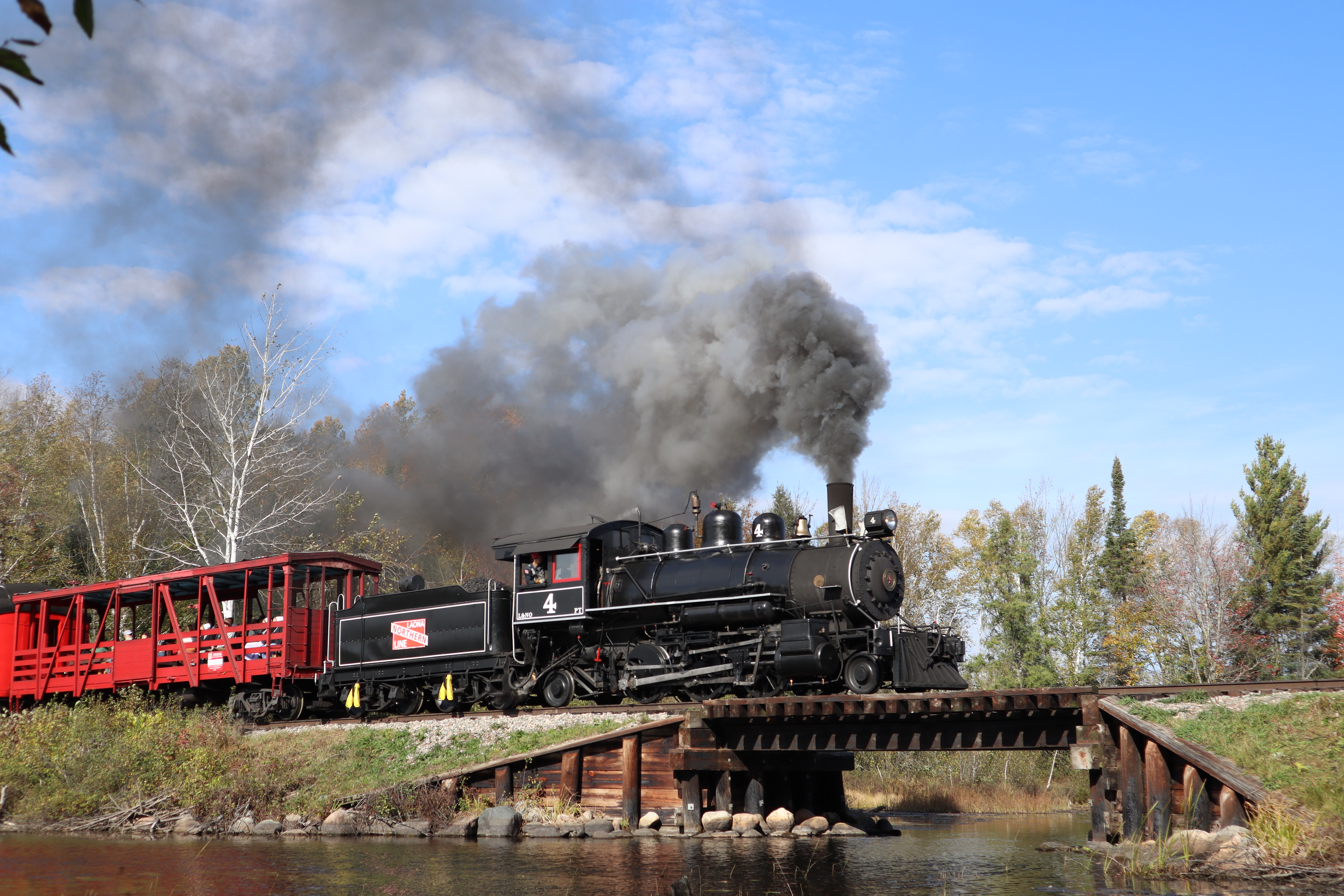
Crossing over the Rat River, 2024

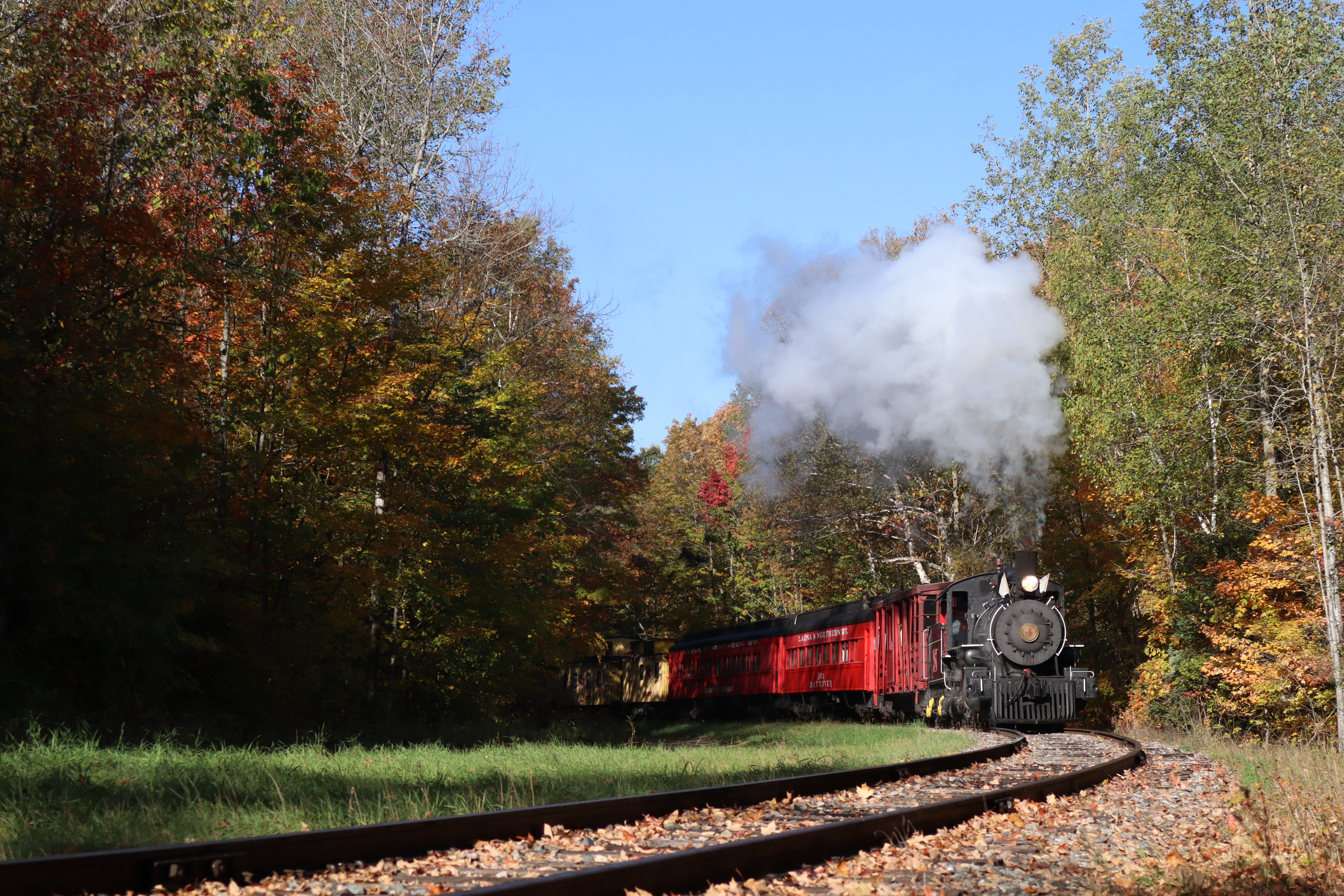
Rounding the curve at Silver Lake Junction, 2024

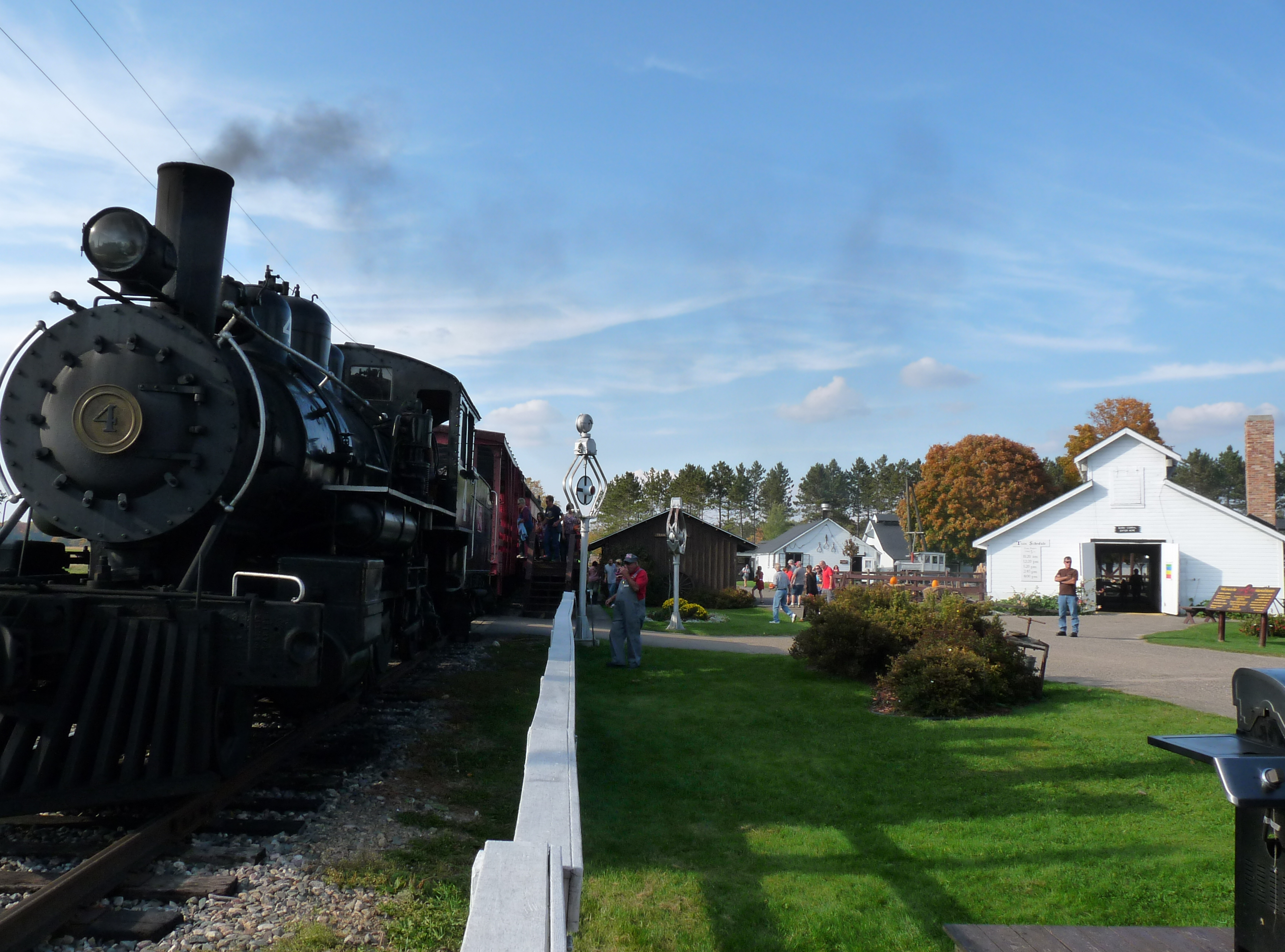
Stationed at Camp 5, 2014

The locomotive, named the "4-spot," is a 2-6-2 steam locomotive built in 1916 by the Vulcan Iron Works in Wilkes-Barre, Pennsylvania. The Laona and Northern received it on September 22, 1926 to haul timber from nearby logging camps to their mill in Laona. At 109,600 pounds, it is said to be the largest steam engine built by Vulcan that is still operating in the U.S.

The American Car and Foundry Company built the coach named the “Hamilton Roddis” in 1923 for the Soo Line Railroad. The Barney and Smith Company built the coach named the “Otter Creek” in 1911, also for the Soo Line Railroad. It was rebuilt in 1941.

The three passenger cabooses were purchased in 1965 and 1966 from the Duluth, Missabe and Iron Range Railway. Two cabooses have cupolas and offer “up in the trees” views of the passing forest. The third caboose is Soo Line Railroad caboose number 147.

== See also ==
- List of heritage railroads in the United States
