= Camp Five Museum =

- Camp Five Farmstead
- U.S. National Register of Historic Places
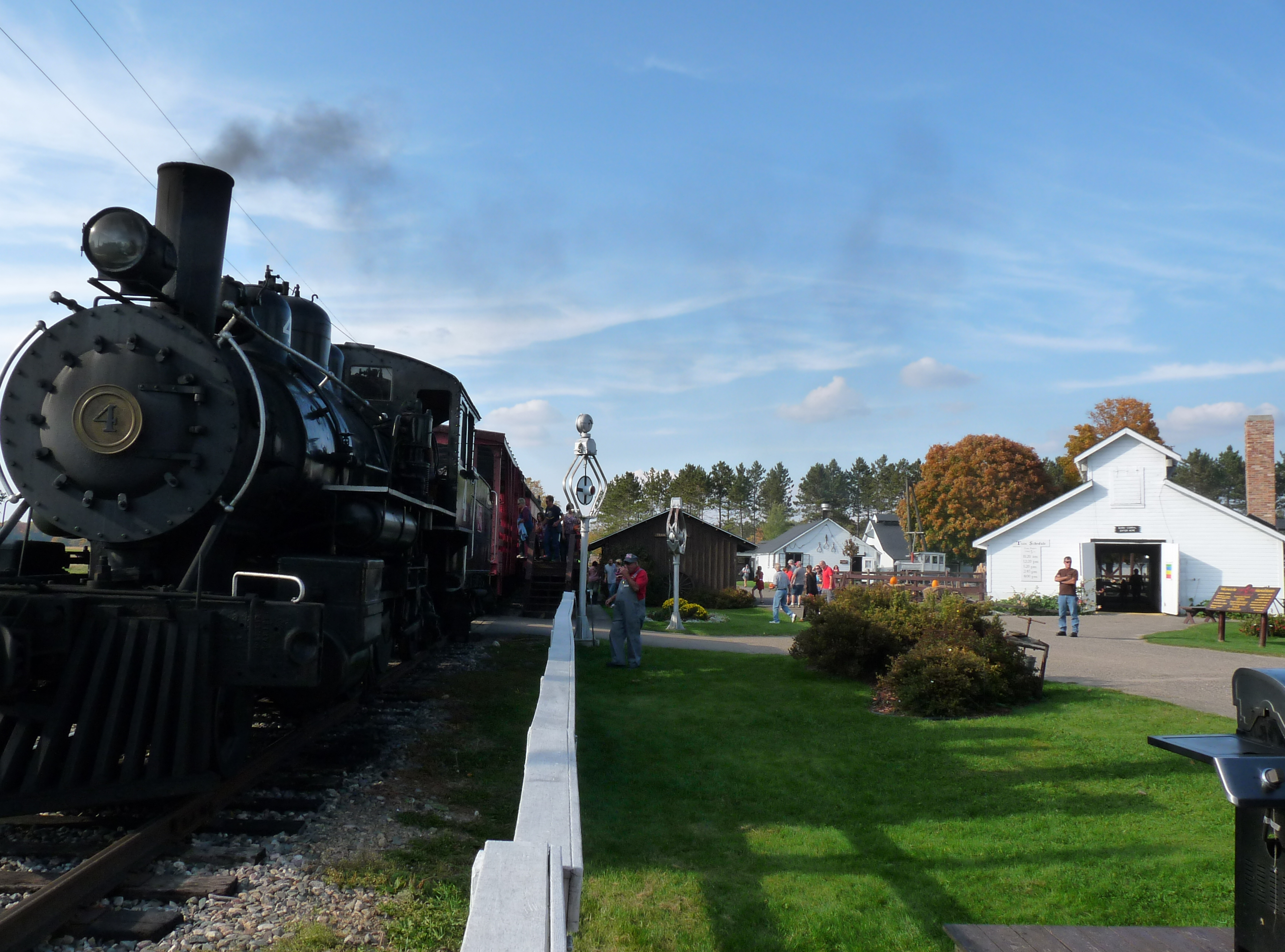

- Location within Wisconsin Location within the United States
- Location: 5466 Connor Farm Rd., Laona, Wisconsin
- Coordinates: 45°34′18″N 88°42′8″W
- Architect: Connor Land & Lumber Company
- Architectural style: Late 19th And 20th Century Revivals
- NRHP reference No.: 95001506
- Added to NRHP: January 11, 1996

The Camp Five Museum is a living history museum located in Laona, Wisconsin, that interprets the forest industry and transportation history of Wisconsin. It includes part or all of the Camp Five Farmstead, also known as Camp Five Logging Camp, which was listed on the National Register of Historic Places in 1996. The museum was established in 1969.

== History ==
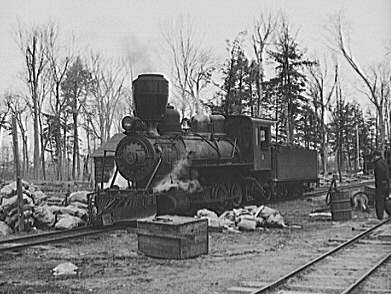
Lumberjack Steam Train

The R Connor Company established a logging camp at this site in the late 1890s, their fifth camp near Laona. By 1914, the timber within reach of the camp was exhausted, so it was converted into a company farm, to supply meat, vegetables, and work horses to Connor's other camps in the area. The site worked well because it was near town, the land in the immediate vicinity was good for farming, and it lay on a rail line. The farm continued to supply Connor's logging camps for decades. In 1969, the farm opened to the public as a history museum.

== Museum ==
The museum site encompasses 4 acres (1.62 ha) and includes a logging and forestry museum, static displays of historic logging equipment and bateaux used in log drives, a slaughterhouse, a petting zoo, a nature center, a small cafeteria, and a museum shop. Two tours run from the site into the surrounding countryside: a forestry tour and a riverboat tour. Each tour takes about twenty minutes. Visitors reach the museum by taking the Lumberjack Steam Train, which runs on the Laona and Northern Railway.

The museum's steam train and blacksmithy are part of its daily living history displays. In addition the museum periodically hosts re-enactors of the fur-trade era, cowboys, the Civil War, and World War I.

Awards:

- 1996 - Camp Five was added to the National Register of Historic Places by the US Department of the Interior
- 1987 - Presidential Environmental Youth Award, from the United States Environmental Protection Agency for its education and ecology program for Boy Scouts
- 1978 - Forest History Association of Wisconsin award
- 1975 - Arbor Day Foundation National Award in Education for the Green Treasure Forest Tour
- 1970 - Wisconsin Historical Society Award of Merit
