= International Wildlife Rehabilitation Council =

Founded in 1972, the International Wildlife Rehabilitation Council is a non-profit consortium of wildlife rehabilitators. IWRC began in California's Bay Area to share experiences and resources, and to "develop a professional organization through which North American rehabilitators could network and access information."

== History ==
In the 1970s, there was an intense urban growth and harm of natural habitat in the United States. In response to this phenomenon, formal wildlife rehabilitation organizations began forming across the country. These new programs demonstrated a lack of clear, professional standards of care and support networks primarily using a method based on trial and error. Although the facilities were growing rapidly in the United States, they were functioning in an isolated manner. The founders of IWRC wanted to create a professional association. Through this organization, wildlife rehabilitators could access reliable, science-based, and up-to-date information. They also sought to share the necessary resources “to help improve the quality of care provided to injured wild animals” . Their main mission is to provide science-based education and resources to those who are certified as wildlife rehabilitators, as well as, the public who wishes to become certified. Mainly they seek to promote wildlife conservation and welfare .

== Educational Programs ==
They provide various educational programs, all of which are science-based, to help the individuals learn more about wildlife rehabilitation or help them to become certified professionals . They offer classes similar to a traditional classroom setting, which was the first of its kind, launched in 1984 . The Basic Wildlife Rehabilitation two-day program includes various classes with lectures and labs. Topics covered include basic anatomy and physiology, handling and physical restraint, thermoregulation, stress, initial care and physical examination, nutrition and associated diseases, standards for housing, zoonoses, euthanasia criteria and release criteria. The content and criteria remains the same up to this day and has been delivered to multiple different countries. Classes are held by request about 15-20 times a year in various locations . The IWRC also offers online professional training. The new distance education program emerged in 2005 giving access to online lectures, discussions, and web-examinations . Another way the International Wildlife Rehabilitation Council provides information to rehabilitation scientists is through conferences. The first conference was held in 1977 . They continue to hold these conferences annually by offering science and research-based presentations with the addition of practical skill seminars. They finally offer the option of becoming an IWRC member in order to gain ultimate access to conferences, insights, further information, and to meet with colleagues near and far . The International Wildlife Rehabilitation Council offers all these various methods to get informed and train as a wildlife rehabilitator.

== Board of directors ==
The IWRC contains a board of 13 directors who oversee all activities and concerns of the IWRC, most of whom hold a specific position within the board, be it president, treasurer, secretary, etc. Many of the members of the Board of Directors have grown up with a concern for wildlife and habitat conservation for many years, and continue this love in their respective homes/areas. Members of the board not only have university education, but many also hold degrees from Ivy League universities from around the world, also obtaining prestigious jobs working as veterinarians (such as Francisca Astorga). These not only show the legitimacy of the organization, but the knowledge these individuals bring to the field. The current president of the IWRC is Lynn Miller, a Certified Wildlife Rehabilitator and native New Zealander. Miller attended McGill University in Quebec, ON, and continuing on to achieve her PhD. Her love of knowledge does not only stop there though, as she continues with research through Concordia University. Herself, along with the IWRC, is also involved in work with another group called Le Nichoir, another non-profit organization that focuses on the conservation, care, and public information regarding wild birds.

== Certification ==
In order to become a CWR (Certified Wildlife Rehabilitator), one must be able to pass a test created by the IWRC to become one of few CWR throughout the world. This test ensures that those who are involved in wildlife rehabilitation throughout the world have the proper skills and knowledge to properly protect the earth’s environment. One is not required to be a member of the IWRC to become certified, it is merely an addition to ones experience and professionalism that is encouraged. The test itself is taken from a bank of over 12 000, resulting in personalized tests for each individual undergoing certification, which includes 50 questions that may be true/false, multiple choice, and/or matching. The test may be taken online, or in person with a proctor who is approved by the IWRC (this may include teachers, clergy members, and more). Topics included in the test include areas such as the use of field guides, habitat assessment, euthanasia, and the prevention of conflicts between humans and wildlife. To receive certification as a CWR, one must answer at least 38 questions correctly, if not, one is awarded a fail and is encouraged to retake the test. After two years have passed since taking the test, one’s certification is thus expired and one must retake the test to again have their certification. The IWRC prides itself on providing up to date, scientific-based information and guidelines regarding wildlife conservation, and without this two-year period many CWR would not be aware of new research in their field About Us.
