= Laona, Wisconsin =

- Town
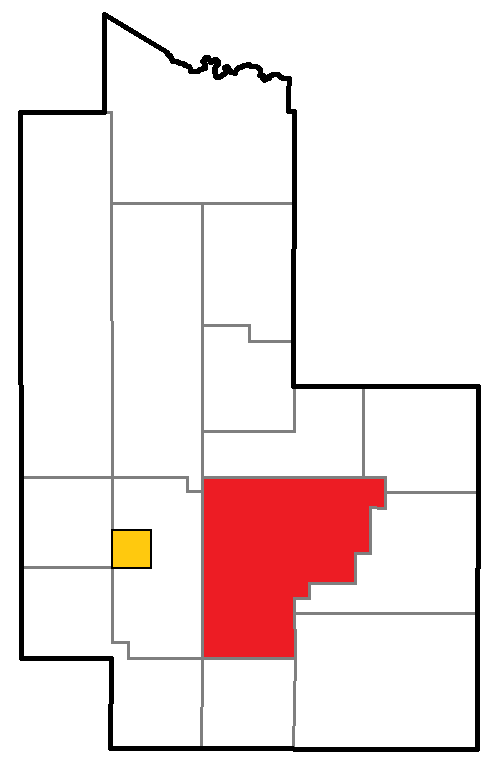
- Location of Laona, within Forest County
- Coordinates: 45°33′26″N 88°41′18″W
- Country: United States
- State: Wisconsin
- County: Forest

Area
  - Total: 107.5 sq mi (278.5 km^{2})
  - Land: 103.4 sq mi (267.8 km^{2})
  - Water: 4.1 sq mi (10.7 km^{2})
- Elevation: 1,572 ft (479 m)

Population (2020)
  - Total: 1,215
  - Density: 11.75/sq mi (4.537/km^{2})
- Time zone: UTC-6 (Central (CST))
  - Summer (DST): UTC-5 (CDT)
- Area codes: 715 & 534
- FIPS code: 55-42500
- GNIS feature ID: 1583528
- Website: https://www.townoflaona.org/

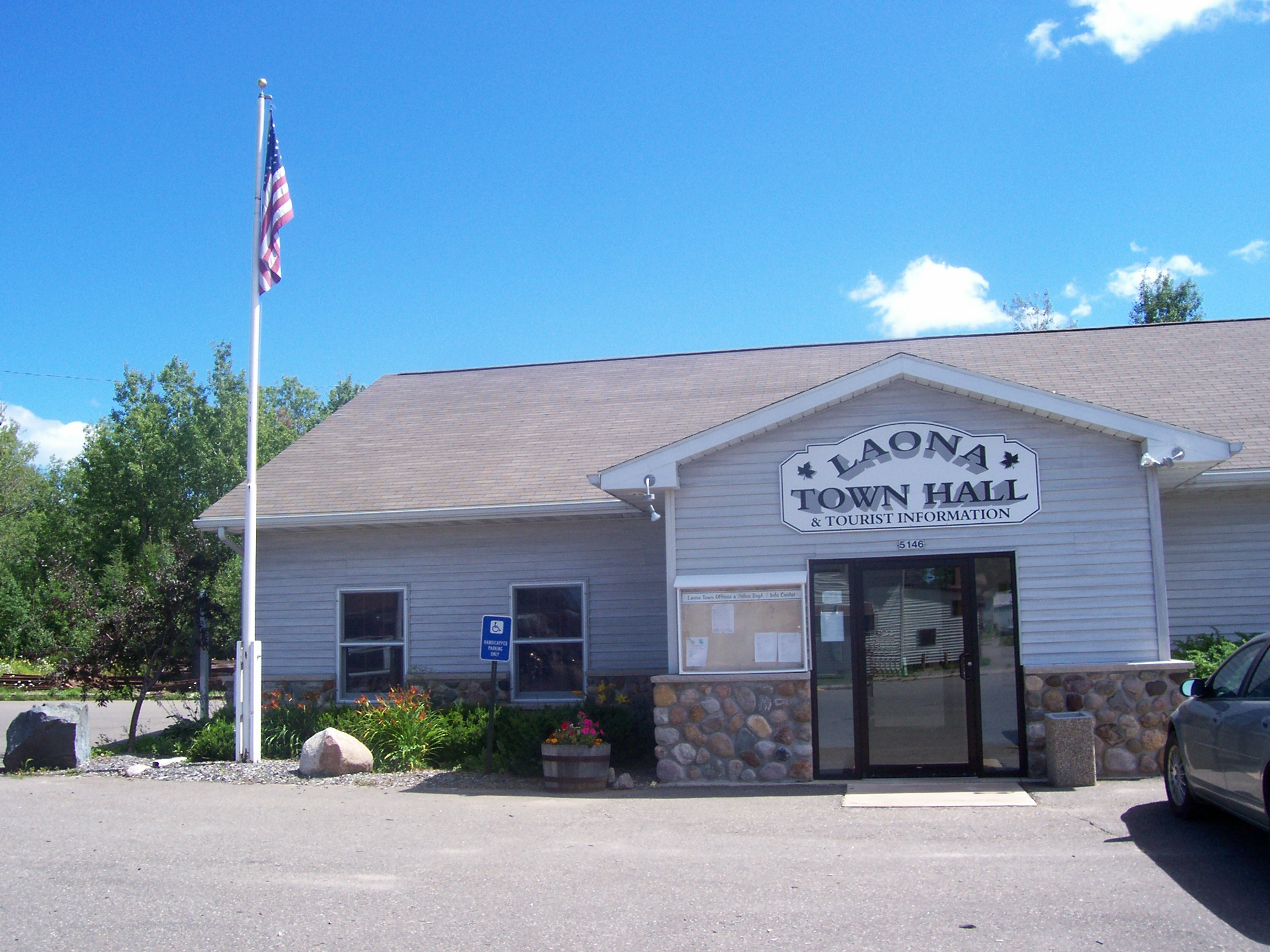
Town hall is located in the town center, which is the unincorporated community of Laona

Laona is a town in Forest County, Wisconsin, United States. The population was 1,215 at the 2020 census. The census-designated place of Laona is located in the town. The unincorporated community of Blackwell Junction is also located partially within the town.

== History ==
The area in which Laona is now located is part of a broad area that was historically inhabited by the Potawatomi people No direct evidence of a Potawatomi settlement in the area is currently known. The Potawatomi word for this place is niyoni.

Laona was platted in 1899 when the railroad was extended to that point. It was named in honor of the daughter of a local businessman. A post office has been in operation in Laona since 1900.

== Geography ==
According to the United States Census Bureau, the town has a total area of 107.5 square miles (278 km^{2}), of which 103.4 square miles (268 km^{2}) is land and 4.2 square miles (11 km^{2}), or 3.86%, is water. The latitude of Laona is 45.564N. The longitude is −88.673W. It is in the Central Standard time zone. Elevation is 1,572 feet (479 m).

=== Climate ===
Climate data for Laona 6 SW, Wisconsin, 1991–2020 normals, 1927-2020 extremes: 1695ft (517m)
Month	Jan	Feb	Mar	Apr	May	Jun	Jul	Aug	Sep	Oct	Nov	Dec	Year
Record high °F (°C)	54 (12)	63 (17)	78 (26)	90 (32)	100 (38)	99 (37)	102 (39)	99 (37)	98 (37)	86 (30)	75 (24)	58 (14)	102 (39)
Mean maximum °F (°C)	38.6 (3.7)	44.4 (6.9)	58.8 (14.9)	72.7 (22.6)	80.7 (27.1)	83.6 (28.7)	83.4 (28.6)	82.2 (27.9)	78.8 (26.0)	73.5 (23.1)	56.4 (13.6)	42.7 (5.9)	86.0 (30.0)
Mean daily maximum °F (°C)	19.7 (−6.8)	24.3 (−4.3)	35.9 (2.2)	49.2 (9.6)	63.1 (17.3)	70.0 (21.1)	73.4 (23.0)	71.4 (21.9)	63.7 (17.6)	52.3 (11.3)	36.9 (2.7)	25.1 (−3.8)	48.8 (9.3)
Daily mean °F (°C)	11.8 (−11.2)	15.0 (−9.4)	26.0 (−3.3)	38.7 (3.7)	51.8 (11.0)	60.2 (15.7)	64.2 (17.9)	62.4 (16.9)	54.8 (12.7)	43.4 (6.3)	29.8 (−1.2)	18.1 (−7.7)	39.7 (4.3)
Mean daily minimum °F (°C)	4.0 (−15.6)	5.7 (−14.6)	16.0 (−8.9)	28.1 (−2.2)	40.6 (4.8)	50.5 (10.3)	55.0 (12.8)	53.5 (11.9)	45.9 (7.7)	34.6 (1.4)	22.7 (−5.2)	11.2 (−11.6)	30.7 (−0.8)
Mean minimum °F (°C)	−17.6 (−27.6)	−14.7 (−25.9)	−7.8 (−22.1)	14.5 (−9.7)	26.8 (−2.9)	35.9 (2.2)	43.0 (6.1)	41.3 (5.2)	30.9 (−0.6)	22.5 (−5.3)	5.3 (−14.8)	−10.6 (−23.7)	−21.4 (−29.7)
Record low °F (°C)	−39 (−39)	−39 (−39)	−34 (−37)	−9 (−23)	15 (−9)	23 (−5)	29 (−2)	25 (−4)	17 (−8)	0 (−18)	−17 (−27)	−29 (−34)	−39 (−39)
Average precipitation inches (mm)	1.34 (34)	1.25 (32)	1.88 (48)	3.11 (79)	3.78 (96)	4.70 (119)	4.00 (102)	3.20 (81)	3.76 (96)	3.31 (84)	2.07 (53)	1.74 (44)	34.14 (868)
Average snowfall inches (cm)	16.40 (41.7)	12.60 (32.0)	13.70 (34.8)	9.50 (24.1)	0.80 (2.0)	0.00 (0.00)	0.00 (0.00)	0.00 (0.00)	0.00 (0.00)	2.30 (5.8)	9.30 (23.6)	15.50 (39.4)	80.1 (203.4)
Source 1: NOAA
Source 2: XMACIS (records & monthly max/mins)

== Demographics ==
As of the census of 2000, there were 1,367 people, 564 households, and 395 families residing in the town. The population density was 13.2 people per square mile (5.1/km^{2}). There were 850 housing units at an average density of 8.2 per square mile (3.2/km^{2}). The racial makeup of the town was 95.90% White, 0.44% African American, 2.41% Native American, 0.07% Asian, 0.07% from other races, and 1.10% from two or more races. Hispanic or Latino of any race were 0.37% of the population.

There were 564 households, out of which 32.1% had children under the age of 18 living with them, 57.1% were married couples living together, 9.6% had a female householder with no husband present, and 29.8% were non-families. 27.1% of all households were made up of individuals, and 13.1% had someone living alone who was 65 years of age or older. The average household size was 2.42 and the average family size was 2.91.

In the town, the population was spread out, with 26.1% under the age of 18, 5.9% from 18 to 24, 26.0% from 25 to 44, 23.2% from 45 to 64, and 18.8% who were 65 years of age or older. The median age was 40 years. For every 100 females, there were 92.8 males. For every 100 females age 18 and over, there were 91.3 males.

The median income for a household in the town was $31,852, and the median income for a family was $41,042. Males had a median income of $29,674 versus $21,154 for females. The per capita income for the town was $15,652. About 8.7% of families and 11.2% of the population were below the poverty line, including 14.7% of those under age 18 and 6.2% of those age 65 or over.

== Recreation ==
The community is the site of the Lumberjack Steam Train, an operating turn-of-the-century passenger train and award-winning museum.

In the winter, Laona is home to the 100 Mile Snow Safari or "100 miler", one of Wisconsin's oldest and most distinctive snowmobiling trails. It offers nearly 100 miles (160 km) of undeveloped trail riding in a trail system. With dozens of undeveloped lakes and miles of undeveloped timberland to ride through, it is one of Wisconsin's most popular snowmobiling trails.
