= List of National Natural Landmarks in Wisconsin =

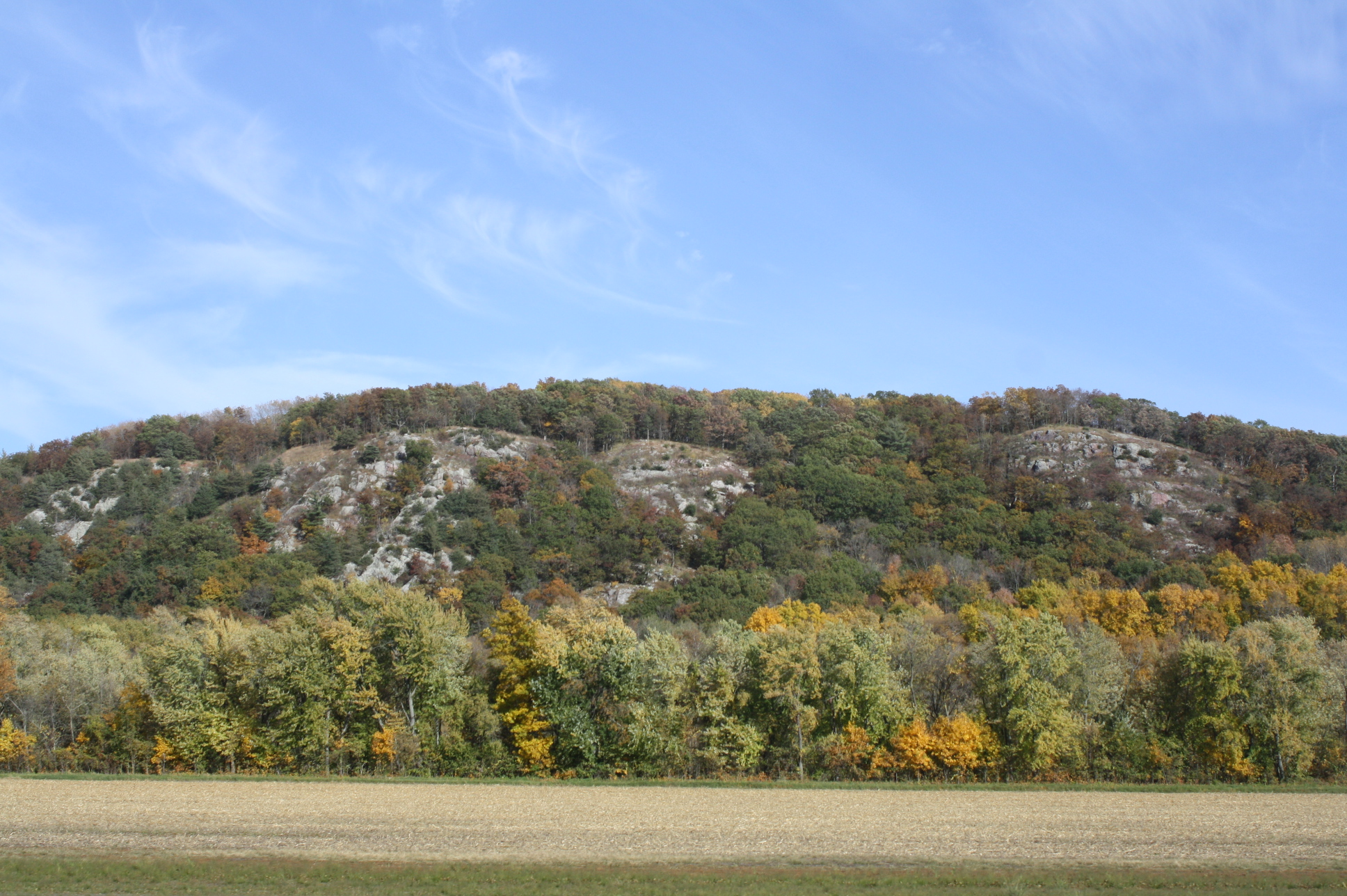
Baraboo Range

The National Natural Landmarks (NNLs) in Wisconsin include 18 of the almost 600 such landmarks in the United States. They cover areas of geological, biological and historical importance, and include dune and swales, swamps, bogs, and virgin forests. Several of the sites provide habitat for rare or endangered plant and animal species. The Driftless Area in southwest Wisconsin is known for its rare species, especially in the Baraboo Range. Owners include private individuals, Native American tribes, and several county, state and federal agencies. These landmarks were designed between 1967 and 1987. They vary in size between 44 and 53,531 acres (18 and 21,663 hectares).

The National Natural Landmarks Program is administered by the National Park Service, a branch of the Department of the Interior. The National Park Service determines which properties meet NNL criteria and, after notifying the owners, makes nomination recommendations. The Secretary of the Interior reviews nominations and, based on a set of predetermined criteria, makes a decision on NNL designation or a determination of eligibility for designation. Both public and privately owned properties can be designated as NNLs. Owners may object to the nomination of the property as a NNL. This designation provides indirect, partial protection of the historic integrity of the properties via tax incentives, grants, monitoring of threats, and other means.

Wisconsin National Natural Landmarks (clickable map)

== National Natural Landmarks ==
Name	Image	Date	Location	County	Size (acres)	Ownership	Description
Abraham's Woods		1973	42°40′58″N 89°29′2″W	Green	44	state	A remnant of regional climax maple-basswood forest.
Avoca River-Bottom Prairie		1980	43°12′3″N 90°18′17″W	Iowa	762	state	The largest intact prairie in Wisconsin.
Baraboo Range		1980	43°25′30″N 89°39′20″W	Columbia / Sauk	53,531	state, private	An example of an exhumed mountain range.
Bose Lake Hemlock Hardwoods		1980	45°55′56″N 88°58′19″W	Forest	62	federal	The best virgin stand of hemlock in Wisconsin. Part of Chequamegon-Nicolet National Forest.
Cave of the Mounds		1987	43°1′5″N 89°48′58″W	Dane	63	private	Cave richly decorated with cave formations of most known varieties.
Cedarburg Bog		1973	43°23′14″N 88°0′27″W	Ozaukee	2817	state, private	The largest and most outstanding bog in southeastern Wisconsin.
Chippewa River Bottoms	–	1973		Buffalo	8086	federal, state	The largest single stand of bottomland hardwood forest along the once widespread post-glacial forest.
Chiwaukee Prairie		1973	42°33′18″N 88°49′0″W	Kenosha	485	state, private	The best remaining wet prairie in Wisconsin along the shore of Lake Michigan.
Finnerud Forest Scientific Area		1973	45°51′29″N 89°44′53″W	Oneida	117	state	An excellent representative of the northern coniferous forest complex.
Flambeau River Hemlock-Hardwood Forest		1973	45°44′54″N 90°45′51″W	Price / Sawyer	391	state	The best and largest remnant of old-growth conifer-hardwood forest in Wisconsin.
Kakagon Sloughs		1973	46°39′44″N 90°44′28″W	Ashland	2932	Bad River Tribe, Private	One of the finest marsh complexes on the upper Great Lakes.
Kickapoo River Natural Area	–	1975	43°53′53″N 90°27′27″W	Vernon	5841	federal, state	The largest undisturbed concentration of exposed seeping sandstone in Wisconsin. Flora and river meanderings typical of the Driftless Area
Moquah Barrens Research Natural Area		1980	46°37′35″N 91°15′0″W	Bayfield	632	federal	Representative of the jack pine-scrub oak barrens (savannas) of the glacial outwash area. Found in the Chequamegon National Forest of northwestern Wisconsin.
Point Beach Ridges		1980	44°12′49″N 87°30′55″W	Manitowoc	151	state	Alternating ridges and swales formed by previous water levels of Lake Michigan.
The Ridges Sanctuary		1967	45°4′22″N 87°7′7″W	Door	2281	federal, state	A series of sand ridges and swales with associated boreal forest and bog vegetation.
Spruce Lake Bog		1967	43°40′14″N 88°12′4″W	Fond du Lac	162	state, private	A superb, unspoiled example of a northern bog.
Summerton Bog		1973	43°45′3″N 89°31′23″W	Marquette	266	private	An undisturbed and floristically diverse area providing habitat for many rare plant and animal species.
Wyalusing Hardwood Forest		1973	42°58′47″N 91°6′31″W	Grant	214	state	Contains several rare plant species and abundant wildlife, including some endangered species.

== See also ==
- List of National Historic Landmarks in Wisconsin
