= Michael Monfils =

Mayor of Green Bay, Wisconsin (1938–2021)

Michael R. Monfils (December 12, 1938 – May 11, 2021) was an American politician and mayor of Green Bay, Wisconsin.

== Biography ==
Monfils was born on December 12, 1938, in Green Bay, Wisconsin. He attended Ss Peter and Paul School (Green Bay), Sacred Heart Seminary (Oneida, Wisconsin), St. Norbert College (De Pere, Wisconsin), and Loyola University (Chicago). He served as a lieutenant in the United States Army in Germany from 1961 to 1963 and on active reserve with the United States Army Reserve from 1964 to 1967.

Monfils married Mary Peterson in 1967. They had two children. He married Mary Timney in 1986. Monfils worked for Fort Howard Paper Company in Green Bay and was a partner in a direct mail marketing business and a cable television franchise group. After Monfils and his second wife moved to Ohio, he worked for more than 10 years as a labor mediator for the state of Ohio. Monfils died on May 11, 2021, in Peekskill, New York. He was 82.

== Political career ==
Monfils was elected to the Green Bay City Council and the Brown County, Wisconsin Board of Supervisors in 1972 and 1974. He was elected Green Bay mayor in 1975 and served until 1979. During Monfils' term as mayor, Green Bay completed its first comprehensive plan since the 1920s. He did not seek re-election.

In 1980, Monfils was the Democratic candidate for the United States House of Representatives from Wisconsin's 8th congressional district, joining the race in May, after the Rev. Robert John Cornell was forced to abandon his candidacy when Pope John Paul II barred priests from participating in politics. Monfils lost to incumbent Toby Roth. After the loss to Roth, Monfils became a member of the faculty at the University of Wisconsin-Green Bay, teaching government administration.
