= Enterprise Radiation Forest =

Radiation testing site in Wisconsin, US

- Location within Wisconsin Location within the United States
- Interactive map of Enterprise Radiation Forest

Geography
- Location: Oneida County, Wisconsin, United States
- Coordinates: 45.495°N 89.335°W
- Area: 1,440 acres (5.8 km^{2}; 2.25 sq mi)

Administration
- Status: Public

The Enterprise Radiation Forest is a forest in Oneida County, Wisconsin, United States, near the town of Enterprise. It was the subject of a study on the effects of radiation in the 1970s. The forest is located within the Enterprise block of the Oneida County Forest.

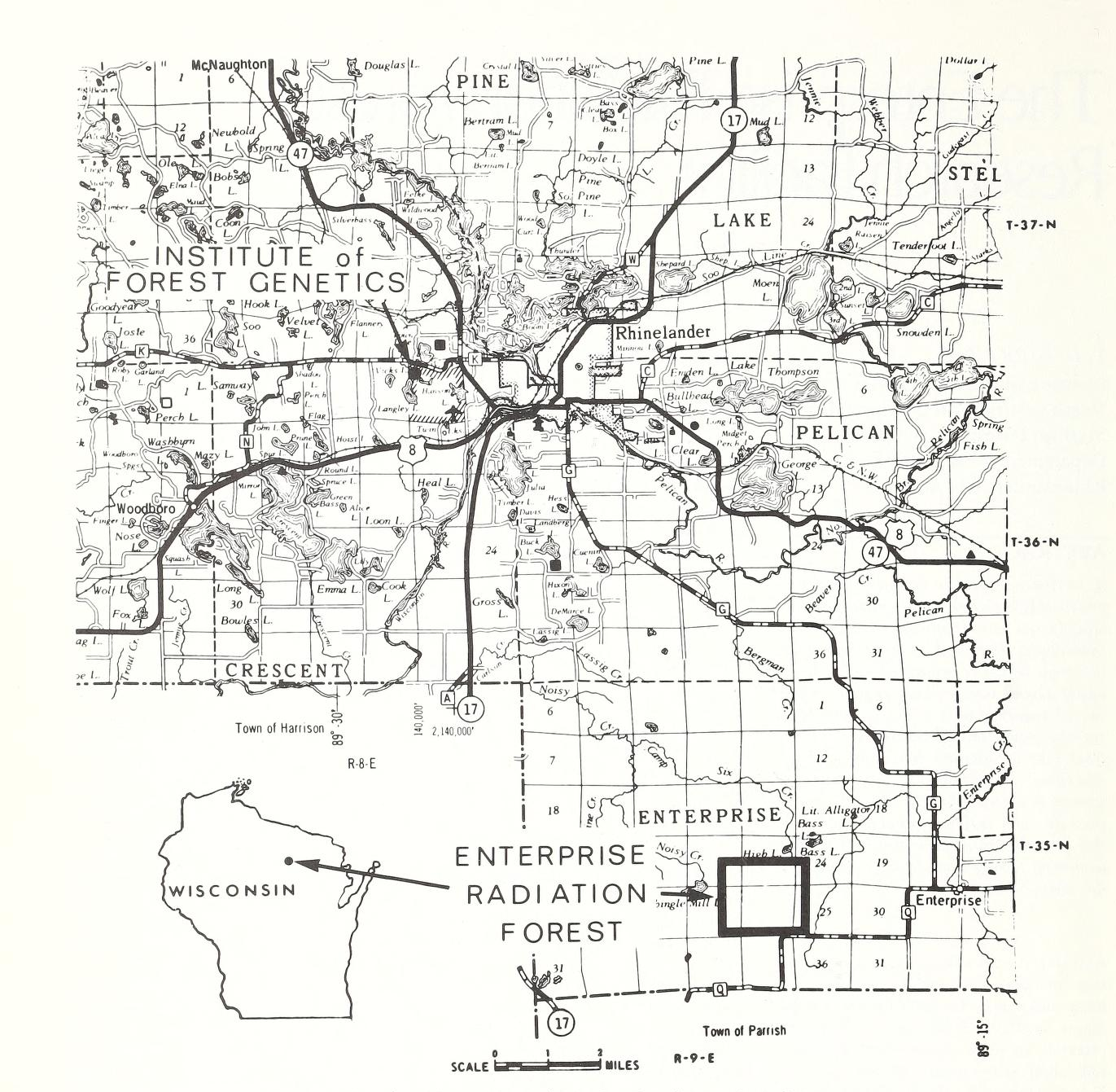
Map showing the location of the Enterprise Radiation Forest

== History ==
Prior to logging, the area later known as the Enterprise Forest was inhabited by red and white pine and other northern hardwood species. It was logged between 1910 and 1914, and the logs were shipped elsewhere using a now-dismantled railroad which crossed the southeastern portion of the Radiation Forest. From 1914 onwards most of the land was transferred to public ownership. Almost all of the existing forest burned in wildfires before 1926, as fires were common in logged forests, and therefore most of the trees date from 1926 or later; that year the fire management responsibilities were taken up by the State of Wisconsin.

=== Radiation research ===
In the mid-20th century the Institute of Forest Genetics in Rhinelander was already studying tree breeding and the effects of ionizing radiation upon trees. In the context of the Cold War and fear of nuclear action by the Soviet Union, the Atomic Energy Commission provided a grant to the Rhinelander researchers to further study radiation effects on forest ecosystems. The aim was to be able to predict the effects of a nuclear disaster.

The Enterprise Radiation Forest project started in 1968. Around 1,440 acres were procured and fenced off in the Enterprise Forest, which is owned by Oneida County. The land was leased to the US Forest Service for 20 years starting on August 1, 1969, for $8,476 ($74,415 in 2025). A catalogue was made of all flora and fauna species in the area. In August 1971 researchers acquired a lead pig containing 10,000 curies of the radiation source caesium-137, which had previously been located at research facilities in Oak Ridge, Tennessee and Puerto Rico. They chose a radiation site ("Site 1") at a location where multiple forest types (aspen, paper birch, and northern hardwood) converged. A small research building 0.5 miles away from the radiation site held equipment and served as a location to conduct the experiment from.

Starting on May 3, 1972, the forest was irradiated for 20 hours per day with four hours designated for research. Thomas Rudolph, the head of the project, spent a large proportion of his time assuaging the concerns of locals and congresspeople. Although the project was originally planned to last 20 years, the irradiation was ended on October 16, 1972, after one growing season, due to budget cuts. After the end of irradiation, the research team continued gathering data. The project was officially terminated on June 30, 1974. The site was dismantled and the land became public forest again. No long-term effects of the radiation experiment on the forest ecosystem were identified.

== Ecosystem ==
The soil composition of the Enterprise Radiation Forest is primarily peat, with the rest being loam and silt loam. The forest is roughly half wetland and half second-growth deciduous forest; in 1970 the trees had an average age of 24.4 years.

=== Flora ===
Johanna Clausen recorded 193 species of vascular plants around Site 1, and a further 111 species elsewhere in the fenced-off section of the forest. The region in which Oneida County falls is dominated by sugar maple, hemlock, yellow birch, basswood, white pine, red pine, and jack pine, with some influence from true boreal forests to the northwest. Clausen identifies the ground flora as most similar to the "northern dry–mesic" forest type. The most common ground cover species around Site 1 were wild sarsparilla, large-leaved aster, sedge, wild lily-of-the-valley, ricegrass, and bracken fern. (Note: For a full list of flora species at Site 1, see Clausen 1974, pp. 56–59, Table 1. The remaining species in the rest of the Radiation Forest are listed at Clausen 1974, pp. 60–61, Table 2.)

J. Zavitkovski identified quaking aspen, paper birch, red maple, and sugar maple as the most prevalent tree species around Site 1.

=== Fauna ===
The remote location and variety of habitats has resulted in significant faunal diversity. Common amphibians include the American toad, northern spring peeper, green frog, and wood frog, as well as the red-backed salamander. Reptiles identified in the forest are the northern red-bellied snake, eastern garter snake, northern ring-necked snake, eastern smooth green snake, western fox snake, and the western painted turtle. Numerous species of birds have been identified in the forest, with the most common year-round species being the ruffed grouse, raven, blue jay, black-capped chickadee, white-breasted nuthatch, purple finch, hairy woodpecker, and downy woodpecker. (Note: A list of amphibian species in the forest is found at Buech 1974, p. 119, Table 1; reptile species are listed at p. 120, Table 2; avians are listed at p. 121, Table 3; mammals are listed at p. 122, Table 4.)

Thirty species of mammals were identified in the forest between 1968 and 1972. Common mammalian species included:

- short-tailed shrew
- masked shrew
- red bat
- snowshoe hare
- eastern chipmunk
- least chipmunk
- red squirrel
- woodland deer mouse
- white-footed mouse
- porcupine
- coyote
- red fox
- raccoon
- skunk
- short-tailed weasel
- white-tailed deer

=== Lichens ===
Frederic Erbisch counted 30 species of lichen in the forest in the early 1970s. The most common species within the section chosen for concentrated study included Parmelia olivacea, Parmelia saxatilis, Parmelia sulcata, Physcia orvicularis, and Physcia pulverulanta. (Note: A full list of lichen present at Site 1 is found in Erbisch 1972, pp. 13–14, Table 1.)

== Research ==
Radioecological research on the Enterprise Forest began in 1969 at the behest of the Atomic Energy Commission. A 1,440-acre section was fenced off, and infrastructure was built, including a small control building in the south-east corner. A radiation source was procured which had originally been used in the Puerto Rican rainforest and was recharged at Oak Ridge National Laboratory in Tennessee. The source was 10,000 curies of caesium-137, which decays with a half-life of 33 years and emits gamma radiation. When not in use, it was stored in a lead pig, which encased the source with 6–8 inches (15–20 cm) of lead in all directions. It was set up on a wooden stand roughly 6 feet (1.8 m) tall.

From 1970 to 1974, data was gathered on weather, solar radiation, plant and animal species, nuclear volume, cambial growth, and dosimetry. Woody plant species were measured for radiosensitivity, based on the interphase chromosome volume. In total, 193 plant species in 52 families were studied. Small mammals were also tagged for behavioral observation and studied for radiosensitivity.

=== Findings ===
Many of the results were close to the research team's initial predictions. (Note: A comparison of predictions and results is found at Zavitkovski 1977, p. 203, Table 1.) The study found that the amount of radiation exposure in the Enterprise forest was lower than that of the pine/oak Brookhaven Radiation Forest on Long Island but higher than the rainforest of Puerto Rico, which were subject to similar experimentation; this discrepancy was attributed to the varying complexity of ecosystems. Tree trunks were significant in shielding from exposure. They found that light is a reliable measure of radiation damage, particularly in comparison to precipitation, temperature, and humidity. The radiation damage varied widely by species and location in relation to the radiation source. In the area closest to the source, several species of lichen and some vascular plants survived; the team had predicted that that zone would be totally devastated. Lichen communities were the most resistant to radiation damage, being around 250 times more resistant than coniferous forests. (Note: A comparison of the radiosensitivity of various plant communities is found at Zavitkovski 1977, p. 204, Table 2.)

== See also ==
- Finnerud Forest Scientific Area
- Chernobyl exclusion zone
- Polesie State Radioecological Reserve
