= Toby Roth =

American politician (born 1938)

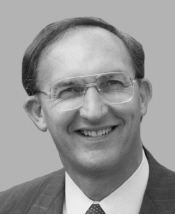

Member of the U.S. House of Representatives from Wisconsin's 8th district
- In office January 3, 1979 – January 3, 1997
- Preceded by: Robert John Cornell
- Succeeded by: Jay W. Johnson

Member of the Wisconsin State Assembly from the 42nd district
- In office January 1, 1973 – January 1, 1979
- Preceded by: Constituency established
- Succeeded by: David Prosser Jr.

Personal details
- Born: Tobias Anton Roth Sr. October 10, 1938 (age 87) Strasburg, North Dakota, U.S.
- Party: Republican
- Spouse: Barbara Fischer (m. 1964)
- Children: 3
- Relatives: Roger Roth (nephew)
- Education: Marquette University (BA)

Military service
- Branch/service: United States Army Reserve
- Years of service: 1962–1967
- Rank: First Lieutenant
- Unit: 44th General Hospital

Tobias Anton Roth Sr. (born October 10, 1938) is a retired American businessman, lobbyist, and Republican politician from Appleton, Wisconsin. He served 18 years in the U.S. House of Representatives, representing Wisconsin's 8th congressional district from 1979 to 1997. He previously served three terms in the Wisconsin State Assembly (1973–1979). His nephew, Roger Roth, was president of the Wisconsin Senate from 2017 to 2021.

== Early life and career ==
Toby Roth was born in Strasburg, North Dakota, in October 1938. During his teenage years, he moved with his family to Menasha, Wisconsin, where he graduated from St. Mary Catholic High School in 1957. He went on to attend Marquette University, where he earned his bachelor's degree in political science in 1961.

After college, Roth went to work as a realtor in Appleton, Wisconsin. He also enlisted in the United States Army Reserve and was assigned to the 44th General Hospital. He rose to the rank of first lieutenant before his discharge in 1967. During those years, he also became involved in several local civic organizations and became active in the local Republican Party.

== Early political career ==
In 1968, Roth made his first run for public office, launching a primary challenge against incumbent Republican state representative Ervin Conradt. Conradt represented Outagamie County's 3rd Assembly district, which then comprised roughly the western half of the county and parts of the city of Appleton. Conradt had run into controversy the year before the election due to his position on municipal annexations by the city of Appleton. Roth, who was 20 years younger than Conradt, campaigned on his youth and bringing new energy to the district. He ultimately fell 841 votes short in the primary, winning the Appleton precincts but losing most of the rest of the district.

Four years later, the Wisconsin Legislature passed a significant redistricting law which scrapped the old county-based Assembly district system. Under the new plan, Roth resided in the 42nd Assembly district, which then comprised nearly all of the city of Appleton. The incumbent living in that district was Harold V. Froehlich, who announced early in 1972 that he would not run in the new Assembly district and would instead run for the U.S. House of Representatives. Roth announced his candidacy for the 42nd Assembly district in April. The Republican primary ultimately attracted three other candidates, 29-year-old former U.S. Department of Justice attorney David Prosser Jr., county supervisor Norman Austin, and 24-year-old John Birch Society sympathizer Neal Wellman. Roth was described as the front runner, as he had the deepest roots in the district at that time. The race ultimately came down to a contest between Prosser and Roth, with Roth prevailing by 1,127 votes. In the general election, Roth easily defeated Democratic candidate Thomas Lonsway. Roth won re-election in 1974 and 1976, serving six years in the Assembly. Republicans were in the minority for all of Roth's years in the Assembly, but he served on the Judiciary committee in 1975 and 1977 when pivotal judicial reform amendments were passed.

== Congress ==
Wisconsin's 8th congressional district 1972–1981

On February 18, 1978, Roth announced he would run for U.S. House of Representatives in Wisconsin's 8th congressional district, challenging incumbent Democrat Robert John Cornell. In his announcement, Roth blasted the U.S. Congress and the Jimmy Carter administration for wasteful spending and over-regulation, and attacked Cornell for voting for an increase in social security payroll taxes, while also voting for a pay increase and maintaining a separate retirement system for members of Congress. The 8th congressional district (then and now) comprised roughly the northeast quadrant of the state.

Roth faced only one opponent in the 1978 Republican primary, former American Party candidate Donald Hoeft. Attorney John W. Byrnes Jr. (son of former U.S. representative John W. Byrnes) briefly ran in the Republican primary but withdrew. Roth easily defeated Hoeft and went on to face Cornell in the general election. In the general election, Roth resumed his attacks on Cornell based largely on Cornell's voting record in Congress. His vote for a congressional pay raise remained a frequent talking point, and Roth also suggested Cornell's votes in favor of government spending were fueling the inflation crisis. Roth won a substantial victory in the general election, receiving 58% of the vote and unseating the incumbent, Cornell.

Roth's first term, in the 96th Congress, was uneventful politically, but both his parents died during his first year. Roth signed onto Jack Kemp's dramatic tax cut proposal, voted against expanding oil drilling in Alaska, and voted against tax increases on oil producers. His most news-making controversy during this term was a story by the Milwaukee Journal Sentinel, which quoted unnamed staffers from Roth's congressional office expressing disillusionment with the amount of time spent on politics and re-election rather than government. The story mentioned that the staff combed through dozens of daily Wisconsin newspapers and sent out clippings with personalized notes from the congressman commending the subjects in those stories. The article was discussed in papers around the state, and led Roth's political opponents to accuse him of obsessing over re-election. Leading the criticism was Roth's 1978 opponent, Robert J. Cornell, who seemed intent on a rematch in 1980. Cornell, who was also a Catholic priest, ultimately withdrew from the race in May 1980, citing Pope John Paul II's order that clergy withdraw from political activity. Instead, Roth faced a challenge from former Green Bay mayor Michael Monfils. Roth easily prevailed in the general election, receiving 68% of the vote.

The 1980 election also ushered in the Ronald Reagan administration. Roth, as a long-time opponent of government regulations, was called on to assist Vice President George H. W. Bush in his study of the impact of the current regulatory regime. Roth's hometown, Appleton, became a prototype for a study by Bush's task force. During the 97th Congress, Roth was also one of two members of Congress invited to discuss the American economy with the European Parliament in Brussels. Roth generally remained in lock-step with the new Reagan administration through tax cuts, regulatory rollbacks, and cuts to domestic spending; he broke with Reagan, however, over cuts to a milk subsidy program which benefited Wisconsin dairy farmers.

Wisconsin's 8th congressional district 1982–1991

In the 1982 election, Roth was challenged by Ruth Clusen, a former Carter administration appointee in the Department of Energy and former national president of the League of Women Voters. Clusen's campaign largely focused on attacks against Reagan's policies and linking Roth to the outcomes. She pointed out that two years of Reaganomics had increased the unemployment rate from 7% to 10% and the budget deficit had increased. Roth doubled down on Reagan's policies, suggesting that deeper cuts were needed. The 1982 election saw a Democratic wave, but Roth still safely won re-election with 57% of the vote.

During the 98th Congress, Roth became more involved in foreign policy through membership on the House Foreign Affairs Committee. He was strongly opposed to U.S. involvement in the Lebanese Civil War; a month before the 1983 Beirut barracks bombings, Roth described the deployment of U.S. Marines in Beirut as a "tragedy waiting to happen". After the bombing, Roth reiterated his position and criticized the Reagan administration for putting the marines in an impossible situation. In the 1984 election, Roth faced Vietnam veteran Paul F. Willems, who served as a campaign manager for Clusen two years earlier. Roth easily won re-election with 67% of the vote.

In the 99th Congress, Roth opposed a new push for sanctions against apartheid South Africa, suggesting the U.S. should offer incentives for reform instead. Roth had also been a long-time supporter of nuclear talks with the Soviet Union and celebrated the progress of the Geneva talks and Mikhail Gorbachev's visit to the United States in 1986. Another major Roth priority was expanding American exports; during the 99th Congress, he authored a successful renewal of the Export Administration Act of 1979, which had lapsed during the previous congress. After the West Berlin discotheque bombing and the Reagan administration's subsequent retaliatory bombing in Libya, Roth criticized the military response and advocated for de-escalation. In the 1986 election, Roth won another easy re-election, defeating Paul Williems by a margin nearly identical to their 1984 matchup.

Following the Iran–Contra scandal, Roth opposed amnesty for Oliver North and John Poindexter. He continued to oppose sanctions against South Africa, and described the sanctions as ineffective after visiting South Africa in 1987. He also continued to oppose intervention in the middle east, criticizing U.S. involvement in the Iran–Iraq War and Reagan's plans to offer U.S. Navy protection for Kuwaiti oil shipping. During the 100th Congress, Wisconsin's senior U.S. senator William Proxmire announced his plan to retire; Roth was frequently mentioned as a potential candidate, but he ultimately chose to remain in the House. Roth easily won his sixth term in 1988, defeating retired mine worker Robert Baron.

During the 101st Congress, Roth's use of congressional resources were scrutinized again, when another former staffer accused the office of abusing his taxpayer-funded congressional staff to bolster his re-election campaigns. The aide also alleged that, at Roth's urging, he used a personal connection to alter Roth's biography in the 1986 edition of The Almanac of American Politics, to describe Roth as "an expert in international trade." Roth denied that he had done anything improper, and not formal complaint was ever raised. In 1990, Roth faced his first contested primary since 1978, but easily defeated police officer David Hermes. At the general election, however, Roth faced the toughest re-election fight of his career against state senator Jerome Van Sistine. In the campaign, Van Sistine made an issue of Roth's use of staff resources for campaigning. He also criticized Roth's opposition to Operation Desert Shield, embracing the Bush administration policy. Van Sistine also pointed to Roth's vote on the 1979 banking deregulation bill as a cause of the recent savings and loan crisis, and suggested Roth's views on the subsequent bailouts were influenced by thousands of dollars he received while serving on the House Banking Committee in the 1980s. Roth prevailed in the election with just 53% of the vote, the closest election of his career.

Roth won two more terms, in 1992 and 1994, with large electoral margins. He served only one term in the majority, during the 104th Congress, when he was chairman of the Subcommittee on International Economic Policy and Trade.

== Later years ==
Roth announced in March 1996 that he would not run for a tenth term. Before leaving office, Roth endorsed Assembly speaker David Prosser Jr. to succeed him and campaigned vigorously to support him in the general election. Prosser won the primary, but ultimately fell 10,000 votes short of Democrat Jay Johnson in the general election. Roth left office in January 1997, and nearly immediately set up his own lobbying shop in Washington, D.C., known as the Roth Group Inc. During those years, he also made his home in Great Falls, Virginia. He also subsequently became an owner of racing horses.

== Personal life and family ==
Tobias Roth was one of five sons born to Kasper Roth and his wife Julia (née Roehrich). Kasper Roth ran a successful construction contracting business in Menasha for over 20 years. The Roths are members of the Catholic Church.

Tobias' elder brother, Joseph Roth, was struck and killed by a car while jogging in 1975. Tobias' younger brother, Roger, went to work with him in the realty business. Roger's son, Roger J. Roth Jr., went on to serve as president of the Wisconsin Senate and ran unsuccessfully for Congress in Wisconsin's 8th congressional district in 2024.

Tobias Roth married Barbara M. Fischer in 1964. They have three adult children, and now spend much of their time in Naples, Florida.

== Electoral history ==
=== Wisconsin Assembly, Outagamie 3rd district (1968) ===
Year	Election	Date	Elected				Defeated				Total	Plurality
1968	Primary	Sep. 10	Ervin Conradt (inc)	Republican	3,930	55.99%	Tobias A. Roth	Rep.	3,089	44.01%	7,019	841

=== Wisconsin Assembly, 42nd district (1972–1976) ===
Year	Election	Date	Elected				Defeated				Total	Plurality
1972	Primary	Sep. 12	Tobias A. Roth	Republican	4,383	53.01%	David Prosser Jr.	Rep.	3,256	39.38%	8,268	1,127
1972	Primary	Sep. 12	Tobias A. Roth	Republican	4,383	53.01%	Norman Austin	Rep.	402	4.86%	8,268	1,127
1972	Primary	Sep. 12	Tobias A. Roth	Republican	4,383	53.01%	Neal W. Wellman	Rep.	227	2.75%	8,268	1,127
1972	General	Nov. 7	Tobias A. Roth	Republican	11,337	67.23%	Thomas Lonsway	Dem.	5,527	32.77%	16,864	5,810
1974	General	Nov. 5	Tobias A. Roth (inc)	Republican	8,669	68.71%	William F. Errington	Dem.	3,708	29.39%	12,617	4,961
1974	General	Nov. 5	Tobias A. Roth (inc)	Republican	8,669	68.71%	John C. Tilley	Amer.	240	1.90%	12,617	4,961
1976	General	Nov. 2	Tobias A. Roth (inc)	Republican	12,595	100.0%	--unopposed--				12,595	12,595

=== U.S. House (1978–1994) ===
Year	Election	Date	Elected				Defeated				Total	Plurality
1978	Primary	Sep. 12	Tobias A. Roth	Republican	29,782	69.16%	Donald Hoeft	Rep.	13,280	30.84%	43,062	16,502
1978	General	Nov. 7	Tobias A. Roth	Republican	101,856	57.94%	Robert J. Cornell (inc)	Dem.	73,925	42.05%	175,791	27,931
1980	General	Nov. 4	Tobias A. Roth (inc)	Republican	169,664	67.67%	Michael Monfils	Dem.	81,043	32.32%	250,726	88,621
1982	General	Nov. 2	Tobias A. Roth (inc)	Republican	101,379	57.23%	Ruth Clusen	Dem.	74,436	42.02%	177,152	26,943
1982	General	Nov. 2	Tobias A. Roth (inc)	Republican	101,379	57.23%	Anthony Theisen	Lib.	1,336	0.75%	177,152	26,943
1984	General	Nov. 6	Tobias A. Roth (inc)	Republican	161,005	67.90%	Paul F. Willems	Dem.	73,090	30.83%	237,107	87,915
1984	General	Nov. 6	Tobias A. Roth (inc)	Republican	161,005	67.90%	Gary L. Barnes	Lib.	2,005	0.85%	237,107	87,915
1984	General	Nov. 6	Tobias A. Roth (inc)	Republican	161,005	67.90%	Cornelius D. Van Handel	L.F.	1,006	0.42%	237,107	87,915
1986	General	Nov. 4	Tobias A. Roth (inc)	Republican	118,162	67.35%	Paul F. Willems	Dem.	57,265	32.64%	175,432	60,897
1988	General	Nov. 8	Tobias A. Roth (inc)	Republican	167,275	69.69%	Robert A. Baron	Dem.	72,708	30.29%	240,013	94,567
1990	Primary	Sep. 11	Tobias A. Roth (inc)	Republican	36,818	78.75%	David J. Hermes	Rep.	9,935	21.25%	46,753	26,883
1990	General	Nov. 6	Tobias A. Roth (inc)	Republican	95,902	53.53%	Jerome Van Sistine	Dem.	83,199	46.44%	179,142	12,703
1992	General	Nov. 3	Tobias A. Roth (inc)	Republican	191,704	70.08%	Catherine L. Helms	Dem.	81,792	29.90%	273,532	109,912
1994	General	Nov. 8	Tobias A. Roth (inc)	Republican	114,319	63.70%	Stan Gruszynski	Dem.	65,065	36.26%	179,460	49,254

U.S. House of Representatives
Preceded by Robert John Cornell	Member of the U.S. House of Representatives from Wisconsin's 8th congressional district 1979–1997	Succeeded by Jay W. Johnson
U.S. order of precedence (ceremonial)
Preceded by Steve King as Former U.S. Representative	Order of precedence of the United States as Former U.S. Representative	Succeeded by Bob Dornan as Former U.S. Representative
