= Whisker Lake Wilderness =

Protected wilderness area in Florence County, Wisconsin

- Whisker Lake
- IUCN category Ib (wilderness area)
- Location within Wisconsin Location within the United States
- Location: Florence, Wisconsin
- Nearest city: Florence, WI
- Coordinates: 45°57′4″N 88°27′18″W
- Area: 7,270 acres (29.4 km^{2})
- Established: 1978
- Governing body: United States Forest Service

The Whisker Lake Wilderness is a 7,270-acre (2,940 ha) tract of protected land in Florence County, Wisconsin, managed by the United States Forest Service. The wilderness is within the boundaries of the Chequamegon–Nicolet National Forest, and is on the border of Michigan and Wisconsin.

== Whisker Lake ==
Whisker Lake has a maximum depth of 6 feet and area of 8 acres (3.2 ha), being 99% made up of muck. The lake is named for the trees at the shoreline of the lake, referred to by locals as "chin whiskers". Whisker Lake is one of 6 small lakes located within the wilderness.

== See also ==
- List of wilderness areas of the United States
