= Blackjack Springs Wilderness =

Wilderness area in Wisconsin, United States

- IUCN category Ib (wilderness area)
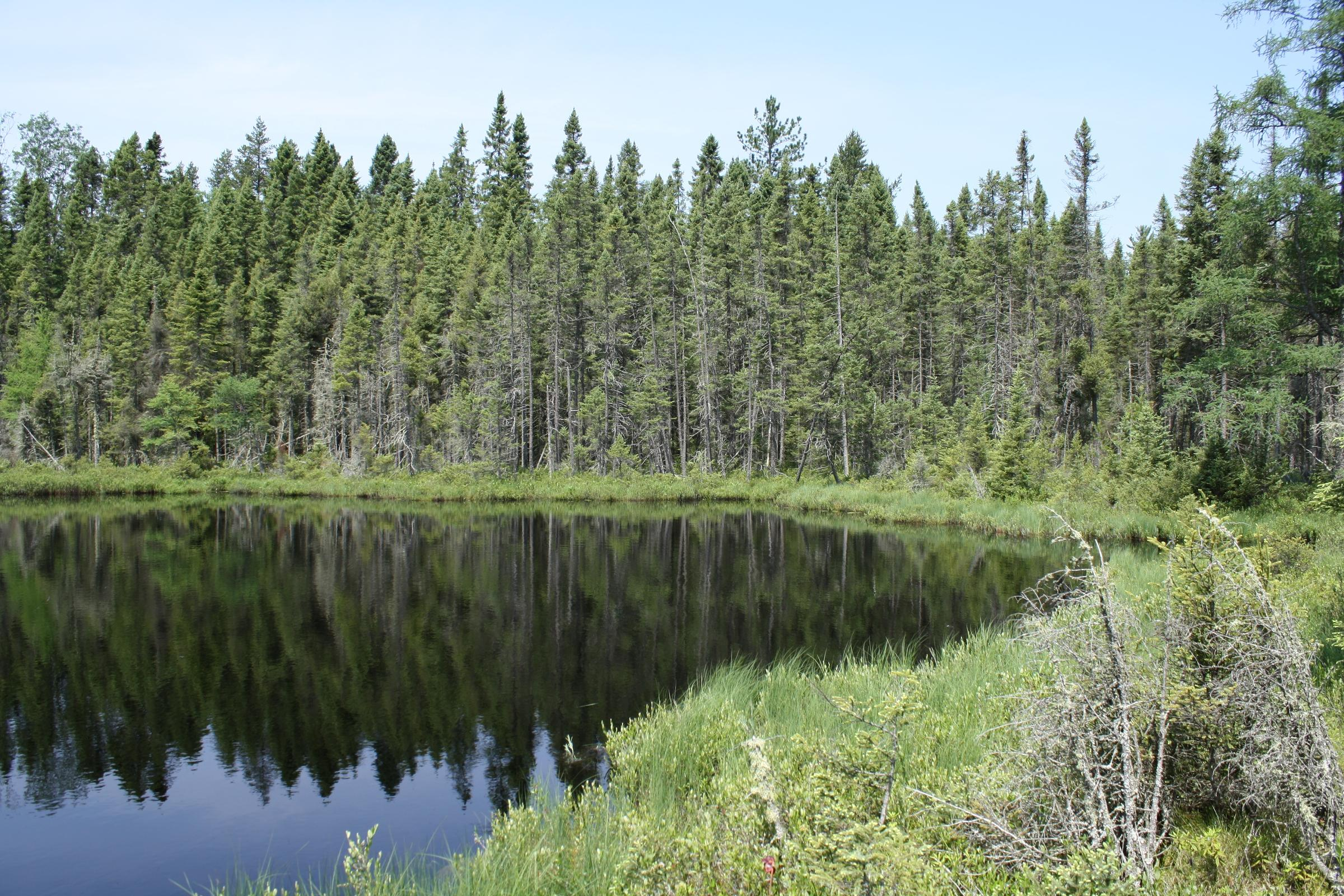
- Whispering Lake, Blackjack Springs Wilderness

- Location within the United States
- Location: Vilas County, Wisconsin, USA
- Nearest city: Eagle River, Wisconsin
- Coordinates: 45.97561°N 89.08782°W
- Area: 5,800 acres (23 km^{2})
- Established: 1978
- Governing body: US Forest Service

The Blackjack Springs Wilderness is a 5,800-acre (23 km^{2}) wilderness area northeast of Eagle River, Wisconsin. It is located within the Nicolet unit of the Chequamegon-Nicolet National Forest and is administered by the US Forest Service. The area protects four large, crystal-clear springs at the headwaters of Blackjack Creek, part of the Eagle River and Wisconsin River drainage. The area was added to the National Wilderness Preservation System by Congress in 1978 as part of the Wisconsin Wilderness Act following an effort spearheaded by Sen. William Proxmire and Rep. Robert John Cornell.

The area displays the rolling, uneven landscape caused by the Wisconsin Glacial Episode, typical of the Lake Superior highlands. The wilderness area itself contains one lake, Whispering Lake, and a number of other streams, ponds, and wetland areas. A majority of the forest is new-growth secondary forest, a result of extensive logging during the late 19th and early 20th centuries. Logging roads and railroad grades are still evident in the area.

Wildlife found in the wilderness area include American black bear, white-tailed deer, ruffed grouse, various songbirds, and fisher.

The Blackjack Springs area provides opportunities for camping, hunting, hiking, canoeing, birdwatching, and fishing.

== See also ==
- Chequamegon-Nicolet National Forest
- List of U.S. Wilderness Areas
- Wilderness Act
