= Headwaters Wilderness =

Wilderness area in Wisconsin, U.S.

- IUCN category Ib (wilderness area)
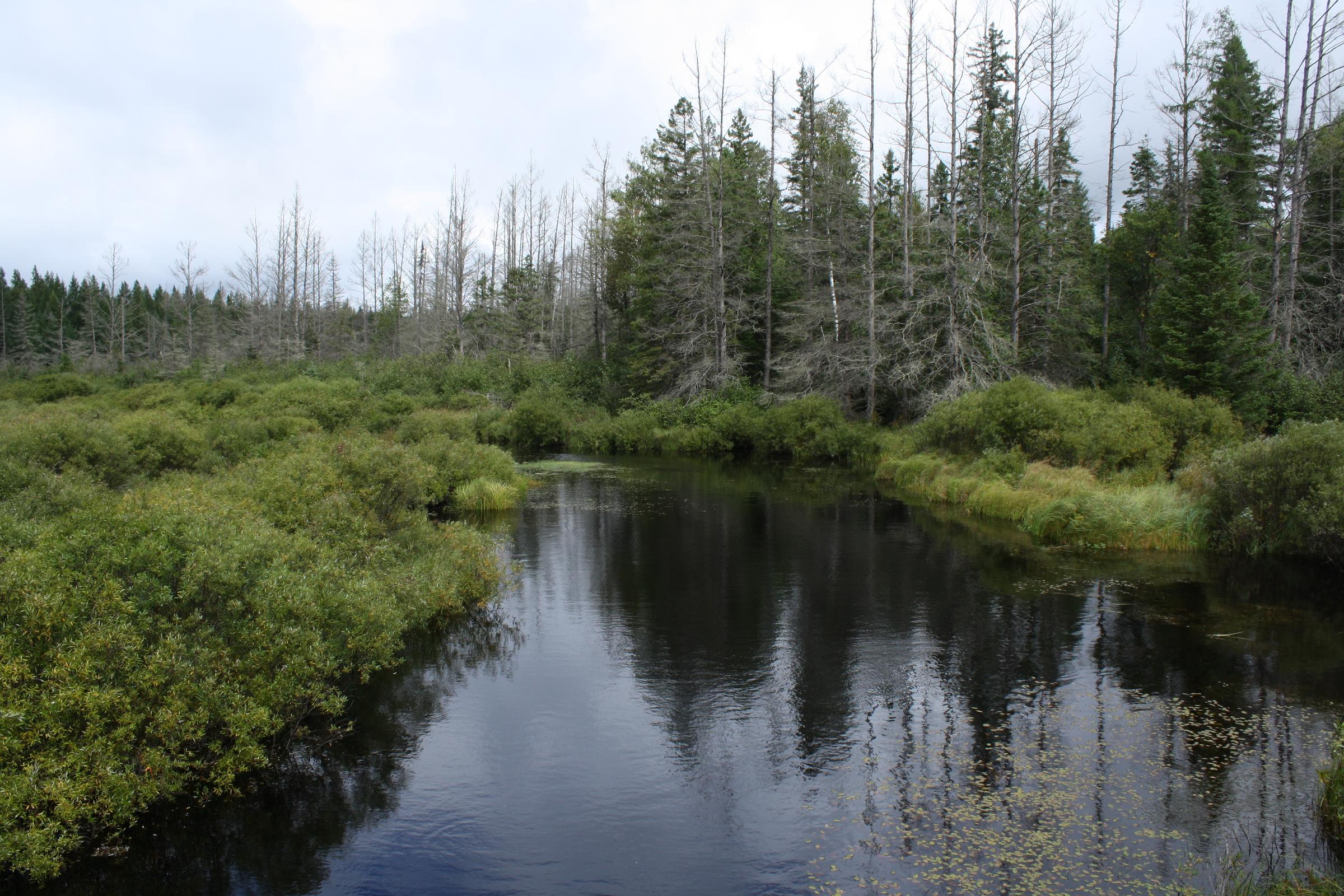
- The Pine River in the Headwaters Wilderness

- Location within the United States
- Location: Forest County, Wisconsin, US
- Nearest city: Eagle River, Wisconsin
- Coordinates: 45.8141258°N 88.9506778°W
- Area: 22,033 acres (89.2 km^{2})
- Established: 1984
- Governing body: United States Forest Service

The Headwaters Wilderness is a 22,033-acre (89 km^{2}) wilderness area located within the Nicolet unit of the Chequamegon–Nicolet National Forest in northeastern Wisconsin. It is the largest federally designated wilderness area on Wisconsin's mainland.

The wilderness area contains the headwaters of the Pine River, a legally protected wild river and a tributary of the Menominee River. The landscape is primarily forested swampland and bogs; the generally flat terrain is covered by pine forest, with some features of northern hardwood forests.

The northern section of the wilderness area contains Kimball Creek, which feeds into the Pine River. In the southwest is the Shelp Lake unit, containing some of the largest and oldest trees in the national forest. In the southeast section features the Pine River, which flows east out of the forest towards the upper peninsula of Michigan.

The Headwaters Wilderness area provides opportunities for hiking, although most trails are primitive and the area contains only a few miles of designated hiking trails. The trails travel past old growth eastern white pine and eastern hemlock, some of Wisconsin's oldest and largest trees. Hunting, fishing, and birdwatching are other popular activities. Several species of bird that are uncommon in Wisconsin can be found in the area including Canada jays, boreal chickadees, and black-backed woodpeckers.

== See also ==
- List of U.S. Wilderness Areas
- Wilderness Act
