= Robert John Cornell =

American priest, professor, and politician (1919–2009)

The Reverend Robert John Cornell O.Praem
- Portrait of Cornell, 1977

Member of the U.S. House of Representatives from Wisconsin's 8th district
- In office January 3, 1975 – January 3, 1979
- Preceded by: Harold Vernon Froehlich
- Succeeded by: Toby Roth

Personal details
- Born: December 16, 1919 Gladstone, Michigan, U.S.
- Died: May 10, 2009 (aged 89) St. Norbert Abbey, De Pere, Wisconsin, U.S.
- Party: Democratic
- Education: St. Norbert College (BA); Catholic University of America (MA, PhD)
- Occupation: Catholic priest; politician; professor
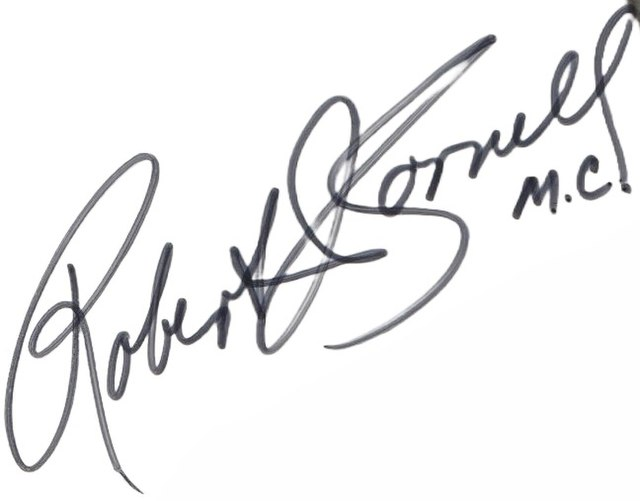
- Signature

Robert John Cornell, O.Praem (December 16, 1919 – May 10, 2009) was an American Catholic priest, professor, and politician who served as a Democratic member of the United States House of Representatives from Wisconsin from 1975 to 1979. He was a member of the Norbertines.

== Early life and education ==
Robert John Cornell was born on December 16, 1919, in Gladstone, Michigan. He attended parochial schools in Green Bay, Wisconsin. He earned his B.A. from St. Norbert College (De Pere, Wisconsin) in 1941 and his M.A. and Ph.D. degrees from The Catholic University of America (CUA) in 1957. He wrote his dissertation on the Coal strike of 1902. On June 17, 1944, he was ordained a priest of the Norbertine Order after six years in the order.

== Priesthood ==
Cornell taught social sciences in parochial schools in Philadelphia, Pennsylvania from 1941 to 1947. He taught at St. Norbert High School, Abbot Pennings High School, and St. Norbert College. He was a professor of history and political science at St. Norbert College from 1947 to 1974, and again from 1979 until 2001.

In the 1960s and 1970s, Cornell organized concerts at the old Brown County Arena (including several that brought Johnny Cash to Green Bay). All proceeds from these concerts benefited local charities.

== Political career ==
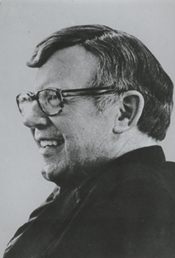
Official congressional portrait of Fr. Cornell

Cornell was the chairman of the Eighth Congressional District of the Democratic Party of Wisconsin and a member of the State Administrative Committee of the Democratic Party of Wisconsin from 1969 to 1974.

He first became involved in partisan politics in 1961 after a local group of affluent Catholic laypeople in Green Bay panned a speech he gave on the importance of promoting social justice. He later wrote in his memoir: "After that incident I decided that speaking or teaching about issues of social justice and human rights would not be sufficient. These stalwarts of the Church obviously felt that matters of self-interest took precedence. I decided that only by advocating public policy was there a hope of making needed changes." After unsuccessful congressional runs in 1970 and 1972, Cornell was elected as a member of the Democratic Party from Wisconsin's 8th congressional district in 1974 to the 94th United States Congress, defeating freshman Republican Harold Vernon Froehlich to become the first Democrat to represent this district in 30 years, and only the fourth to represent this district or its predecessors (it was the 9th District prior to 1933) in the 20th century. He secured the Democratic nomination after defeating Brown County District Attorney (and now Judge) Donald Zuidmulder with 55% of the primary vote. He was reelected with a reduced margin in 1976 to the 95th Congress, becoming the first Democrat to win a second term in what is now the 8th in 62 years. However, he lost to State Representative Toby Roth in 1978 in a bid for the 96th Congress. The Congressional Quarterly Weekly Report (November 18, 1978) reported: "An extremely low turnout among Democratic voters and a strong Republican gubernatorial candidate [Lee S. Dreyfus] were key points in defeat of Robert J. Cornell."

While in Congress, Cornell served on the United States House Committee on Education and Labor and the United States House Committee on Veterans' Affairs. In 1978, he worked alongside Sen. William Proxmire to secure passage of the Wisconsin Wilderness Act, which added Whisker Lake and Blackjack Springs Wilderness to the Chequamegon–Nicolet National Forest. Cornell had a very pro-life record in congress, opposing abortion in all stages and situations, with strong support for the Hyde Amendment.

In 1980, he decided to seek a rematch against Roth, but abandoned his bid when the Vatican ordered all priests to withdraw from politics. He was the second (after Father Robert Drinan) of only two Catholic priests to serve as a voting representative in the United States Congress.

== Later life ==
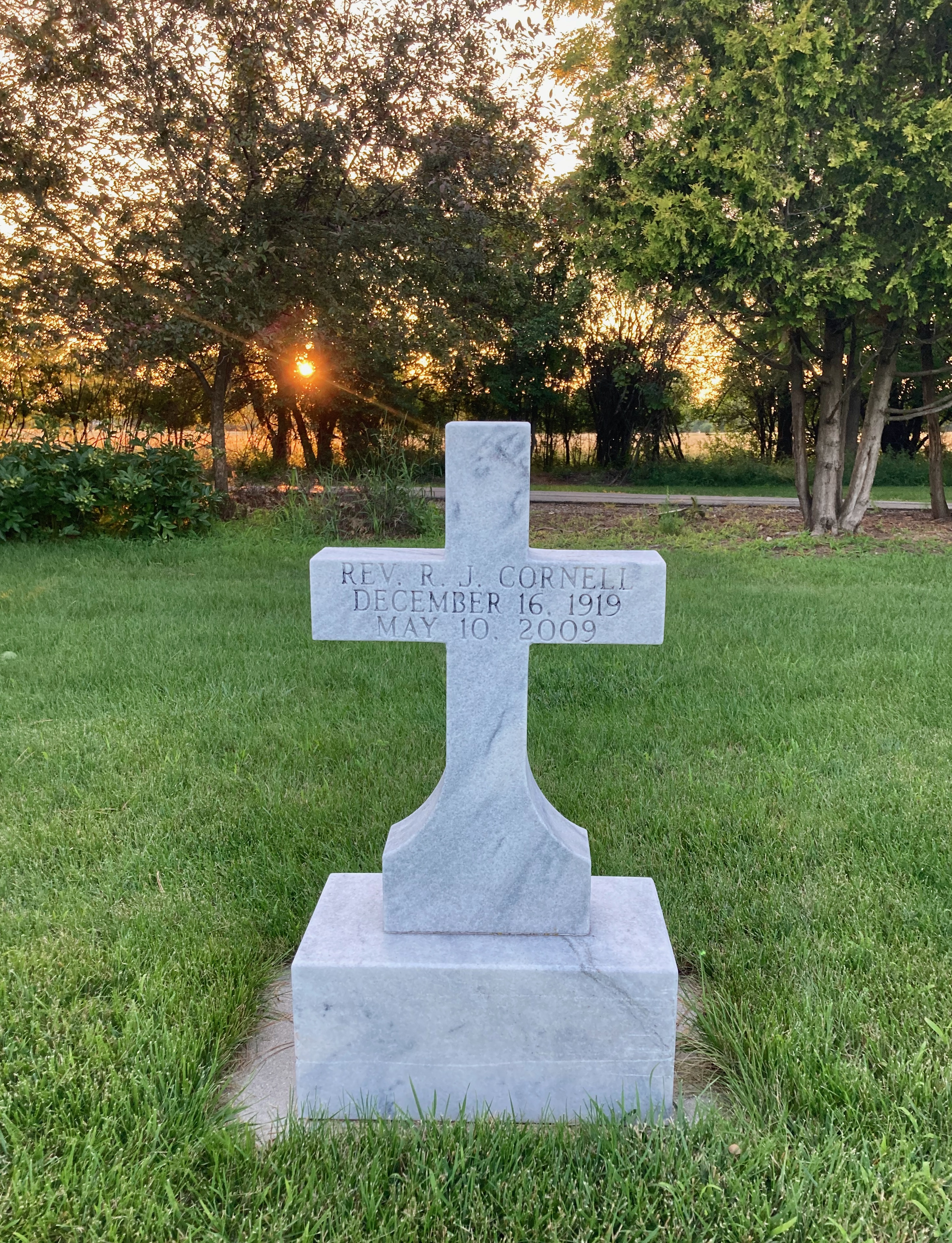
Fr. Cornell's grave at St. Norbert Abbey in De Pere

Later in his life, Cornell self-published a memoir entitled Is There A Priest In The House?. The memoir provides an overview of his political career. He focuses primarily on this time in Congress, and discusses many of the issues that he worked on during his tenure. It also includes many witty anecdotes that capture the dry sense of humor that he was known for.

Cornell lived in De Pere, Wisconsin, until his death at the age of 89 in 2009. He is buried on the grounds of St. Norbert Abbey.

U.S. House of Representatives
Preceded by Harold Vernon Froehlich	Member of the U.S. House of Representatives from Wisconsin's 8th congressional district January 3, 1975 – January 3, 1979	Succeeded by Toby Roth
