= Franklin Lake Campground =

- U.S. National Register of Historic Places
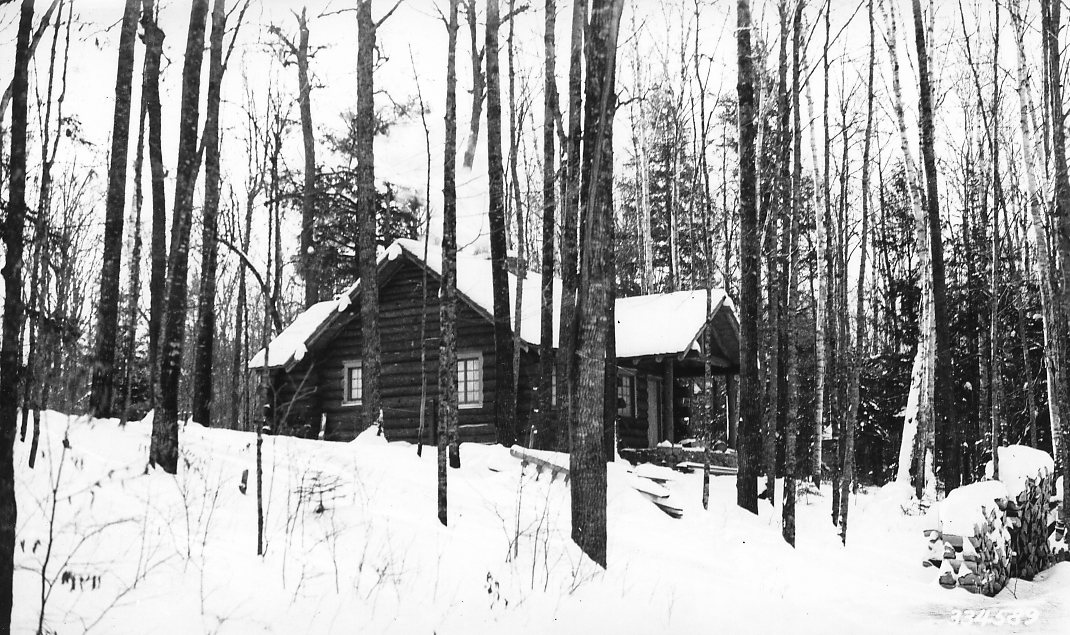
- Caretaker's lodge in 1937

- Location within Wisconsin
- Location: National Forest Rd. 2181; Alvin, Wisconsin
- Coordinates: 45°55′51″N 88°59′37″W
- NRHP reference No.: 88001573
- Added to NRHP: September 28, 1988

The Franklin Lake Campground is located in Hiles, Wisconsin. It was added to the National Register of Historic Places in 1988.

== History ==
The campground was put together by the Civilian Conservation Corps and the Works Progress Administration of the New Deal in 1936. It is located within the Chequamegon-Nicolet National Forest.

During the winter of 1935–1936, three men (Frank Haubry, E. A. Herbes, and Mr. Weir) used snowshoes to survey and mark out the site of what is now Franklin Lake Campground.

The campground opened in 1937 with 12 campsites. By the 1970s, it had expanded to its present capacity of 77 sites.

The campground has 77 campsites, four hiking trails (Nature Trail, Lake View Trail, Sunfish Trail, and Hidden Lakes), two picnic shelters, a boat launch, a beach, and an interpretive center. Franklin Lake Campground contains the largest grouping of Rustic-style buildings in Wisconsin's Nicolet National Forest area, which remains largely unaltered.

The campground is generally open from May through October.
