= Avoca River-Bottom Prairie =

Prairie and state natural area in Iowa County, Wisconsin, United States of America

- Avoca Prairie and Savanna
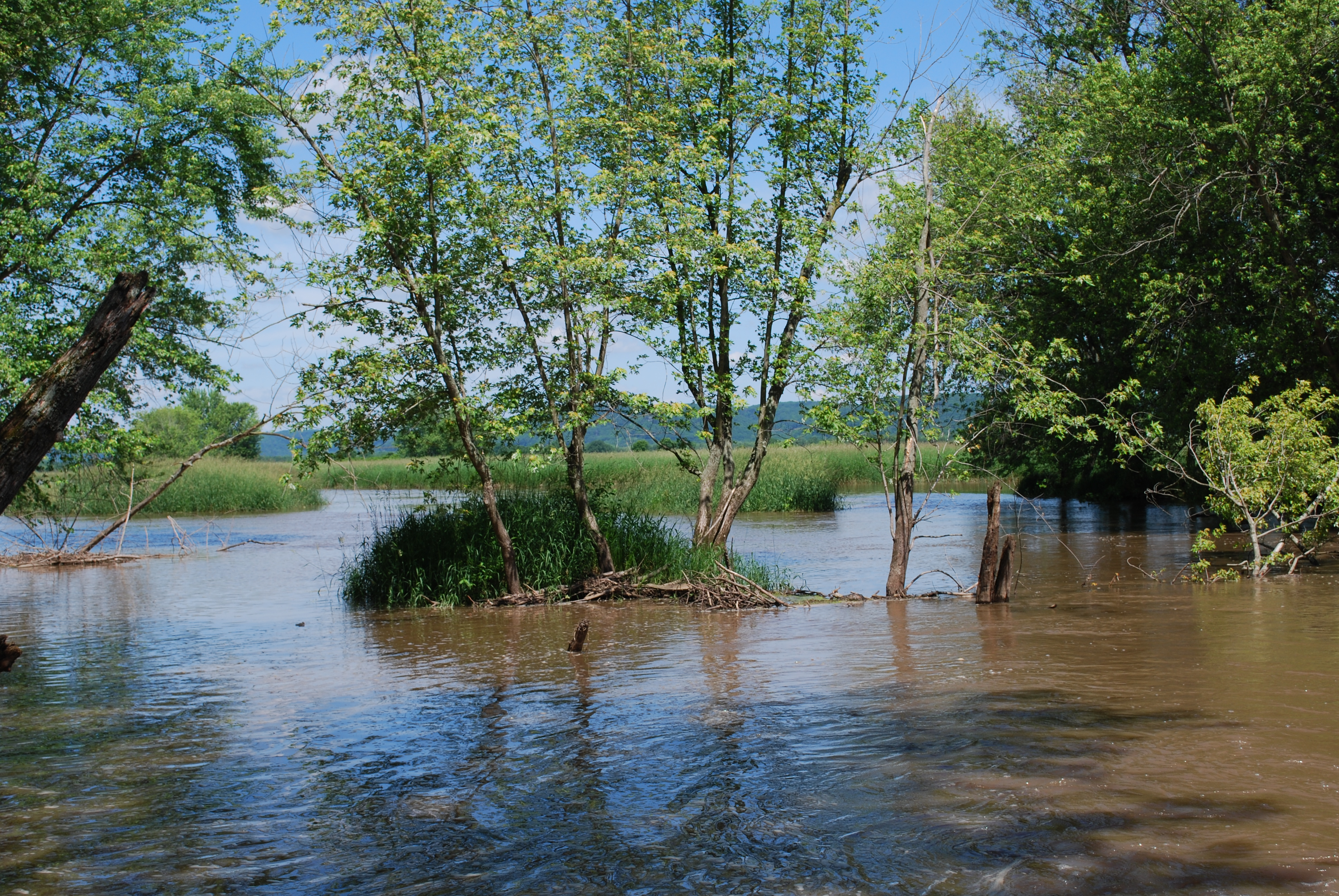
- Avoca River-Bottom Prairie, June 2009

- Location within Wisconsin
- Location: Iowa County, Wisconsin
- Nearest city: Avoca
- Coordinates: 43°12′03″N 90°18′17″W
- Area: 1,885 acres (763 ha)
- Established: 1968
- Website: dnr.wi.gov/topic/Lands/naturalareas/index.asp?SNA=68

U.S. National Natural Landmark
- Designated: 1980

Avoca River-Bottom Prairie or Avoca Prairie and Savanna is an 1,885-acre (763 ha) prairie in Iowa County, Wisconsin just north of Avoca on the Wisconsin River. It is the largest intact prairie in Wisconsin and was designated a state natural area in 1968 and a National Natural Landmark in 1980.
