= Moquah Barrens Research Natural Area =

State Research Natural Area in Wisconsin

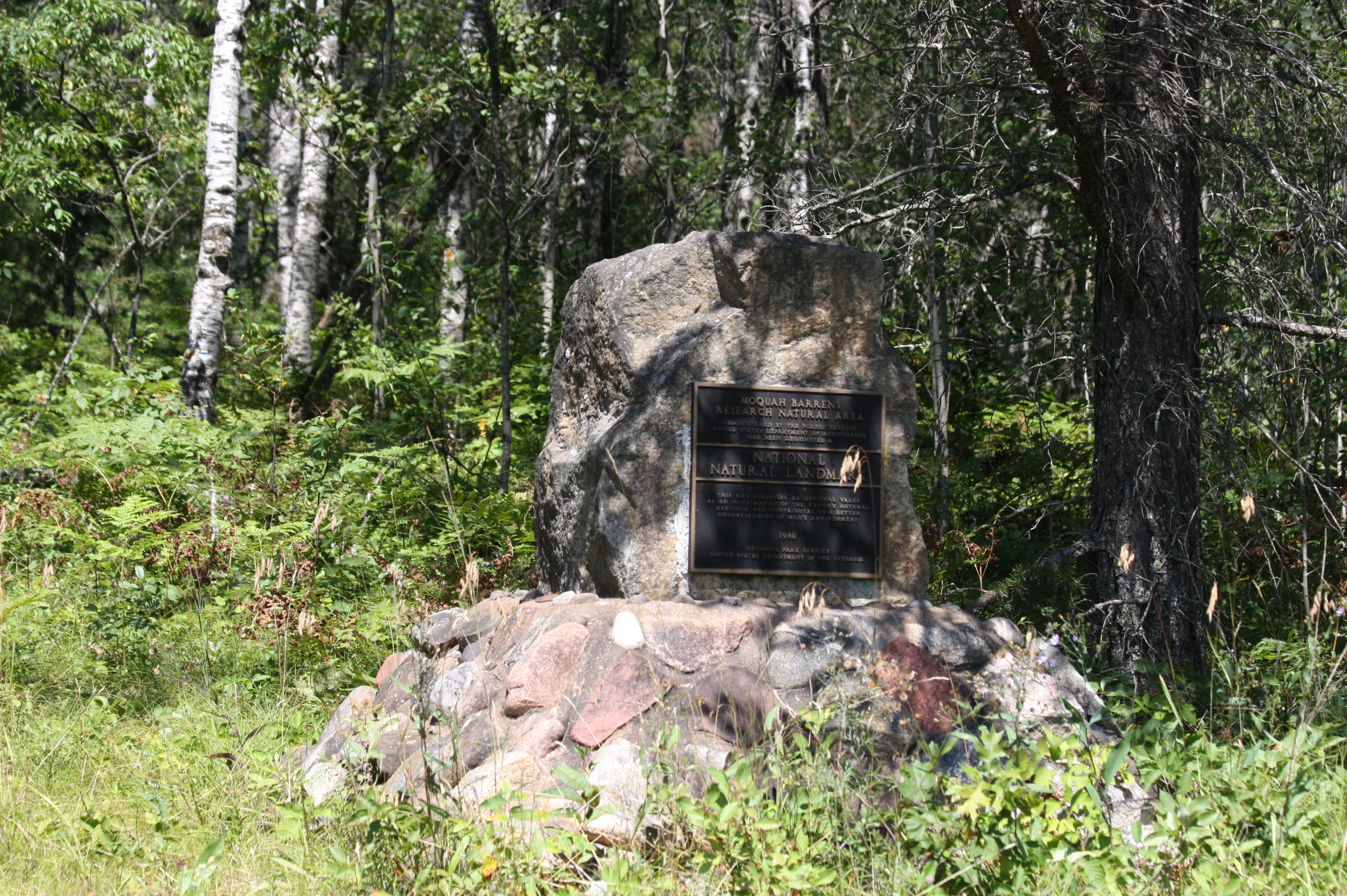
- Sign and forest

- Location within Wisconsin
- Location: Bayfield County, Wisconsin
- Coordinates: 46°37′35″N 91°15′00″W
- Area: 636 acres (257 ha)

U.S. National Natural Landmark
- Designated: 1980

Moquah Barrens Research Natural Area is a 636-acre (257 ha) area of pine barrens in Bayfield County, Wisconsin. It is located within the Chequamegon-Nicolet National Forest. The area was designated a Wisconsin State Natural Area in 1970 and a National Natural Landmark in 1980.

The source of the Flag River is located within the northwest corner of the natural area.
