= Bose Lake Hemlock Hardwoods =

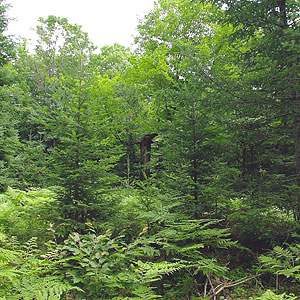
- Bose Lake Hemlock Hardwoods

- Location within Wisconsin
- Location: Forest County, Wisconsin
- Coordinates: 45°55′56″N 88°58′19″W

U.S. National Natural Landmark
- Designated: 1980

Bose Lake Hemlock Hardwoods is a mature northern hardwood-hemlock stand located within Chequamegon-Nicolet National Forest in Oneida County, Wisconsin. It was designated a National Natural Landmark in 1980. Additionally, it is located within the Franklin and Butternut Lakes Wisconsin State Natural Area.
