= Chequamegon–Nicolet National Forest =

Nature preserve in Wisconsin, U.S.

- IUCN category VI (protected area with sustainable use of natural resources)
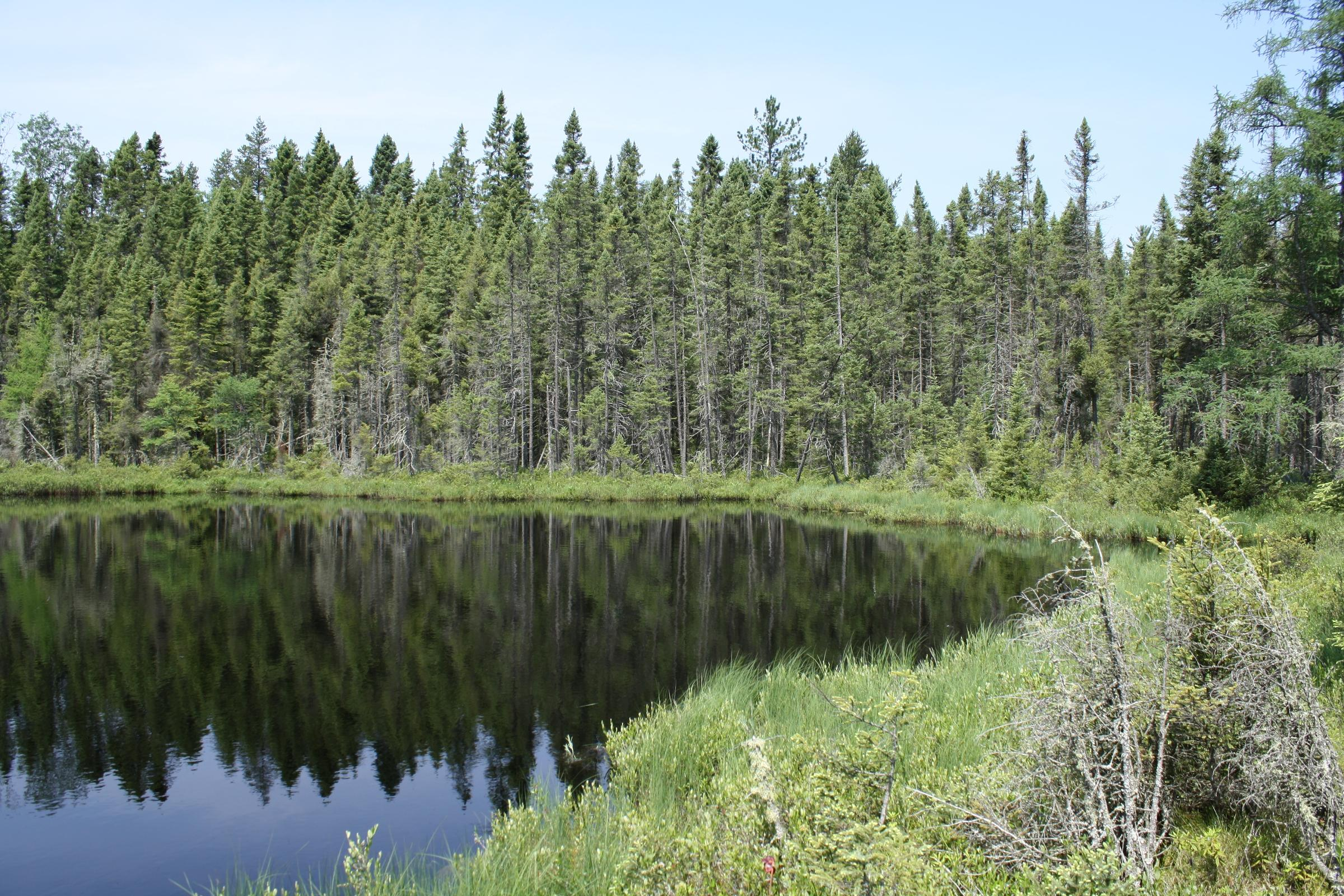
- Blackjack Springs Wilderness in the Nicolet National Forest
- Interactive map of Chequamegon–Nicolet National Forest
- Location: Wisconsin, United States
- Area: 1,534,225 acres (6,208.79 km^{2})
- Established: 1933
- Governing body: U.S. Forest Service
- Website: Chequamegon–Nicolet National Forest

The Chequamegon–Nicolet National Forest (/ʃɪˈwɑːmɪɡən ˌnɪkəˈleɪ/; the q is silent) is a 1,530,647-acre (6,194.31 km^{2}) U.S. National Forest in northern Wisconsin in the United States. Legally two separate national forests—the Chequamegon National Forest and the Nicolet National Forest—the areas were established by presidential proclamations in 1933 and have been managed as one unit since 1998. The national forest's land, trees and vegetation are part of the North Woods ecoregion that prevails throughout the upper Great Lakes region. Little old-growth forest remains due to logging in the early part of the 20th century, and some of the second-growth forest was planted by the Civilian Conservation Corps in the 1930s.

The Chequamegon National Forest comprises three units in the north-central part of the state totaling 865,825 acres (3,503.87 km^{2}). In descending order of forestland area, it is located in parts of Bayfield, Ashland, Price, Sawyer, Taylor, and Vilas counties. Forest headquarters are in Park Falls. There are local ranger district offices in Glidden, Hayward, Medford, Park Falls, and Washburn. Moquah Barrens Research Natural Area is located with the Chequamegon. Lying within the Chequamegon are two officially designated wilderness areas of the National Wilderness Preservation System. These are the Porcupine Lake Wilderness and the Rainbow Lake Wilderness.

The Nicolet National Forest covers 664,822 acres (2,690.44 km^{2}) of northeastern Wisconsin. It is located in parts of Forest, Oconto, Florence, Vilas, Langlade, and Oneida counties. The forest headquarters are in Rhinelander. There are local ranger district offices in Eagle River, Florence, Lakewood, and Laona. Bose Lake Hemlock Hardwoods and the Franklin Lake Campground are located in the Nicolet. Lying within the Nicolet are three wildernesses—the Blackjack Springs Wilderness, the Headwaters Wilderness, and the Whisker Lake Wilderness.

== History ==
Cathedral Pines is a 40-acre grove of never-cut forest in the Nicolet section east of Antigo

Before settlement and logging, much of northern Wisconsin was covered by a vast forest that had developed over thousands of years, since the last glacier backed out of the area. The trees were a mix of conifers and hardwoods, and some were big, having grown unmolested for over 300 years. After the Ojibwe were forced to cede most of their rights to this northern wilderness in the White Pine Treaty of 1837, the U.S. surveyed the land and began to sell it off to speculators and lumber companies.

In the mid-1800s Midwest cities like Chicago were growing, needing lumber to construct houses and stores. Farmers spreading out onto the prairies of Illinois and Iowa needed lumber for houses and barns. The scraps of forest near those markets were soon exhausted. Enterprising men saw that the vast forests of northern Wisconsin, Michigan and Minnesota could supply the growing need for lumber. There were no highways or railways to bring lumber out of those northern forests then, but many rivers flowed south toward the lumber markets. The potential profits were great, and the lumber companies rushed in, chopping their way up the rivers and streams and floating out the most-prized pine, then building logging railroads to haul out the hardwoods and the pine that grew further from streams.

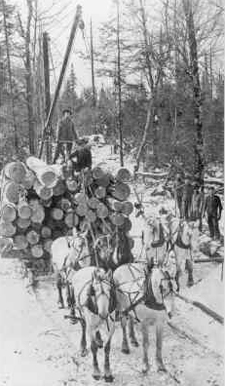
Hauling logs in western Taylor County, 1909

As early as the 1860s some warned that Wisconsin's forests would run out, but the loggers kept on cutting. By 1900 pine timber was dwindling. In 1909 the state forester reported that 45 to 95% of Wisconsin's ten northern counties was cut over, and the pine had been logged from much of the rest. The following year Wisconsin was importing lumber.

That first cycle of logging had left behind a wasteland of stumps, tops and brush. The tops dried out and wildfires ripped across the cutover, threatening the remaining trees and settlers. The Peshtigo Fire of 1871 was the biggest, burning over 1.28 million acres and taking over 1,200 lives, but there were many fires, with over 100,000 acres burned in Wisconsin in 1880, 1897, 1908, 1909, 1923 and 1925. Lumber companies didn't replant trees at that time, pinning their hopes on natural regeneration. Some of the fires killed seedlings and even burned hot enough to scorch the earth. But fire wasn't the only problem.

With the timber cut off, some lumber companies failed to pay property taxes on their land. They sold many forties to hopeful settlers, who tried to scratch out farms. Some succeeded, but many eventually failed - especially farther north - because of poor soils, the reduced growing season, and the long distance to markets. By 1927, about 25% of northern Wisconsin was tax delinquent. Another problem for local governments was that some aspiring pioneer would buy a cheap forty out in some marginal boondocks, which obliged the township to provide a road to his vicinity, and schooling if he had children. Then once that infrastructure was provided, the lone settler might give up on that location and move on. All of these problems drove an interest in government-level management of some of the cutover lands, even though it might mean loss of property taxes.

Federal forest reserves (later named National Forests) were first allowed in the U.S. with the Forest Reserve Act of 1891, which let the President set aside forest from land already publicly owned. That year President Harrison created the first reserve - Yellowstone Timberland Reserve in Wyoming. Others followed. But north Wisconsin's cutover lands were mostly privately owned - not in the public domain. The federal government passed the Weeks Act in 1911, which allowed the Secretary of Agriculture to "...purchase such forested, cutover, or denuded lands within the watersheds of navigable streams as in his judgment may be necessary to the regulation of the flow of navigable streams or for the production of timber." But Wisconsin law still blocked federal ownership of forests until 1925, when a particularly bad batch of spring wildfires was put out only by rain. With that, the state passed its own Forest Enabling Act, which allowed the federal government to own and administer Wisconsin land as national forests.

With that legal framework in place, and with the approval of county boards, the federal government began buying certain lands in northern Wisconsin. This was around the same time that state and county forests were taking shape, mostly carved out of the same cutover. The Nicolet N.F. was established March 2, 1933 by proclamation of President Herbert Hoover, with its headquarters at Rhinelander. The Chequamegon N.F. was split out from the Nicolet November 13, 1933, by President Franklin D. Roosevelt, with its headquarters at Park Falls. While the goal of a national park in the U.S. is primarily preservation of a pristine area, the goals of national forests like Chequamegon and Nicolet - laid out in the Organic Act of 1897 - are more complex and more pragmatic, including timber production and recreation along with resource preservation.

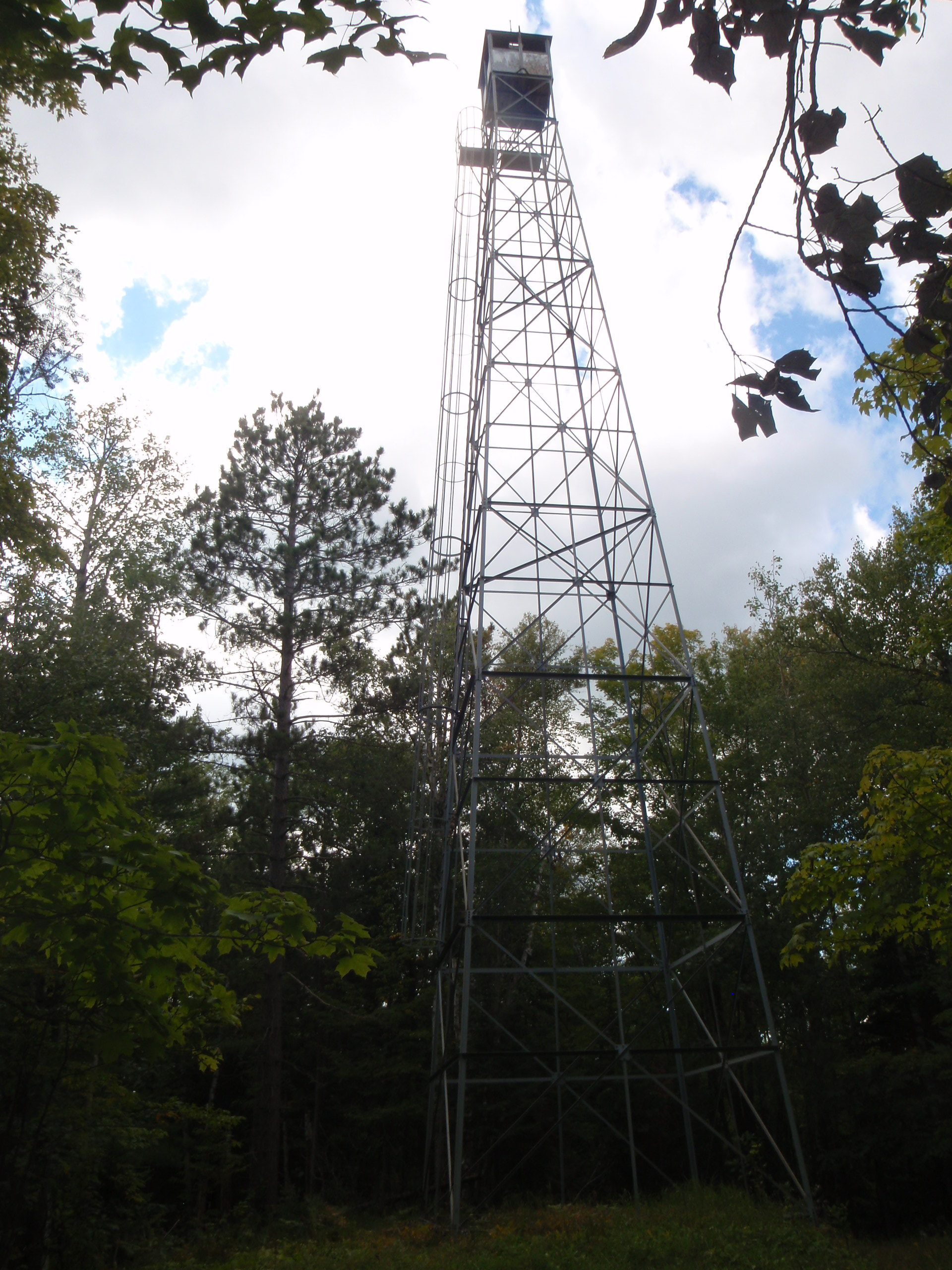
The Fifield Fire Lookout Tower was built by the U.S. Forest Service in 1932 and operated by CCC Camp Riley Creek from around 1935 to 1941. Fire-spotters manned the tower until 1957.

During the Great Depression of the 1930s the Civilian Conservation Corps, guided by the Forest Service, worked at many places in the Chequamegon and Nicolet forests. They built fire lanes, fought fires, and replanted thousands of acres of the cutover with red pine, white pine, jack pine, and white spruce seedlings raised at the Forest Service's Rhinelander nursery. They built recreational facilities like Mondeaux Dam Recreation Area to strengthen the local service economy. These CCC camps were in the Chequamegon Forest:

- Camp Beaver, Clam Lake
- Camp Brinks, Washburn
- Camp Cable, Cable
- Camp Chippewa River, Loretta
- Camp Clam Lake, Clam Lake
- Camp Delta, Delta
- Camp Drummond, Drummond
- Camp Ghost Creek, Hayward
- Camp Horseshoe, Moquah
- Camp Jump River, Jump River
- Camp Loretta, Loretta
- Camp Mineral Lake, Marengo

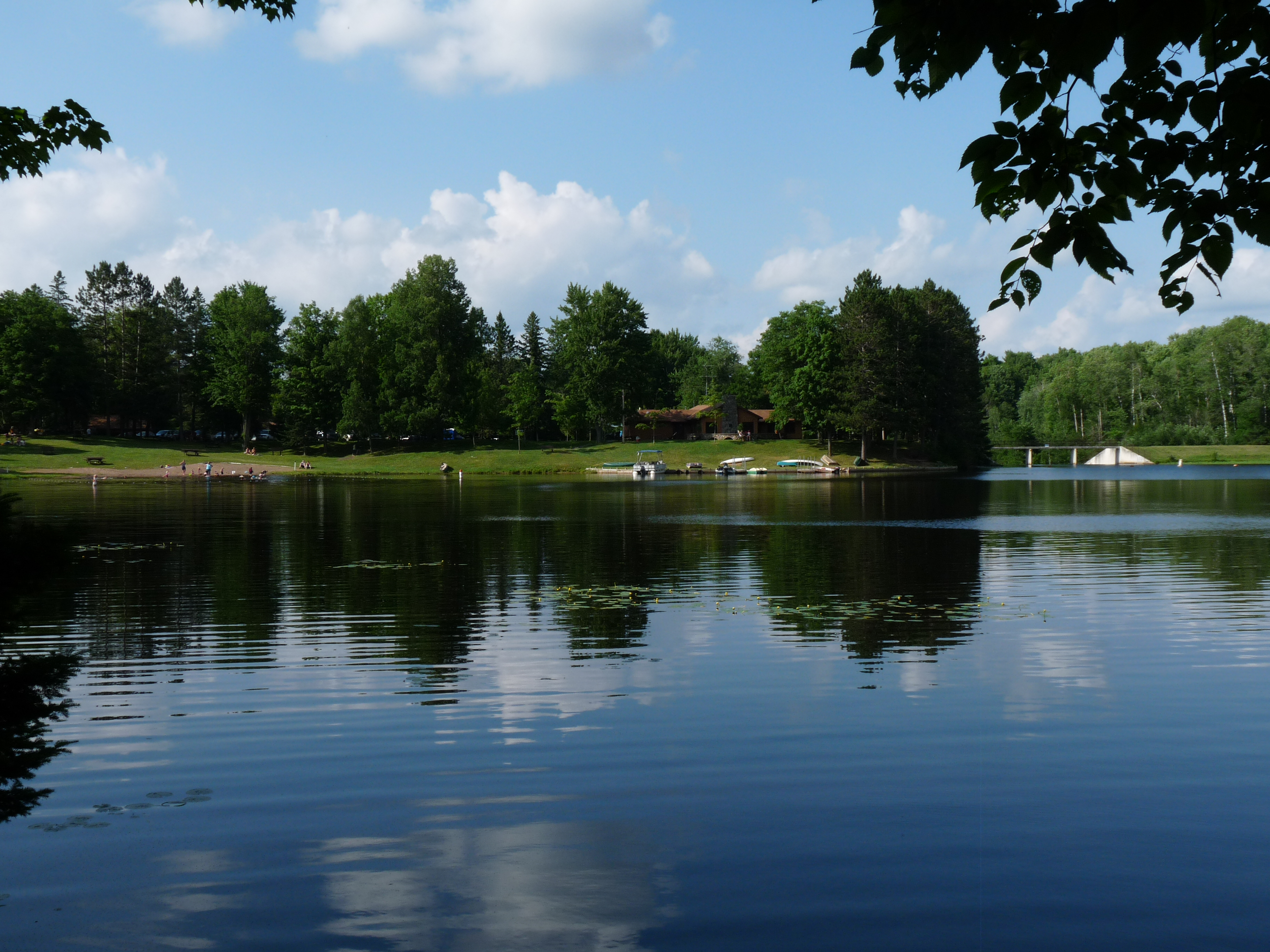
The Mondeaux Dam Recreation Area was developed from 1933 to 1938 by CCC Camp Mondeaux River and the Forest Service with Works Progress Administration help.

- Camp Mondeaux River, Westboro
- Camp Moose River, Glidden
- Camp Morse, Morse
- Camp Perkinstown, Perkinstown
- Camp Pigeon Lake, Drummond
- Camp Riley Creek, Fifield
- Camp Sawyer, Winter
- Camp Sheep Ranch, Phillips
- Camp Taylor Lake, Grandview

And these were the camps in the Nicolet Forest:

- Camp Alvin, Alvin
- Camp Bear Paw, Mountain
- Camp Blackwell, Laona
- Camp Boot Lake, Townsend
- Camp Cavour, Laona
- Camp Double Bend, Newald
- Camp Dream, Florence
- Camp Himley Lake, Wabeno
- Camp Lakewood, Lakewood
- Camp Lily Pad, Phelps
- Camp Long Lake, Long Lake
- Camp Mountain, Mountain
- Camp Newald, Newald

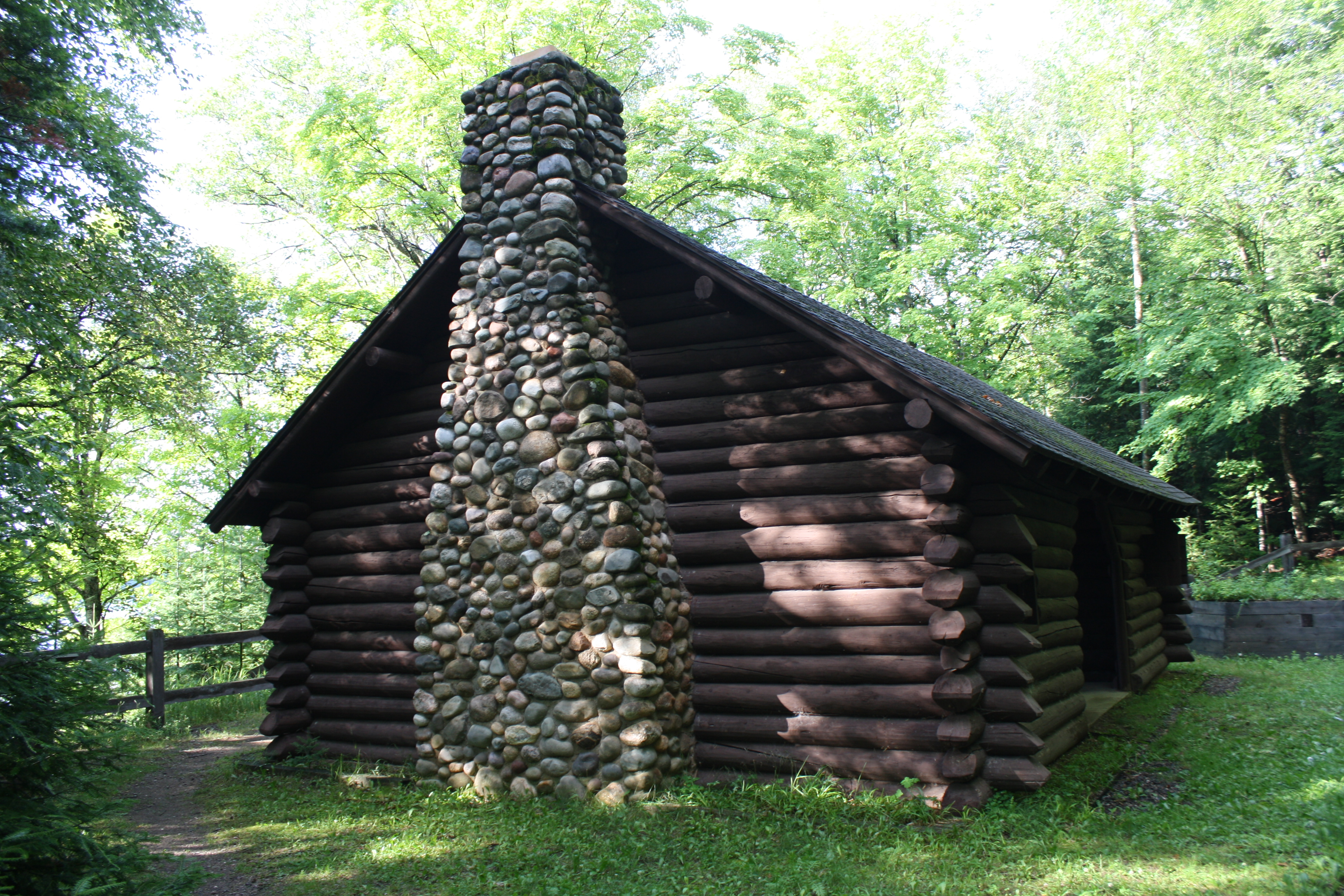
The Anvil Lake Campground was built by CCC Camp Nine Mile and probably the nearby Camp Imogene, a relief camp for transients.

- Camp Nine Mile, Eagle River
- Camp Phelps, Phelps
- Camp Pine River, Three Lakes
- Camp Rainbow, Florence
- Camp Scott Lake, Three Lakes
- Camp Section Eleven, Townsend
- Camp Thunder River, Lakewood
- Camp Trump Lake, Wabeno
- Camp Virgin Lake, Three Lakes
- Camp Wolf River, Lakewood

Since 1993 the two forests have been managed as one, with its headquarters in both Park Falls and Rhinelander. As a result of replanting and fire prevention, the cutover has been transformed to sustainable second-growth, producing forest products and providing jobs and recreation opportunities.

== Flora, fauna, and funga ==
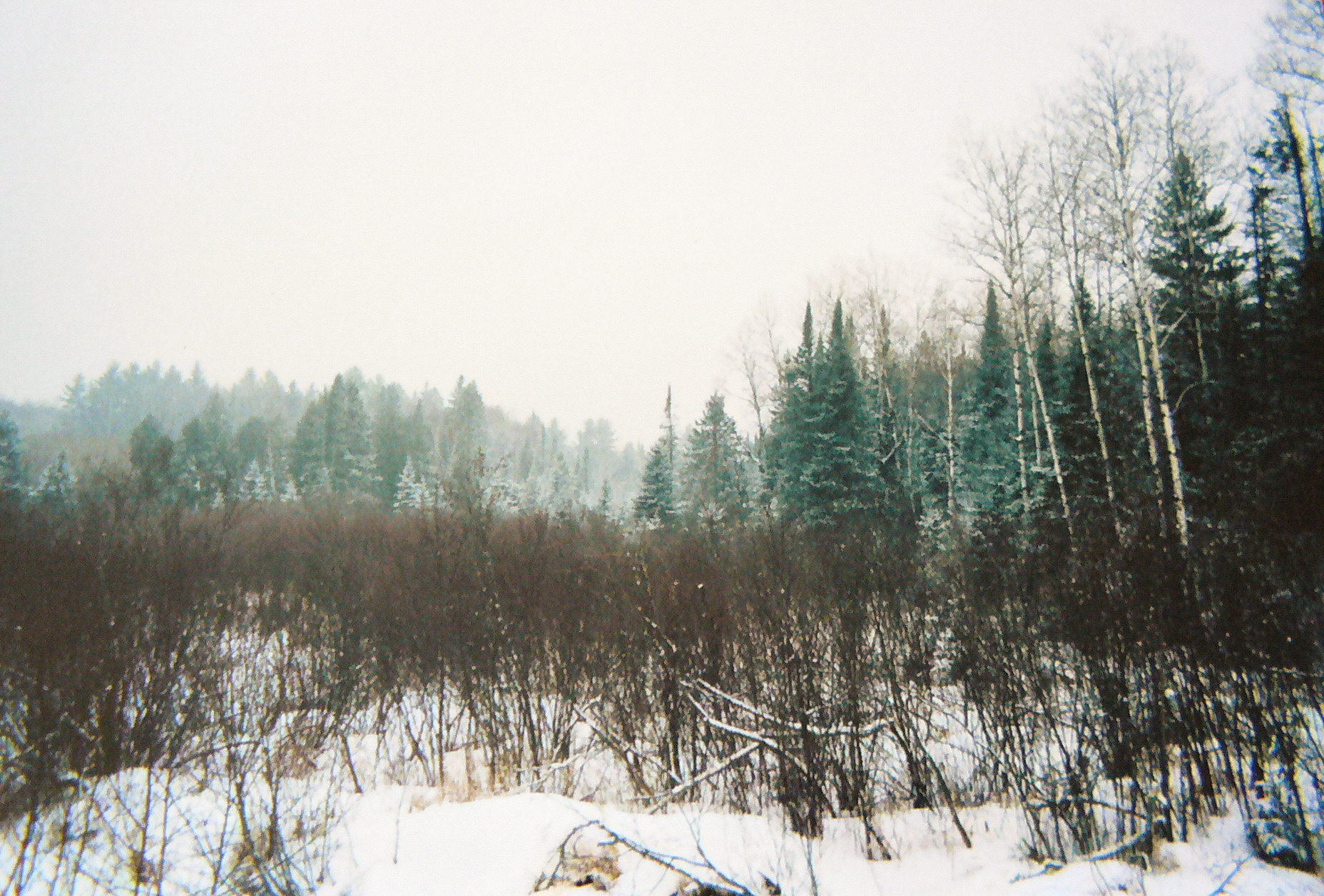
A wintry scene in Chequamegon–Nicolet National Forest

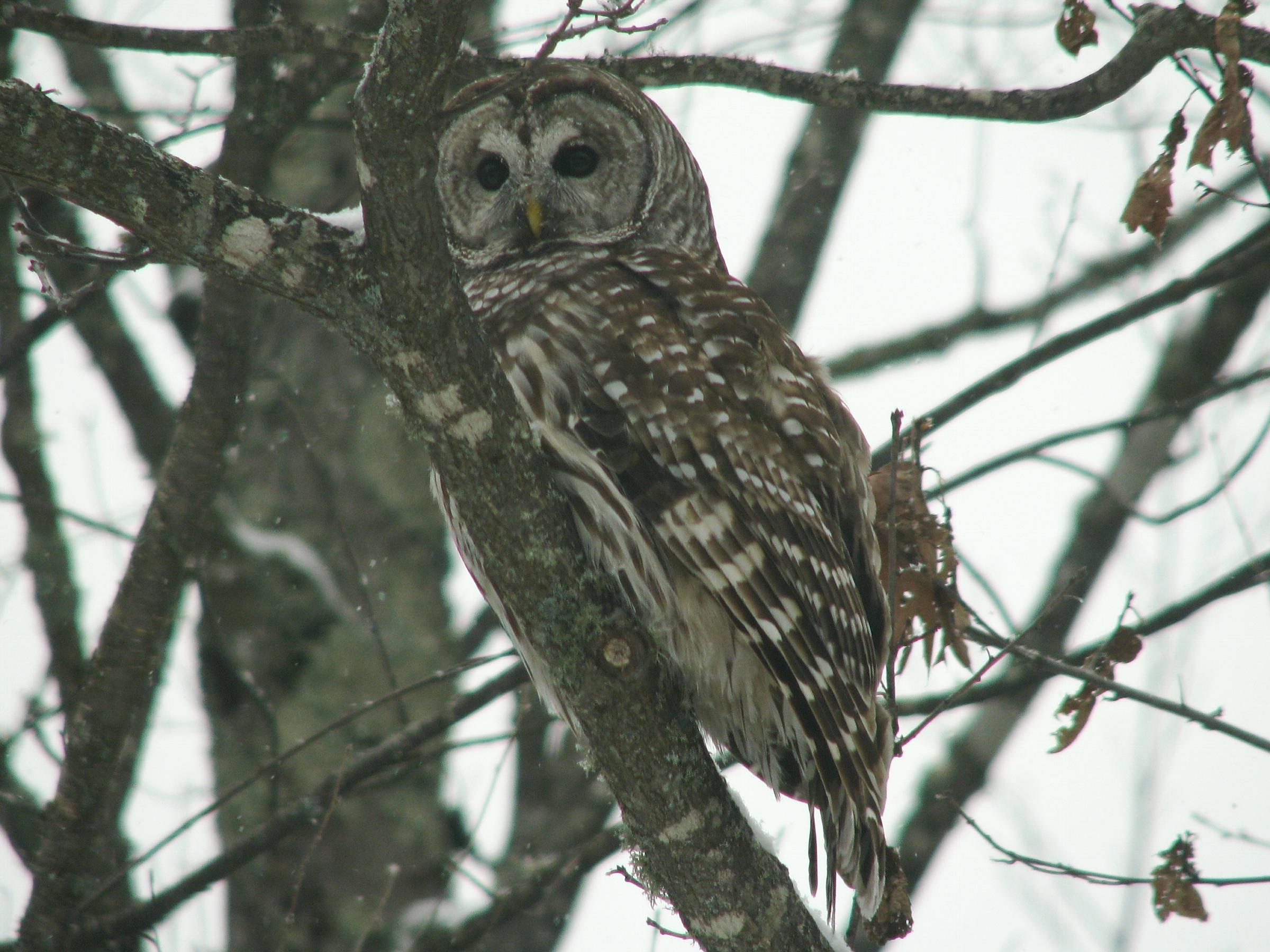
A barred owl along a highway in the Nicolet National Forest

Remote areas of uplands, bogs, wetlands, muskegs, rivers, streams, pine savannas, meadows and many glacial lakes are found throughout these forests. Native tree species include Acer saccharum (sugar maple), Acer rubrum (red maple), and Acer spicatum (mountain maple), white, red, and black oaks, aspen, beech, basswood, sumac, and paper, yellow, and river birch. Coniferous trees, including red, white, and jack pine, white spruce and balsam fir are abundant due to a dense second growth. Eastern hemlock are also present as this is the westernmost limit of its distribution. Tamarack/black spruce bogs, cedar swamps and alder thickets are common. Blueberries, raspberries, blackberries, cranberries, serviceberries, ferns, mosses, cattails, and mushrooms also grow here, as well as many more shrubs and wildflowers.

White-tailed deer are numerous and are hit by motorists on roads in northern Wisconsin year-round. Black bears, foxes, raccoons, rabbits, beavers, river otters, squirrels, chipmunks, pheasants, grouse and wild turkeys are popular game in the woods. Wolves have returned to the area since being protected in the 1970s, after being wiped out earlier in the century. Elk have been reintroduced and there have been sightings of moose and pine marten. Bird species include northern cardinal, blue jay, Canada jay, common raven, boreal and black-capped chickadees, black-backed and pileated woodpeckers, red-winged blackbirds, owls, ducks, common loons, bald eagles, evening grosbeaks, red and white-winged crossbills and many species of thrushes, sparrows and warblers. Brook trout, rainbow trout, and brown trout are found in many miles of excellent streams. Walleye, small and largemouth bass, crappie, northern pike, and many species of panfish make the area's lakes famous for freshwater fishing. A record making muskellunge, Wisconsin's state fish, was caught in these waters. The beauty, heritage, and recreational opportunities of these forests draw thousands of tourists to the Chequamegon–Nicolet area every year.

These national forests are best known for recreation, including camping, hiking, fishing, cross country skiing, and snowmobiling.

Clam Lake in Chequamegon National Forest was also home to one of the two extremely low frequency antennae in the United States.

== Gallery ==
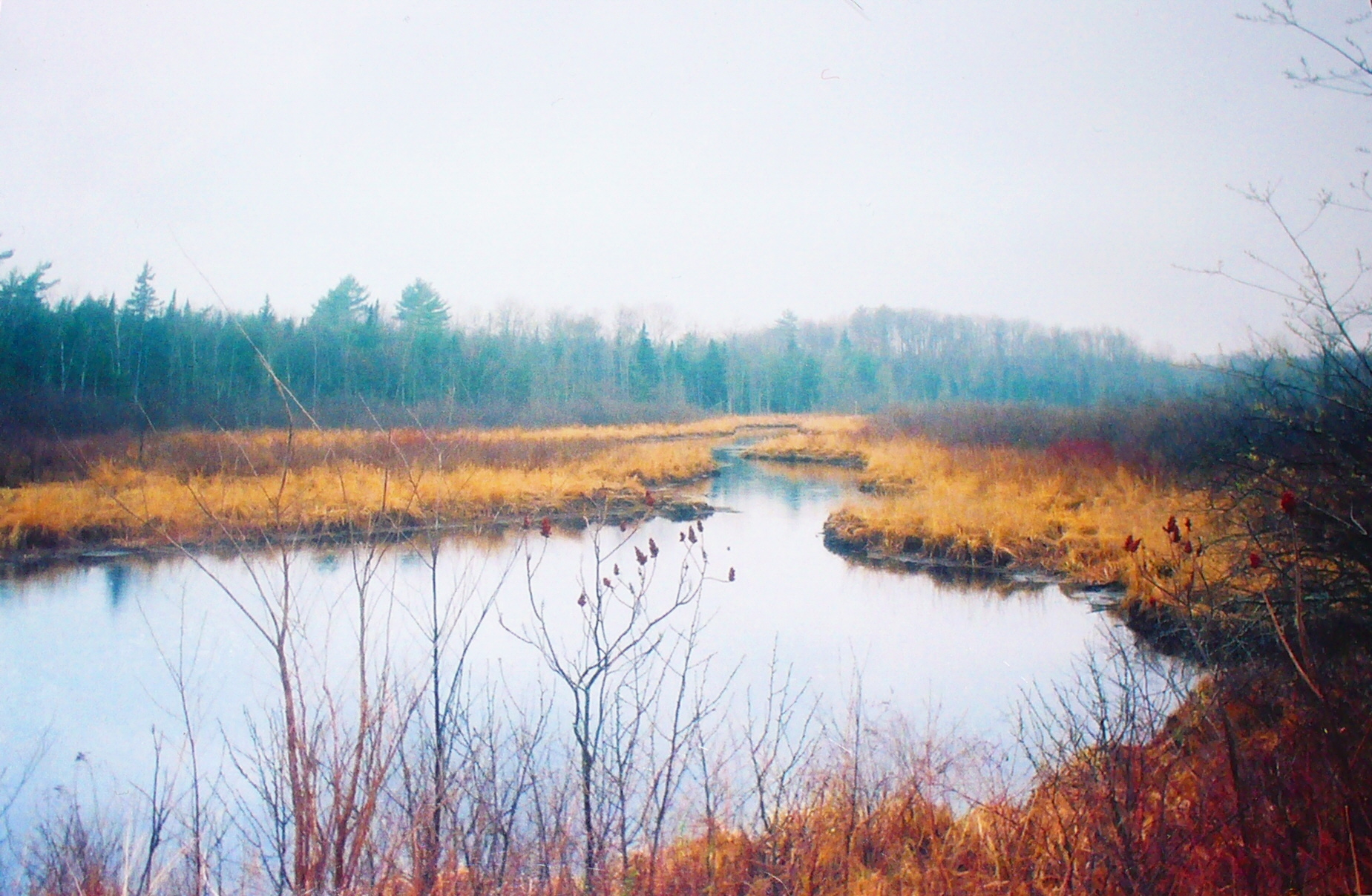
Early spring scene, near Clam Lake

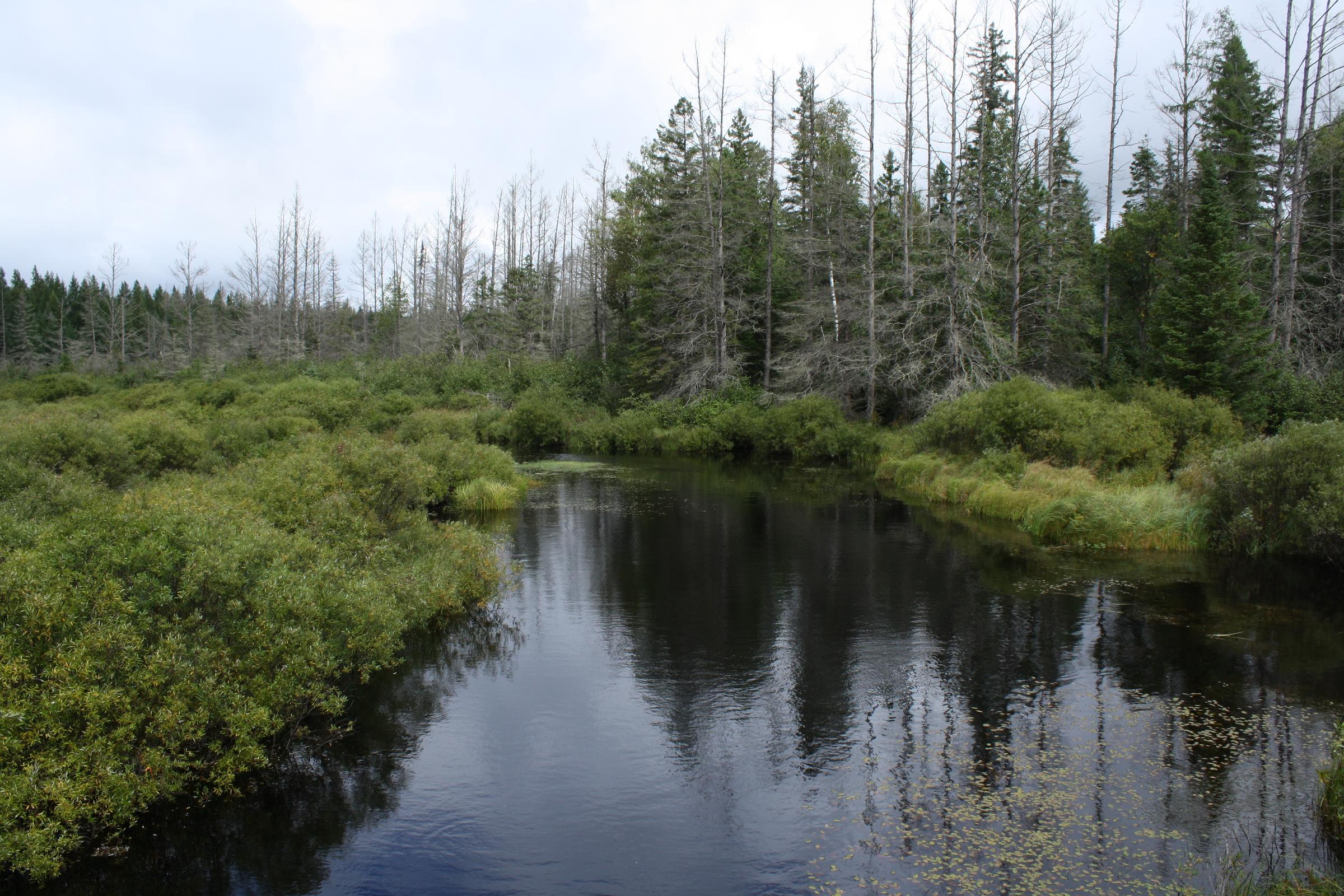
Headwaters Wilderness in the Nicolet National Forest, the Pine River

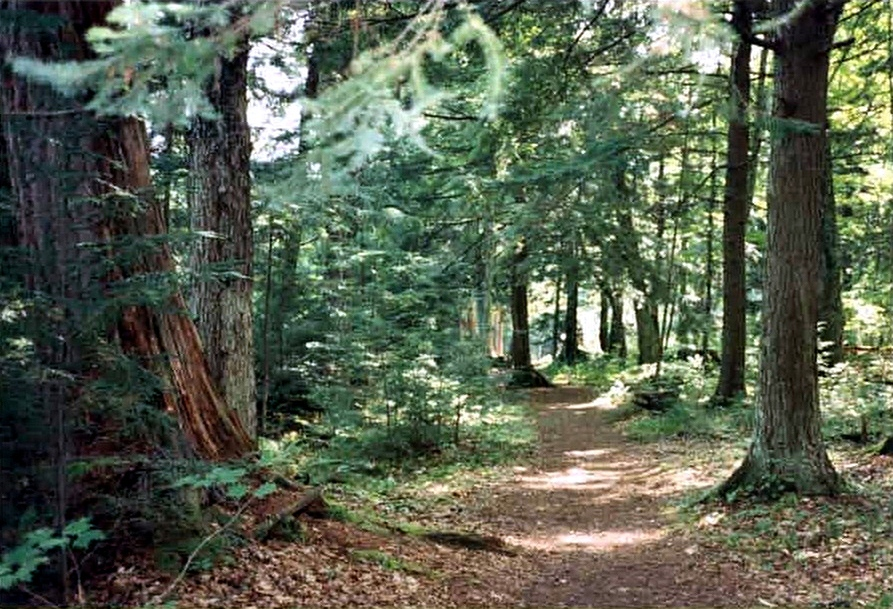
Hidden Lakes Trail in the forest, about 10 miles (16 km) east of Eagle River

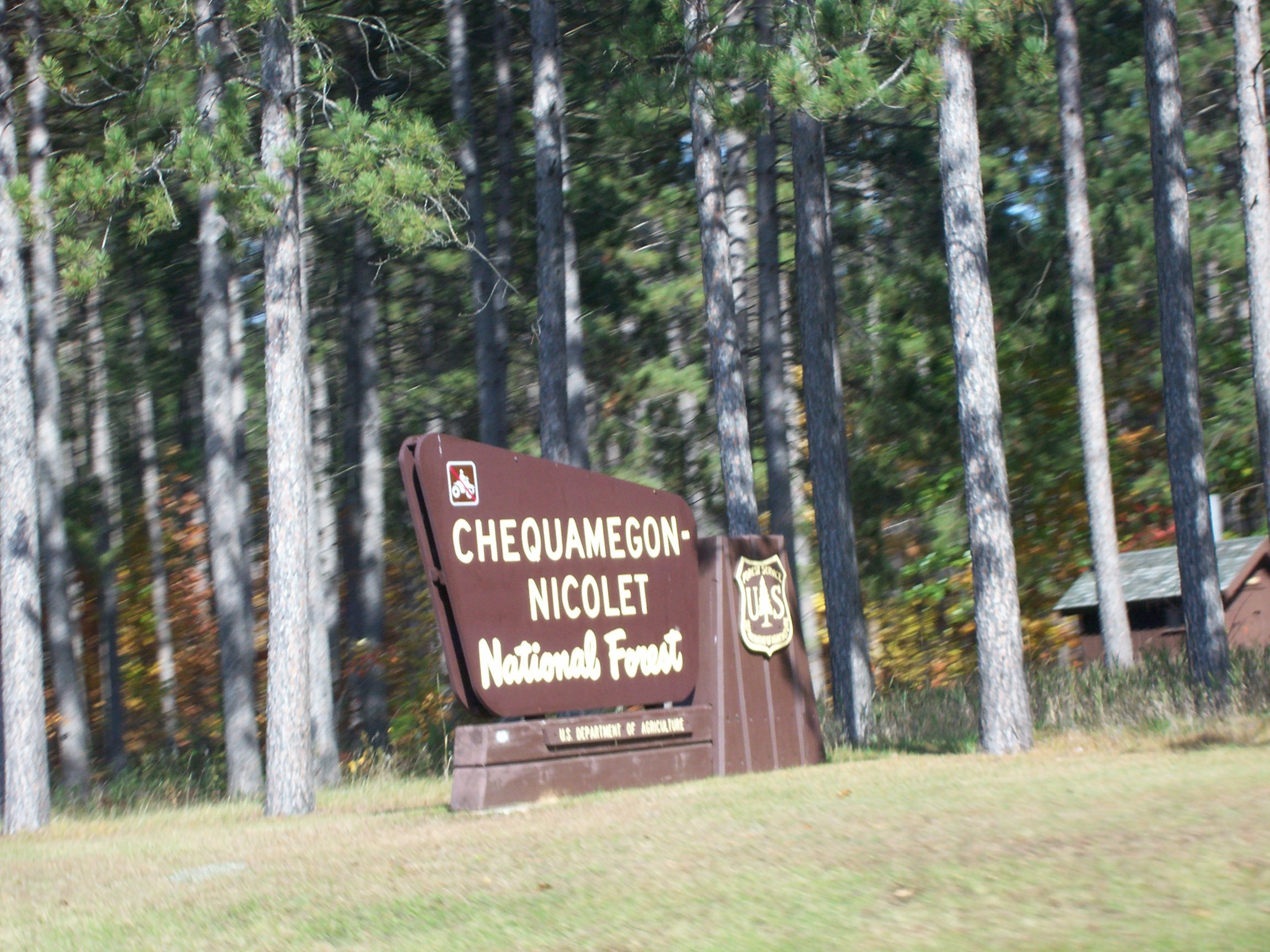
Welcome sign greeting visitors to the forest

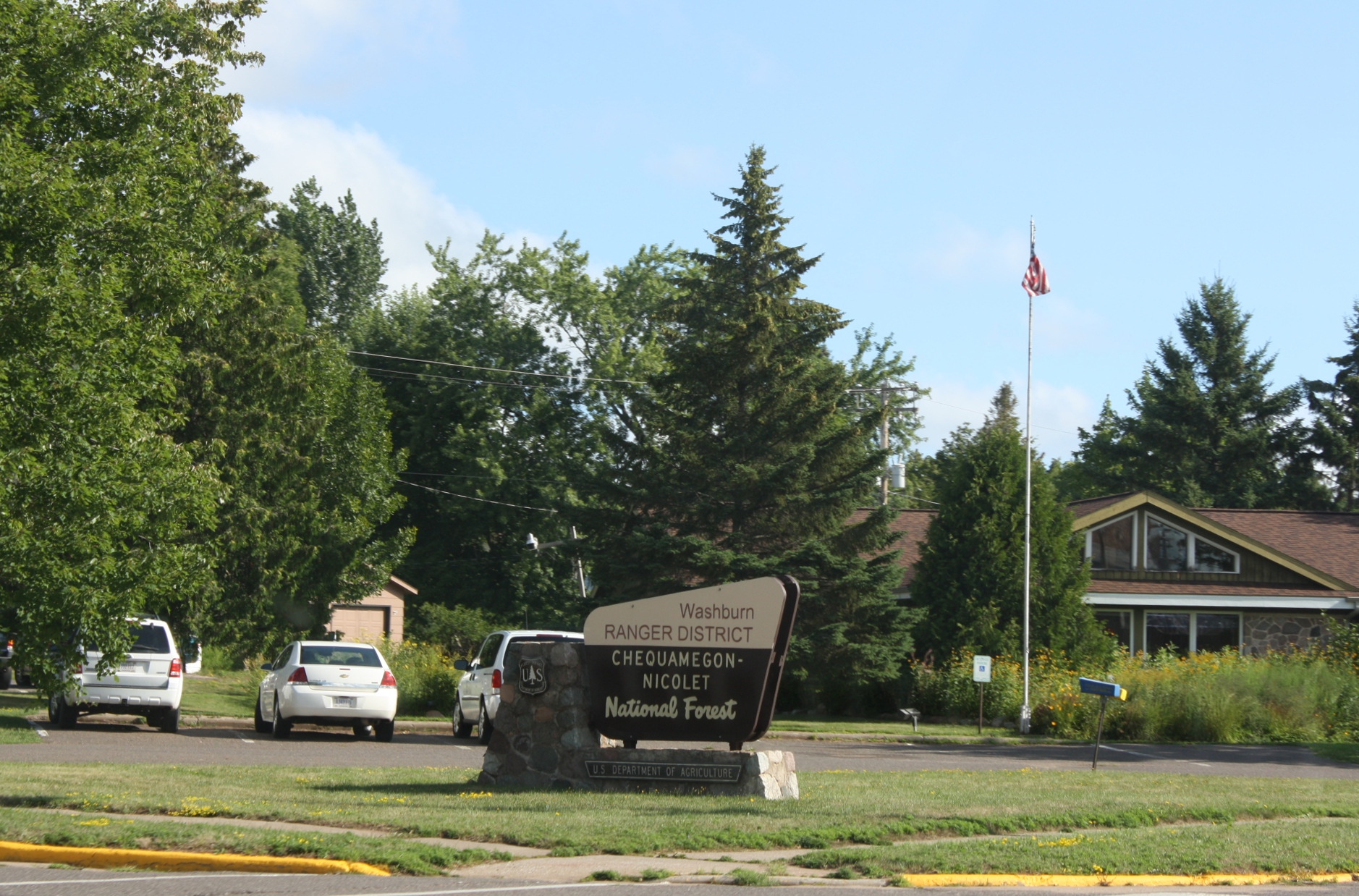
Ranger station in Washburn

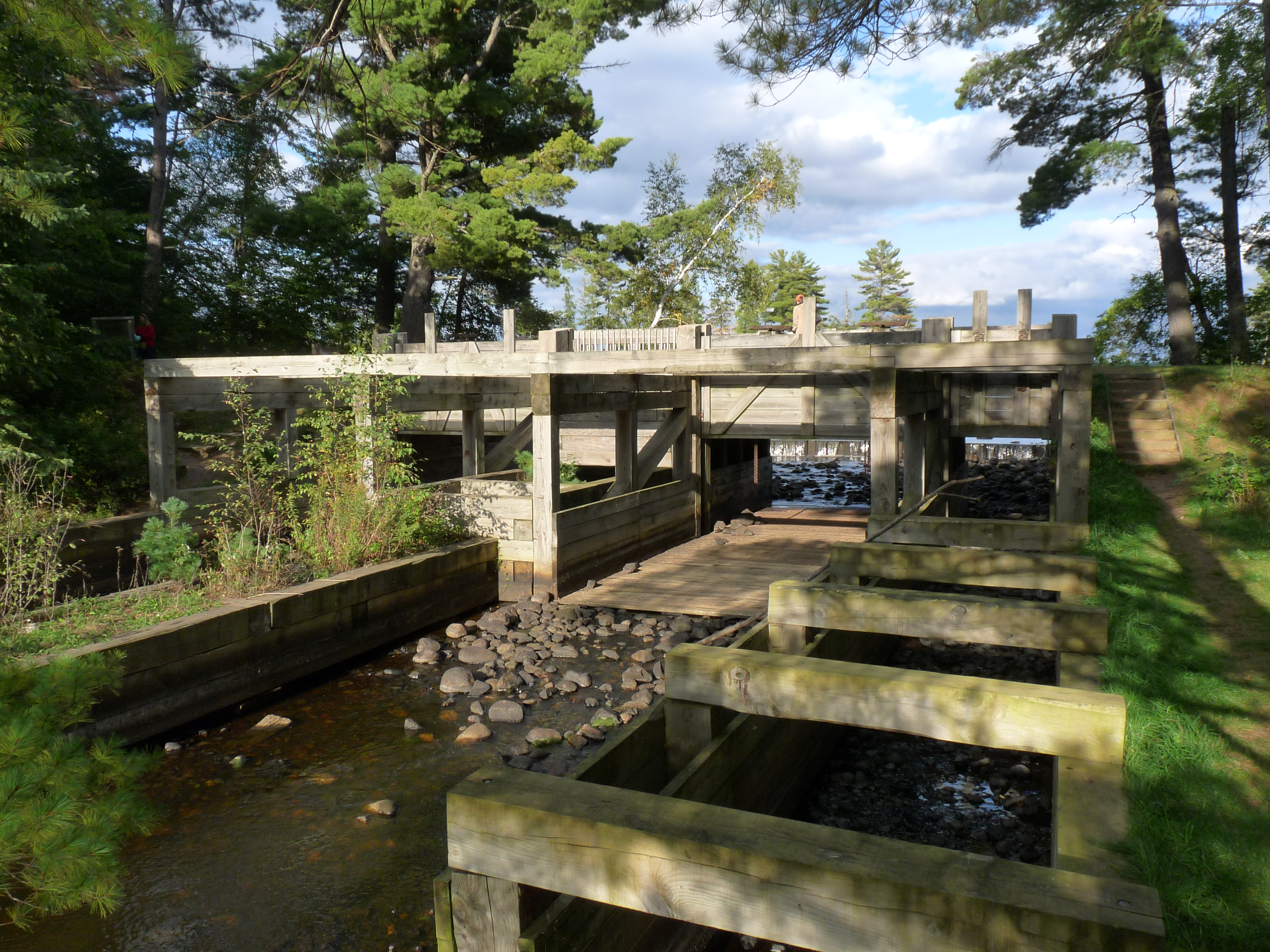
The Round Lake Logging Dam east of Fifield is a partially reconstructed log-driving dam from the late 1800s - the only such dam remaining in the state.

== See also ==
- List of national forests of the United States
- Lake Namakagon
