= Finnerud Forest Scientific Area =

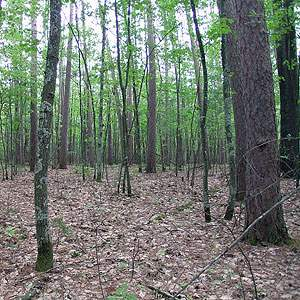
- Finnerud Forest Scientific Area

- Location within Wisconsin
- Location: Oneida County, Wisconsin
- Coordinates: 45°51′29″N 89°44′53″W
- Area: 300 acres (120 ha)

U.S. National Natural Landmark
- Designated: 1973

Finnerud Forest Scientific Area is a 300-acre (120 ha) forest in Oneida County, Wisconsin. The site is one a small amount of large areas in the states surrounding the Great Lakes that feature red pine trees of 100 years of age. It is owned by the University of Wisconsin–Madison. The forest was designated a Wisconsin State Natural Area in 1958 and a National Natural Landmark in 1973.
