= Lake Lucerne (disambiguation) =

Lake Lucerne (Vierwaldstättersee) is a lake in Switzerland.

Lake Lucerne or Lake Luzerne may also refer to:

== Lakes ==
- Lake Lucerne (California)
- Lake Lucerne (Polk County, Florida), a small lake north of Winter Haven
- Lake Luzerne (New York)
- Lake Lucerne (Wisconsin)
- Pipe Lake-Lake Lucerne two connected lakes in Washington

== Communities ==
- Lake Lucerne, Florida, neighborhood in Miami Gardens
- Lake Luzerne, New York, a town
  - Lake Luzerne (CDP), New York, hamlet within the town

== See also ==
- Lucerne (disambiguation)
