= Crandon =

Crandon may refer to:

== Places ==
- Crandon, South Dakota, an unincorporated community in Spink County
- Crandon, Wisconsin, a city in Forest County, Wisconsin
- Crandon (town), Wisconsin, in Forest County
- Crandon Park, a park in Miami

== People ==
- Esuan Crandon (born 1981), Indian cricketer
- Harry George Crandon (1874–1953), English recipient of the Victoria Cross
- Michael Crandon (born 1953), Australian politician
- Mina Crandon (1888–1941), Canadian-American spiritual medium
- Royston Crandon (born 1983), Indian cricketer

== Other uses ==
- Crandon Institute, Montevideo, Uruguay
