= Fourth Lake =

Fourth Lake may refer to:

- Fourth Lake (New York)
- Fourth Lake (Bisby Lakes, New York)
- Fourth Lake (Warren County, New York)
- Fourth Lake (Vancouver Island)
- Fourth Lake (Nova Scotia)
