= Lake Luzerne-Hadley, New York =

Lake Luzerne-Hadley
- Former CDP
- Location within New York Location within the United States
- Coordinates: 43°18′57″N 073°50′10″W
- Country: United States
- State: New York
- Counties: Saratoga, Warren

Area
  - Total: 4.2 sq mi (11.0 km^{2})
  - Land: 3.7 sq mi (9.7 km^{2})
  - Water: 0.46 sq mi (1.2 km^{2})

Population (2000)
  - Total: 2,240
  - Density: 595/sq mi (229.8/km^{2})
- Time zone: UTC-5 (Eastern (EST))
  - Summer (DST): UTC-4 (EDT)
- FIPS code: 36-40667

Lake Luzerne-Hadley was a census-designated place (CDP) in Saratoga and Warren counties in the U.S. state of New York. The portion in Warren County is part of the Glens Falls Metropolitan Statistical Area. The CDP consisted of the centers of population in the towns of Hadley (Saratoga County) and Lake Luzerne (Warren County).

The population was 2,240 at the 2000 census. For the 2010 census, the area was redelineated as two separate CDPs, Lake Luzerne (pop. 1,227) and Hadley (pop. 1,009). The CDPs are located at the confluence of the Sacandaga and Hudson rivers.

== Geography ==
According to the United States Census Bureau, the CDP had a total area of 4.2 square miles (11.0 km^{2}), of which 3.8 square miles (9.7 km^{2}) was land and 0.5 square miles (1.2 km^{2}), or 11.11%, was water.

== Demographics ==
As of the census of 2000, there were 2,240 people, 882 households, and 606 families residing in the CDP. The population density was 595.2 inhabitants per square mile (229.8/km^{2}). There were 1,355 housing units at an average density of 360.1 per square mile (139.0/km^{2}). The racial makeup of the CDP was 98.66% White, 0.36% African American, 0.04% Native American, 0.09% Asian, 0.04% from other races, and 0.80% from two or more races. Hispanic or Latino of any race were 0.58% of the population.

There were 882 households, out of which 33.7% had children under the age of 18 living with them, 53.3% were married couples living together, 11.3% had a female householder with no husband present, and 31.2% were non-families. 24.4% of all households were made up of individuals, and 10.7% had someone living alone who was 65 years of age or older. The average household size was 2.52 and the average family size was 2.99.

In the CDP, the population was spread out, with 26.1% under the age of 18, 7.1% from 18 to 24, 29.2% from 25 to 44, 23.1% from 45 to 64, and 14.6% who were 65 years of age or older. The median age was 38 years. For every 100 females, there were 93.4 males. For every 100 females age 18 and over, there were 90.8 males.

The median income for a household in the CDP was $34,922, and the median income for a family was $38,153. Males had a median income of $31,875 versus $19,444 for females. The per capita income for the CDP was $15,979. About 9.2% of families and 11.9% of the population were below the poverty line, including 20.1% of those under age 18 and 4.7% of those age 65 or over.
