= Elizabeth Pitcairn =

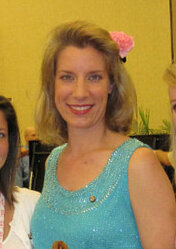
- Pitcarin in 2010

Background information
- Born: December 5, 1973 (age 52); Bucks County, Pennsylvania, U.S.
- Genre: Classical
- Occupation: Musician
- Instrument: Violin

Elizabeth Pitcairn (born December 5, 1973) is an American classical violinist who is noted for performing on the 1720 Red Mendelssohn Antonio Stradivari violin. In addition to a solo career, she is the president and artistic director of the Luzerne Music Center in Lake Luzerne, New York.

== Background ==
Pitcairn was born on December 5, 1973, into a musical family in Bucks County, Pennsylvania. Her mother, Mary Eleanor Pitcairn (née Brace), is a Juilliard trained cellist, and her father, Laren Pitcairn, trained to be an opera singer. Her great grandfather John Pitcairn Jr., a Scottish-born American industrialist and philanthropist, was the co-founder of the Pittsburgh Plate Glass Company.

Pitcairn began to play the violin at the age of three, and credits her mother with the roots of her success. “I owe everything I am to my mother, who with extreme perseverance taught me and guided me musically.”

After attending the Solebury School in New Hope, Pennsylvania, Pitcairn graduated from the University of Southern California, where she later taught alongside her former teacher, the renowned violin professor Robert Lipsett. She also taught violin at the Colburn School in Los Angeles.

== Career ==
Pitcairn debuted as a solo artist with the Newark Delaware Symphony at the age of 14, later appeared as soloist with the Philadelphia Orchestra at the Academy of Music, and was Concertmaster of the American Youth Symphony from 1994-97 under Mehli Mehta, the father of Zubin Mehta. She performed at the Marlboro Music Festival in 1997/98 and in 2000 made her New York debut at Alice Tully Hall with the New York String Orchestra. Since then, she has performed all over the world and made recordings of major concertos with orchestras such as the RTV Slovenia Symphony Orchestra, Sofia Philharmonic Orchestra and the Helsingborg Symphony Orchestra.

Pitcairn performs on the 1720 Red Mendelssohn violin made by Antonio Stradivari, said to have inspired the Academy Award–winning film The Red Violin, and is featured on the 10th Anniversary edition of The Red Violin DVD in a special commentary called “The Auction Block.” Pitcairn was a senior in high school when her grandfather gave her the instrument as a gift after making the winning bid during a 1990 Christie’s auction in London. At the time, it was the highest price ever paid at auction for a violin.

== Luzerne Music Center ==
In addition to a solo career, Pitcairn is the president and artistic director of the Luzerne Music Center located in Lake Luzerne, New York in the foothills of the Adirondack mountains. LMC provides music instruction for young musicians from all over the world in a summer camp environment.

Pitcairn began her long relationship with LMC while attending as a camper during the summers of 1988-89.

Since its inception in 1980, the camp has maintained strong relations with musicians from the Philadelphia Orchestra and the New York City Ballet who perform every summer in nearby Saratoga Springs. The professional musicians teach master classes and perform as guest artists at the camp.
