= Lake Luzerne (CDP), New York =

Lake Luzerne, New York
- Census-designated place
- Location within New York Location within the United States
- Coordinates: 43°19′1″N 73°50′26″W
- Country: United States
- State: New York
- County: Warren
- Town: Lake Luzerne

Area
  - Total: 4.68 sq mi (12.13 km^{2})
  - Land: 4.17 sq mi (10.80 km^{2})
  - Water: 0.51 sq mi (1.33 km^{2})
- Elevation: 610 ft (190 m)

Population (2020)
  - Total: 1,336
  - Density: 320.5/sq mi (123.73/km^{2})
- Time zone: UTC-5 (Eastern (EST))
  - Summer (DST): UTC-4 (EDT)
- ZIP Code: 12846
- Area codes: 518/838
- FIPS code: 36-40651
- GNIS feature ID: 2584271

Lake Luzerne is the primary hamlet and a census-designated place (CDP) within the town of Lake Luzerne, Warren County, New York, United States. As of the 2010 census, the population was 1,227, out of 3,347 residents in the entire town of Lake Luzerne. Before that, the community was part of the Lake Luzerne-Hadley census-designated place.

Lake Luzerne CDP is in southern Warren County, in the western part of its town. It is named for Lake Luzerne, a water body on the east side of the hamlet. The community is bordered to the west by the Hudson River, across which is the town of Hadley in Saratoga County. The Luzerne Music Center is on the east side of the lake.

New York State Route 9N passes through Lake Luzerne, leading northeast 11 miles (18 km) to Lake George and south 19 miles (31 km) to Saratoga Springs. Glens Falls is 12 miles (19 km) to the east by county roads.

== Demographics ==
Historical population
Census	Pop.	Note	%±
2020	1,336		—
U.S. Decennial Census
