= Hadley (CDP), New York =

Hadley, New York
- Census-designated place
- Location within New York Location within the United States
- Coordinates: 43°19′1″N 73°50′53″W
- Country: United States
- State: New York
- County: Saratoga
- Town: Hadley

Area
  - Total: 1.66 sq mi (4.31 km^{2})
  - Land: 1.46 sq mi (3.77 km^{2})
  - Water: 0.21 sq mi (0.55 km^{2})
- Elevation: 630 ft (190 m)

Population (2020)
  - Total: 1,124
  - Density: 773/sq mi (298.4/km^{2})
- Time zone: UTC-5 (Eastern (EST))
  - Summer (DST): UTC-4 (EDT)
- ZIP Code: 12835
- Area codes: 518/838
- FIPS code: 36-31258
- GNIS feature ID: 2584264

Hadley is the primary hamlet and a census-designated place (CDP) within the town of Hadley, Saratoga County, New York, United States. As of the 2010 census, the population was 1,009, out of 1,971 residents in the entire town of Hadley. Before that, the community was part of the Lake Luzerne-Hadley census-designated place.

Hadley CDP is in northern Saratoga County, in the southeastern part of its town. It is bordered to the east by the Hudson River, across which is the town of Lake Luzerne in Warren County. The Sacandaga River forms the southern edge of Hadley, joining the Hudson at the community's southeastern corner.

By road, Hadley is 5 miles (8 km) north of Corinth, 12 miles (19 km) west of Glens Falls, and 19 miles (31 km) north of Saratoga Springs.

== Demographics ==
Historical population
Census	Pop.	Note	%±
2010	1,009		—
2020	1,124		11.4%
U.S. Decennial Census
