= Metonga Lake =

Lake in Wisconsin, United States

- Location within Wisconsin Location within the United States
- Location: Forest County, Wisconsin
- Coordinates: 45.5409°N 88.9041°W
- Basin countries: United States
- Surface area: 2,038 acres (3.184 sq mi; 8.25 km^{2})
- Average depth: 25 ft (7.6 m)
- Max. depth: 79 ft (24 m)
- Water volume: 54,547 acre⋅ft (67,283,000 m^{3})
- Shore length^{1}: 7.9 mi (12.7 km)
- Surface elevation: 1,598 feet (487 m)
- Settlements: Crandon
- ^{1} Shore length is not a well-defined measure.

Metonga Lake is a lake located in Forest County, Wisconsin. The lake has a surface area of 2,038 acres (8.25 km^{2}) and a max depth of 79 ft (24 m). Metonga Lake is a drainage lake with a mostly sand and gravel bottom. The city of Crandon is located on the northern shore of the lake. The Crandon Municipal Airport lies on the southwestern shore.

== See also ==
List of lakes of Wisconsin
