= Lucerne (disambiguation) =

Lucerne (German: Luzern) is a city in Switzerland.

Lucerne, Luzern, or Luzerne may also refer to:

== Places ==
- Canton of Lucerne, a Canton in Switzerland, where the city is located
- Lake Lucerne, a lake in Switzerland
- Lucerne District, formerly within the canton, divided in 2013 into:
  - Lucerne-Land District, within the canton
  - Lucerne-Stadt District, includes the city only
- La Lucerne-d'Outremer, a village and commune in France
- Lucerna, a neighborhood in Santo Domingo, Dominican Republic

=== United States ===
- Lucerne, Arkansas; see List of places in Arkansas: L
- Lucerne, Lake County, California, a census-designated place
- Lucerne Valley, California, a census-designated place
- Lucerne, Colorado, an unincorporated community
- Lucerne, Indiana, an unincorporated community
- Lucerne, Kansas, a former town and post office
- Luzerne, Kentucky, an unincorporated community
- Lucerne, Michigan, a former settlement
- Luzerne, Michigan, an unincorporated community
- Lucerne, Missouri, a village
- Lucerne, Columbiana County, Ohio, a ghost town
- Lucerne, Knox County, Ohio, an unincorporated community
- Lucerne, Pennsylvania; see List of places in Pennsylvania: Lo–Ly
- Lucerne (Brownsville, Tennessee), a historic house and former plantation
- Lucerne, Washington, an unincorporated community
- Lucerne, West Virginia, an unincorporated community
- Lucerne, Wyoming, a census-designated place
- Lucerne Mines, Pennsylvania, a census-designated place
- Luzerne, Iowa, a city
- Luzerne County, Pennsylvania, a county
- Luzerne, Pennsylvania, a borough in Luzerne County
- Luzerne Township, Pennsylvania, a township

== People ==
- Anne-César, Chevalier de la Luzerne (1741–1791), French soldier and ambassador
- Antoine Garaby de La Luzerne (1617–1679), French author and moralist

== Other uses ==
- Lucerne (shipwreck), shipwreck site off the coast of La Pointe, Wisconsin
- Buick Lucerne, a full-size luxury sedan introduced for the 2006 model year
- Lucerne hammer, a medieval polearm weapon
- Lucerne (by Tolstoy), a short story by Leo Tolstoy
- Lucerne, the store brand for dairy and other products by Safeway Inc. or its subsidiaries. The rights to the Lucerne brand in Canada belong to Agropur and is sold in Canadian Safeway and Sobeys stores.
- Alfalfa, Medicago sativa, a species of perennial flowering plant also known as lucerne
- Cytisus proliferus, tree lucerne, a small evergreen tree

== See also ==
- Lake Lucerne (disambiguation)
