= Glens Falls metropolitan area =

Human settlement in United States of America

- Metropolitan Statistical Area
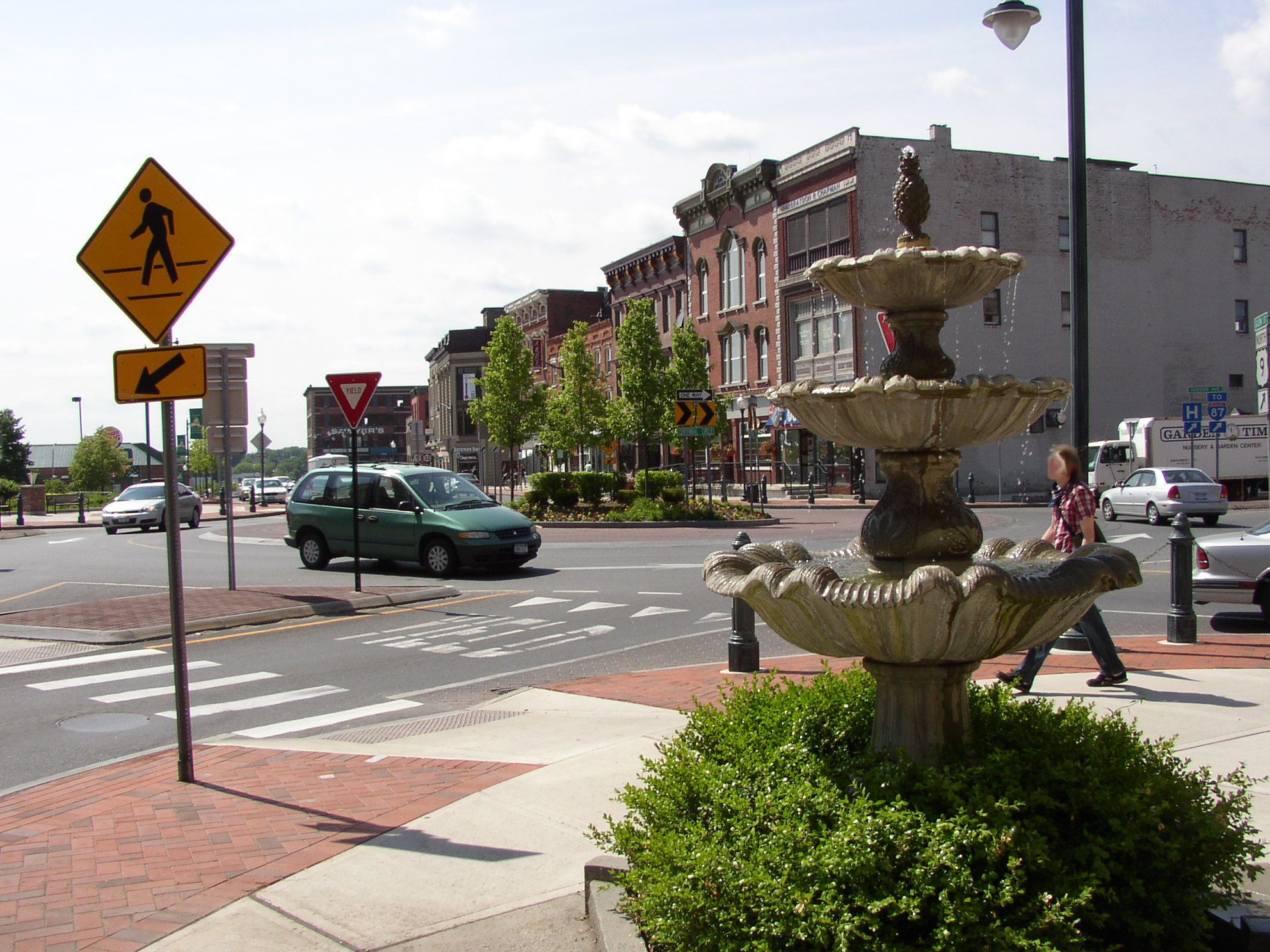
- Centennial Circle, a five-leg roundabout in downtown Glens Falls
Map of Glens Falls, NY MSA (yellow), along with other surrounding statistical areas, including the Capital District (brown).
City of Glens Falls
Glens Falls MSA
Other Counties in the Albany, NY CSA
- Country: United States
- State: New York
- Time zone: UTC−5 (EST)
  - Summer (DST): UTC−4 (Eastern Daylight Time)
- Area code: 518, 838

The Glens Falls Metropolitan Statistical Area, as defined by the United States Census Bureau, is an area consisting of two counties in Upstate New York, anchored by the city of Glens Falls. It is considered to be a part of the greater Capital District. As of the 2010 census, the MSA had a population of 128,942 (though a 2016 estimate placed the population at 126,367).

== Counties ==
- Warren
- Washington

== Communities ==
=== Places with more than 10,000 inhabitants ===
- Glens Falls (Principal city)
- Kingsbury (town)
- Queensbury (town)

=== Places with 5,000 to 10,000 inhabitants ===
- Fort Ann (town)
- Fort Edward (town)
- Glens Falls North (census-designated place)
- Granville (town)
- Hudson Falls (village)
- West Glens Falls (census-designated place)

=== Places with 2,500 to 5,000 inhabitants ===
- Argyle (town)
- Chester (town)
- Fort Edward (village)
- Granville (village)
- Greenwich (town)
- Lake George (town)
- Lake Luzerne (town)
- Salem (town)
- Warrensburg (town)
- White Creek (town)
- Whitehall (town)
- Whitehall (village)

=== Places with 1,000 to 2,500 inhabitants ===
- Bolton (town)
- Cambridge (town)
- Cambridge (village)
- Easton (town)
- Greenwich (village)
- Hartford (town)
- Hebron (town)
- Horicon (town)
- Jackson (town)
- Johnsburg (town)
- Lake Luzerne-Hadley (census-designated place; partial)
- Thurman (town)

=== Places with fewer than 1,000 inhabitants ===
- Argyle (village)
- Dresden (town)
- Fort Ann (village)
- Hague (town)
- Hampton (town)
- Lake George (village)
- Putnam (town)
- Salem (CDP)
- Stony Creek (town)

=== Hamlets ===
- East Greenwich (hamlet)
- Chestertown (hamlet)

Middle Falls, New York (hamlet)

== Demographics ==
As of the census of 2000, there were 124,345 people, 48,184 households, and 32,843 families residing within the MSA. The racial makeup of the MSA was 96.25% White, 1.75% African American, 0.21% Native American, 0.42% Asian, 0.01% Pacific Islander, 0.53% from other races, and 0.84% from two or more races. Hispanic or Latino of any race were 1.52% of the population.

The median income for a household in the MSA was $38,433, and the median income for a family was $45,147. Males had a median income of $32,230 versus $22,220 for females. The per capita income for the MSA was $19,343.

== See also ==
- New York census statistical areas
