= East Greenwich, New York =

Hamlet in New York, United States

Coordinates: 43°08′45″N 73°23′52″W

East Greenwich is a hamlet in the Town of Greenwich in Washington County, New York United States. It is part of the Glens Falls, New York Metropolitan Statistical Area.

The community is located on NY Route 29 in the southeastern corner of the town. It is on the north bank of the Batten Kill, which historically provided water power for industry.

== See also ==
- Manor of East Greenwich
