= Lucerne (shipwreck) =

Schooner wrecked in Lake Superior

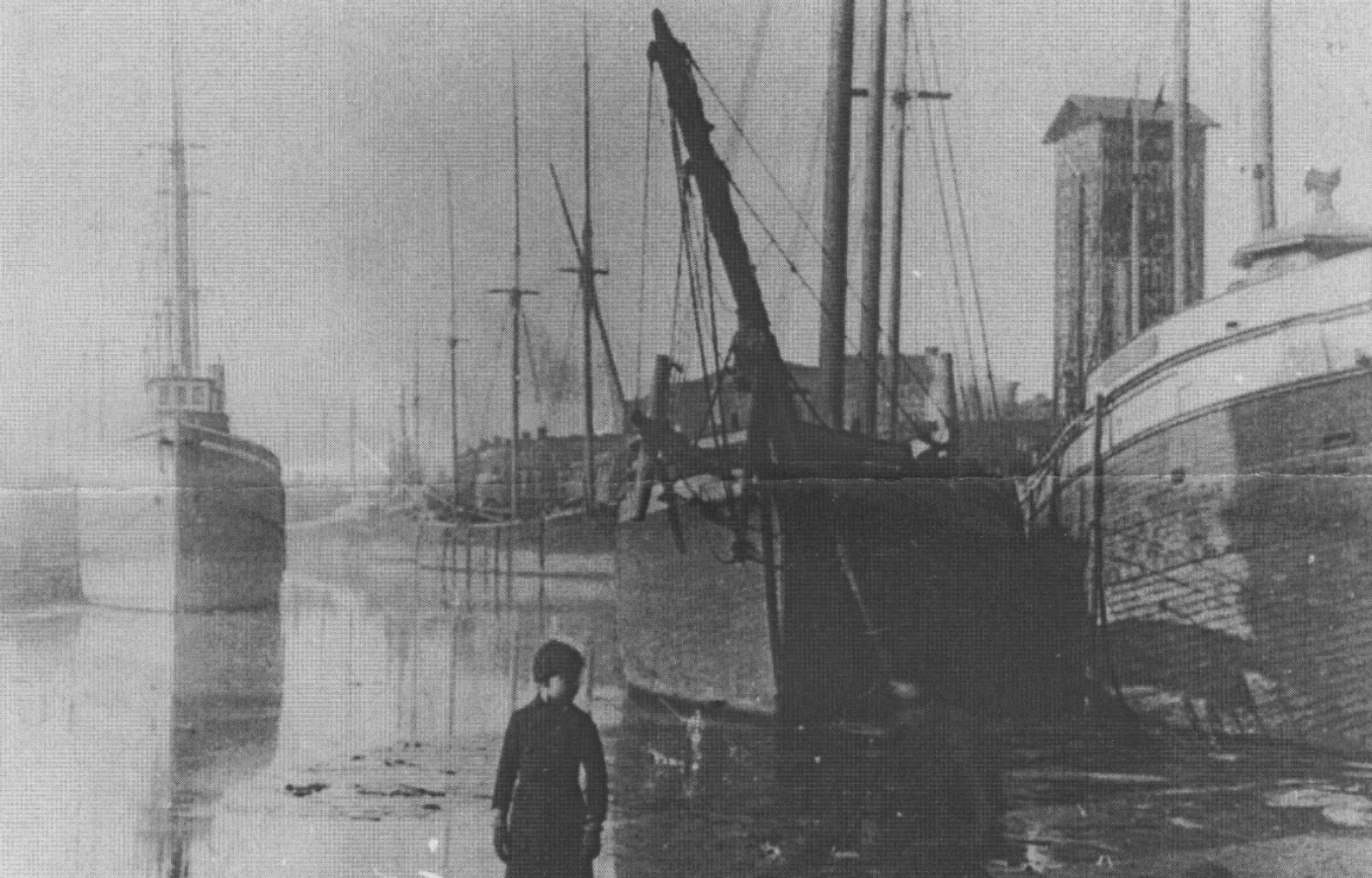
- An early 1880s photograph of Lucerne

History

United States
- Name: Lucerne
- Owner: William Mack (part owner)
- Operator: Captain George George S. Lloyd, skipper William Mack
- Port of registry: United States
- Launched: April 23, 1873
- Fate: Lost with all 10 hands in a storm on November 17 or 18, 1886
- Status: Added to the National Register of Historic Places in 1991
- Notes: Location: 46°43.389′N 90°46.035′W

General characteristics
- Type: Schooner
- Tonnage: 728 gross tons
- Length: 195 feet (59 m)
- Capacity: 1,330
- Crew: 9
- Lucerne (Shipwreck)
- U.S. National Register of Historic Places
- Nearest city: La Pointe, Wisconsin
- NRHP reference No.: 91001775
- Added to NRHP: December 18, 1991

Lucerne was a commercial schooner. In November 1886, she sank due to bad weather in Lake Superior, off Long Island in Chequamegon Bay. The site of the wreck was added to the National Register of Historic Places in 1991.

== History ==
Lucerne was launched on April 23, 1873. She was nearly 195 feet (59 m) long and reportedly cost $55,000 to build.

On November 15, 1886, Lucerne was loaded with 1,200 tons of iron ore at her home port, Ashland, Wisconsin. The load was consigned to Little, Oglebay and Company of Cleveland, Ohio. After the delivery, the captain and crew began a voyage back to Ashland. With new canvas sails and a light wind blowing, all the signs pointed to a speedy voyage home. However, a November snowstorm on the lake began developing that night.

On November 17 or 18, 1886, Lucerne succumbed to the violent storm, and sank off Long Island. At the height of the storm, the captain of the ship Fred Kelly had sighted Lucerne, but Fred Kelly unfortunately could not offer any help to the distressed ship under the circumstances. Nobody witnessed Lucerne's final minutes, and none of the crew survived.

William Mack, part owner of Lucerne, became worried when the ship never arrived back at Ashland. He telegraphed Bayfield, Wisconsin, and asked for a search vessel to be sent. The boat S. B. Barker was dispatched for the purpose, but did not have to go far to find the wreckage of Lucerne. The S. B. Barker′s crew discovered three masts sticking out of the water. Upon closer inspection, they saw three of the ship's crew members there, frozen solid in three inches (76 mm) of ice. Apparently they had climbed to the top of the masts to escape the freezing waters of Lake Superior and had perished there while waiting to be rescued. The three bodies were moved to Bayfield.

== See also ==
- Lucerne (disambiguation)
- Apostle Islands
- List of shipwrecks in the Great Lakes
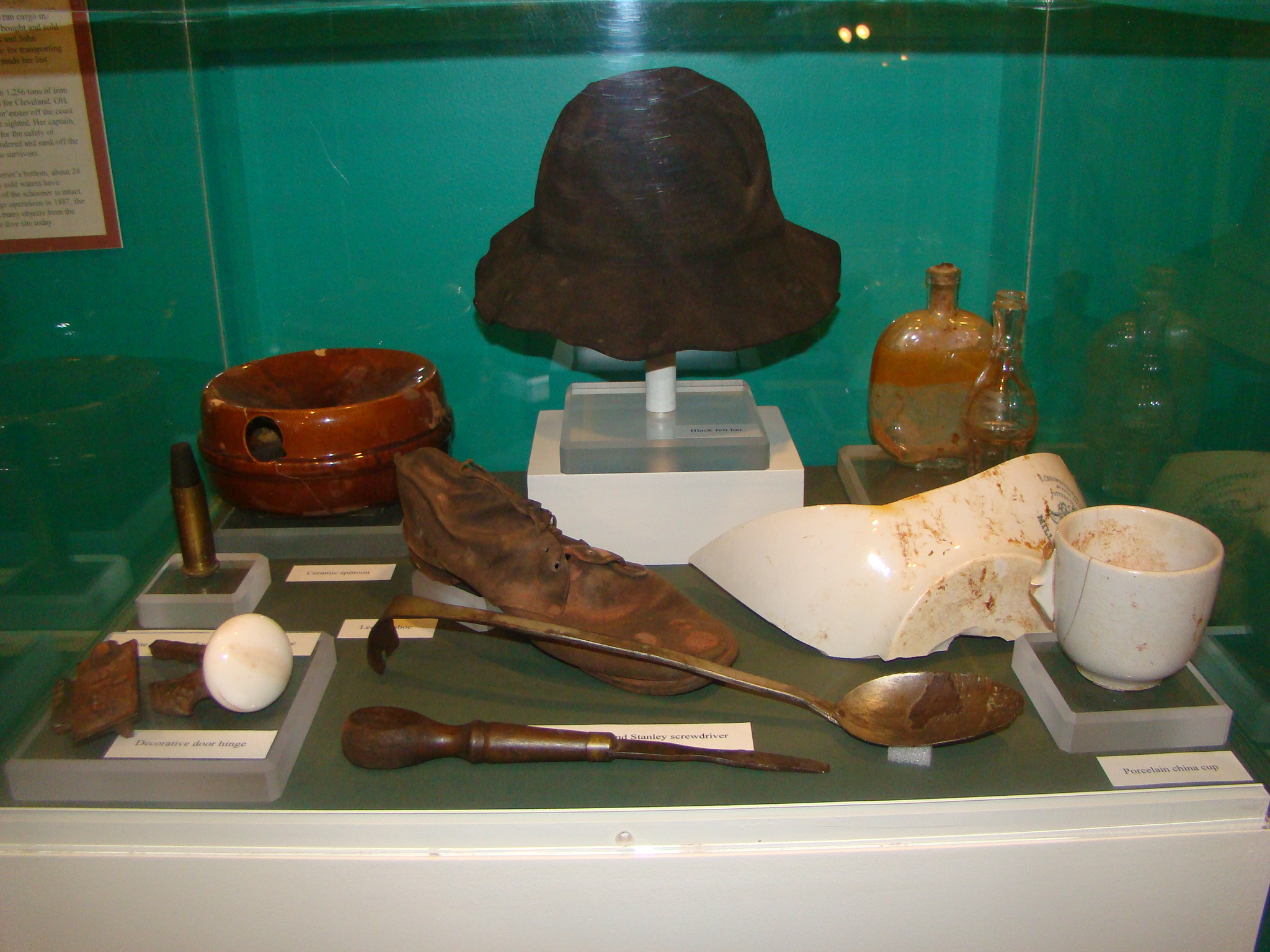
Items recovered from the Lucerne shipwreck site, on display at the Madeline Island Historical Museum.

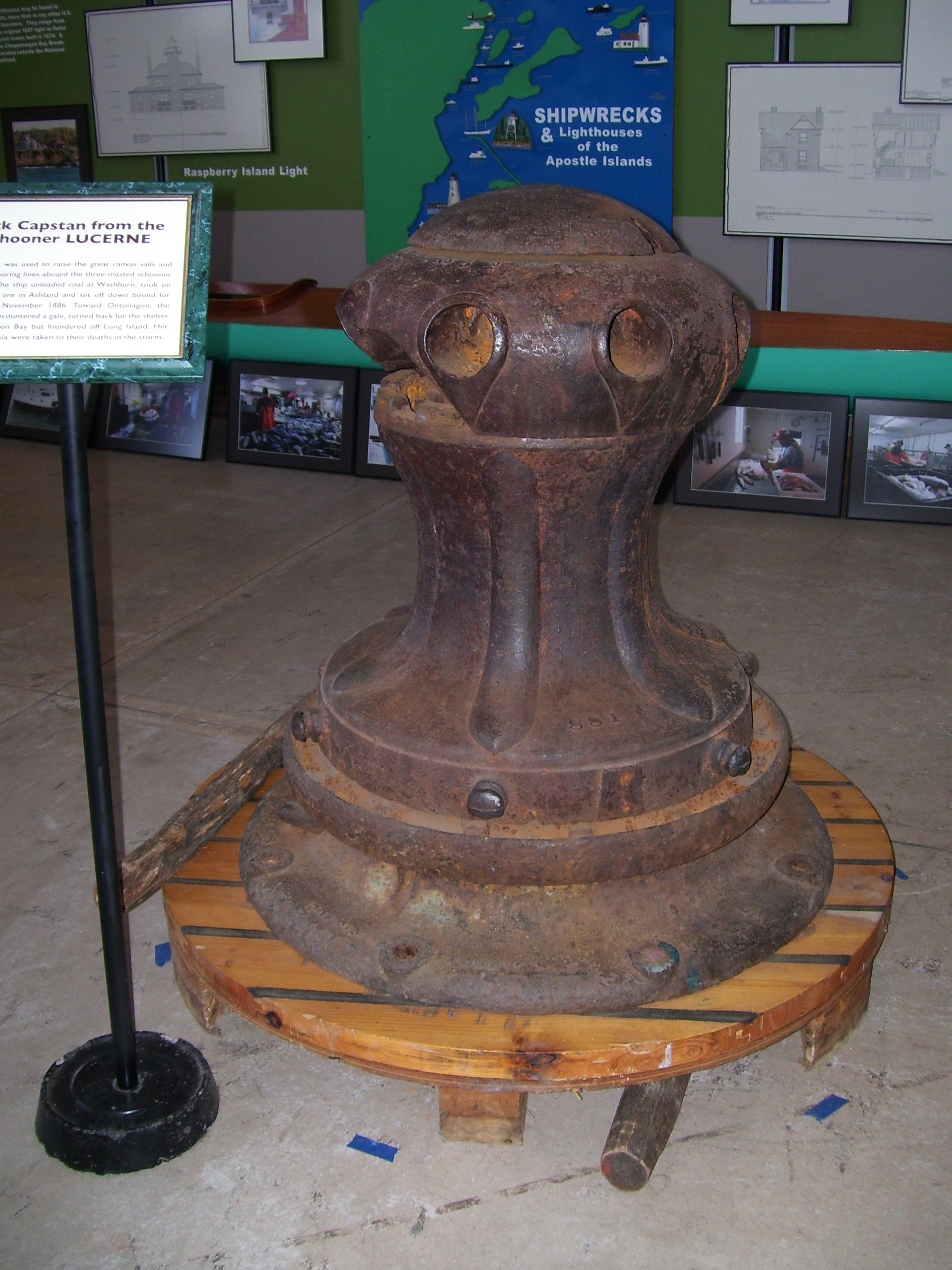
This capstan was used to raise the great canvas sails and to handle mooring lines aboard the three-masted schooner Lucerne. It remains on display at the Bayfield Maritime Museum.
