= Woodward Hall =

Historic house in New York, United States

- U.S. National Register of Historic Places
- Location within New York Location within the United States
- Location: 1312 Lake Ave., Lake Luzerne, New York
- Coordinates: 43.36886°N 73.79242°W
- Area: 3.02 acres (1.22 ha)
- Built: 1931-1932
- Built by: Ogburn, Harold
- Architect: LaViolette, Eugene
- Architectural style: Tudor Revival, Colonial Revival
- NRHP reference No.: 14000206
- Added to NRHP: May 12, 2014

Woodward Hall, also known as the Stone House, Earl Woodard House, and "Woodhill," is a historic home located in the town of Lake Luzerne in Warren County, New York. It was built in 1931–1932, and is a two-story, rectangular building, five bays wide and two bays deep, with Tudor Revival and Colonial Revival style design elements in a somewhat eclectic design. It has fieldstone walls and a cross-gable slate roof and sits on a poured concrete foundation. It has a small, two-bay garage attached to the main block. It was built for Earl Woodward (1891-1956), who reinvented Adirondack tourism in the Lake George region through the introduction of dude ranch style resorts during the 1920s.

It was listed on the National Register of Historic Places in 2014.
