= Fourth Lake (Warren County, New York) =

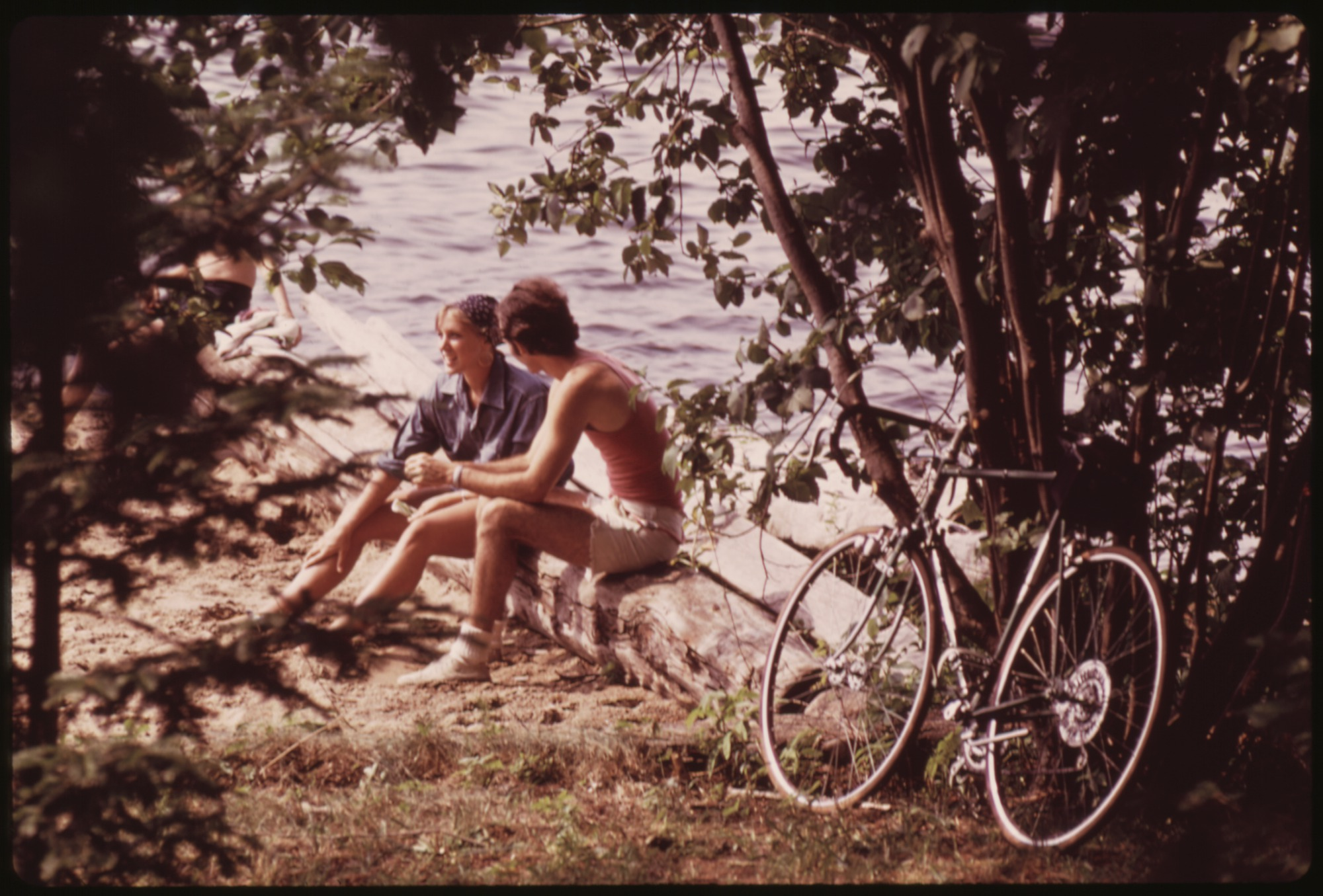

- Location within New York Location within the United States
- Location: Warren County, New York, United States
- Coordinates: 43°21′27.0″N 73°49′28.7″W
- Type: Lake
- Basin countries: United States
- Surface area: 51 acres (0.21 km^{2})
- Average depth: 10 feet (3.0 m)
- Max. depth: 41 feet (12 m)
- Shore length^{1}: 1.5 miles (2.4 km)
- Surface elevation: 637 feet (194 m)
- Settlements: Fourth Lake, New York
- ^{1} Shore length is not a well-defined measure.

Fourth Lake is located near Fourth Lake, New York. Fish species present in the lake are northern pike, smallmouth bass, largemouth bass, bluegill, yellow perch, pumpkinseed sunfish, and brown bullhead. There is a state owned carry down located north of the hamlet of Fourth Lake on the west shore.
