= Harry George Crandon =

Recipient of the Victoria Cross (1874–1953)

Harry George Crandon VC
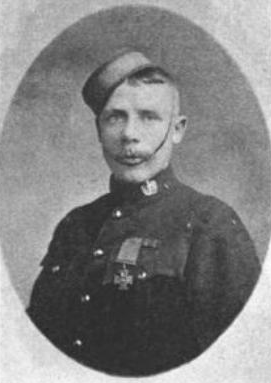
- Crandon c. 1903
- Born: 12 February 1874; Wells, Somerset, England
- Died: 2 January 1953 (aged 78); Manchester, Lancashire, England
- Burial place: Swinton Cemetery, Swinton, Lancashire
- Military career
- Allegiance: United Kingdom
- Branch: British Army
- Rank: Corporal
- Units: 18th Hussars
- Conflicts: Second Boer War; World War I
- Awards: Victoria Cross

Corporal Harry George Crandon VC (12 February 1874 – 2 January 1953) was an English recipient of the Victoria Cross, the highest and most prestigious award for gallantry in the face of the enemy that can be awarded to British and Commonwealth forces.

== Details ==
He was born in Wells, Somerset, on 12 February 1874. At the age of 27 years, he was a private in the 18th Hussars (Queen Mary's Own), British Army during the Second Boer War when the following deed took place for which he was awarded the VC.

On the 4th July, 1901, at Springbok Laagte, Privates Berry and Crandon were scouting towards a kopje when the Boers suddenly opened fire on them at a range of 100 yards. Private Berry's horse fell and became disabled, and he was himself shot in the right hand and left shoulder. Private Crandon at once rode back under a heavy fire to his assistance, gave up his horse to the wounded man to enable him to reach shelter, and followed him on foot, having to run for 1,100 yards, all the time under fire.

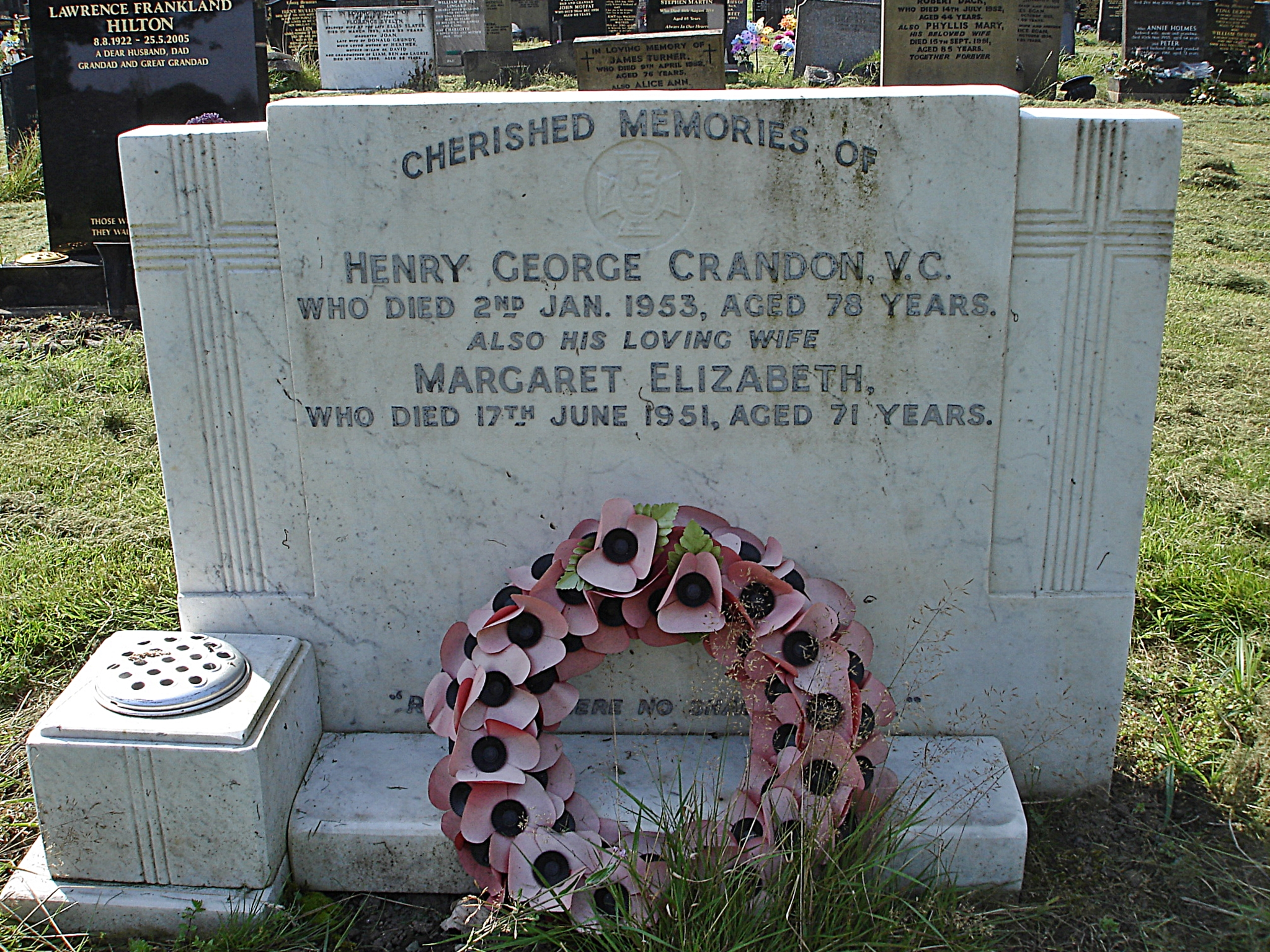
Crandon's grave in Swinton Cemetery

He later achieved the rank of corporal and served in World War I where he was wounded. He died in 1953 and was buried in Swinton Cemetery, Salford.

== Crandon Court, Pendlebury ==
He is commemorated in the town where he was buried by a sheltered housing complex named in his honour. Crandon Court stands on North Dean Street, just off Bolton Road (A666), Pendlebury, about 2 miles from his resting place.
