= Crandon, Wisconsin =

- City
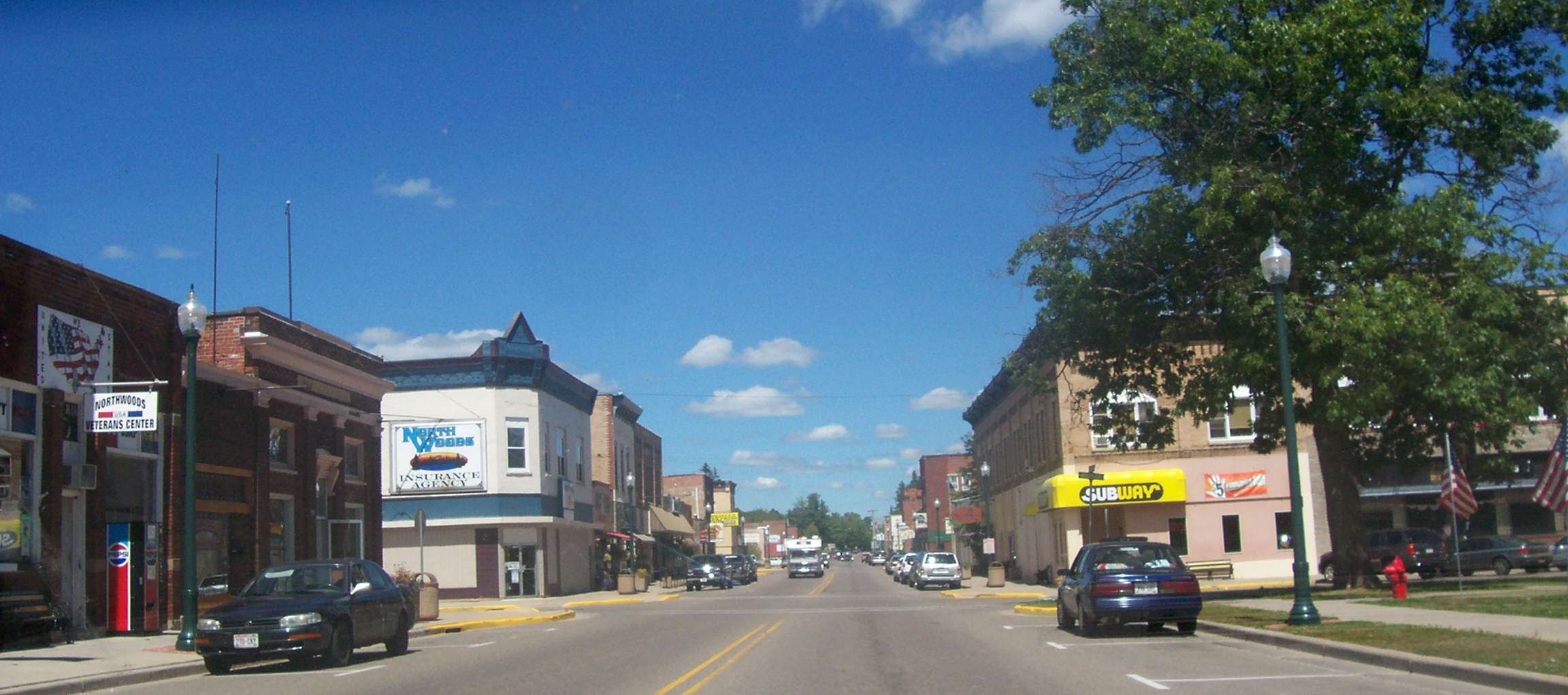
- Looking north at downtown Crandon

- Location of Crandon in Forest County, Wisconsin.

- Location within Wisconsin Crandon (the United States)
- Coordinates: 45.569845°N 88.901240°W
- Country: United States
- State: Wisconsin
- County: Forest
- Founded: 19th century
- Established: 1887
- Incorporated: 1909

Government
  - Mayor: George Stamper

Area
  - Total: 6.19 sq mi (16.03 km^{2})
  - Land: 5.22 sq mi (13.52 km^{2})
  - Water: 0.97 sq mi (2.51 km^{2})

Population (2020)
  - Total: 1,713
  - Density: 328.1/sq mi (126.7/km^{2})
- Time zone: UTC-6 (Central (CST))
  - Summer (DST): UTC-5 (CDT)
- ZIP code: 54520
- Area code: 715 & 534
- FIPS code: 55-17425
- Website: www.cityofcrandon.info

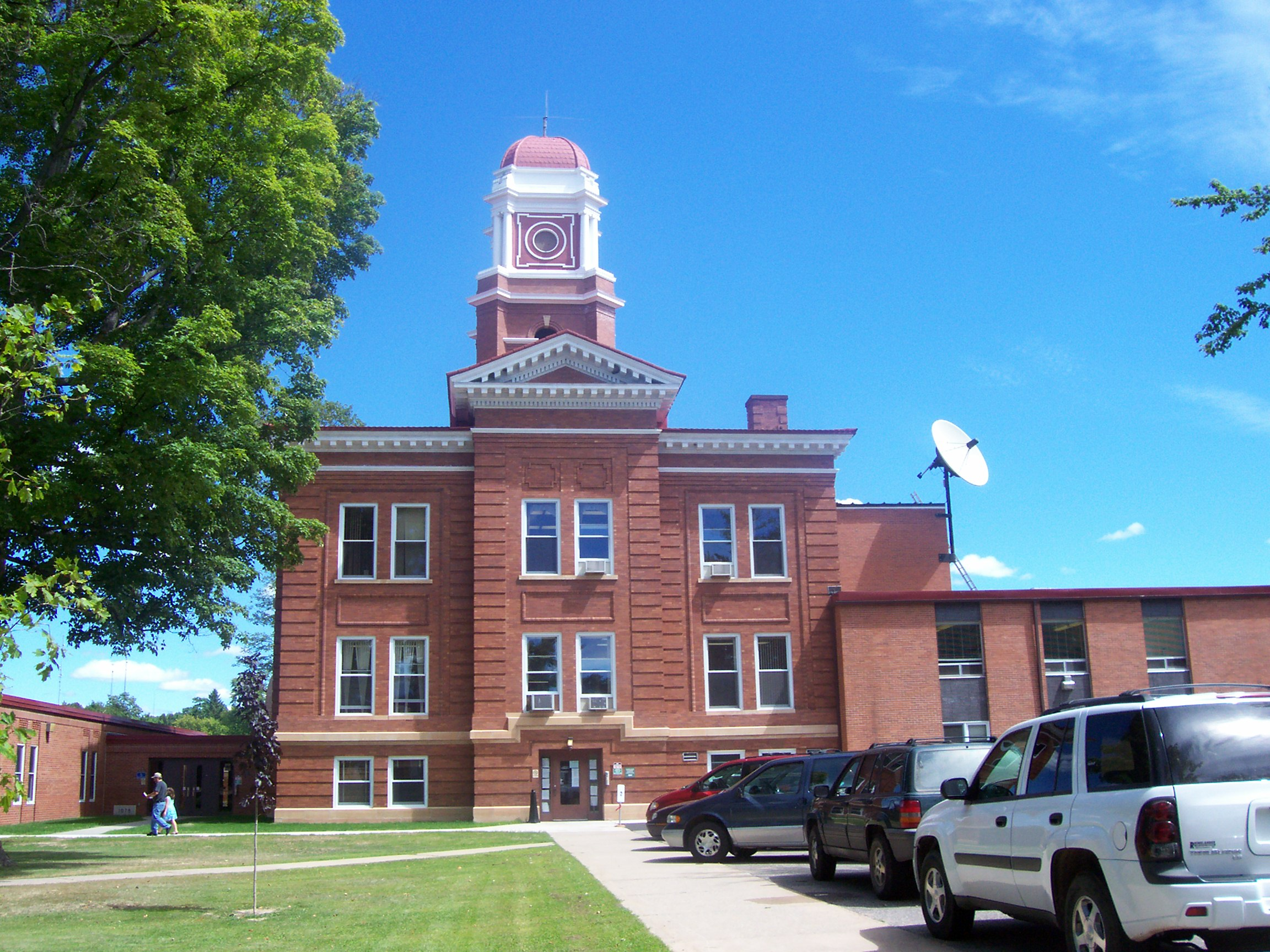
Looking east at downtown Crandon

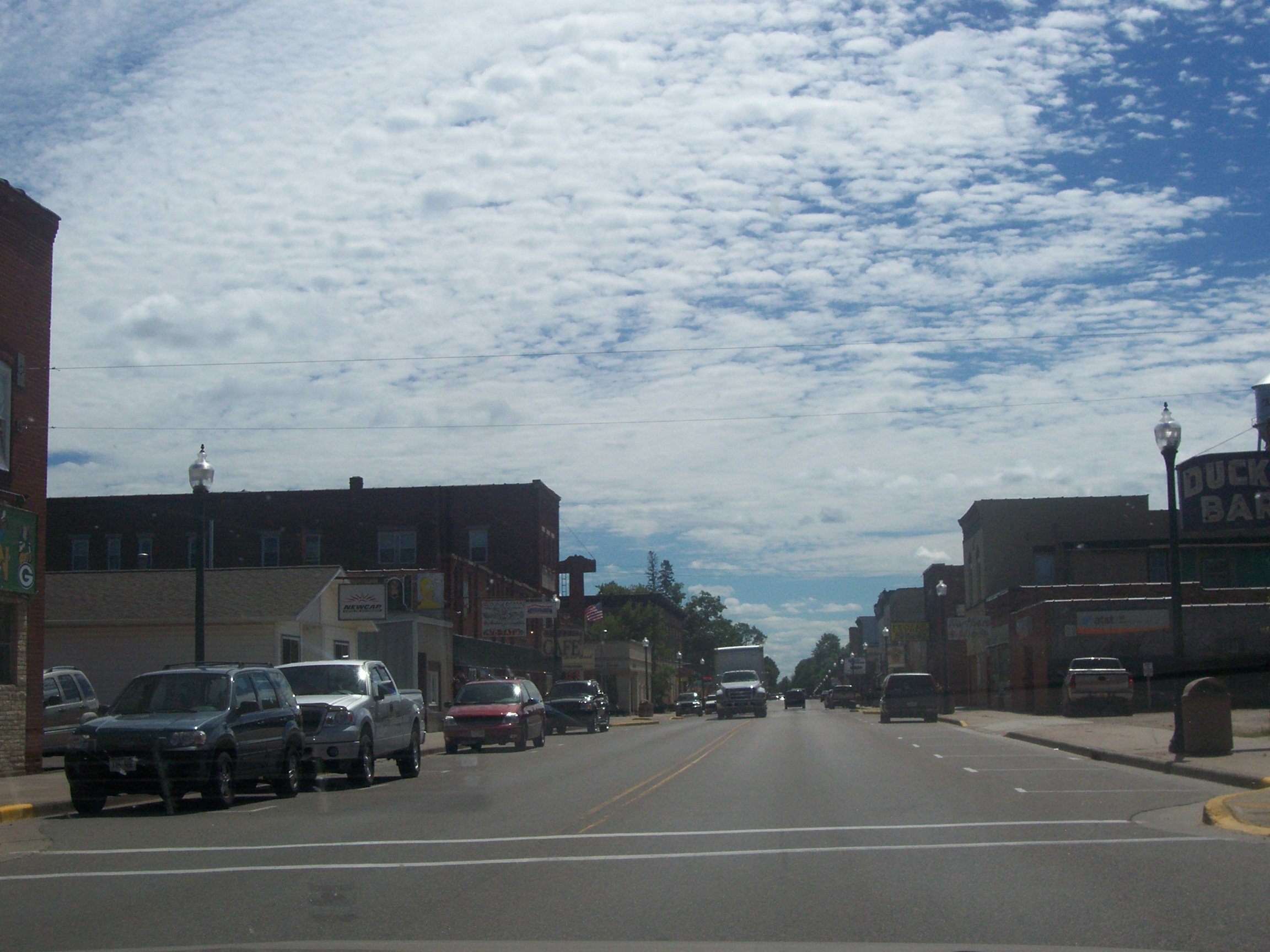
Looking south at downtown Crandon

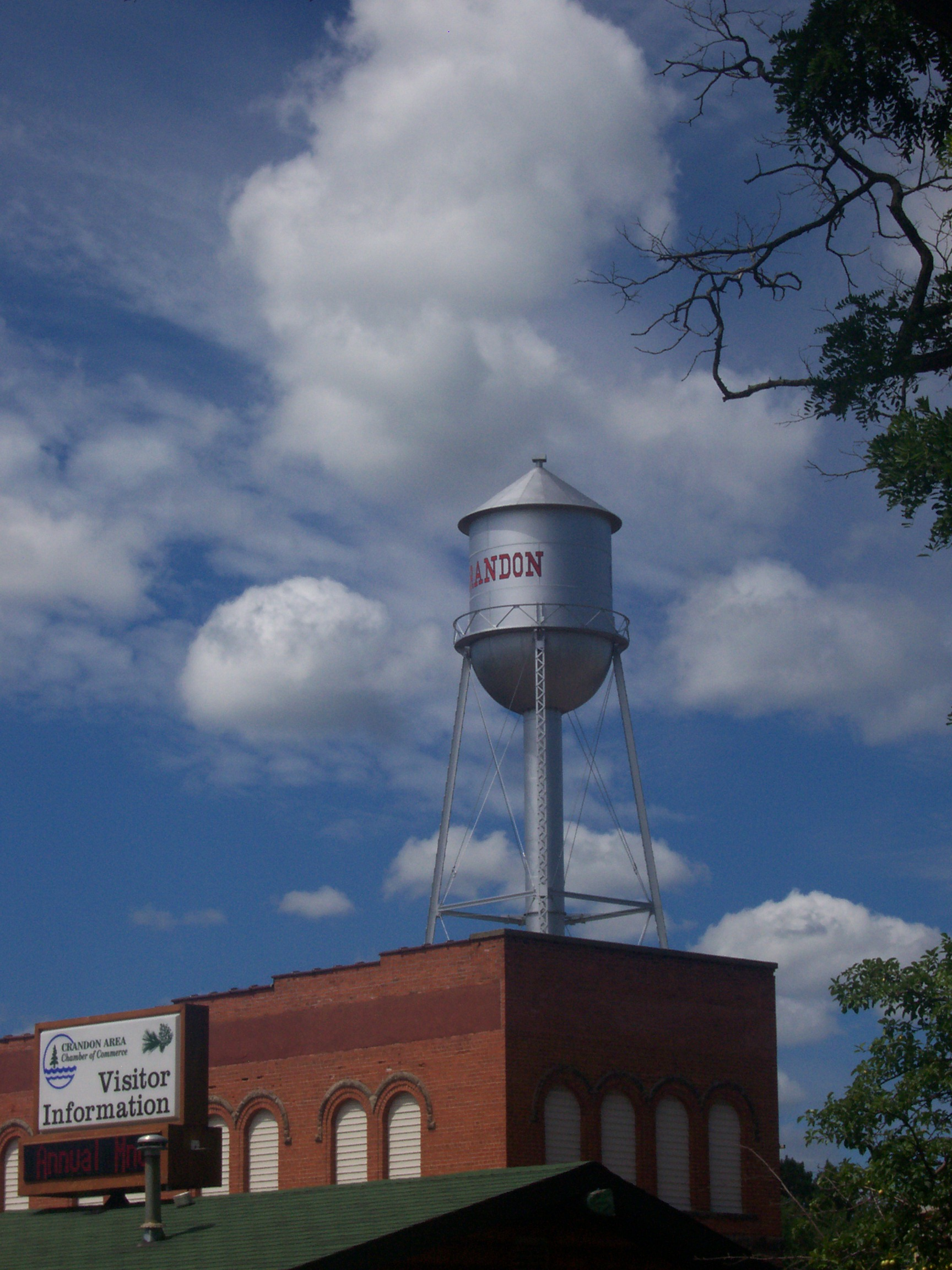
Water tower

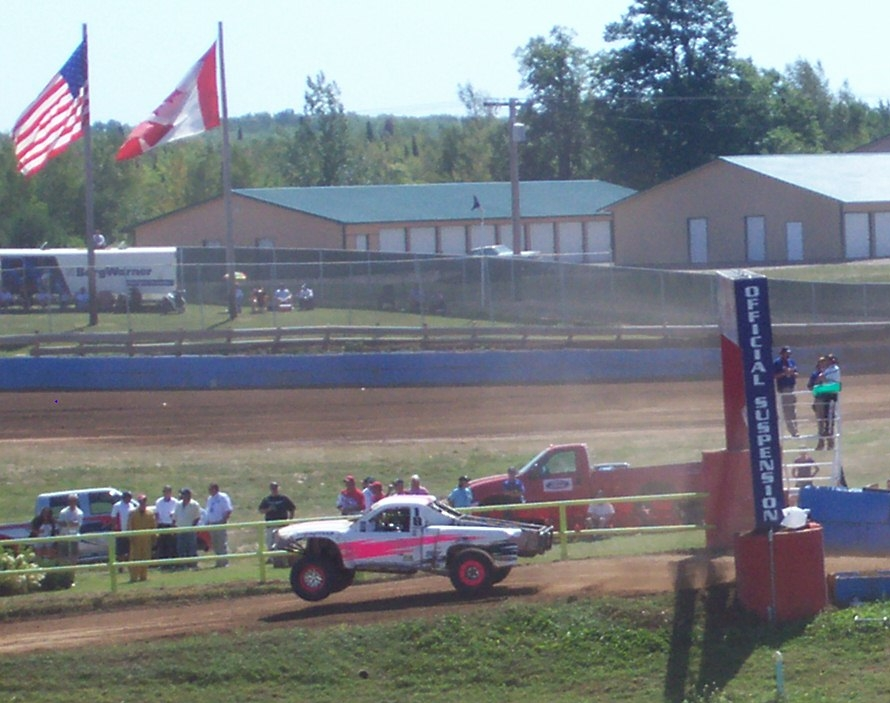
Crandon International Off-Road Raceway

Crandon is a city in Forest County, Wisconsin, United States; it is in the northeastern part of the state, about 100 miles (160 km) north of Green Bay. The population was 1,713 at the 2020 census. It is the county seat of Forest County and is the only incorporated community in the county. The city is located adjacent to the Town of Crandon.

== History ==
Samuel Shaw, an entrepreneur and capitalist, bought property in the area of Forest County in the 1880s, formerly Oconto County. With the aide of Major Frank P. Crandon, tax commissioner with the Chicago and North Western Transportation Company, he successfully lobbied the Wisconsin Legislature for the creation of Forest County, which was established in 1887. Because of his help, Frank Crandon became the namesake for the county seat. Rail service arrived shortly thereafter in the region via the Soo Line Railroad, but a spur line did not directly reach the town until the turn of the 20th century.

The lumber industry defined the early growth of the city. In 1891, Page and Landeck Lumber Company purchased a tract of hardwood timberlands near Crandon, and by 1902, the company built a huge sawmill (later named the Keith & Hiles Lumber Mill) near Clear Lake on Crandon's north side. The population of Crandon grew from 800 to more than 2,400 in just a few years. With the rail line's presence, settlers and loggers from Kentucky were recruited for the bustling timber industry of northern Wisconsin. The company's sawmill eventually was moved to Crandon from Glasgow, Kentucky. Modern culture lore reflects the early "Kentuck" ancestors. Originally named "Ayr" after Ayr, Scotland, the city was officially incorporated as Crandon in 1909 after construction of the county courthouse began, and much of the town's building stock was constructed during this time. Though timber has diminished as a prominent industry in the north-central United States, logging companies still operate in the nearby Nicolet National Forest.

From the 1980s to 2003, Crandon was the center of an environmental debate to construct a mining operation at the proposed Crandon mine, a rich copper deposit discovered by the Exxon Coal and Minerals Company. The heated discussion led to a Wisconsin Legislature mining moratorium act in 1998. Eventually, the proposed company and mine site lands were purchased by the opposed Mole Lake Sakaogon Chippewa and Forest County Potawatomi tribes, whose reservations sat near the site. The project was withdrawn in October 2003.

On October 7, 2007, Crandon drew the attention of national and world media when Tyler Peterson, an employee of the Forest County Sheriff's Department and a part-time officer for the Crandon Police Department, shot seven people, wounding one and killing six in the town. They ranged in age from 14 to 20.

On July 29, 2014, Crandon voters recalled their mayor by roughly a 2–1 margin.

== Geography ==
According to the United States Census Bureau, the city has a total area of 6.19 square miles (16.03 km^{2}), of which 5.22 square miles (13.52 km^{2}) is land and 0.97 square miles (2.5 km^{2}) is water. The city lies on the northern shore of Metonga Lake. Lake Lucerne is also only a few miles from the city. There is a large crater in the town's park, Culversinesis Park, caused by a large dairy truck accident in 1962.

== Demographics ==
Historical population
Census	Pop.	Note	%±
1910	1,833		—
1920	1,632		−11.0%
1930	1,679		2.9%
1940	2,000		19.1%
1950	1,922		−3.9%
1960	1,679		−12.6%
1970	1,582		−5.8%
1980	1,969		24.5%
1990	1,958		−0.6%
2000	1,961		0.2%
2010	1,920		−2.1%
2020	1,713		−10.8%
U.S. Decennial Census

=== 2020 census ===
As of the census of 2020, the population was 1,713. The population density was 328.1 inhabitants per square mile (126.7/km^{2}). There were 959 housing units at an average density of 183.7 per square mile (70.9/km^{2}). The racial makeup of the city was 83.4% White, 7.6% Native American, 1.5% Black or African American, 0.1% Pacific Islander, 0.4% from other races, and 7.1% from two or more races. Ethnically, the population was 2.0% Hispanic or Latino of any race.

=== 2010 census ===
As of the census of 2010, there were 1,920 people, 771 households, and 496 families residing in the city. The population density was 367.8 inhabitants per square mile (142.0/km^{2}). There were 964 housing units at an average density of 184.7 per square mile (71.3/km^{2}). The racial makeup of the city was 86.1% White, 0.4% African American, 9.3% Native American, 0.3% Asian, 0.1% Pacific Islander, 0.2% from other races, and 3.6% from two or more races. Hispanic or Latino of any race were 2.1% of the population.

There were 771 households, of which 30.6% had children under the age of 18 living with them, 41.4% were married couples living together, 17.0% had a female householder with no husband present, 6.0% had a male householder with no wife present, and 35.7% were non-families. 30.5% of all households were made up of individuals, and 14.1% had someone living alone who was 65 years of age or older. The average household size was 2.33 and the average family size was 2.87.

The median age in the city was 40 years. 23.1% of residents were under the age of 18; 10% were between the ages of 18 and 24; 22.6% were from 25 to 44; 26.2% were from 45 to 64; and 18.1% were 65 years of age or older. The gender makeup of the city was 48.4% male and 51.6% female.

=== 2000 census ===
As of the census of 2000, there were 1,961 people, 803 households, and 489 families residing in the city. The population density was 375.8 people per square mile (145.0/km^{2}). There were 961 housing units at an average density of 184.1 per square mile (71.1/km^{2}). The racial makeup of the city was 91.18% White, 0.25% Black or African American, 7.04% Native American, 0.15% Asian, 0.05% from other races, and 1.33% from two or more races. Hispanic or Latino of any race were 0.92% of the population.

There were 803 households, out of which 32.0% had children under the age of 18 living with them, 43.1% were married couples living together, 14.7% had a female householder with no husband present, and 39.1% were non-families. 36.4% of all households were made up of individuals, and 16.2% had someone living alone who was 65 years of age or older. The average household size was 2.29 and the average family size was 2.96.

In the city, the population was spread out, with 26.6% under the age of 18, 8.5% from 18 to 24, 24.3% from 25 to 44, 20.8% from 45 to 64, and 19.8% who were 65 years of age or older. The median age was 37 years. For every 100 females, there were 82.6 males. For every 100 females age 18 and over, there were 81.7 males.

The median income for a household in the city was $27,125, and the median income for a family was $35,260. Males had a median income of $27,763 versus $20,227 for females. The per capita income for the city was $14,757. About 10.5% of families and 14.4% of the population were below the poverty line, including 19.1% of those under age 18 and 10.8% of those age 65 or over.

== Transportation ==
=== Major highways ===
U.S. 8 routes eastbound to Laona. Westbound, US 8 routes to Rhinelander.
WIS 32 runs concurrently with U.S. 8 and runs north to Eagle River, Wisconsin.
WIS 55 travels north to Iron River, Michigan and south to Shawano.

=== Airports ===
Crandon is served by the Crandon Municipal Airport (Y55). Located three miles southwest of the city, the airport has a 3,550 foot asphalt runway with approved GPS approaches (Runway 12-30).

The Rhinelander-Oneida County Airport (KRHI) serves Crandon and surrounding communities with both scheduled commercial jet service and general aviation services.

== Economy ==
Major industries include logging, tourism and light industry. The recreation and camping industry also includes the home of the World Championship Off-Road Races (see Sports in Wisconsin). The downtown contains typical restaurants, retail and services of a small city serving nearly 2000 residents. With the tourism influx the town also has many hotels, lodges, and inns. Crandon has two casinos, the Mole Lake casino and Potawatomi Bingo and Northern Lights Casino. CoVantage Credit Union is the area's largest financial company.

== Arts and recreation ==
Crandon's outdoor recreation opportunities include fishing, hunting, snowmobiling, and ATV/UTV Trails with many lakes and hundreds of miles of trails in the surrounding area. Crandon is the home of the Crandon International Off-Road Raceway, which hosts the world championship off-road races.

The annual Kentuck Days Festival celebrates the area's ancestral Kentucky heritage.

== Media ==
TV broadcast stations around Crandon:

- WYOW (Channel 34; Eagle River; Owner: WAOW-WYOW Television, Inc.)
- WJFW-TV (Channel 12; Rhinelander; Owner: Northland Television, Inc.)
- WTPX-TV (Channel 46; Antigo; Owner: Ion Media Wausau License, Inc.)

== Notable residents ==
- Jack Flannery, off-road racing driver
- Amos E. Germer, Wisconsin State Representative
- Lloyd H. Kincaid, Wisconsin State Senator
- Herman L. Kronschnabl, Wisconsin State Representative
- Kathleen A. Krosnicki, Wisconsin State Representative
- Alexander H. Smith, mycologist

== See also ==
- Flambeau Mine near Ladysmith, Wisconsin
