= Fourth Lake (Nova Scotia) =

Fourth Lake (Nova Scotia) could mean the following :

== Municipality of Clare ==
- Fourth Lake Flowage located at 44°21′44″N 65°41′44″W

== Halifax Regional Municipality ==
- Fourth Lake located at 45°0′58″N 62°24′30″W
- Fourth Lake located at 44°58′0″N 62°20′40″W
- Fourth Lake located at 44°53′11″N 62°42′8″W
- Fourth Lake located at 44°30′38″N 63°55′5″W
- Fourth Lake located at 44°30′45″N 63°43′25″W

== Municipality of the District of Staint Mary's ==
- Fourth Lake located at 45°9′32″N 61°56′5″W
- Fourth Lake located at 45°8′32″N 61°56′30″W
