= Lucerne, West Virginia =

- Unincorporated community
- Location within the state of West Virginia Lucerne (the United States)
- Coordinates: 38°59′55″N 80°52′48″W
- Country: United States
- State: West Virginia
- County: Gilmer
- Elevation: 778 ft (237 m)
- Time zone: UTC-5 (Eastern (EST))
  - Summer (DST): UTC-4 (EDT)
- GNIS ID: 1549802

Lucerne is an unincorporated community in Gilmer County, West Virginia, United States. Its post office is closed.
