= Luzerne Music Center =

Coordinates: 43.32039°N 73.82584°W

- Lake Luzerne, NY, New York; United States

Information
- Type: Educational institution
- Motto: Building Young Artists and Audiences of the Future
- Established: 1980
- Executive director: Elizabeth Pitcairn
- Campus: Wooded, rural, on a lake, located in Adirondack Park
- Website: http://www.luzernemusic.org/

Luzerne Music Center (LMC) is a summer music camp and performing arts center, founded in 1980, located on Lake Luzerne, in the Adirondack Park region of New York, United States.

LMC is located approximately four hours north of New York City and one hour north of Albany. Pre-college students who play strings, piano, brass, woodwinds or percussion live in residence at the camp, study music with members of the Philadelphia Orchestra and perform concerts for eights weeks of the summer. LMC hosts a summer chamber music festival with performances by faculty members and guest artists.

== History ==
The Philadelphia Orchestra began a summer residency at Saratoga Performing Arts Center (SPAC) in Saratoga Springs, New York, in 1966. Many members of the orchestra found summer homes in nearby communities, including Lake Luzerne. Present-day LMC was formerly Camp Tekawitha, a Catholic boys camp owned and operated by the Roman Catholic Diocese of Albany from 1910 to 1976. The camp was purchased in 1980 by Bert Phillips, Philadelphia Orchestra cellist and his wife, Toby Blumenthal, Steinway artist and pianist.

From the book Hadley and Lake Luzerne:

The camp for Catholic boys was established in 1910. It was named in honor of Katiri Tekawitha, a Native American who was presented for sainthood in recent years. The camp is now the home of the Lake Luzerne Music Camp.

Phillips and Blumenthal served together as executive directors of LMC from 1980 until Phillips died in 2008. Blumenthal continued to serve as executive director until 2010, when Elizabeth Pitcairn, violinist and alumna of Luzerne Music Center, was named as successor.

== Notable guest artists ==
- Canadian Brass (brass quintet)
- Chris Brubeck (jazz musician)
- Sarah Chang (violinist)
- John Corigliano (composer)
- Corigliano Quartet (string quartet)
- George Crumb (composer)
- Richard Danielpour (composer)
- Dennis Russell Davies (conductor)
- Amanda Harberg (composer)
- Michael Kamen (composer)
- Benny Kim (violinist)
- Robert Lipsett (violinist)
- Yo Yo Ma (cellist)
- Midori (violinist)
- Miró Quartet (string quartet)
- Ricardo Morales (clarinetist)
- Riccardo Muti (conductor)
- Leonard Slatkin (conductor)
- Time for Three (string trio)
- Joan Tower (composer)
- Ying Quartet (string quartet)
