= Lake Lucerne (Polk County, Florida) =

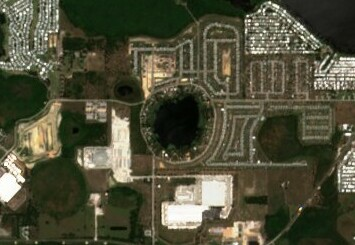
- Satellite image of Lake Lucerne

- Location within Florida Location within the United States
- Location: Lucerne Park, Florida
- Coordinates: 28.0795°N 81.6840°W
- Type: natural freshwater lake
- Basin countries: United States
- Max. length: 1,520 feet (460 m)
- Max. width: 1,260 feet (380 m)
- Surface area: 41.78 acres (17 ha)
- Surface elevation: 128 feet (39 m)

Lake Lucerne, a somewhat round lake, has a surface area of 41.78-acre (169,100 m^{2}). Lake Lucerne is in an area that is rural-suburban in nature. This lake is completely surrounded by residences and a few undeveloped housing lots. Lake Lucerne is northeast of Winter Haven, Florida.

As Lake Lucerne is completely surrounded by private property, there is no public access to this lake. There also is no information about the types of fish in the lake.
