= Lake Lucerne (Wisconsin) =

Lake in the state of Wisconsin, United States

- ésnekagmek (Potawatomi)
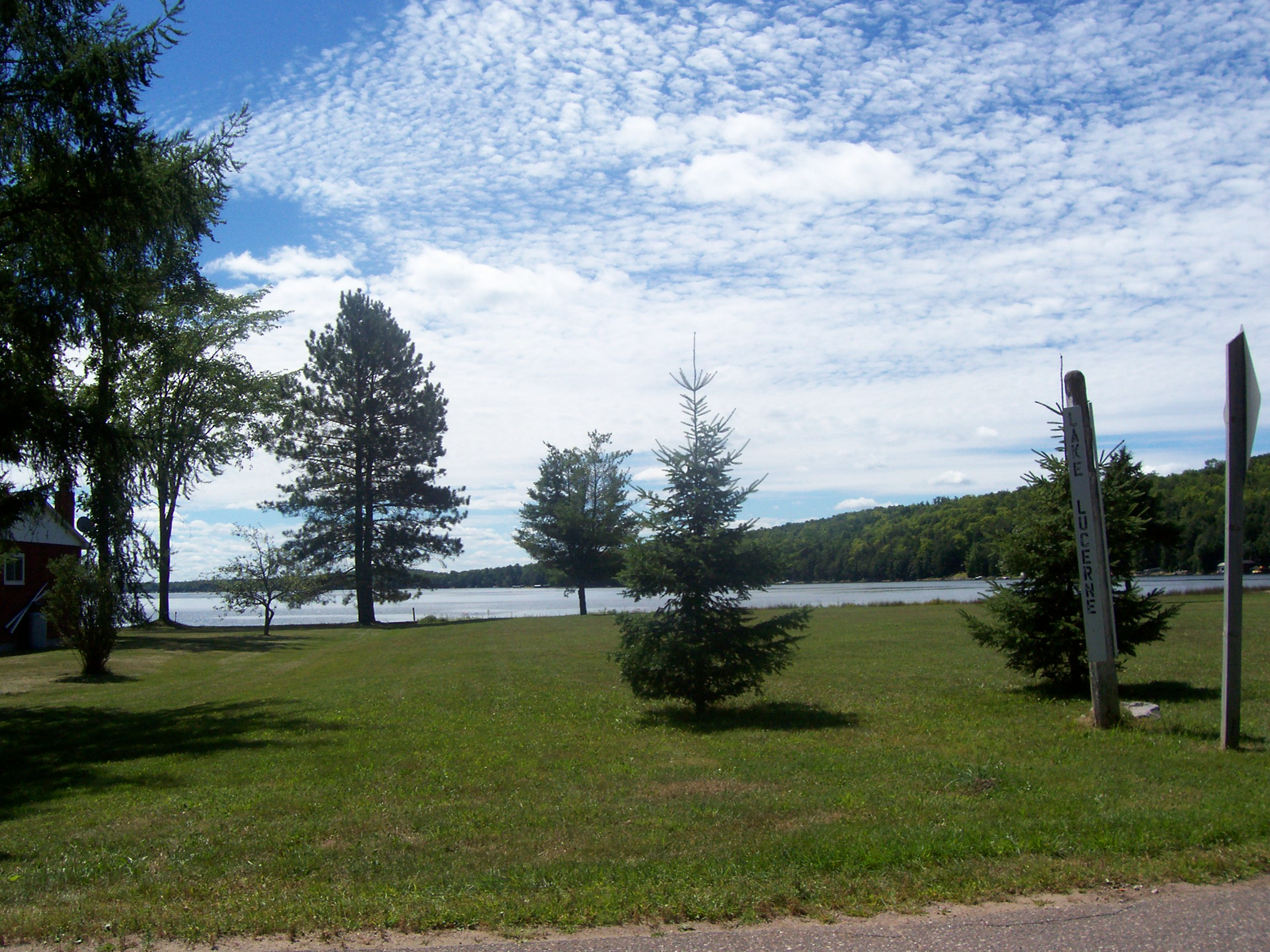
- Looking south from the north end of the lake

- Location within Wisconsin Location within the United States
- Location: Forest County, Wisconsin
- Coordinates: 45°31′57″N 088°50′55″W
- Basin countries: United States
- Max. length: 3 mi (4.8 km)
- Max. width: 0.5 mi (0.80 km)
- Surface area: 1,039 acres (420 ha)
- Max. depth: 70 ft (21 m)
- Surface elevation: 1,644 ft (501 m)

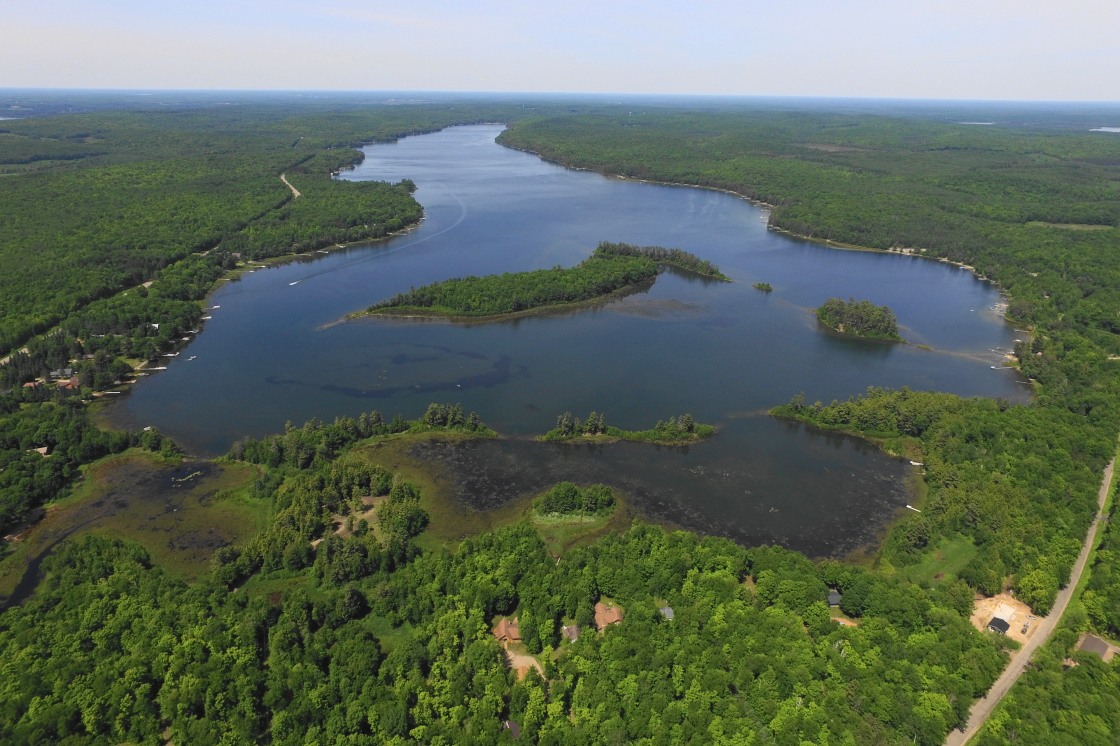
Looking north from the south end of Lake Lucerne.

Lake Lucerne (Potawatomi: ésnekagmek) is located near Crandon in Forest County, Wisconsin, United States. There is a boat landing on the southeastern shore of the lake and a restaurant (Waters Edge) on the western shore. This restaurant performs a water ski show during the summer months. Summer homes and cottages surround the lake. There is a large, uninterrupted stretch of water on the north half of the lake. On the southern half, there is a large cluster of islands, the largest having a sand bar that is popular with swimmers. The southern tip of the lake is dotted with bays and water meadows.
