= Crandon (town), Wisconsin =

Crandon, Wisconsin
- Town
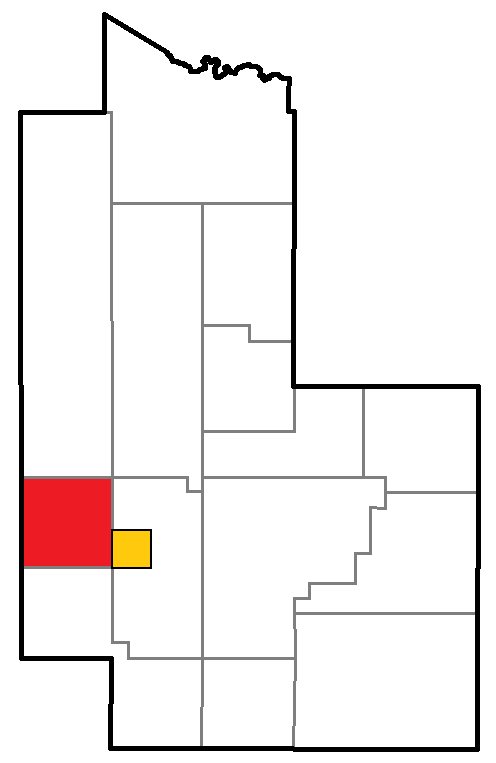
- Location of Crandon, within Forest County
- Coordinates: 45°35′26″N 88°59′37″W
- Country: United States
- State: Wisconsin
- County: Forest

Area
  - Total: 35.8 sq mi (92.7 km^{2})
  - Land: 33.8 sq mi (87.5 km^{2})
  - Water: 2.0 sq mi (5.2 km^{2})
- Elevation: 1,624 ft (495 m)

Population (2020)
  - Total: 606
  - Density: 17.9/sq mi (6.93/km^{2})
- Time zone: UTC-6 (Central (CST))
  - Summer (DST): UTC-5 (CDT)
- Area codes: 715 & 534
- FIPS code: 55-17450
- GNIS feature ID: 1583024

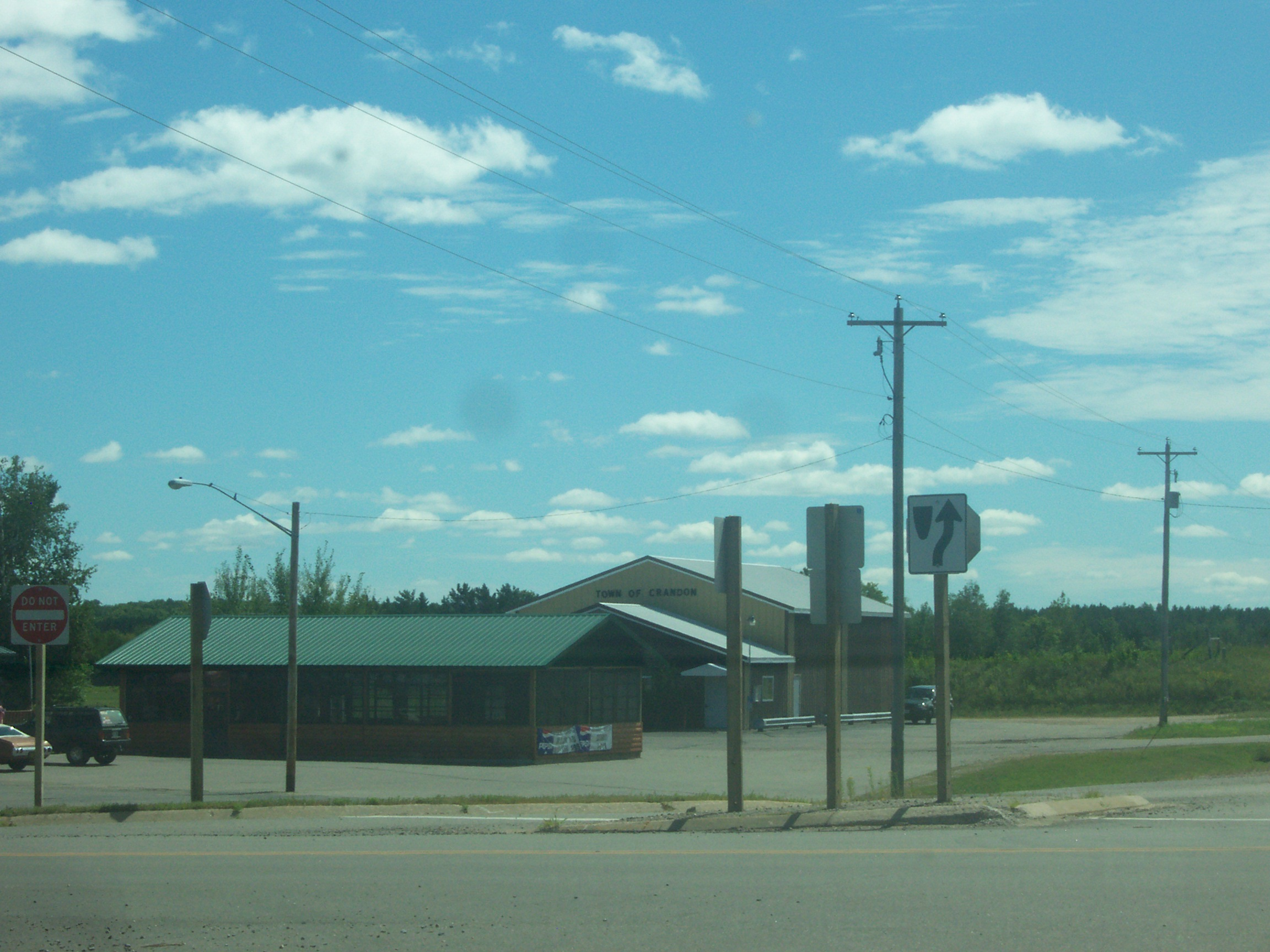
Town hall along U.S. Route 8

Crandon is a town in Forest County, Wisconsin, United States. The population was 606 at the 2020 census. The City of Crandon is located adjacent to the town.

== Geography ==
According to the United States Census Bureau, the town has a total area of 35.8 square miles (93 km^{2}), of which 33.8 square miles (88 km^{2}) is land and 2.0 square miles (5.2 km^{2}), or 5.56%, is water.

== Demographics ==
As of the census of 2000, there were 614 people, 238 households, and 177 families residing in the town. The population density was 18.2 people per square mile (7.0/km^{2}). There were 443 housing units at an average density of 13.1 per square mile (5.1/km^{2}). The racial makeup of the town was 96.91% White, 0.33% Black or African American, 1.63% Native American, and 1.14% from two or more races. 0.33% of the population were Hispanic or Latino of any race.

There were 238 households, out of which 35.7% had children under the age of 18 living with them, 63.0% were married couples living together, 8.4% had a female householder with no husband present, and 25.6% were non-families. 22.3% of all households were made up of individuals, and 10.1% had someone living alone who was 65 years of age or older. The average household size was 2.58 and the average family size was 3.03.

In the town, the population was spread out, with 26.9% under the age of 18, 6.2% from 18 to 24, 30.1% from 25 to 44, 22.8% from 45 to 64, and 14.0% who were 65 years of age or older. The median age was 38 years. For every 100 females, there were 106.7 males. For every 100 females age 18 and over, there were 110.8 males.

The median income for a household in the town was $33,375, and the median income for a family was $37,813. Males had a median income of $28,750 versus $18,984 for females. The per capita income for the town was $14,933. About 9.2% of families and 11.1% of the population were below the poverty line, including 18.1% of those under age 18 and 13.1% of those age 65 or over.

== Transportation ==
=== Airport ===
Crandon is served by the Crandon/Steve Conway Municipal Airport (Y55). Located three miles southwest of the city, the airport handles approximately 30,600 operations per year, with roughly 91% general aviation and 9% air taxi. The airport has a 3,550 foot asphalt runway with approved GPS approaches (Runway 12–30).
