= Crandon Municipal Airport =

Airport in Wisconsin, United States

Crandon Municipal Airport Steve Conway Municipal Airport
- IATA: none; ICAO: none; FAA LID: Y55

Summary
- Airport type: Public
- Owner: City of Crandon
- Serves: Crandon, Wisconsin
- Opened: September 1958
- Time zone: CST (UTC−06:00)
  - Summer (DST): CDT (UTC−05:00)
- Elevation AMSL: 1,650 ft (500 m)
- Coordinates: 45°31′22″N 088°55′42″W

Map
- Location of airport in Wisconsin Y55 (the United States)

Runways
Direction	Length		Surface
Direction	ft	m	Surface
12/30	3,550	1,082	Asphalt
1/19	2,742	836	Turf

Statistics
- Aircraft operations (2023): 4,400
- Based aircraft (2024): 8
- Source: Federal Aviation Administration

Crandon Municipal Airport, also known as Steve Conway Municipal Airport, (FAA LID: Y55) is a city owned public use airport located 3 miles (5 km) southwest of the central business district of Crandon, a city in Forest County, Wisconsin, United States. It is included in the Federal Aviation Administration (FAA) National Plan of Integrated Airport Systems for 2025–2029, in which it is categorized as a basic general aviation facility.

Although most airports in the United States use the same three-letter location identifier for the FAA and International Air Transport Association (IATA), this airport is assigned Y55 by the FAA but has no designation from the IATA.

== Facilities and aircraft ==
Crandon Municipal Airport covers an area of 259 acres (105 ha) at an elevation of 1650 feet (503 m) above mean sea level. It has two runways: 12/30 is 3,550 by 75 feet (1,082 x 23 m) with an asphalt surface and 1/19 is 2,742 by 100 feet (836 x 30 m) with a turf surface.

For the 12-month period ending August 10, 2023, the airport had 4,400 aircraft operations, an average of 12 per day: 91% general aviation and 9% air taxi.

In August 2024, there were 8 aircraft based at this airport: 7 single-engine and 1 multi-engine.

2016 Improvement project: Between January and June 2016, the airport completed a $70,000 improvement project that was approved by Governor Scott Walker. The first part of the project was the construction of a six bay T-hangar. The airport was shut down for a few days in June to complete crack filling work on all pavements.

== See also ==
- List of airports in Wisconsin
