= Lake Luzerne (New York) =

- Ti-o-sa-ron-da
- Location within New York Location within the United States
- Location: Warren County, New York, United States
- Coordinates: 43°19′24″N 73°50′00″W
- Type: Lake
- Etymology: Anne-César de La Luzerne
- Primary inflows: Towner Brook
- Primary outflows: Hudson River
- Basin countries: United States
- Surface area: 111 acres (0.45 km^{2})
- Average depth: 24 feet (7.3 m)
- Max. depth: 52 feet (16 m)
- Shore length^{1}: 2.7 miles (4.3 km)
- Surface elevation: 623 feet (190 m)
- Islands: 1
- Settlements: Lake Luzerne, New York
- ^{1} Shore length is not a well-defined measure.

Lake Luzerne is located in the town of Lake Luzerne, New York. Fish species present in the lake are northern pike, smallmouth bass, largemouth bass, rainbow trout, brown trout, rock bass, bluegill, yellow perch, pumpkinseed sunfish, brown bullhead, and chain pickerel. There is a boat launch on the west shore off County Route 9.

The lake contains multiple beaches available to the public including Wayside Beach. Ice fishing tournaments occur in the wintertime and vehicles can be driven on the ice.

A small bridge is located just near the beach where people will jump off into the water. This is dangerous because the water is not very deep in this location.

Ivy Island is the sole island in the lake. Access to the island is prohibited without permission from the town of Lake Luzerne. A trespassing fine of $250 has been imposed. According to local lore, the island is so named because of the presence of poison ivy.
