= Lake Luzerne, New York =

Lake Luzerne
- Town
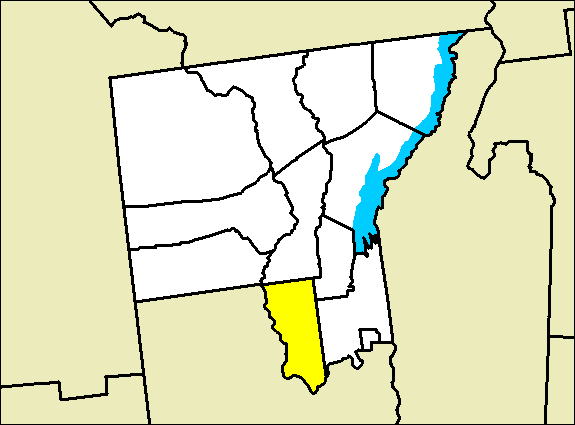
- Location of Lake Luzerne in Warren County

- Location within the state of New York
- Coordinates: 43°19′9″N 73°49′30″W
- Country: United States
- State: New York
- County: Warren
- Established: 1792

Government
  - Supervisor: Eugene Merlino

Area
  - Total: 54.06 sq mi (140.01 km^{2})
  - Land: 52.52 sq mi (136.02 km^{2})
  - Water: 1.54 sq mi (3.99 km^{2})
- Elevation: 1,191 ft (363 m)

Population (2020)
  - Total: 3,079
  - Density: 58.63/sq mi (22.64/km^{2})
- Time zone: UTC-5 (Eastern (EST))
  - Summer (DST): UTC-4 (EDT)
- ZIP code: 12846
- Area code: 518
- FIPS code: 36-40662
- GNIS feature ID: 0979128
- Website: http://www.townoflakeluzerne.com/

Lake Luzerne, formerly the Town of Fairfield and then Luzerne, is a town in southern Warren County, New York, United States. The town is located within the Adirondack Park. The town is part of the Glens Falls Metropolitan Statistical Area. Lake Luzerne is west of the city of Glens Falls. The town population was 3,079 at the 2020 census.

== History ==
The area received its first permanent European settlers around 1770. The town of Lake Luzerne was set off from the town of Queensbury in 1792 as the Town of Fairfield. The town is named after Anne-César, Chevalier de la Luzerne, who guaranteed a personal loan to provide food to American revolutionary troops and who served as a French Minister to the new country.

Perspective map of Luzerne and Hadley, New York with list of landmarks from 1888 by L.R. Burleigh

In 1808, the town changed its name to Luzerne and in 1963 to Lake Luzerne.

== Features ==
The town is known for its Adirondack Folk School, with classes designed to keep the arts, crafts and culture of the Adirondacks alive , and for the Lake Luzerne Chamber Music Festival. Every year, children from across the world compete to participate in music camps at the Luzerne Music Center, where free concerts are offered to the public.

Woodward Hall was listed on the National Register of Historic Places in 2014.

Lake Luzerne is also the home of the award winning Nettle Meadow Cheese Shop offering Kunik cheese and the Double "H" Ranch, founded by Charles R. Wood and the actor, Paul Newman to offer programs and year-round support for children and their families dealing with life-threatening illnesses.

== Geography ==
According to the United States Census Bureau, the town has a total area of 54.1 square miles (140 km^{2}), of which 52.6 square miles (136 km^{2}) is land and 1.4 square miles (3.6 km^{2}) (2.66%) is water.

The southern and western town lines are the border of Saratoga County and the Hudson River. The northern town boundary is the border with the town of Warrensburg. The eastern town line is the border with the towns of Queensbury and Lake George.

Just north of the bridge across the Hudson, to Hadley, is the narrowest point of the entire Hudson River, Rockwell Falls. Just to the south is where the Sacandaga River meets the Hudson.

== Demographics ==
Historical population
Census	Pop.	Note	%±
1820	1,430		—
1830	1,362		−4.8%
1840	1,284		−5.7%
1850	1,300		1.2%
1860	1,328		2.2%
1870	1,174		−11.6%
1880	1,438		22.5%
1890	1,679		16.8%
1900	1,341		−20.1%
1910	1,185		−11.6%
1920	1,018		−14.1%
1930	1,150		13.0%
1940	1,251		8.8%
1950	1,426		14.0%
1960	1,830		28.3%
1970	2,174		18.8%
1980	2,672		22.9%
1990	2,816		5.4%
2000	3,219		14.3%
2010	3,347		4.0%
2020	3,079		−8.0%
U.S. Decennial Census

As of the census of 2000, there were 3,219 people, 1,264 households, and 883 families residing in the town. The population density was 61.2 inhabitants per square mile (23.6/km^{2}). There were 1,949 housing units at an average density of 37.0 per square mile (14.3/km^{2}). The racial makeup of the town was 97.79% White, 0.25% African American, 0.34% Native American, 0.28% Asian, 0.22% from other races, and 1.12% from two or more races. Hispanic or Latino of any race were 1.03% of the population.

There were 1,264 households, out of which 31.9% had children under the age of 18 living with them, 57.4% were married couples living together, 8.6% had a female householder with no husband present, and 30.1% were non-families. 23.7% of all households were made up of individuals, and 9.7% had someone living alone who was 65 years of age or older. The average household size was 2.54 and the average family size was 2.99.

In the town, the population was spread out, with 24.9% under the age of 18, 6.8% from 18 to 24, 29.7% from 25 to 44, 25.1% from 45 to 64, and 13.6% who were 65 years of age or older. The median age was 38 years. For every 100 females, there were 98.0 males. For every 100 females age 18 and over, there were 96.7 males.

The median income for a household in the town was $36,348, and the median income for a family was $40,104. Males had a median income of $30,152 versus $20,654 for females. The per capita income for the town was $16,246. About 7.7% of families and 10.3% of the population were below the poverty line, including 16.1% of those under age 18 and 6.9% of those age 65 or over.

== Communities and locations ==
- Beartown – A hamlet in the eastern part of the town.
- Danielstown – A hamlet in the southern part of the town in the vicinity of Daniels Road and County Route 32 (Call Street).
- Fourth Lake – A hamlet west of a lake by the same name and north of Lake Luzerne hamlet on Route 9N.
- Fourth Lake – A lake located east of the hamlet of Fourth Lake.
- Hartman – A hamlet in the southern part of the town, east of Danielstown, in the vicinity of Hartman Loop and County Route 32 (Call Street).
- Hudson Grove - A hamlet along the Hudson River, south of Lake Luzerne hamlet.
- Lake Luzerne – A hamlet on the east bank of the Hudson River on Route 9N. It is southwest of a lake by the same name on the western side of town. This hamlet has ZIP code 12846.
- Lake Luzerne – A lake located by the hamlet of Lake Luzerne.
- Lake Vanare – A hamlet east of Fourth Lake on Route 9N. The hamlet is in the vicinity of two bodies of water, named Lake Forest and Lake Vanare.
- Luzerne Heights (or "The Heights") – A community inhabited by numerous seasonal residents, off Pierpont Road.
