= Marica Stanković =

Croatian schoolteacher, Catholic activist and Servant of God (1900–1957)

Servant of God Marica Stanković
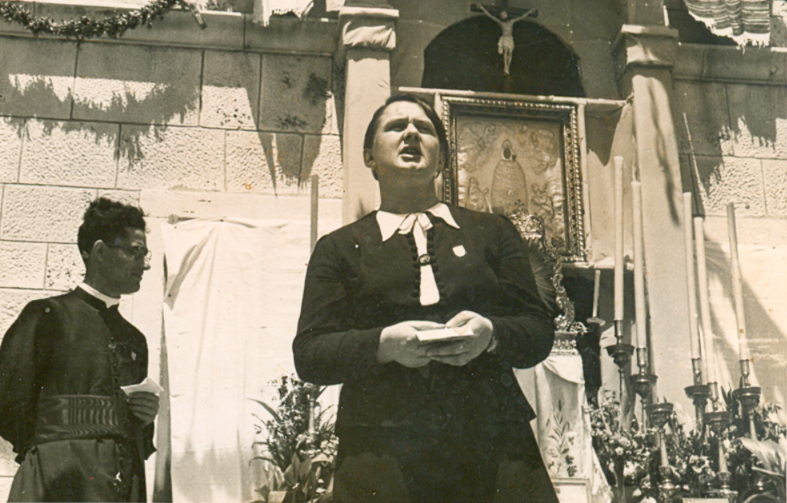
- Born: 31 December 1900; Zagreb
- Died: 8 October 1957 (aged 56); Zagreb
- Burial place: Mirogoj
- Other name: Marija
- Education: Higher Pedagogical Academy (today Faculty of Teacher Education)
- Occupations: schoolteacher, social activist, writer
- Years active: 1920–1957
- Organization(s): Association of Croatian Female Eagles; Grand Crusader Sisterhood
- Known for: founder of the Associates of Christ the King
- Movement: Croatian Catholic Movement
- Awards: Pro Ecclesia et Pontifice (1942)
- Website: https://maricastankovic.hr/

Marica (Marija) Stanković (born Vragović; 31 December 1900 – 8 October 1957), known as "Sister Marica" (Croatian: Sestra Marica), was a Croatian school teacher, writer, Catholic layperson and founder of the Associates of Christ the King (Suradnice Krista Kralja). Along with Ivan Merz, she was among the most prominent members and initiators of Catholic movements in Croatia in the first half of the 20th century. Since October 2006, she is considered as a Servant of God.

== Life ==
=== Early years and education ===
Stanković was born on 31 December 1900 in Zagreb, in a Vragović family. She was baptised in a St. Mark's Church on 1 January 1901. She attended Sisters of Mercy's preparatory school, where she was also a member of the Congregation of Mary. Stanković started publishing her first literary works and articles in various Catholic magazines at the age of 18. She studied Croatian language and history at the Higher Pedagogical Academy (today Faculty of Teacher Education) in Zagreb.

In 1920, she became acquainted with the ideas of the Catholic lay movement, especially of the Croatian Catholic Movement led by bishop Antun Mahnić and his motto "Croatia reborn in Christ". At the gathering of the European Orao Youth in Maribor, where she represented her school, she met Ivan Merz and that encounter changed her spiritual life:

Only with the arrival of Dr. Merz from Paris, my more or less traditional and rhetorical Christian life slowly became influenced by the richness of his Catholic culture, and even more by the intuitive feeling that Merz is a soul in which God manifests in a special way, deeper, more intense, more powerful, more penetrating, more radical.

=== Teaching, social and Catholic activities ===
In 1921, she was employed as a teacher in Sračinec near Varaždin. In 1923 she moved to Donja Voća. In 1924, she changes her family name from Vragović to Stanković. In 1925, she enrolled at the Higher Pedagogical School in Zagreb. At the general gathering in Šibenik, the Association of Croatian Female Eagles was founded, and Marica joined the first committee as an educational officer. In 1926, she became the editor-in-chief of the monthly magazine Za vjeru i dom (hr) of the Congregation of Teachers in Zagreb, a position she held until 1945. At the pilgrimage of the Association of Croatian Female Eagles' members in Rome in 1926, she visited lay institute Opera Cardinal Ferrari where she got to know the principles and activities of the Catholic Action. After two years of studying at the Higher Pedagogical School, in 1927 she went to Slatina as a teacher at a civil school. At the Association of Croatian Female Eagles' assembly in Sarajevo, she was elected president.

In 1929, she continues her studies at the Higher Pedagogical School and goes to Prague on the general gathering of Eagles. That year, by the degree of the Alexander I, all gymnastics societies were abolished, except for the pro-regime Yugoslav Falcon (Sokol), and so were Croatian male (HOS) and female Eagles (SHO). In 1930, she was elected as a leader of Grand Crusader Sisterhood, female branch of the Crusaders organisation founded on the principles of Eagleship in 1930. In 1931, she graduated and started working as a teacher in Čakovec. In 1933, she was moved to Gračac and then in Kutina, and in 1935 in Zagreb.

In 1938, she participates with six female colleagues in the Crusaders' workshop and eight-day spiritual exercies in Banja Luka on the occasion the 10th anniversary of Merz's death. At the encouragement of fr. Tomislav Poglajen, who came from Belgium where he collaborated with organisation of Catholic workers (JOC), she dedicated exercies to discernment on her ideas about lay organisation. During the exercises, she wrote a draft of the Rules and the name of the future institute was proposed. Returning to Zagreb, she presented her ideas to cardinal Alojzije Stepinac. She attributed the foundation of the institute to the influence of Ivan Merz in her life.

In 1942, she was awarded Pro Ecclesia et Pontifice for her work in promoting the Catholic Action.

In 1944, she published book Mladost vedrine ("The youth of serenity").

=== Persecution, arrest and trial ===
Following the establishment of SFRY after the Second World War, Catholic Church in Croatia faced persecutions. Crusaders' organisation was dissolved in 1945. On 2 June 1945, new communist authorities convened a gathering of educators in the hall of the Chamber of Workers in Zagreb, led by Marko Belinić and with around 2500 participants. Along with teacher Marija Grgić, Stanković was the only one who stood up to defend archbishop Stepinac:

I protest on behalf of the Catholic public against such slander. Such slander against the one who thundered from the pulpit against those who persecuted the Jews and the Orthodox, who converted his flower garden into a shelter for children whose parents were dragged to the camps, who admonishes the Catholics of the city of Zagreb to go to Jerome's Hall to collect the children of the persecuted and shelter them in their houses, that death may not overtake them. There are a large number of people present, who can confirm this and thank their friends for their life. Alojzije Stepinac. That's why I say with disgust three times: phew, phew, phew – to allow such slanders to be made at a meeting of the elite of the city of Zagreb, at a meeting of educators.

During 1947, nine female members of the former Catholic Action and its priest Ante Radić were arrested. Stanković was arrested on 1 September 1947. Before her arrest, she spent eight days on spiritual exercises in a Carmelite monastery in Brezovica. After a six-month pretrial detention, a show trial at the District Court in Zagreb took place on 24 and 25 January 1948. To the accusations of collaboration with the "enemy of the people", she replied:

I strongly deny that the Crusadership was any form of Ustasha activity. It's a lie and a hoax. Likewise, to see some kind of Ustasha conception in my work is to be malicious. I repeat, my only conception of life is Jesus Christ, His teaching and His Gospel and nothing else. (...) All my work was aimed at preserving faith and strengthening faith in the souls of the youth. I never had political conceptions.

After her address was interrupted, she concluded her defense with the following words:

When I can't say everything I want, I end with those slogans that I have served all my life: 'Long live Christ the King! Long live St. Father Pope! Long live Christian Europe!'

She was sentenced to five years in the women's prison camp in Požega. After the verdict was read, she sang the chorale with eight other defendants: Christus vincit, Christus regnat, Christus imperat!

=== Imprisonment ===
On 1 April 1948, she was taken from the prison in Zagreb to the Penitentiary home for women in Požega to serve her sentence. She was forced to work on drainage of the Lonjsko polje. She wrote memories on her prison days in a book Godine teške i bolne ("Difficult and painful years"), published posthumously. While she was in prison, her associates worked on canonical recognition of the Association.

In a letter from prison in 1951 to her Associates of Christ the King in Zagreb she wrote: "It is much easier to live, you can cope with much more and you look at life in a completely different way, if there is joy within us... Joy is not outside of us. Joy is in us, if God is in us. Such joy cannot be lost. No one can stifle her growth..."

=== Canonical recognition, illness and death ===
While she was still in prison, on May 18, 1951, the Congregation of monks distributed their "let it be founded" to her at the hands of the ordinary sede impedíto Salis-Seewis. After serving her sentence, she left the camp on 1 September 1952. On the same day, in the parish church in Požega, she made confession and received Eucharist first time after five years. The next day, she arrives in Zagreb and settles in the house of her associates in Hrastovac. She devoted herself to harmonizing the organization's Rules with the guidelines of the Holy See's documents on the lay institutes Provida Mater Ecclesia and Primo Feliciter. Cardinal Stepinac supported her efforts in letters he wrote from house arrest in Krašić.

On 18 October 1953, lay institute Associates of Christ the King was canonically established; the Rules were approved without changes, the Holy See recognized the episcopal significance of the institution, and the archbishop of Zagreb was appointed as ordinary. Following the establishment, she writes texts for the life and work of the Associates. In February 1955, she also completed her prison records. At the end of the year, her health rapidly deteriorates and she has to go to the hospital. In 1956, she wrote a commentary on the Rules.

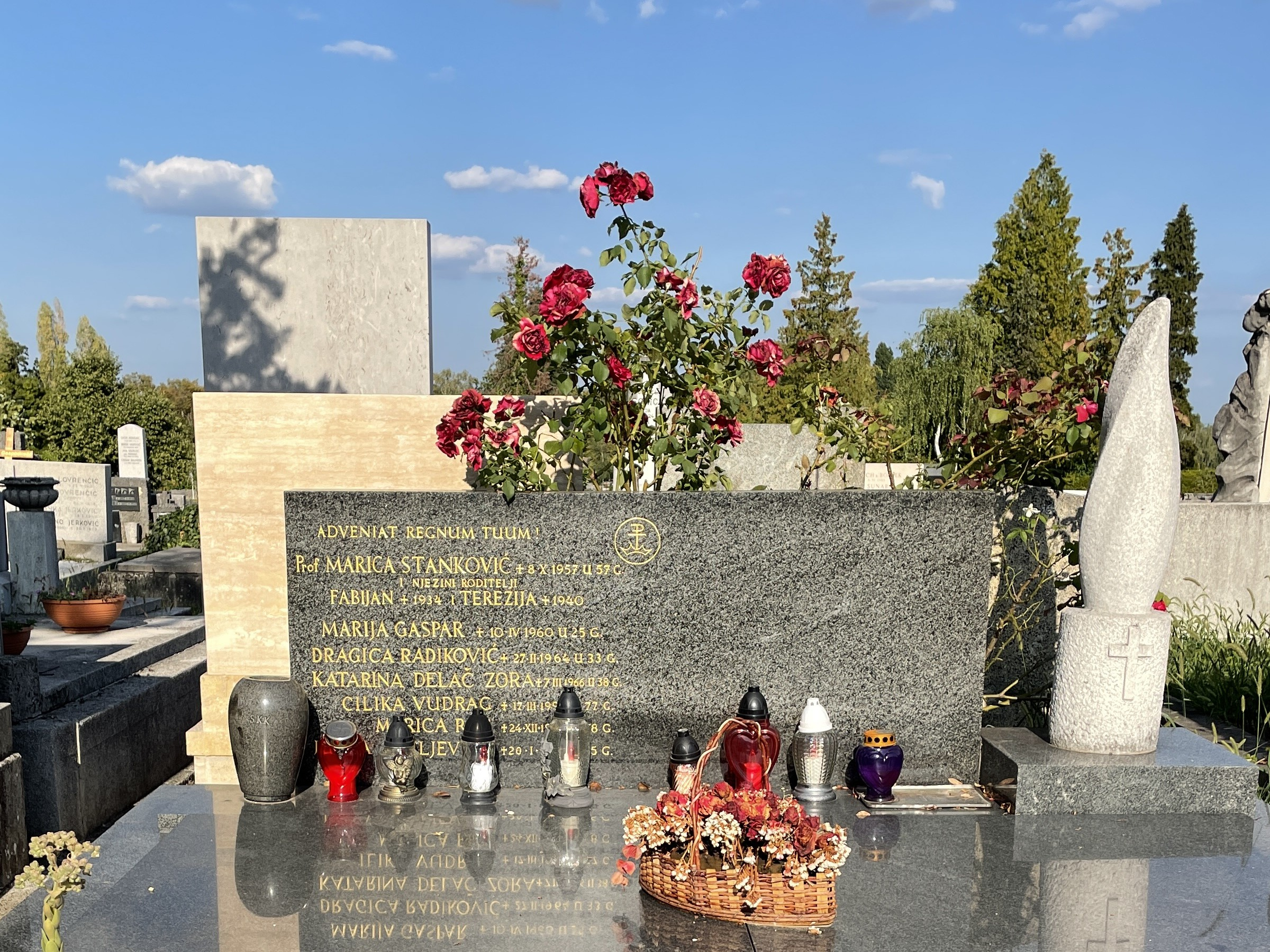
Marica Stanković's grave at the Mirogoj Cemetery.

At the beginning of 1957, her health deteriorated again. On 8 October, she died surrounded by her colleagues in her room in Hrastovac. She was buried on 11 October at Mirogoj. At the funeral, her wish from her will was fulfilled: "If the church authorities allow, let one girl wear my papal decoration on a pillow in front of my coffin. I would also like my funeral to be a silent manifestation to the Pope." The funeral rites were led by archbishop Franjo Šeper.

In the speech at the funeral, Rev. Ivan Kozelj said:

With Marica, a great, bright, above all unusually strong and rich character of a Christian girl and woman, such as one rarely meets in life, disappears among us... Her life is built up, deeply woven and inextricably linked to the most beautiful and fruitful happened in Croatian Catholicism in the last half century... Sister Marica, along with Dr. Merz, was the strongest supporter and initiator of the Catholic movement in Croatia. With kindness and love, she won the hearts of our youth for the Divine Teacher and King. She was not motivated by any earthly or personal motives, but by a living and deep faith in Christ. Sister Marica was asked by her Master in a very sensitive way to suffer for Him and His Kingdom. She remained heroically faithful to Him even in suffering and carrying the cross!

== Beatification ==
Even before the start of the official procedure, cardinal Franjo Kuharić proclaimed her publicly as a Servant of God. The Croatian Bishops' Conference appointed Milan Pušec as postulator for her cause in 2005. After receiving the declaration of nihil obstat by the Congregation for the Causes of Saints in Rome on 10 June 2006, Archbishop of Zagreb Josip Bozanić published a declaration on the cause on 19 October 2006 and opened the process for her beatification on 16 November 2006. Since 2008, postulature publishes a magazine Poruka vedrine about Stanković's life and work and with news on her beatification procedure. Vinko Mamić, OCD was named as a new postulator on 31 October 2011.

== Remembrance ==
- Annual "Marica Stanković's Days" (Dani Marice Stanković) are held in Madžarevo and Novi Marof since 2015.

== Literature ==
- Ceraj, Saša (2016). "Povijesni razvoj i važnost djelovanja hrvatskoga Orlovstva" [The Historical Development and Importance of the Activities of Croatian Eagles]. Obnovljeni Život (in Croatian). 71 (1): 39–53. ISSN 0351-3947.
- Tuškan, Slavica (1997). "Ivan Merz, Marica Stanković i zajednica Suradnica Krista Kralja" [Ivan Merz, Marica Stankovič and the group The Associates of Christ the King]. Obnovljeni Život (in Croatian). 52 (3/4): 315–324. ISSN 0351-3947.
- Tahmina, Stella (2006). Marica Stanković (1900–1957): životopis i bibliografija [Marica Stanković (1900–1957): biography and bibliography] (in Croatian). Zagreb: Kršćanska sadašnjost. ISBN 9789531101899.
