= Durairaj =

Durairaj is a surname, usually for male and found predominantly in Tamil Nadu in India, meaning Emperor or King. Notable people with the surname include:

- C. Durairaj (?–2014), Indian politician
- Nandha Durairaj (born 1977), Indian actor
- Ramachandran Durairaj (born 1976), Indian actor
- T. S. Durairaj (1910–1986), Indian comedian, drama artist, producer, and director
- Manoj Durairaj (1971–), Indian heart surgeon, Pune, awarded Pro Ecclesia et Pontifice
- Scott Durairaj (1971 -) National Health Service National Director, leading on health inequalities and improvement. Awarded the Covid star for outstanding leadership and research during the COVID pandemic.
