= Catherine Bonifas =

Catholic philanthropist in Upper Michigan

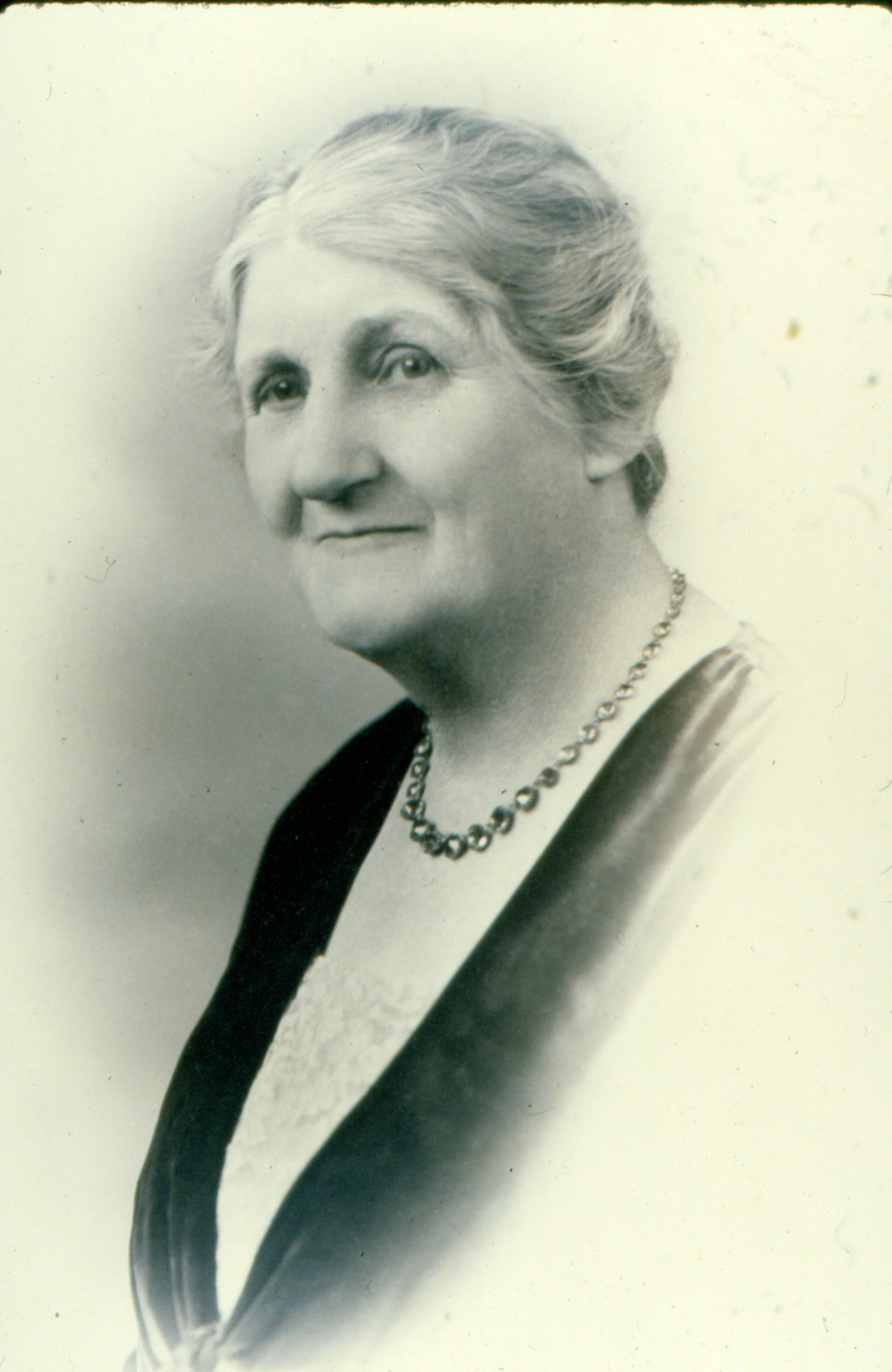
- Society of Architectural Historians Archipedia.
- Born: May 15, 1864; County Carlow, Ireland
- Died: May 25, 1948 (aged 84); Escanaba, MI
- Resting place: Holy Cross Cemetery
- Occupation: Philanthropist
- Spouse: William Bonifas
- Awards: Pro Ecclesia et Pontifice

Catherine Nolan Bonifas (1864 – 1948) was an early resident and major benefactor of the city of Escanaba in the Upper Peninsula of Michigan.

== Biography ==
Catherine Nolan was born on May 15, 1864, in County Carlow, Ireland. She was born to a Catholic family and remained a devout believer throughout her life. As a teenager in a poor family, Catherine immigrated to Michigan after finding a job as a maid at a logging camp on Garden Peninsula.

=== Marriage ===
Her future husband William Bonifas was born on May 9, 1864, in Beringen, Luxembourg, just six days before her own birth in Ireland. Bill migrated to the United States with very little money and quickly became a lumberjack in the Upper Peninsula, ending up at the same logging camp where Catherine worked as a maid. The two were married in 1894.

The couple founded the William Bonifas Logging Company soon after, buying 40 acres of timberland in hopes of supplying Kimberly-Clark Paper Company in Neenah, Wisconsin. After watching Kimberly-Clark sell his wood to General Motors for use as the wooden panels on their station wagons, William Bonifas purchased stock in both General Motors and Kimberly-Clark before 1900.

In 1899, the couple opened their home to a young schoolteacher named Mary E. Hogan who had moved to the area to teach at a country school on the Garden Peninsula. The local priest introduced her to the Bonifases as she needed room and board, and the couple readily agreed to take her in. Catherine quickly hired her to manage their logging company's financials after noticing her intelligence and organizational skills, as William was illiterate. Mary became an integral part of the company for decades, residing with Catherine and William for the majority of her time there. Notably, she advised William in what eventually became the most successful business venture of his life: investing in International Cellucotton Products Corporation, the creators of Kleenex and Kotex. That investment alone increased the Bonifas fortune more than their own company or any other partnership or investment. Though it cannot be confirmed for certain, her relationship with Mary E. Hogan likely led to Catherine's later decision to designate a sizable portion of her fortune to the construction of an elementary school in Garden.

The couple sold the William Bonifas Logging Company to Kimberly-Clark in 1927 for $250,000, and William became their Vice President of Timber Operations. As they got older, Catherine and Bill Bonifas were known for wintering in Miami Beach, Florida, to avoid the cold weather. William Bonifas retired in June 1936, approximately five months before he died.

=== Bonifas Lodge ===
In 1910, the William Bonifas Logging Company expanded west to Watersmeet and Marenisco and founded the company town of Bonifas nearby. The small settlement still exists, just north of Watersmeet in Ottawa National Forest. A small creek nearby is known as Bonifas Creek.

The couple purchased land on Lake Gogebic in the early 1920s, officially completing work on the "Bonifas Lodge" in 1927 for a total cost of $75,000. William built the lodge himself, using hardwood from his sawmill in Marenisco before a road to his property had been built, so all of the logs had to be slid across the ice and floated across the lake. The property stretches across a mile of Lake Gogebic and features a three-acre trout pond, four cabins, a boathouse, an art studio, and a workshop, in addition to the 15,000 sq. ft. lodge.

Shortly after construction was completed, William and Catherine hosted the DuPonts at Bonifas Lodge. Other early guests to the property included Henry Ford, Thomas Edison, and Harvey S. Firestone. Though William died in 1936 before getting much use out of the property, Catherine entertained there until the end of her life, as Bonifas Lodge had accommodations for more than twenty guests.

=== Philanthropy ===
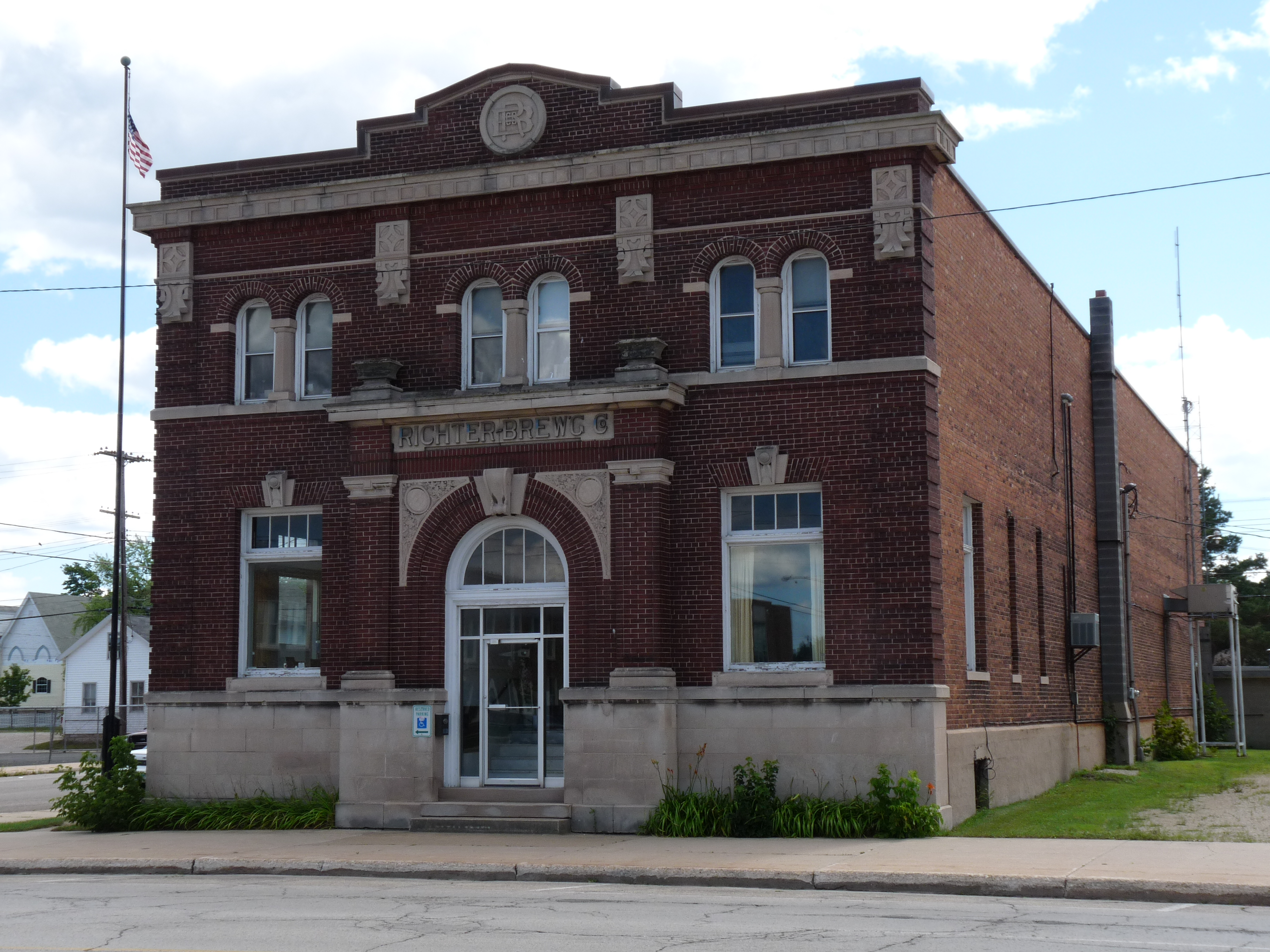
Richter Brewing Co. building, once home of the Catherine Bonifas Technical School, Escanaba, Michigan.

The couple had no children, allowing them to liberally share their wealth as they saw fit. In 1909, they contributed funds to the creation of a new town newspaper. Originally called The Morning Press due to its delivery time, the publication was renamed The Escanaba Daily Press after pushing back delivery times in 1922. The paper became simply The Daily Press in 1978 to reflect their expansion to other counties. The Daily Press continues to operate in Escanaba today as the primary newspaper for Delta, Schoolcraft, and Menominee Counties.

The couple were the major financiers behind the construction of St. Joseph Catholic Church in Escanaba, which merged with another local church to form St. Joesph & St. Patrick Parish in 1997. William had passed by the time construction on the new building he had funded was completed on August 6, 1939. In 1938, Catherine funded the construction of a new gymnasium and auditorium for St. Joseph's parochial school in Escanaba. Originally named in honor of her husband, the Kasota limestone building was repurposed as the Bonifas Fine Arts Center in 1974 after the closure of the school. Renovations to the building in the decades since have resulted in a completely different layout than was originally intended which features art studios, a pair of climate-controlled galleries, and a pottery workshop. The original auditorium has since become a modern theater that supports the community's only theater organization, the Players de Noc. The entire building is barrier-free, offering a modern elevator for those with mobility needs.

Catherine Bonifas purchased an old hospital building and the surrounding 40 acres of forest in Garden in the 1940s. She gifted the entire property to the Roman Catholic Diocese of Marquette in 1947, hoping they would be able to utilize it as a spiritual retreat center. The Marygrove Retreat Center was a retreat for local Catholics from 1949 until 2019, when it was purchased and renamed after a private sale.

Throughout her lifetime, Catherine donated more than $80,000 to the Escanaba School District. She oversaw the creation of the Catherine Bonifas Technical School, housed in the historic Richter Brewing Co. Brew House on Ludington Street in Escanaba. The technical school was part of the public school system for many years, providing post-secondary education in courses like mechanics, fabrication, printing, and more. The school was in operation as late as 1957.

=== Recognition ===
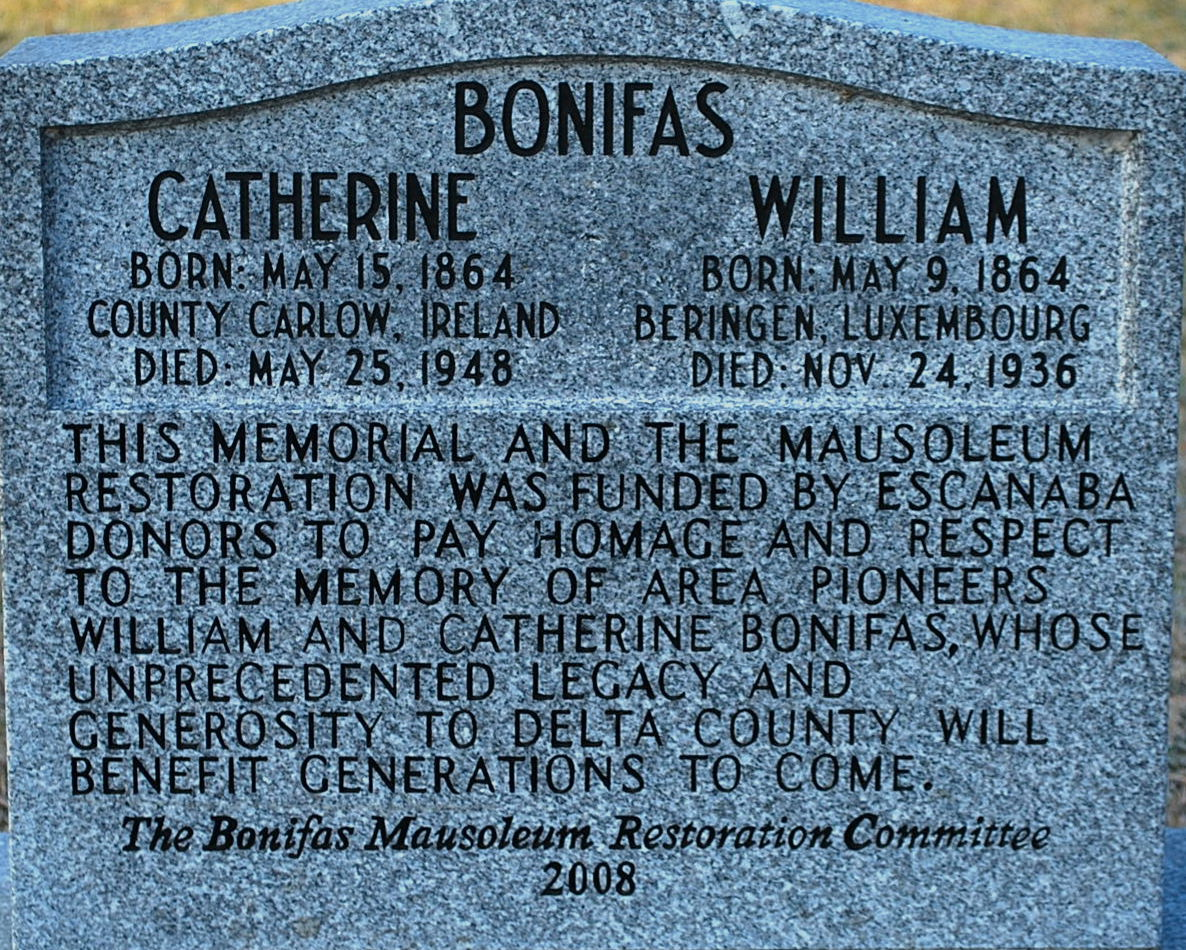
William and Catherine Bonifas Mausoleum Restoration Memorial, Holy Cross Cemetery, Escanaba.

On February 21, 1939, The Daily Press announced that Pope Pius XI had recognized Catherine Bonifas' generosity shortly before his death. The Holy See awarded her with the Pro Ecclesia et Pontifice, an award given to outstanding laypeople and clergy and the highest honor available to Catholic women at the time. The Pope bestowed the award upon Catherine for her and William's donations for "the cause of religion in the diocese."

=== Death ===
Catherine Bonifas died at her home in Escanaba on May 25, 1948. Her funeral services were held in the cemetery chapel that she had funded at Holy Cross Cemetery.

Despite designating $50,000 for the express purpose of the Bonifas mausoleum's maintenance in her will, the facility needed repair by the early 2000s. In 2008, members of the Bonifas Mausoleum Restoration Committee unveiled the freshly restored mausoleum alongside a new memorial stone in Holy Cross Cemetery in Escanaba. Written on the stone is a message that reads, "This memorial and the mausoleum restoration was funded by Escanaba donors to pay homage and respect to the memory of area pioneers William and Catherine Bonifas, whose unprecedented legacy and generosity to Delta County will benefit generations to come."

== Legacy ==
The will and testament of Catherine Bonifas was unsealed and publicized on May 29, 1948, with the surprise of the event garnering enough attention to make the front page of the local newspaper that day. It was revealed that Catherine Bonifas had left $2.45 million, equivalent to $30 million in 2022, to various projects in the Escanaba area and beyond. An article published in The Daily Press at the time of Catherine's death said the following about the Bonifas' legacy:

"The name of Bonifas will live long in the annals of Michigan and Wisconsin history, not alone because of the success achieved by Mr. Bonifas, but because of the many philanthropies that have been made available through Mrs. Bonifas. Some people die and are soon forgotten because they leave nothing constructive designed for the welfare of human beings. Not so with Mr. and Mrs. Bonifas. Mr. Bonifas worked hard amassing an immense fortune, and after his death the one ambition of his widow was to give in his name."

— Charles E. Broughton, Aiding Humanity, The Daily Press, June 4, 1948

=== Donations ===
Catherine Bonifas was heavily invested in advancing her community's cultural, religious, and educational offerings both in her life and after her death. Numerous monuments and buildings have been dedicated in her and her husband's honor.

==== Religious ====
She voiced what she viewed as the need for a new, centrally located Catholic high school in Escanaba by leaving $600,000 of her fortune to the Diocese of Marquette to construct such a facility. The diocese announced its plans to build a new $1.1 million Catholic high school several years later in the early 1950s, easily raising the second half of the necessary funds after notifying parishioners of her donation. Holy Name Catholic High School was opened in the fall of 1954, with the first year's total enrollment exceeding 400 students.

Bonifas bequeathed an additional $100,000 to the diocese, designated for the creation of a Catholic retirement home. The Bishop Noa Home for Senior Citizens opened its doors under the supervision of the Sisters of Saint Paul of Chartres in 1963 and remains in operation today. The facility now primarily serves as a physical rehabilitation center and nursing home that offers daily religious services for residents. In addition to monetary gifts, she donated the Bonifas home to the diocese. The residence on Lakeshore Drive in Escanaba was to be used as "a headquarters for priests engaged in home mission work in the Upper Peninsula."

The following is a list of religious recipients of Catherine Bonifas' generosity, located in the Escanaba area unless otherwise noted.

- Holy Name Catholic School
- St. Joseph Catholic Church
- Holy Cross Cemetery Chapel
- Bishop Noa Home for Senior Citizens
- Order of St. Francis (OSF) Hospital
- Knights of Columbus
- Roman Catholic Diocese of Marquette
- St. Peter Cathedral, altar and sanctuary (Marquette, Michigan)
- St. Norbert College (De Pere, Wisconsin)
- Marquette University (Milwaukee, Wisconsin)
- Gillen Estate Chapel, University of Notre Dame (Notre Dame, Indiana)

==== Education ====
In addition to establishing a scholarship fund initially valued at $50,000, she left a combined $820,000 to various projects at Escanaba Area Public Schools upon her death. The majority of her gift ($500,000) was specifically designated for the construction of Escanaba Senior High School. She also requested that a set amount of funds be used for the improvement of services offered to children with disabilities.

Catherine inspired the creation of Bay de Noc Community College by designating $100,000 of her fortune to the creation of a junior college in Escanaba. As such schools were not yet widespread the community took several years to be convinced, but the community college eventually opened in 1957. Briefly located in the old Escanaba High School building before construction was completed on the official campus, the school has since expanded to a second campus in Iron Mountain and continues to be an important part of the Upper Peninsula.

Mrs. Bonifas gave generously to numerous secular educational institutions in Delta County. The list of recipients includes:

- Bay de Noc Community College
- Escanaba Area Public Schools
- Escanaba Senior High School Building
- Garden Elementary School (closed)

==== Government ====
Catherine left $300,000 to the city of Escanaba to build a new county building, state office building, and recreation building. The majority of the funds were used to finance the construction of the state office building which now houses several state and federal agencies whose rental payments are replenishing the original Bonifas fund. On May 18, 1961, construction was completed on the new Delta County Building in Escanaba. It took nearly two years and cost $680,000, of which the estate of Catherine Bonifas donated $50,000.

The Catherine Bonifas Civic Center was unveiled in 1957 and provides 26,000 square feet (2,400 m^{2}) of recreational space to Escanaba residents, free of charge for all youth. The building hosts meeting rooms, a gymnasium, an archery range, and the Escanaba Senior Citizen's Center. In the winter months, the Catherine Bonifas Civic Center and the Bonifas Fine Arts Center work with the city of Escanaba to ensure community members have free access to equipment like snowshoes and skis for enjoyment of the county's trail systems.

=== Namesakes ===
Several buildings in Delta County bear her or her husband' name. As she was responsible for donating the money that lead to the construction of buildings in her husband's name after his death, those are also included in the following list of previous and current Bonifas namesakes near Escanaba.

- William Bonifas Auditorium, est. 1938, closed 1960s
  - Bonifas Fine Arts Center, est. 1974
- Catherine Bonifas Technical School
- Catherine Bonifas Civic Center, est. 1957
- Catherine Bonifas Building, Bay de Noc Community College, est. 1970
- Bonifas, Michigan, est. 1910
- Bonifas Creek (Watersmeet, Michigan)

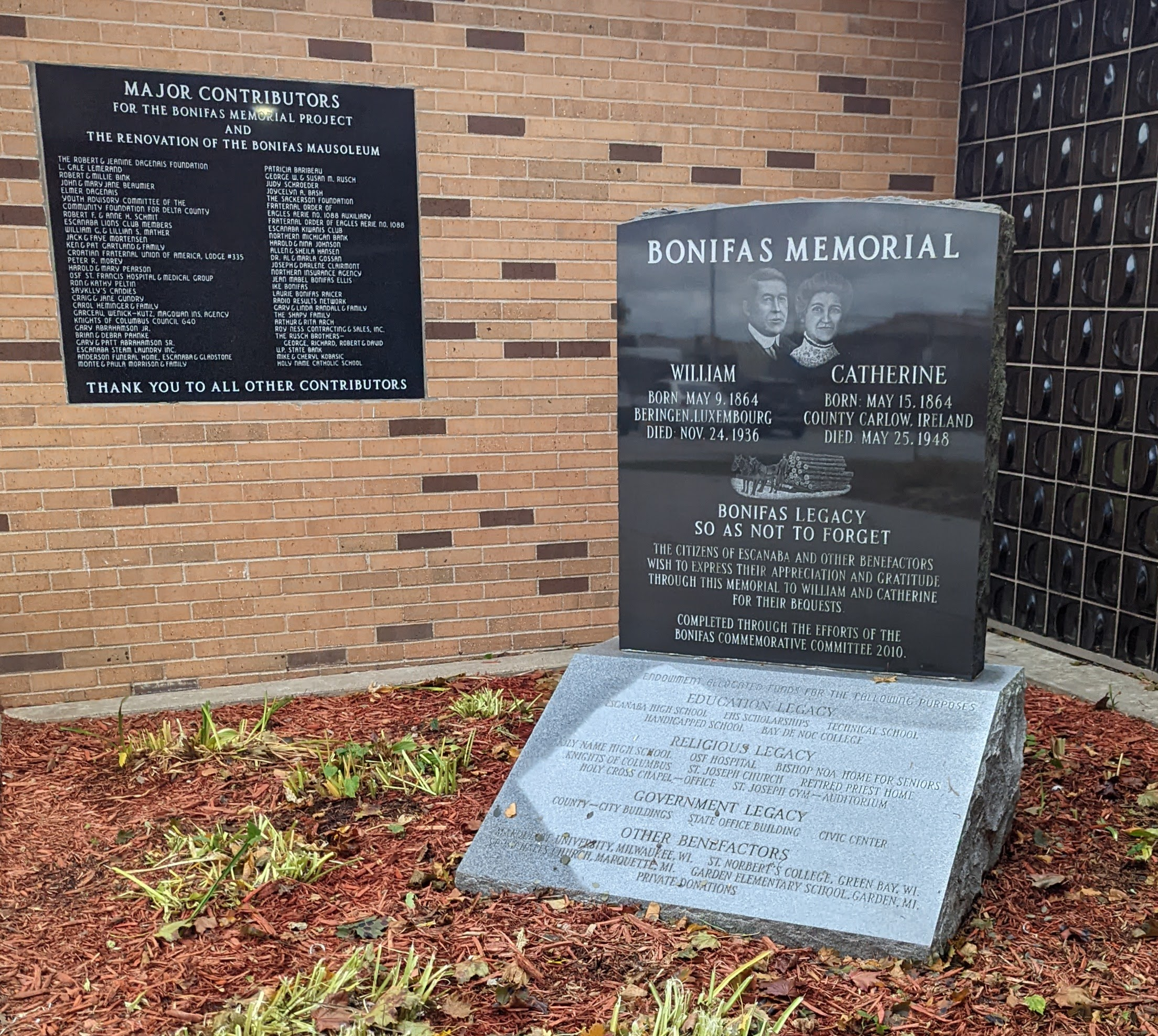
Bonifas Memorial, Catherine Bonifas Civic Center, Escanaba

=== Monuments ===
A historical marker recognizing the significance of "Bill Bonifas" can be found on a trail near the Michigan Department of Natural Resources Escanaba Forest Management Unit in Wells, Michigan. In addition to mentioning the stark differences between modern forest management and logging in the late 19th century, the plaque commemorates the Mrs. Bonifas' philanthropy with the inscription, "After his death, his widow Catherine gave over a million dollars to the City of Escanaba for civic buildings and recreation."

In 2010, a large stone monument chronicling Catherine and William Bonifas' legacies was erected in front of the Catherine Bonifas Civic Center in Escanaba. The two-piece monument was organized by the "Bonifas Commemorative Committee of 2010" and provides a comprehensive look at the couple's impact on Delta County. A large, dark stone features portraits of Catherine and William followed by an illustration of a horse and logging cart above the title "Bonifas Legacy, So as Not to Forget." The commemoration reads "The citizens of Escanaba and other benefactors wish to express their appreciation and gratitude through this memorial to William and Catherine for their bequests."
