= Esky (disambiguation) =

Esky is a trademarked brand of portable cooler from Australia

Esky or Eskies may also refer to:

- a nickname for the Edmonton Eskimos of the Canadian Football League
- a nickname for the city of Escanaba, Michigan
  - also a nickname of the city's high school, Escanaba Senior High School
- a nickname or mascot of Esquire
- "The Esky", a nickname of Nick Malceski (born 1984), former Australian rules footballer
- Esky, a character in the 1980s animated TV series Snorks
