= Burt Gustafson =

American athlete and sports coach (1925–2022)

Biographical details
- Born: November 30, 1925; Marquette, Michigan, U.S.
- Died: October 22, 2022 (aged 96)
- Education: Northern Michigan University; University of Michigan

Playing career

Football
- 1946–1949: Northern Michigan

Basketball
- 1946–1950: Northern Michigan

Track and field
- 1946–1950: Northern Michigan
- Positions: End (football); Guard, center (basketball)

Coaching career (HC unless noted)

Football
- 1950–1951: Cedarville HS (?)
- 1952–1953: Escanaba HS (asst.)
- 1954–1955: Battle Creek HS (E)
- 1956–1961: Northern Michigan (E)
- 1962: Wyoming (E)
- 1963–1970: Wyoming (DB)
- 1971–1974: Green Bay Packers (LB)
- 1977–1978 (Note: Resigned from position in preseason of 1978.): Green Bay Packers (ST)

Basketball
- 1950–1952: Cedarville HS (?)
- 1952–1954: Escanaba HS
- 1954–1956: Battle Creek HS
- 1956–1957: Northern Michigan

Track and field
- 1950–1952: Cedarville HS (?)
- 1952–1954: Escanaba HS (?)
- 1954–1956: Battle Creek HS (asst.)
- 1956–1962: Northern Michigan

Baseball
- 1950–1951: Cedarville HS (?)

Swimming
- c. 1950s: Northern Michigan

Administrative career (AD unless noted)
- 1975–1976: Green Bay Packers (WCS)
- 1978 (Note: Regular season.): Green Bay Packers (Scout)
- 1979–1984: Green Bay Packers (DPP)
- 1985–1989 (Note: Retired in preseason of 1989.): Green Bay Packers (AA/FO)

Burton F. Gustafson (November 30, 1925 – October 22, 2022) was an American athlete and sports coach. After attending Northern Michigan University (NMU) where he was a three-sport star, he coached several high school football, basketball, and track and field teams. He then returned to NMU where he served from 1956 to 1961 as a coach in four sports. He later was an assistant coach for the Wyoming Cowboys and coach and administrator for the Green Bay Packers.

== Early life and education ==
Gustafson was born on November 30, 1925, in Marquette, Michigan, and grew up in Newberry, Michigan. He attended Newberry High School, where he was a three-sport star, earning varsity letters in football, basketball, and track and field. After graduating from Newberry, he joined the United States Navy and served in World War II as a member of the Seabee department. He served three years, including two in the South Pacific. After being discharged in 1946, Gustafson enrolled at Northern Michigan University (NMU).

Gustafson played football, basketball, and track and field at NMU and finished his college career having earned a total of 12 letters, making him the first person in school history to accomplish that feat. As a senior, he was named football most valuable player and was captain of the track team. He played the end position in football, was a guard and center in basketball, and was a high jumper, hurdler, relay team member, and participant in the 440-yard dash in track and field.

== Coaching career ==
Immediately after graduating from Northern Michigan in 1950, Gustafson began a coaching career, serving as a baseball, football, track, and basketball coach at Cedarville High School. After two seasons there, Gustafson was hired as assistant football coach, track coach, and head basketball coach at Escanaba High School. In 1954, he was hired as ends coach in football, assistant coach in track and head basketball coach at Battle Creek High School. During this period, Gustafson also attended the University of Michigan, where he earned a master's degree in physical education.

In 1956, Gustafson was named assistant football coach and head track and field coach at Northern Michigan University, in addition to being given the position of assistant professor in physical education. He was also supposed to be junior varsity basketball coach but became varsity head coach shortly before the season started, after C. V. Money announced he was not up for the job. He compiled a 9–7 record in one season as basketball coach before resigning to focus on track and field and football, being succeeded by Stan Albeck. Gustafson turned the track team into one of the most prominent in the area, winning the National Association of Intercollegiate Athletics (NAIA) District Championship three times in a row. Among track athletes he coached were Curt Harper, described as "one of the nation's outstanding performers in the shot put and discus," and Al Washington, who at one point held the world record for the 60-yard dash. Gustafson also created the Northern Michigan swimming team and served as the first coach.

In 1962, Gustafson was hired as ends coach at the University of Wyoming, being described by the Casper Tribune-Herald as the football team's "grand old man" despite being only 36, as all of the other assistants were between the ages of 29 and 34. His position was quickly changed to defensive backfield coach. He served eight seasons in that position, and became one of the top defensive coaches in the nation, having his defense rank as high as fifth-best in the country.

While at Wyoming, Gustafson was invited to three of Vince Lombardi's Green Bay Packers training camps. He was given a position as Packers' linebackers coach in 1971, being hired by Dan Devine, who released a statement that said: "I followed Burt's career with a great deal of interest and I'm pleased that he's joining the Packer staff. With Dave Hanner, Don Doll and Burt Gustafson, I am confident we will have the defense in good hands." In his first season as a Packer coach, the team compiled a record of 4–8–2 and missed the playoffs. They went 10–4 the following season and made it to the first round of the playoffs, but missed it in the next two seasons.

Gustafson became a scout for West Coast colleges in 1975, but was brought back as a coach in 1977, being named coach of the special teams. In the preseason of 1978, he was shifted to a front office role after just one year as special teams coach. In 1979, Gustafson was named Director of Player Personnel, a position he served in until 1985, when he was named a special assistant, also referred to as administrative assistant/football operations. In this position he was responsible for "organizing the Packers' spring mini-camps, the annual summer training camp at St. Norbert College, handling all transportation, housing and workout arrangements for free agents brought to Green Bay and assisting position coaches in all free agent tryouts," according to the Green Bay Press-Gazette. Gustafson retired in the preseason of 1989.

== Later life and death ==
Gustafson was inducted into the Northern Michigan University Sports Hall of Fame in 1976, the Upper Peninsula Sports Hall of Fame in 1979, and was an inaugural inductee to the Newberry High School Sports Hall of Fame in 2013.

With his wife, Alice, Gustafson had two sons and three daughters. After retiring, Gustafson was a stamp collector, being involved in the efforts to get Vince Lombardi featured on a postage stamp, and lived with his wife at their home by Chicagon Lake in Iron County, Michigan. In the 2010s, he was interviewed several times by Green Bay Packers historian Cliff Christl. Gustafson discussed his opinions on past Packers coaches he worked for, including Vince Lombardi, Bart Starr, Forrest Gregg, Dan Devine and Lindy Infante. He died on October 22, 2022, at age 96.
