= Mona B. Bickerstaffe =

- Born: October 10, 1829; County Cork
- Died: July 13, 1916; Winterbourne
- Occupation: Writer
- Children: Francis Bickerstaffe-Drew
- Father: Pierce William Drew
- Awards: Pro Ecclesia et Pontifice

Elizabeth Mona Brougham Drew Bickerstaffe Brent (October 10, 1829 – July 13, 1916) was an Irish writer of books for children.

She was born Elizabeth Mona Drew on October 10, 1829 in County Cork, Ireland, one of seventeen children of the Rev. Pierce William Drew, the rector of Youghal, and Elizabeth Oliver Drew. In 1851, she married the Rev. Harry Lloyd Bickerstaffe and they would have four children, including the future writer and Roman Catholic priest Francis Bickerstaffe Drew. Rev. Bickerstaffe was a violent drunk and the couple separated in 1859. During the separation, he married another woman and was tried for bigamy. They obtained a divorce in 1861.

In the 1860s, she wrote a number of books for children, including books on nature and a book about Japan. In 1870, she married Charles Brent. In 1878, her son converted to Catholicism and she did as well the following year. In 1909, she was awarded the Pro Ecclesia et Pontifice.

Mona B. Bickerstaffe died on 13 July 1916 in Winterbourne, Wiltshire.

== Bibliography ==
- Araki the Daimio: A Japanese Story of the Olden Time. 1 vol. London: Jackson, Walford and Hodder, 1865.
- Castle Connor. London, 1867.
- The White Roe of Glenmere and Other Tales. 1 vol. London: J. Hunter, 1867.
- Down Among Water Weeds: or, Marvels of Pond Life. 1 vol. Edinburgh: Johnstone, Hunter, and Co., 1868.
- The Sunbeam's Story: or, Sketches from Beetle Life. 1 vol. Edinburgh: Johnstone, Hunter, and Co., 1868.
- (with "S. B. P.") The Enchanted Wheat: A Tale. London: 1869.
- Tales from the Holly-Tree Farm. 1 vol. Edinburgh: Johnstone, Hunter, and Co., 1870.
- Archie Young. Scribner, W & A.
