= Fourth vow =

Religious vow of the Catholic Church

A fourth vow is part of religious vows that are taken by members of some religious institutes in the Catholic Church, apart from the traditional vows based on the evangelical counsels: poverty, chastity and obedience or their equivalents stability, conversion of manners, and obedience.

An additional vow usually is an expression of the order or the congregation's charism or particular insertion in the apostolic field of the Church.

== Religious orders ==
=== Camillians ===
The Camillians take a fourth vow of service to the sick, even in danger of death.

=== Poor Clares ===
The Vow of Enclosure is made by some branches of the Poor Clares. The sisters known as "extern sisters" (or "externs") do not make this additional vow in order to be able to handle some of the community's needs outside the papal enclosure.

== Society of Jesus ==
After a period of service as a priest, members of the Society of Jesus—referred to as Jesuits—can be allowed to take a fourth vow of obedience to the pope with regard to the missions.

The text of the vow is "...I further promise a special obedience to the sovereign pontiff in regard to the missions, according to the same Apostolic Letters and the Constitutions." The same text is being used today, just as it was in the days of Saint Ignatius of Loyola.

The vow is an expression of the strong attachment the Jesuits have for the Church, and their willingness to accept whatever service the Church asks (through the pope) if it is of a great apostolic need. In part VII of the Constitutions, discussing the "distribution of the members in the Vineyard of the Lord" the founding fathers explain the purpose of the fourth vow: "Those who first united to form the Society were from different provinces and realms and did not know into which regions they were to go, whether among the faithful or the unbelievers; and therefore to avoid erring in the path of the Lord, they made that promise or vow in order that His Holiness might distribute them for greater glory to God."

This vow is limited to the priests of the Society. Only those who have been accepted by the Society to take this vow may serve as major superiors in the Society of Jesus.

== Religious congregations ==
Other religious institutes have adopted the practice of taking a fourth vow:

- The Religious Sisters of Mercy take a fourth vow of service to the poor, sick, and ignorant.
- The Franciscan Friars of the Immaculate take a fourth vow of devotion to Mary.
- The Legionaries of Christ take a vow never to seek positions of authority within the Legion.
- The Missionaries of Charity take the fourth vow to serve the poorest of the poor.
- The Order of the Blessed Virgin Mary of Mercy requires that its members take a fourth vow to die for another who is in danger of losing their faith.
- The members of the Passionists take a fourth vow to promote the suffering and death of Jesus.
- The Sisters of Life take a fourth vow to "protect and enhance the sacredness of human life."

== Former fourth vows ==
A fourth vow of the Missionaries of Christ Jesus, to march and serve the missions, was suppressed in 1969. A fifth vow of the Legionaries of Christ was suppressed in 2009.

== Bibliography ==
- The Constitutions of the Society of Jesus (ed. by George Ganss), Saint Louis (USA), 1970.
- Johannes Günter Gerhartz: Insuper Promitto; Die feierlichen Sondergelübde Orde, Rome, 1966.
- Albert Chapelle: Le quatrième vœu dans la Compagnie, Rome, 1978.
- John W. O'Malley: The fourth vow in its Ignatian context: a historical study, in Studies in the Spir. of the Jesuits, vol.15, 1983.
- Pettinati, G. (1978). Pelliccia, Guerrino; Rocca, Giancarlo (eds.). Dizionario degli Istituti di Perfezione (in Italian). Vol. V. Milano, Italy: Edizioni Paoline.
