= Missionaries of Christ Jesus =

Spanish Catholic association (1944-)

The Missionaries of Christ Jesus are a Catholic religious institute founded in Javier, Spain in 1944 by María Camino Sanz Orrio. Members use the post-nominal letters MCJ.

== History ==
María Camino Sanz Orrio was President of Catholic Action during the Spanish Civil War. In the spring of 1938 she was awarded the "Pro Ecclesia et Pontifice" medal.

Orrio (Note: "María Camino was born in Pamplona on May 3, 1896 in the family formed by Fermín Sanz and Eustasia Orrio. They had 9 children, Maria Camino was the second one but before her birth the firstborn died so she was practically the oldest of 8 siblings. The family ... was economically well-off and occupied a prominent place in that Pamplona society of the early twentieth century. María Camino studied at the San José de Cluny school until she was 19 years old and in addition to "general culture" she learned to speak English and French perfectly, which would be of great help later on. She was intelligent, determined, with clear judgment and a straightforward criterion; she had a strong personality and a strong character. ... María Camino died in Pamplona on June 6, 1991." -Leoz 2015) sought total renunciation and sacrifice for herself, and imagined that the new congregation would be a difficult way of life in mission to serve to the poorest, the abandoned, and the sick.

The sisters follow the Ignatian spirituality. The congregation sought to be a more agile and effective style of missionaries. They sought to be women of faith and prayer, anchored in the essentials: the love of Jesus Christ and the consecration to the Mission. In order to preserve this consecration, members of the congregation took a fourth vow to "march and serve the missions". However, this vow was suppressed in 1969. Everything they do as an order is expected to be in service to this ideal.

The institute was founded in Javier, Spain on 14 March 1944 as a pious union with the name of Missionaries of Christ Jesus. It was canonically erected as a congregation of diocesan right by Marcelino Olaechea Loizaga, bishop of Pamplona, in a decree on 5 June 1946.

On 3 October 1946, the first four Missionaries of Christ Jesus pronounced their vows. The first sisters were the founder Maria Camino Sanz Orrio, Maria Concepción Arraiza Jáuregui and Maria Teresa Unzu Lapeira. Eugenia Nagore Nuin joined them just a few months later. They had initially planned to go to Japan, but instead the first group departed to India on 18 November 1948. This group consisted of Maria Camino Sanz Orrio, Guadalupe Velasco, Pilar Gonzalez, Maria del Villar and Margarita Cifre. The five sisters went to two mission posts, Kohima and Tura. By then, there were already 50 missionaries. The sisters established St. Xavier's School in Tura in 1950; Orrio was the first principal. Sisters Guadalupe and Margarita worked at the hospital in Kohima.

In November 1951, two other sisters began a mission in Japan. In 1954 the first two Japanese members of the congregation began their formation.

On 27 June 1954 the Congregation for the Propagation of the Faith elevated the Missionaries of Christ Jesus to the status of an Institute of Pontifical Law. In 1956, missions began in the Congo and Venezuela. In 1969 they began in Bolivia and soon after in Chile. Years later they go to the Philippines, the Dominican Republic, Cameroon, Chad and China. Currently there are 312 missionaries from Spain, Japan, India, Belgium, Slovenia, Congo, Bolivia, Chile, Venezuela, Guatemala, the Philippines and Vietnam.

The congregation received the Papal Decree of Praise on 27 June 1954 and final approval on 9 April 1962.

As of 2013, they are present in Spain, Asia (China, Philippines, Japan, India), in the Americas (Bolivia, Chile, Dominican Republic, Venezuela) and in Africa (Congo, Cameroon, Chad); the general office is in Madrid.

The congregation runs the San Pedro Parish School in Los Chaguaramos, Venezuela and continues to maintain a presence in Javier, Spain.

In 2008, the congregation numbered 304 members in 54 houses. In 2013, they had 302 members.

The liturgical feast day of the congregation is on 3 December.
