= Cum Sanctissimus =

Instruction issued by Catholic dicastery in 1948

Cum Sanctissimus was an instruction issued on March 19, 1948, by the Sacred Congregation for Religious and Secular Institutes of the Catholic Church. The instruction clarified specific issues with respect to the approving religious institutes.

Along with Provida Mater Ecclesia and Primo Feliciter (both issued by Pope Pius XII) this instruction provided the basis for Catholic secular institutes to receive their own legislation.
