= Kathleen Mary Burrow =

Australian health educator, businesswoman, and Catholic leader (1899-1987)

Kathleen Mary Burrow MBE
- Born: Kathleen Mary Graham; 18 April 1899; Mudgee, New South Wales, Australia
- Died: 20 May 1987 (aged 88); Croydon, New South Wales, Australia
- Other names: Kate Burrow
- Occupations: Physiotherapist, teacher, Catholic lay leader
- Years active: 1930s - 1950s
- Known for: President, Legion of Catholic Women, Archdiocese of Sydney
- Awards: Pro Ecclesia et Pontifice Medal; MBE; UN Peace awards

Kathleen Mary Burrow MBE (1899 - 1987) was an Australian physiotherapist, educator, businesswoman, and Catholic lay leader. She and her sister Anne founded the Graham-Burrow School of Physical Education in 1926. They organized courses in dance, physical education and deportment for Catholic schools. As a lay leader, Burrow served as president of the Legion of Catholic Women in the Roman Catholic Archdiocese of Sydney for ten years, and was president of the Catholic Women's League of Australia from 1957 to 1959. She served as president for the Pan-Pacific and South East Asia Women’s Association of Australia from 1969 to 1972. A supporter of the United Nations, she was a leader in the NSW state chapter of the United Nations Association of Australia for thirty years.

Burrow was appointed a Member of the Order of the British Empire in 1956, and was awarded the Pro Ecclesia et Pontifice medal in 1977. She also received two peace awards from the United Nations, one in 1976 and one in 1989. Burrow died in 1987.

== Biography ==
=== Early life and education ===
Burrow was born on 18 April 1899 in Mudgee, New South Wales, Australia. Her parents were Elijah and Catherine Graham. Her father was a mining engineer, and the family lived in a gold mining area near Clarkes Creek. She had a sister, Anne, with whom she would later start a business.

Burrow attended St. Mathews Convent of Mercy School, run by the Sisters of Mercy, for her secondary education. She then enrolled in the University of Sydney, and completed a Bachelor of Arts degree in 1922. She became a founding member of the University Catholic Women’s Association, and was elected treasurer in 1926, as a graduate. She was also involved in the Newman Association of Catholic Graduates, serving on the executive team. She later returned to the University of Sydney to complete a Diploma in Social Studies in 1944.

=== Career ===
==== Teaching and physiotherapy ====
Burrow began her career as a physical culture teacher in North Sydney's Girls' High School. She also worked as a volunteer at Catholic orphanages, providing physical educational programming. Burrow and her sister Anne then established their own school, the Graham-Burrow School of Physical Education, in 1926. The school served the Catholic community, and provided classes in physical education, dance and deportment in Catholic schools. Burrow continued to develop her professional credentials, earning a certificate in massage in 1936. She was a registered physio-therapist for close to forty years. Among other events, Burrow oversaw the performance of a "Living Rosary" display, which was part of the Archdiocese of Sydney's Catholic celebrations for the Commonwealth Jubilee held in April 1951; the "Living Rosary" pageant featured five thousand children performing "Five Mediations" In addition to planning this event, Burrow also served as a lay representative on the Archdiocese's Jubilee planning committee.

==== Leadership in civic and women's organizations ====
In addition to her professional life as a business owner and teacher, Burrows was an active leader in Catholic women's organizations. In 1949, she was appointed president of the Sydney branch of the Legion of Catholic Women, by Norman Gilroy, then serving as Sydney's Cardinal Archbishop. Prior to becoming president, she had been treasurer of the regional branch of the Legion, and a member of the Ashfield local branch. She served as president for ten years, from 1949 to 1959. During this time, Burrow led efforts to increase Catholic women's participation in civic organizations and governmental boards. In 1949, she participated in and spoke at a protest in Sydney against the imprisonment of Cardinal József Mindszenty, in Hungary.

Burrow also took on leadership roles within Catholic women's organizations at the national level. She represented the Federation of Catholic Women of Australia at the Jubilee Women's Convention, held in Melbourne in October 1951, and served as national president of the Catholic Women's League of Australia from 1957 to 1959. Burrow also served as the Australian representative to the World Union of Catholic Women’s Organisations, from 1957 to 1965. She attended the second Congress of the Lay Apostolate held in Rome in 1957, as well as the 14th world congress of Catholic women's organizations, held in Rome that same year.

Beyond her work within Catholic women's organizations, Burrow was a leader in several other civic and women's organizations. A strong supporter of the United Nations, she was involved in the New South Wales chapter of the United Nations Association of Australia for thirty years. In 1959, she was serving on the standing committee for the Status of Women, as well as the committee for World Health, for the NSW chapter.

From 1954 to 1960, Burrow was international secretary for the Australian National Council of Women. In 1957, she travelled to Washington D.C., to attend the National Conference on Negro Women, as a guest. This was the annual convention of the National Council of Negro Women, and at the same 1957 conference, Dr. Martin Luther King, Jr. was one of the keynote speakers.

In 1958, Burrow represented Australia at the Tokyo Pan-Pacific and South East Asia Women’s Conference. She later served as president of the Pan-Pacific and South East Asia Women’s Association of Australia, from 1969 to 1972. From 1976 to 1982, she was again in a leadership role with the Australian National Council of Women, now known as the National Council of Women of Australia, serving as their convenor for mass media.

=== Personal life and death ===
On 17 January 1925, she married Kenney Burrow, who was a librarian. They were married at St Mary’s Catholic Church in Mudgee, New South Wales. The couple had three children together, a daughter and two sons. Her husband died in 1954. One of her sons pre-deceased her as well.

Burrow died on 20 May 1987, and is buried in the Rookwood cemetery.

== Honours ==
Burrow was appointed a member of the Order of the British Empire on 2 January 1956, as part of the New Year Honours. The award was granted "In recognition of service to social welfare." She received the Pro Ecclesia et Pontifice Papal Cross in 1977. Burrows also received two United Nations peace medals, the first one in 1976 and a second in 1986.

== Legacy ==
In 1931, Burrow donated funds to the Catholic Women's Society at Sydney University for an annual prize on a paper on the theme of "The Sacraments as a means of Grace." The prize was named in her honour as the Kathleen Burrows Prize.

A Kathleen Burrow Research Institute has been established in the Catholic Schools New South Wales (NSW). The institute website states that it "conducts and publishes research on contemporary issues in school education". In 2021, Anthony Fisher, Archbishop of Sydney, gave the inaugural Kathleen Burrow Research Institute Lecture.
