= Mária Spoločníková =

Slovak art renovator and painter

- Born: 25 October 1926; Košice, Czechoslovakia
- Died: 9 September 2021 (aged 94); Košice, Slovakia
- Occupation(s): Art renovator, art historian, painter
- Years active: 1953-2021

Mária Spoločníková (25 October 1926 – 9 September 2021) was a Slovak art restorer, painter and art historian.

== Biography ==
Spoločníková was born on 25 October 1926 in Košice, where she lived her entire life. She was among the first class graduating from the Academy of Fine Arts and Design in Bratislava in 1953. Following her graduation, she worked at the East Slovak Gallery as well as the Slovak National Gallery.

In 2003 the Pope Pope John Paul II awarded Spoločníková the Pro Ecclesia et Pontifice award.

She died on 9 September 2021 in Košice.

== Art ==
She focused on renovating medieval art, in particular the works of Master Paul of Levoča and gothic statues of Mary and Elizabeth of Hungary. She also renovated the Altar at the Basilica of St Giles in Bardejov. The East Slovak Gallery repeatedly organized exhibitions of Spoločníková's work.
