= Francis Bickerstaffe-Drew =

British writer and priest

The Right Reverend Monsignor Francis Bickerstaffe-Drew CBE K.H.S.
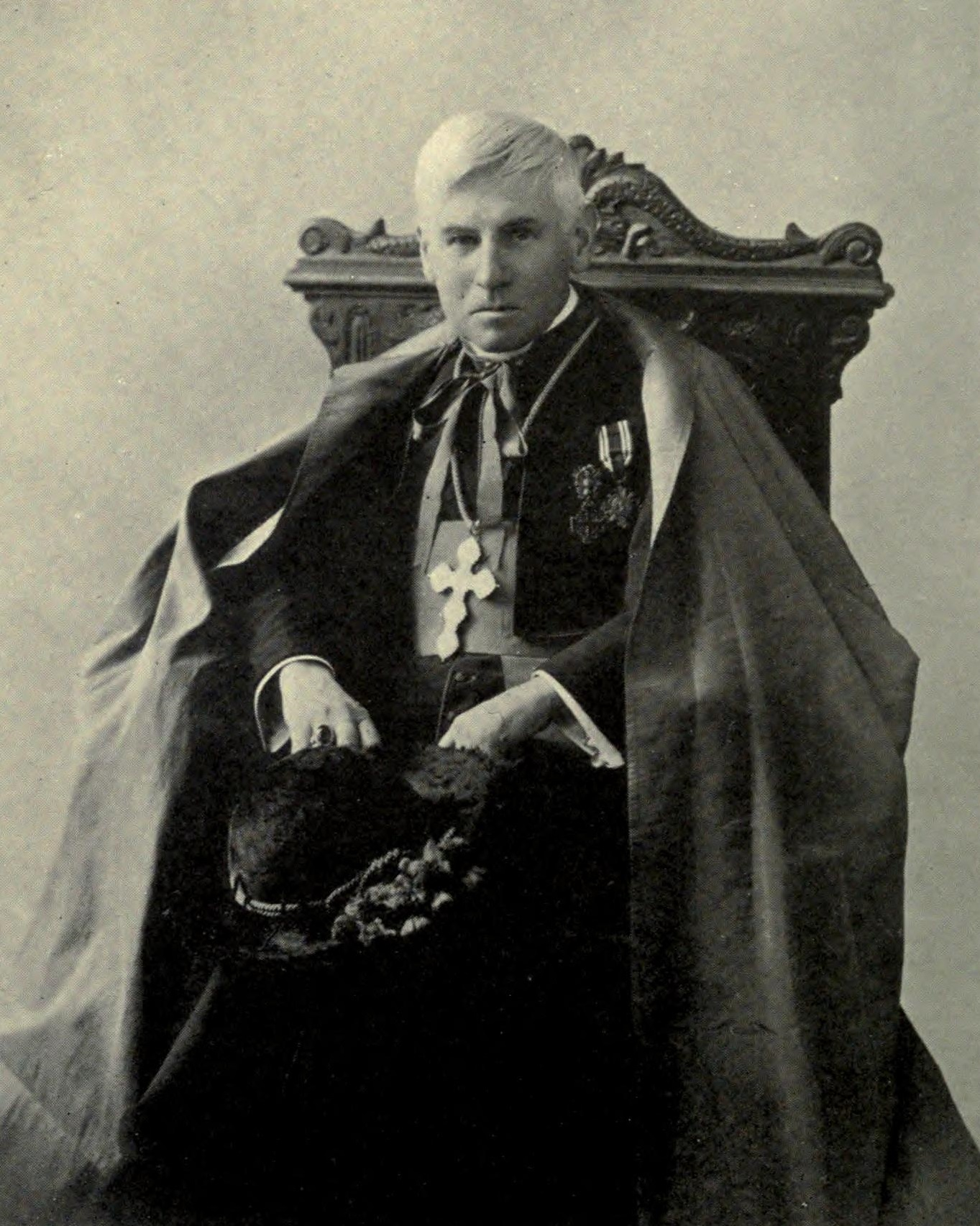
- Born: 11 February 1858; Headingley, Leeds, England, UK
- Died: 3 July 1928 (aged 70); Salisbury, Wiltshire, England, UK
- Occupations: Cleric, author
- Religion: Roman Catholic
- Ordained: 1884
- Title: Rt Rev Msgr

Francis Bickerstaffe-Drew CBE, KHS, better known as John Ayscough and born Francis Browning Bickerstaffe, (11 February 1858 – 3 July 1928) was a British writer and Roman Catholic priest.

== Biography ==
Born in Headingley, Leeds, the younger son of Harry Lloyd Bickerstaffe, an Anglican cleric, and Elisabeth Mona Brougham Drew, the daughter of Pierce Drew of Heathfield Towers, Muckridge, Youghal, County Cork, Ireland. He had one sibling, an elder brother, Pierce.

In 1878, he converted to Roman Catholicism, while an undergraduate at Pembroke College, Oxford. Bickerstaffe-Drew was ordained as a Catholic priest in 1884 and served as a chaplain in the British Army for more than thirty years. He was appointed a chaplain to the forces (4th class), ranking as captain, on 27 January 1892, and while stationed in Malta was promoted to chaplain to the forces (3rd class), ranking as major, on 1 February 1903. As army chaplain he served with the British Expeditionary Force in France during the First World War and was mentioned in despatches. He was made a private Papal Chamberlain by Pope Leo XIII in 1891 and by Pius X in 1903, was a member of the Pontifical Chamber of Malta.

Bickerstaffe-Drew died in Salisbury, England on 3 July 1928, aged 70.

== Distinctions ==
- Honorary degree from the University of Notre Dame
- Honorary degree from the Marquette University
- Knight of the Order of the Holy Sepulchre
- Pro Ecclesia et Pontifice (1901)

== Works ==
- Oremus: or, Little Mildred (1880).
- Dominus Vobiscum: or, The Sailor Boy (1880).
- Veni Creator; or, Ulrich's Money (1881).
- Pater Noster; or, An Orphan Boy (1881).
- Per Jesum Christum: or, Two Good Fridays (1881).
- Ave Maria; or, Catesby's Story (1882).
- Credo; or, Justin's Martyrdom (1882).
- Ora Pro Nobis (1883).
- Marotz (1908).
- Mr. Beke of the Blacks (1908).
- Dromina (1909).
- A Roman Tragedy and Others (1909).
- San Celestino (1909).
- Outsiders—and In (1910).
- Mezzogiorno (1911).
- Hurdcott (1911).
- Faustula N. A.D. 340 (1912).
- Gracechurch (1913).
- Levia-pondera: An essay book (1913)
- Monksbridge (1914).
- Prodigals and Sons (1914).
- French Windows (1918).
- Jacqueline (1918).
- The Tideway (1918).
- Fernando (1919).
- Abbotscourt (1920).
- First Impressions in America (1921).
- Discourses and Essays (1922).
- Mariquita (1922).
- Pages from the Past (1922).
- Dobachi (1923).

=== Selected articles ===
- "Isolation and Federation," The American Ecclesiastical Review (1913).
- "A Dog and a Bad Name: Some Notes on the Novel and its Present Function," The American Catholic Quarterly Review (1913).
- "Picture Teaching," The American Catholic Quarterly Review (1914).
- "A Novelist's Novel-Reading," The Catholic World (1915).

=== Short stories ===
- "A Beginning—At Railham," Part II, Part III, The Catholic World (1913–1914).
- "The Sacristans," The Catholic World (1915).
