= Chris Alvares =

Surinamese classical musician (1901–1994)

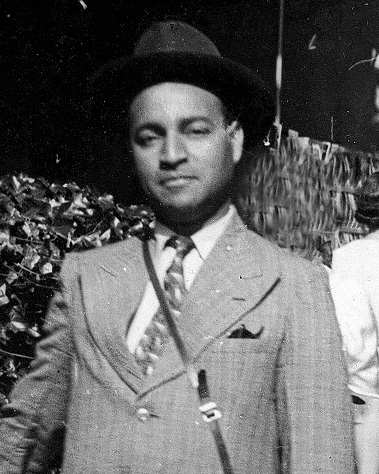
- A 1939 portrait of Chris Alvares in Switzerland
- Born: Christiaan Hermanus Cornelis Alvares; 1901; Paramaribo, Surinam
- Died: 1994 (aged 92–93); Haarlem, Netherlands
- Occupations: Musician, composer, conductor, and educator

Christiaan Hermanus Cornelis Alvares (1901–1994), more commonly known as Chris Alvares, was a Surinamese musician, composer, conductor, and educator known for his contributions to classical music in both Suriname and the Netherlands. His diverse talents encompassed playing the organ, piano, flute, and cello, as well as conducting, composition, and teaching.

== Early life and education ==
Born in Paramaribo, Suriname, to a family of Creole and Sephardic Jewish descent, Alvares grew up in a deeply religious environment. Under the mentorship of Brother Anselmus (Carel Bonten), Alvares received formal music education, which began with training in organ and piano. His skills expanded to include the flute and cello. Alvares' musical abilities caught the attention of Brother Anselmus, leading him to become the organist of the St. Alphonsus Church at a young age in 1916.

== Career ==
Throughout his tenure in Suriname, Alvares held positions as an organist and conductor. Notably, in 1929, he assumed the role of organist at the St. Rosa Church, a position he held for decades, interrupted only by his service as a deputy organist at the Saint Peter and Paul Cathedral in Paramaribo. His contributions extended beyond organ playing, as he also led the men's choir and became known for his skills in harmonium playing.

In 1963, Alvares relocated to Haarlem, the Netherlands. He served as the conductor of the Women's Choir and acted as a substitute organist at the Goede Herderkerk in Schalkwijk, Haarlem, until his death in 1994.

Alvares also made contributions as an educator. He taught at the St. Clemens School and later at the St. Paulus School.

In 1954, on the occasion of his 25th anniversary as organist at the St. Rosa Church, he was awarded the Pro Ecclesia et Pontifice medal by Pope Pius XII. Later, in 1991, on his 90th birthday and 75th anniversary as an organist, Queen Beatrix honored him by conferring the title of Officer of the Order of Orange-Nassau. He was the only Surinamese musician to have been awarded both honors in his lifetime.

== Musical contributions and compositions ==
Although Alvares did not consider himself a composer in the traditional sense, his compositions reflected his multifaceted musical abilities. Under the guidance of Brother Anselmus, Alvares composed church and patronage songs, often experimenting with well-known texts. Notably, he contributed waltzes, marches, and other pieces for the orchestra Amicitia, founded by Brother Anselmus. In addition to Amicitia, some of his compositions were performed by the Military Band. Works composed by Alvares include:

- Josef waltz (violins 1, 2, 3, cello, piano)
- Hugo March (violins 1, 2, 3, piano)
- Valse d'Armand (violins etc. and piano)
- Amicitia March (piano)
- Valse de Max (violins and flute)
- Olympia March (piano)
- Marche de François (piano)
- Marche de Guillaume (piano)
- Valse de Charles (piano)
- Valse de Henri (violins etc. and piano)
- Valse de César (violins etc. and piano)

== Family ==
In 1934, Alvares married Louisa Eleonora Niemel. They had seven children, including six daughters and a son.
