= Giuseppe Frascaroli =

Italian painter (born 1953)

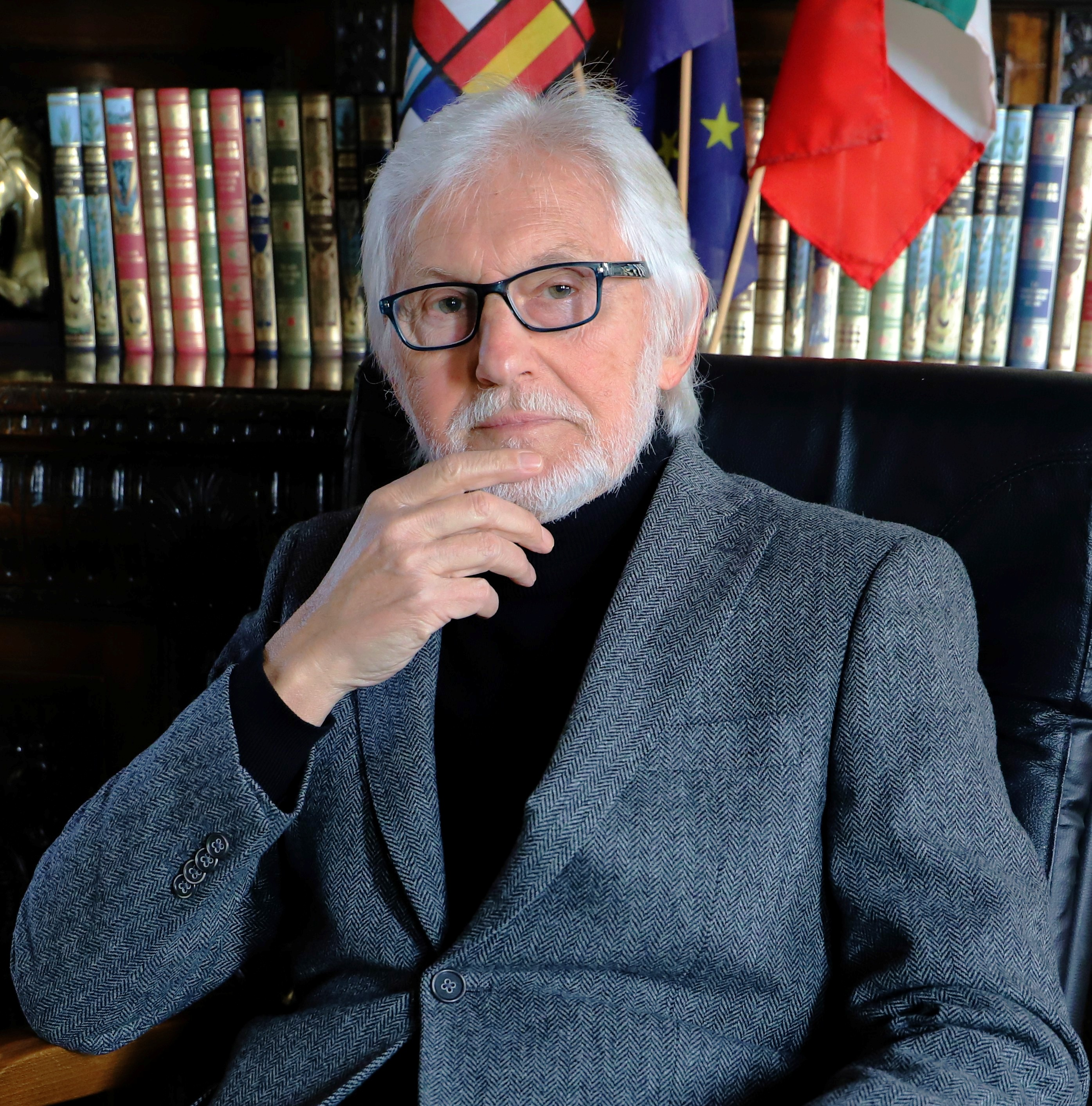
- Born: 6 May 1953 (age 73); Oltrepò Pavese, Italy
- Occupations: Neurologist; Painter
- Movement: Neoclassicism
- Website: https://www.giuseppefrascaroliart.com

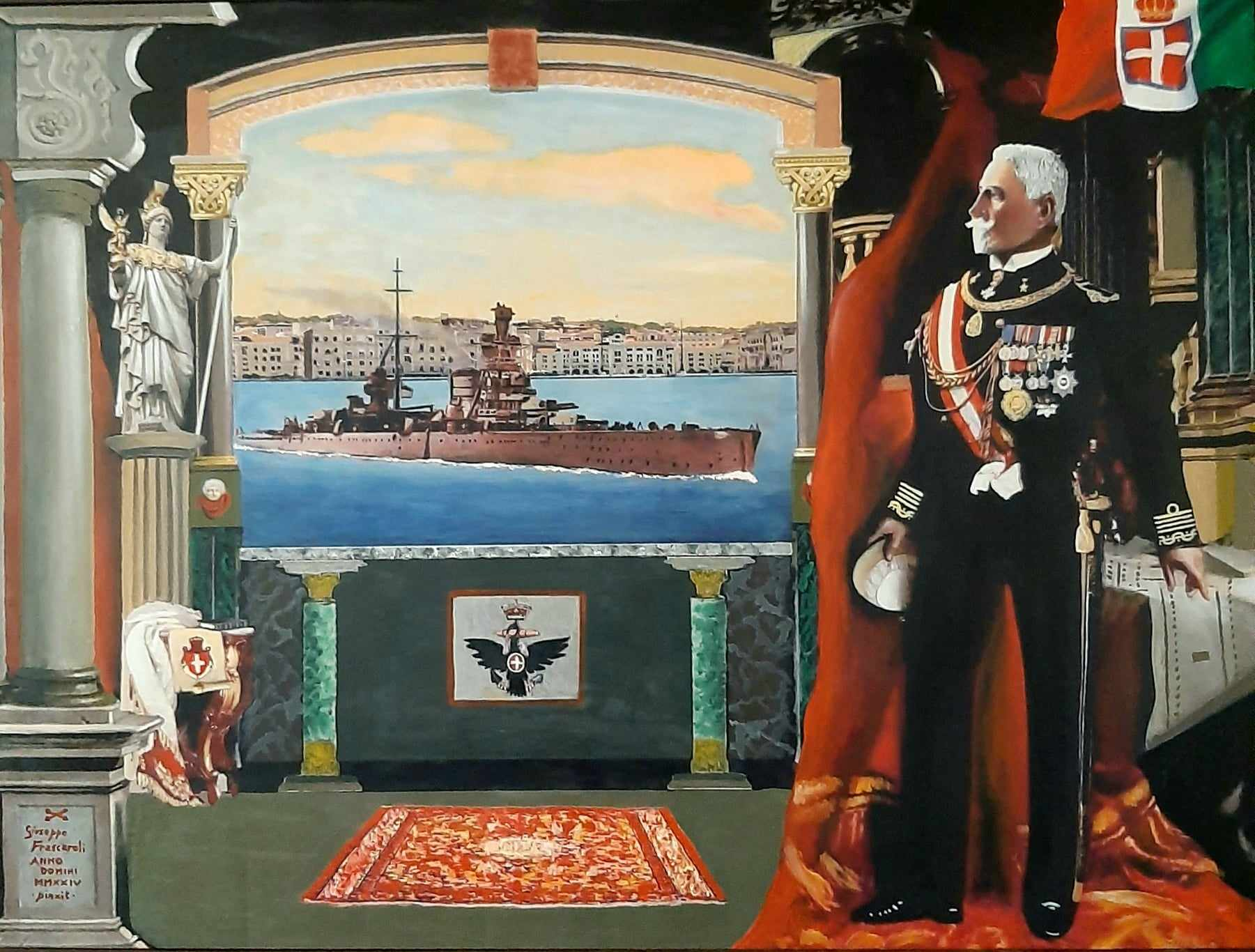
Tribute to Italian landing helicopter dock Trieste

Giuseppe Frascaroli (born 6 May 1953) is an Italian neoclassical painter.

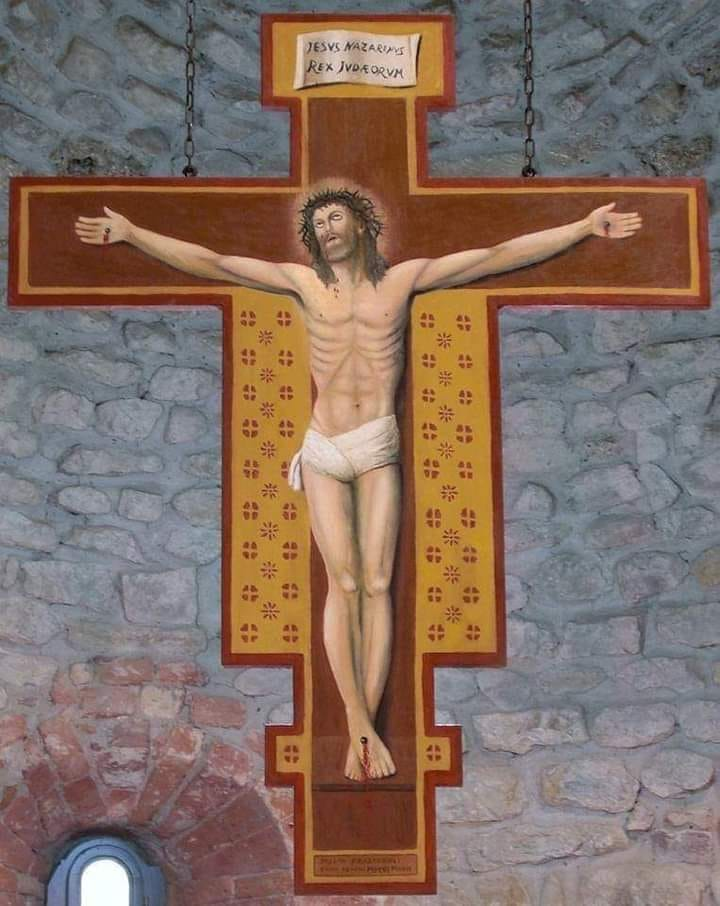
Work located in the Hermitage of Sant'Alberto di Butrio (PV)

== Life ==
Giuseppe Frascaroli was born on 6 May 1953 in Oltrepò Pavese, Italy. He later received a medical degree with a specialization in neurology. A neurologist by trade, he is also a neoclassical painter working in Italy. He is a recipient of the Gold Italian Medal of Merit for Culture and Art, and was named a Knight of the Order of Merit of the Italian Republic, later promoted to the level of Officer. In 2016 Frascaroli was named a "Painter With Merit" of Italian Navy by the Italian Ministry of Defense. In 2024 Frascaroli received the honor Pro Ecclesia et Pontifice from the Holy See. Since 2013 he has also been a Knight of the Order of Saints Maurice and Lazarus.

== Career ==
The Government of Italy has gifted Frascaroli paintings to foreign dignitaries including those from China and Monaco. At the 2013 Venice Biennale, his works were presented to the Government of Taiwan. Museums and collections that contain his works include the Museums and the Apostolic Palace of the Vatican, the Arsenal of Venice, the National Historical Museum of the Infantry in Rome, the Maronite Christian Church of "San Giorgio" in Beirut in Lebanon, the Naval History Museum in Venice, the Government Palace of the Republic of China in Taipei, the University of Genoa Delle Peschiere, the Stupa of Boudhanath in Kathmandu in Nepal, the Teatro alla Scala in Milan, the Cathedral of San Josè in Antigua Guatemala, the San Cristóbal de las Casas in Mexico, the Archbishopric Palaces of Krakow and Genoa, and the General Staff of the Italian Navy. He is especially known for his portraits of Catholic Popes: Frascaroli has personally delivered his pictorial works to Pope John Paul II, Pope Benedict XVI and Pope Francis. There is also a permanent exhibition dedicated to his works in the Palazzo Belgioioso of Milan, which has dedicated a room to his career.

On 24 May 2022 a painting by Frascaroli was preserved in the Basilica of Santa Maria delle Grazie in Milan, a UNESCO World Heritage Site. On 2024, a painting by Frascaroli was placed in the Officers' Hall of the new Italian landing helicopter dock Trieste, the largest military ship ever built by Italy. Another painting is housed in Rome at Palazzo Farnese, the seat of the French Embassy in Italy.
