= Sahyadri Hospitals =

Hospital chain in Maharashtra, India

- Trade name: Sahyadri Hospitals Private Limited
- Industry: Healthcare
- Founded: 1994
- Headquarters: Pune, India
- Products: Hospitals, pharmacy, diagnostic centres
- Website: sahyadrihospital.com

Sahyadri Hospitals is a chain of hospitals in Maharashtra, India.

== History ==
Sahyadri Hospitals is the largest chain of hospitals in Maharashtra. Mr Abrarali Dalal is the managing director and chief executive officer (CEO) of Sahyadri Hospitals Pvt. Ltd. The first hospital was established at Deccan Gymkhana Pune, in 2004. As of 2019, the chain has eleven network hospitals with over 1300 beds. They had their first dedicated facility for neurology and neurosurgery treatment at their flagship hospital in the Deccan Gymkhana in November 2004.

== Hospitals ==
The Sahyadri group has nine hospitals with more than 1000 beds and 200 ICU beds.

- Pune
  - Sahyadri Super Speciality Hospital, Deccan Gymkhana
  - Sahyadri Hospital Bibwewadi
  - Sahyadri Super Speciality Hospital Hadapsar
  - MomStory by Sahyadri Hospitals, Hadapsar
  - Sahyadri Hospital Kothrud
  - Sahyadri Super Speciality Hospital, Nagar Road
  - Sahyadri Speciality Labs, Lokmanya Colony, Kothrud.
- Karad
  - Sahyadri Super Specialty Hospital Karad
- Nashik
  - Sahyadri Super Speciality Hospital, Nashik

== Current facilities ==
=== Sahyadri Hospital – Deccan Gymkhana ===
Sahyadri Super Speciality Hospital, Deccan Gymkhana is a private hospital in Pune, Maharashtra. It is a 202-bed hospital. It offers services which include cardiology, orthopaedic, organ transplant, general surgery, oncology, internal medicine, paediatrics, and radiology. Pune's first Covid-era heart transplant was on a 49-year-old woman, performed by Dr Manoj Durairaj and team.

=== Sahyadri Hospital – Nagar Road ===
Sahyadri Super Speciality Hospital, Nagar Road is a multi-specialty tertiary care NABH accredited hospital. It has 130 beds. It is a multi-specialty and supra-specialty hospital including a cath lab, IVF lab, ICU and CCU as well as NICU. It is supported by a lab, diagnostic and imaging services like CT scan, MRI, digital X-ray, stress test, colour Doppler and sonography.

=== Sahyadri Hospital – Hadapsar ===
Sahyadri Super Speciality Hospital, Hadapsar is a multi-specialty tertiary care hospital. The 150-bed hospital serves its surrounding areas such as Magarpatta City, Amnora Township, and densely populated areas of Hadapsar, Kharadi and Wagholi.

The hospital provides 24-hour emergency and critical care supported by a pathology lab, radiology and around the clock pharmacy.

Sahyadri Hospital, Hadapsar provides chemotherapy, surgical oncology, radiation oncology, surgical care – neurosurgery, general surgery, orthopaedics, urology, ophthalmology, ENT; and medical services such as gastroenterology, internal medicine, obstetrics and gynaecology, paediatrics and neurology.

=== Sahyadri Hospital – Kothrud ===
Sahyadri Super Speciality Hospital, Kothrud, is a 31-bed hospital, integrated with quaternary health care at Sahyadri Super Speciality Hospital – Deccan Gymkhana.

=== Sahyadri Hospital – Bibwewadi ===
Sahyadri Super Speciality Hospital, Bibwewadi is a 35-bed unit which houses 8 ICU beds and forms one of the vital spokes in the Sahyadri Group of Hospitals. It has all basic facilities for a secondary care multispecialty hospital. The hospital caters to other specialties like internal medicine, orthopaedics, gynaecology and obstetrics, paediatrics, general surgery, urology vascular surgery, cardiology and gastroenterology.

=== Sahyadri Hospital – Kasba Peth ===
Surya Sahyadri Hospital, Kasba Peth is a multifaculty 65-bed hospital along with trauma care and with a burn centre.

=== Sahyadri Hospital - Nashik ===
Sahyadri is a multispeciality tertiary care hospital which opened in April 2014 for residents of Nashik and nearing towns like Sangamner, Sinnar, Satana, Malegaon, Amalner, Ghoti, Yeola, Deola and Vani. This large 132-bed hospital provides all medical specialities and super-specialities.

=== Sahyadri Hospital - Karad ===
Spread over about 100,000 sq ft area, this is a full-fledged tertiary care multi-specialty hospital in Southern Maharashtra. It has a four-storey, twin building, located on the Pune – Bangalore Highway at Karad about 175 km from Pune.

The hospital caters to the healthcare needs of people in Satara, Sangli and Kolhapur districts. It houses 150 beds, providing access to the best of specialty and superspecialty medical services.

Sahyadri Hospital - Karad is the only centre of excellence in the Satara District for in vitro fertilization (IVF) and joint replacement. The Radiology Department has Siemens Multi Slice Somatom, Sensation 16 for non-invasive coronary and carotid angiographies.
