= Escanaba Area Public Schools =

School district in Michigan

Address
- 1500 Ludington Street Escanaba, Delta County, Michigan, 49829; United States

District information
- Type: Public school district
- Grades: Kindergarten-12
- Established: 1867; 159 years ago
- Superintendent: Dr. Coby Fletcher
- School board: 7 members
- Accreditation: Michigan Department of Education
- Schools: 5
- Budget: $33,408,000 2022-2023 expenditures
- NCES District ID: 2613500

Students and staff
- Students: 2,130 (2024-2025)
- Teachers: 120.22 (on an FTE basis) (2024-2025)
- Staff: 268.46 FTE (2024-2025)
- Student–teacher ratio: 17.72 (2024-2025)
- Athletic conference: MHSAA Class B
- District mascot: Eskymos
- Colors: Orange and black

Other information
- Website: eskymos.com

Escanaba Area Public Schools (EAPS) is the only public school district in Escanaba, Michigan. The district operates three elementary schools, one virtual learning center, and one combined junior high/senior high school. EAPS serves approximately 2,200 total students and employs 115 teachers, for a student-teacher ratio of 19:1.

== History ==
The first public schoolhouse in Escanaba was unveiled in 1867, at the site of what became the city's first public library in 1903. The Carnegie Public Library of Escanaba was relocated to a new building in 1995 and the original library was sold to private owners soon after. A small monument to the original schoolhouse was erected in 1934 and still stands on the property.

During the Great Depression, the school district sponsored a two-year "Freshman College" in response to graduating high school student's difficulty in finding and financing higher education. The Escanaba Community College operated for a few years before closing, until local benefactor Catherine Bonifas designated $100,000 of her estate to the construction of a new post-secondary education facility in the city in 1948. The school district spent a decade hiring lecturers and consultants from the University of Michigan, Michigan State University, and the Michigan State Department of Public Instruction to explain the role and importance of a community college to Escanaba residents. EAPS voted to pass the responsibility of the college to Delta County in the early 1960s, as the consolidation of local K-12 districts and new construction were at the top of their priority list, with many believing the community college should be operated by all of the school districts in the county. Bay de Noc Community College's first classes were held in the old Escanaba High School building in the fall of 1963, with the first classes at their current Lincoln Road location offered in the fall of 1969.

In 2022, the former Washington Elementary School was demolished and replaced with a green space for recess, a bus lane, and a parking lot. The school building had been empty since 1998, with the demolition providing more space for the children that currently attend Escanaba Upper Elementary.

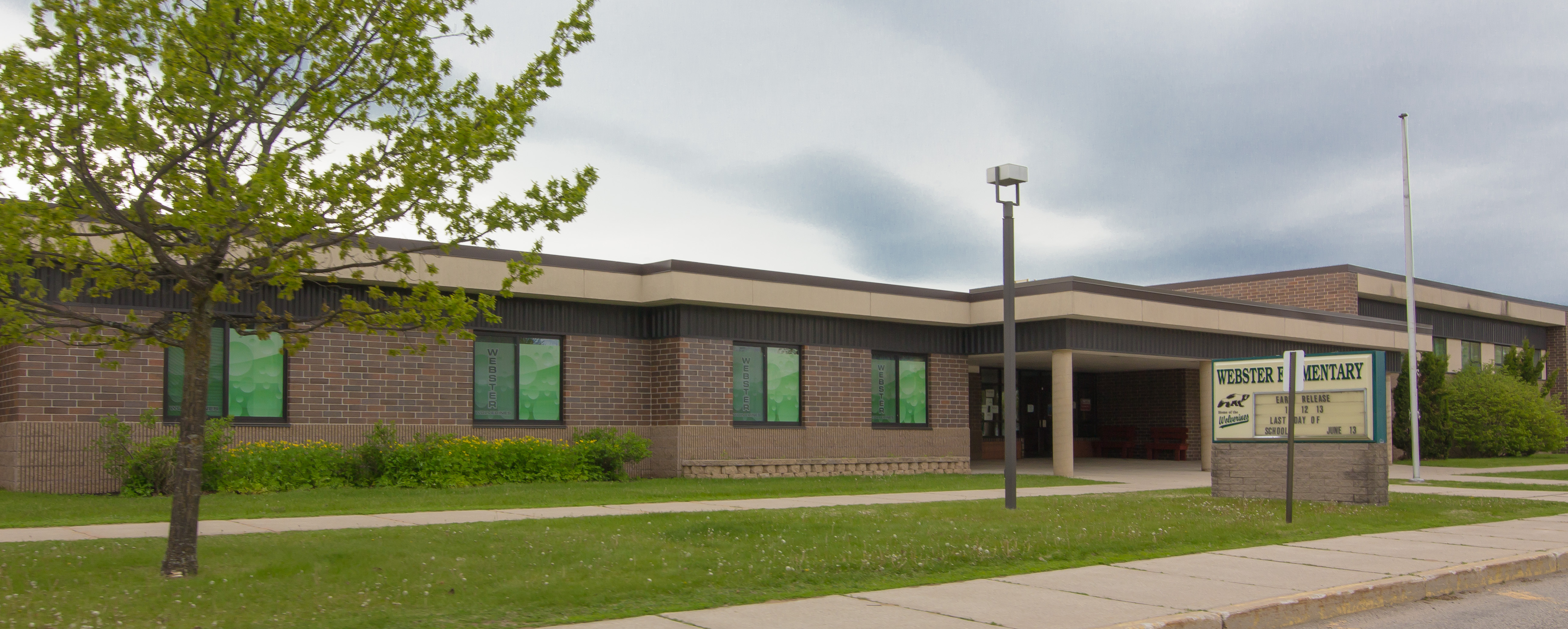
Webster Kindergarten Center, Escanaba

=== Building names ===
Lemmer Elementary School is named for former Escanaba Area Public Schools superintendent and strong advocate for the formation of a local community college, John Lemmer. The new Lemmer building began offering classes to students in 1954, with a new addition built in 1967. Webster Kindergarten Center is the latest in a long line of Escanaba school buildings named for Delta County-native Webster Marble, famous early inventor of outdoor recreation equipment and gun sites, and founder of nearby business Marble Arms. The first Webster Elementary building was in operation from 1911 until 1991, when it was demolished and a new Webster Elementary School was built in its place. In 2018, the city of Escanaba voted to convert the school to exclusively house classrooms for pre-kindergarten and kindergarten students, and the building was renamed the Webster Kindergarten Center.

== Schools ==
Currently operating schools
Name	Grade(s)	Students (2021)	Opened
Webster Kindergarten Center	PK-K	200	2018
Lemmer Elementary School	1-2	300	1954
Escanaba Upper Elementary	3-5	450	
Escanaba Junior/Senior High	6-12	1,200	
Escanaba Student Success Center	8-12	50	

Closed schools
Name	Grade(s)	Students	Opened	Closed
Cornell Elementary				1993
Flat Rock Elementary	K-5			2004
Ford River Elementary	K-6	170		2004
Franklin Elementary	K-5	180	1967	2018
Jefferson Elementary	K-6	180	1967	2002
Pine Ridge Elementary				2005 (sold)
Soo Hill Elementary	K-3	150	pre-1967	2020
Washington Elementary			1967	1998
Webster Elementary (old)			1911	1991
Wells Elementary	K-6	150	1954	2003

== Demographics ==
Of the 2,200 K-12 students enrolled in the Escanaba Area Public School district as of 2021, 89% were white, 5% were Native American, 3% were two or more races, 2% were Hispanic/Latino, and less than 1% of students were African American, Asian, or Native Hawaiian. 1,200 students (58%) come from households that are considered economically disadvantaged. The median income of households in the area was $42,480 as of 2019.

== Curriculums ==
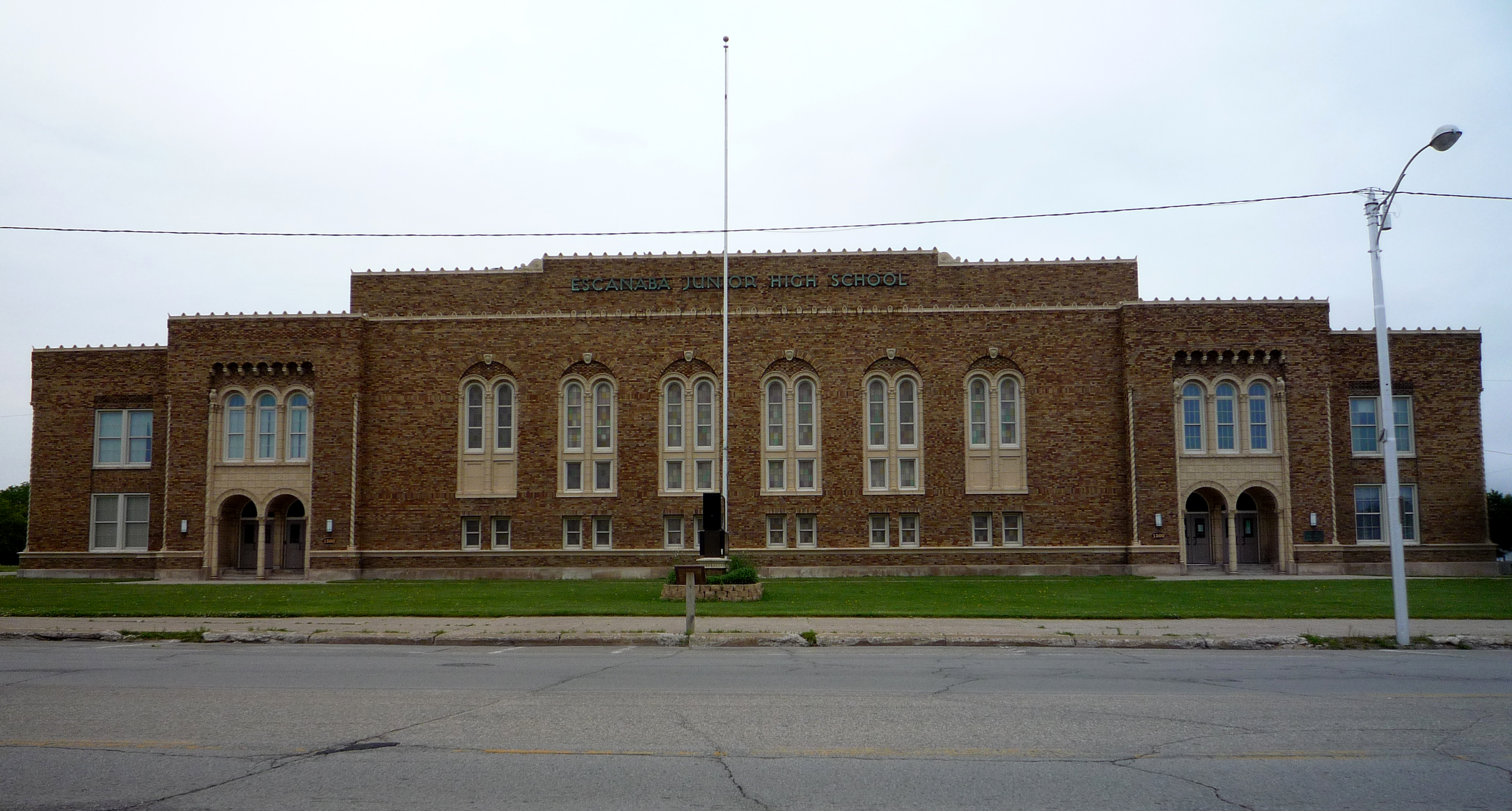
Escanaba Upper Elementary School, 2009

The Upper Elementary School provides students in 3rd-5th grades with courses in mathematics, science, social studies, health and physical education, art, music, language arts, economics, and technology. Escanaba Jr./Sr. High follows the Michigan Merit Curriculum and offers dozens of electives to supplement a student's education. Escanaba High School offers Advanced Placement courses in English, computer science, biology, chemistry, calculus, and statistics. Additionally, the school coordinates with Northern Michigan University and Bay de Noc Community College to provide high school students with access to college courses for credit via a dual enrollment model. Electives available to junior/senior high students include chorale and chorus, marching band, orchestra, band, art, and physical education courses.

Escanaba Middle College is a 5-year hybrid high school/college program jointly sponsored by Bay de Noc Community College and Escanaba High School. The program allows students to receive both a high school diploma and either an associate's degree, industrial certification, or 60 transferable-credits at the end of their 5 years in the program.

The Escanaba Student Success Center offers a supervised virtual learning environment to 8th-12th grade students in Delta County who, for whatever reason, are at-risk of dropping out of high school before receiving a diploma.

== Notable alumni/faculty ==
- Kevin Tapani — Major League Baseball player (1989-2001)
- Tom Casperson — Michigan State Senator (2011-2018)
- Chauncey W. Yockey — attorney and early Milwaukee leader
- Nanette Hanson — Michigan Teacher of the Year (2022–23)

== Recognition ==
The State of Michigan named an Escanaba Area Public Schools teacher Michigan's Teacher of The Year for 2022-23. Nannette Hanson is a 1st-grade teacher at Lemmer Elementary School who now represents more than 86,000 Michigan-based public school teachers at monthly state school board meetings and other state education functions. In addition, she is Michigan's 2023 entry for the prestigious 2023 National Teacher of The Year award.
