= Vow of Enclosure =

Religious promise made by some Poor Clares

The vow of enclosure is a religious vow of living a life separated from the outside world. It is made by some branches of the Poor Clares in addition to the three vows of obedience, poverty and chastity.

The sisters known as "extern sisters" (or "externs") do not make this additional vow in order to be able to handle some of the community's needs outside the papal enclosure.

The Poor Clares constitute the second branch of the Order of Friars Minor, founded in the thirteenth century by Clare of Assisi under the inspiration of Francis of Assisi.
