= Manoj Durairaj =

Indian heart transplant surgeon (born 1971)

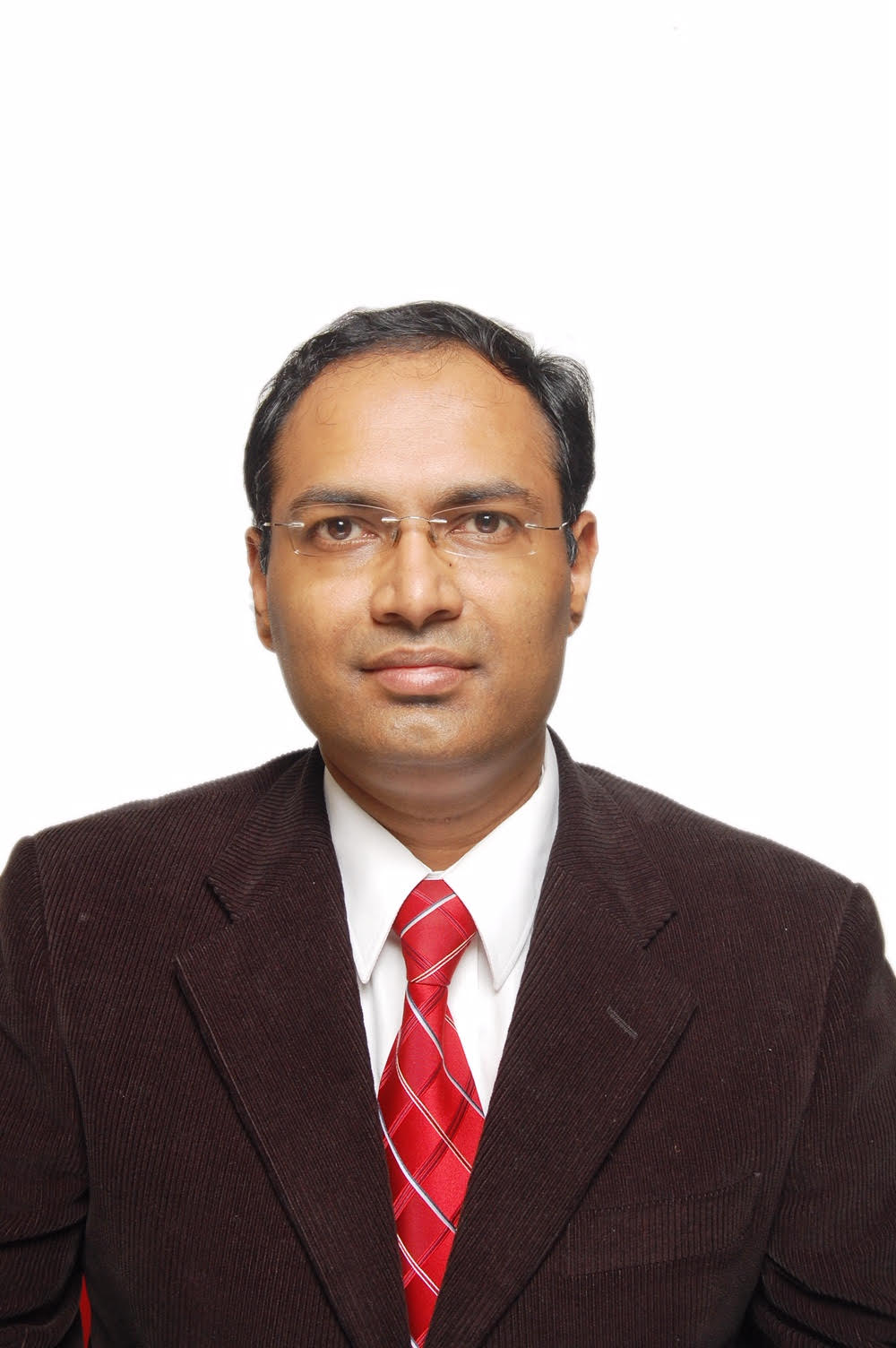
- Born: 3 February 1971 (age 55); Pune, Maharashtra, India
- Other names: Durairaj, Manoj
- Education: Rajah Muthiah Medical College All India Institute of Medical Sciences, New Delhi, India; FACC, Melbourne University, Victoria, Australia
- Occupation: Cardiac Surgeon
- Employer(s): Director, Marian Cardiac Centre and Research Foundation, Ruby Hall Clinic, Sahyadri Hospitals, Pune, India
- Known for: He is credited with performing Pune’s first successful heart transplant as well as its first successful Left Ventricular Assist Device (LVAD) implantation: milestones that opened a new era in the treatment of end‑stage heart failure in Western India; Pune's first heart transplant; Philanthropy
- Title: Dr
- Spouse: Sheena Durairaj
- Awards: Pro Ecclesia et Pontifice, Governor of Lagos Award, Outstanding Citizen of Pune, Hriduyamitra Award, Vocational Service Award

Dr Manoj Durairaj is an Indian heart transplant surgeon, based in Pune. He was awarded "Pro Ecclesia et Pontifice" in November 2021. He has been working as Director, Marian Cardiac Centre and Research Foundation, Pune, India, the firsts heart transplant centre in Pune, and Director of Heart and Lung Transplant Program Sahyadri Hospital, Pune, India.

As Programme Director for Heart and Lung Transplantation at Sahyadri Hospitals, Pune, Dr Durairaj has led a comprehensive transplant programme accessible to patients across income levels.

== Family and educational background ==
Dr Manoj Durairaj was born on 3 February 1971, at Pune, India, to Dr. Manuel Durairaj, Professor of Cardiology and former Honorary Physician, who served as the honorary physician to three India presidents — N Sanjeeva Reddy, R Venkataraman and Gyani Zail Singh. His mother, Mrs Valsamma Durairaj, was actively engaged in the charismatic movement in Poona Diocese, Maharashtra, India. Manoj Durairaj did his schooling at St. Vincent's High School, Pune, India. Then he went to pursue his M.B.B.S. at Rajah Muthiah Medical College, Annamalai University, Chidambaram, Tamil Nadu, India (1988-1994). He completed his M.S. (General Surgery) at Armed Forces Medical College, Poona University, Pune, Maharashtra, India (1995-1998). He completed M. Ch. (Cardiothoracic and Vascular Surgery), at All India Institute of Medical Sciences, New Delhi, India (1999-2002). He earned his Advanced Fellowship in Cardiac Surgery, from Austin, Melbourne University, Victoria, Australia (2002-2005). Dr Manoj has served as the 55th President of the Indian Association of Cardiovascular-Thoracic Surgeons (2024-2025), which is the highest position in Cardiothoracic surgery in India.

== Marian Cardiac Centre and charitable work ==
As Director of the Marian Cardiac Centre and Research Foundation, he oversees an NGO that has facilitated hundreds of free or subsidised open‑heart surgeries, 2D echocardiography camps, and preventive cardiac screenings for underprivileged women and children across Maharashtra.

Marian Cardiac Centre is involved in charitable work, specifically through its "Saving Little Hearts" project. This initiative focuses on raising funds to support children needing urgent open-heart surgery, aiming to provide timely and appropriate treatment to prevent deaths due to lack of funds or access to care.

== Humanitarian and international outreach ==
He was the first Indian surgeon to perform paediatric cardiac surgery in Nigeria, serving medically underserved African communities. In recognition of his global humanitarian service, he was awarded the Pro Ecclesia et Pontifice medal by the Vatican.

As the 55th President of the Indian Association of Cardiovascular‑Thoracic Surgeons (IACTS) since February 2024, he has introduced skill‑lab initiatives and public outreach programs to raise surgical standards nationwide. His foundation ensures comprehensive post‑operative and transplant support—including lifelong medication, investigations, and rehabilitation—especially for indigent patients like Prerana and Ganesh Kale.

== Career ==
Dr. Manoj Durairaj is a cardiac surgeon, practising Pediatric and Adult Cardiac Surgery. Dr. Manoj Durairaj performed Pune's first heart transplant. By creating two centers for heart transplantation in Pune, India, he pioneered the heart transplantation program in the city. He conducted the first heart transplant in Nagpur in June 2019 as the Program Director of the Department of Heart Transplantation at Sahyadri Hospital. Further, his team completed Pune's first successful left ventricular assist device (LVAD), which replaces the left part of the heart with a mechanical pump. Through the project "Saving Little Hearts" run by Marian Cardiac Centre and Research Foundation, Pune, India, he has helped more than 600 lives.

Dr Manoj Durairaj was presented with the Governor of Lagos Award for performing the city's first pediatric heart surgery. Additionally, he led a team to Sanaa, Yemen, where he performed the nation's first off-pump coronary surgery at the Tabqa government hospital. He has operated on more than 350 heart patients from the marginalised sections free of cost.

- Dr Manoj Durairaj has performed more than 30 Heart transplants. He has carried out more than 15,000 successful heart surgeries, many of which are for the poor and the destitute.
- Performed Pune’s first successful LVAD implantation in February 2020, spearheading advanced treatment options for end‑stage heart failure.
- Instrumental in launching heart transplant programmes at Ruby Hall Clinic (Pune), Sahyadri Hospitals (Pune), New Era Hospital (Nagpur), and Epic Hospital (Ahmedabad, Gujarat).

== Awards and honours ==
- Dr Durairaj was honoured by the Vatican with the highest medal, Pro Ecclesia et Pontifice for lay individuals for his professional brilliance in the field of heart transplantation and his philanthropic activities. This award was established in 1888 by Pope Leo XIII. In 2018, he was elected as a Fellow of the American College of Cardiology. He is the only cardiac surgeon in Pune to have received this distinction.
- He was presented with the Governor of Lagos Award for performing the first paediatric heart surgery in Lagos State, Nigeria in July 2011. In February 2018, the Research Society of B J Medical College presented him with the Dr BB Dixit award for his pioneering effort in the field of heart transplantation in Pune and for his work as a philanthropist.
- Dr. Manoj Durairaj was honoured as an "Outstanding Citizen of Pune" by the Mayor of Pune for his charity efforts and for initiating the heart transplant program in Pune during the Pune Municipal Corporation's Republic Day Awards 2018.
- He was designated by the Gujarat government as a Heart Transplant Inspector, responsible for issuing licenses to hospitals to do heart transplantation. He manages a humanitarian fund that has assisted hundreds of children in receiving free open-heart surgery, including heart transplantation.
- He was presented with the Hriduyamitra Award by the Deputy Charity Commissioner of Pune for his support of pediatric heart transplantation and assistance with over 350 youngsters undergoing open-heart surgery.
- He was also presented with the Rotary Club of Poona's Vocational Service Award 2021 by Deepak Londhe, the club's president.

With over 28 years of experience, he is a cardiac surgeon based in Pune. He has been credited with performing Pune’s first successful heart transplant and first Left Ventricular Assist Device (LVAD) implantation, contributing to the development of advanced treatment options for end-stage heart failure in the region.He has been involved in establishing heart transplant programs at Ruby Hall Clinic and Sahyadri Hospitals in Pune, New Era Hospital in Nagpur, and Epic Hospital in Ahmedabad. He has also served as programme director for heart and lung transplantation at Sahyadri Hospitals, where he has overseen the development of its transplant programme.

- Here are his YouTube talks.
- A Big Heart for Healing Little Hearts: An Interview with Dr Manoj Durairaj in Asian Journal of Religious Studies.
