= Provida Mater Ecclesia =

Apostolic constitution by Pope Pius XI

Provida Mater Ecclesia was an apostolic constitution by Pope Pius XII, that recognized secular institutes as a new form of official consecration in the Catholic Church.

Promulgated on February 2, 1947, the constitution recognized secular consecration; that is, it recognized that lay men and lay women could, while remaining "in the world", live consecrated lives– which hitherto had been held to be possible only as a religious. The specific charism of secular institutes unites the elements of a consecrated life lived according to the evangelical counsels and living as a lay person not in a religious community. Pius described them as "societies, clerical or lay, whose members make profession of the evangelical counsels, living in a secular condition for the purpose of Christian perfection and full apostolate."

This way of life dates back at least to the sixteenth century and Angela Merici's Company of St. Ursula. Merici envisioned the members as consecrated to God and dedicated to the service of their neighbor, but to remain in the world, teaching the girls of their own neighborhood, and to practice a religious form of life in their own homes. In this, she anticipated the secular institutes that were approved centuries later. The members wore no special habit and took no formal religious vows. Merici wrote a rule of life for the group, which specified the practice of the evangelical counsels in their own homes. The rule she had written was approved in 1544 by Pope Paul III.

While not living together under the same roof, members come together at meetings. Unlike apostolic societies dedicated to a particular work, secular institutes are organizations of like-minded Catholic laity or clerics who share a certain vision lived out personally.

Along with Primo Feliciter and Cum Sanctissimus the constitution Provida Mater Ecclesia provided the basis for Catholic secular institutes to receive their own legislation.

== See also ==
- Primo Feliciter
