= Primo Feliciter =

Motu proprio issued by Pope Pius XII on March 12, 1948

Primo Feliciter was a motu proprio issued by Pope Pius XII on March 12, 1948.

Primo Feliciter was issued a year after the constitution Provida Mater Ecclesia. This motu proprio confirmed and blessed secular institutes within the Catholic Church.

Along with Provida Mater Ecclesia and Cum Sanctissimus, Primo Feliciter provided the basis for Catholic secular institutes to receive their own legislation.
