= Faculty of Teacher Education, University of Zagreb =

Faculty of the University of Zagreb

Coordinates: 45°47′49″N 15°57′43″E

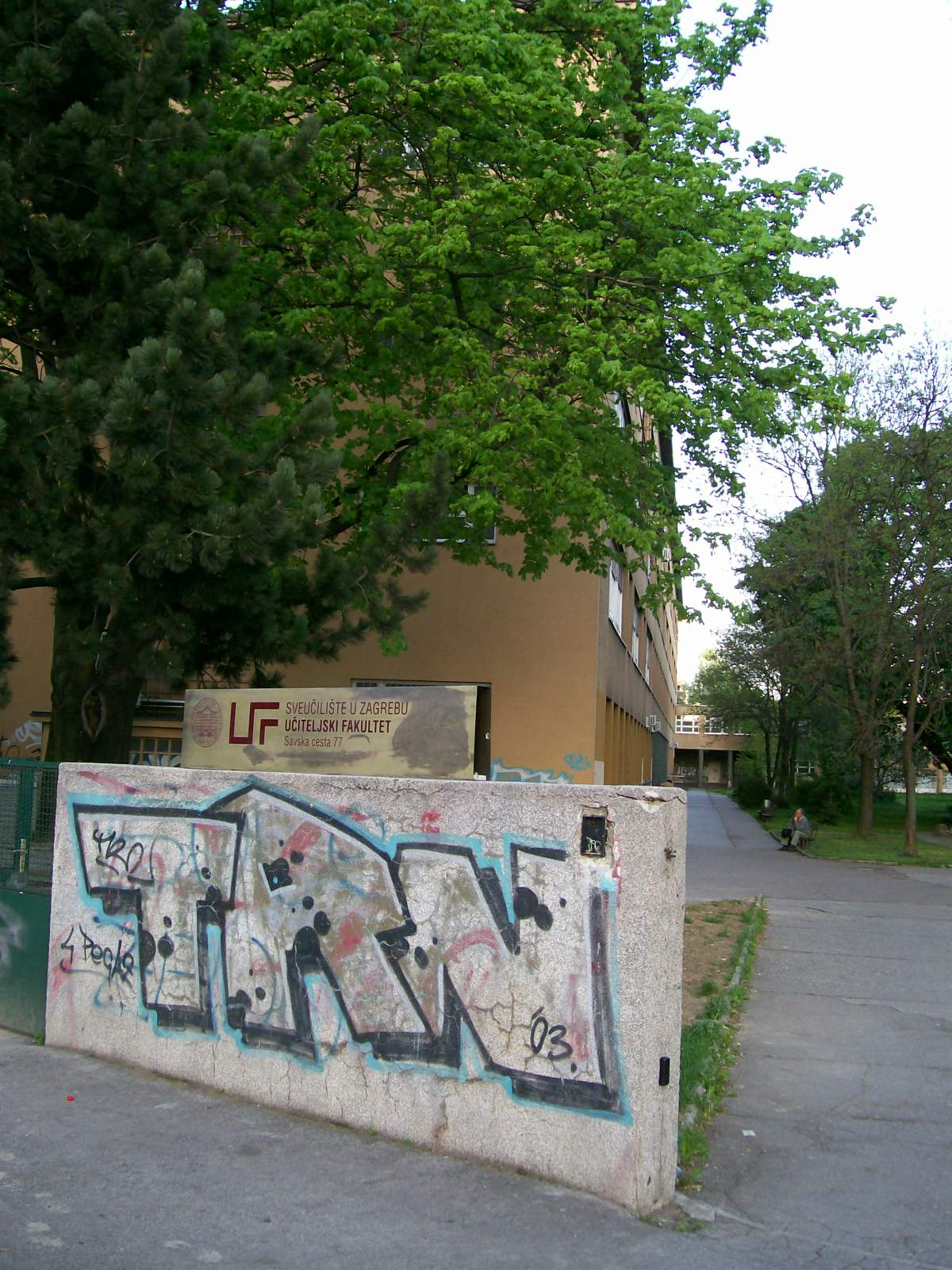
Faculty of Teacher Education's building is located in the Savska street in central-southwest Zagreb.

The Faculty of Teacher Education at the University of Zagreb is a faculty which focusses on the education of teachers and preschool teachers. Apart from its central location in Zagreb, it has facilities in Petrinja and Čakovec.

The first teacher's school in Zagreb was the Higher Pedagogical School which offered a two-year program from 1919. In the Independent State of Croatia the program was extended to four years, but was shorted to three after the Second World War. It became the Pedagogical Academy in 1960, and upon Croatian independence the academy gradually evolved into the modern faculty.

According to Croatia's Parliamentary Commission for Verification of War and Post-War Crimes the faculty's grounds in Zagreb were the site of a mass grave of approximately 300 prisoners killed by the Yugoslav Partisans in 1945, after the end of the Second World War. After a public education campaign in 2008 by concerned groups, Croatian authorities launched an investigation into the site.
