= Pro Ecclesia et Pontifice =

Roman Catholic award

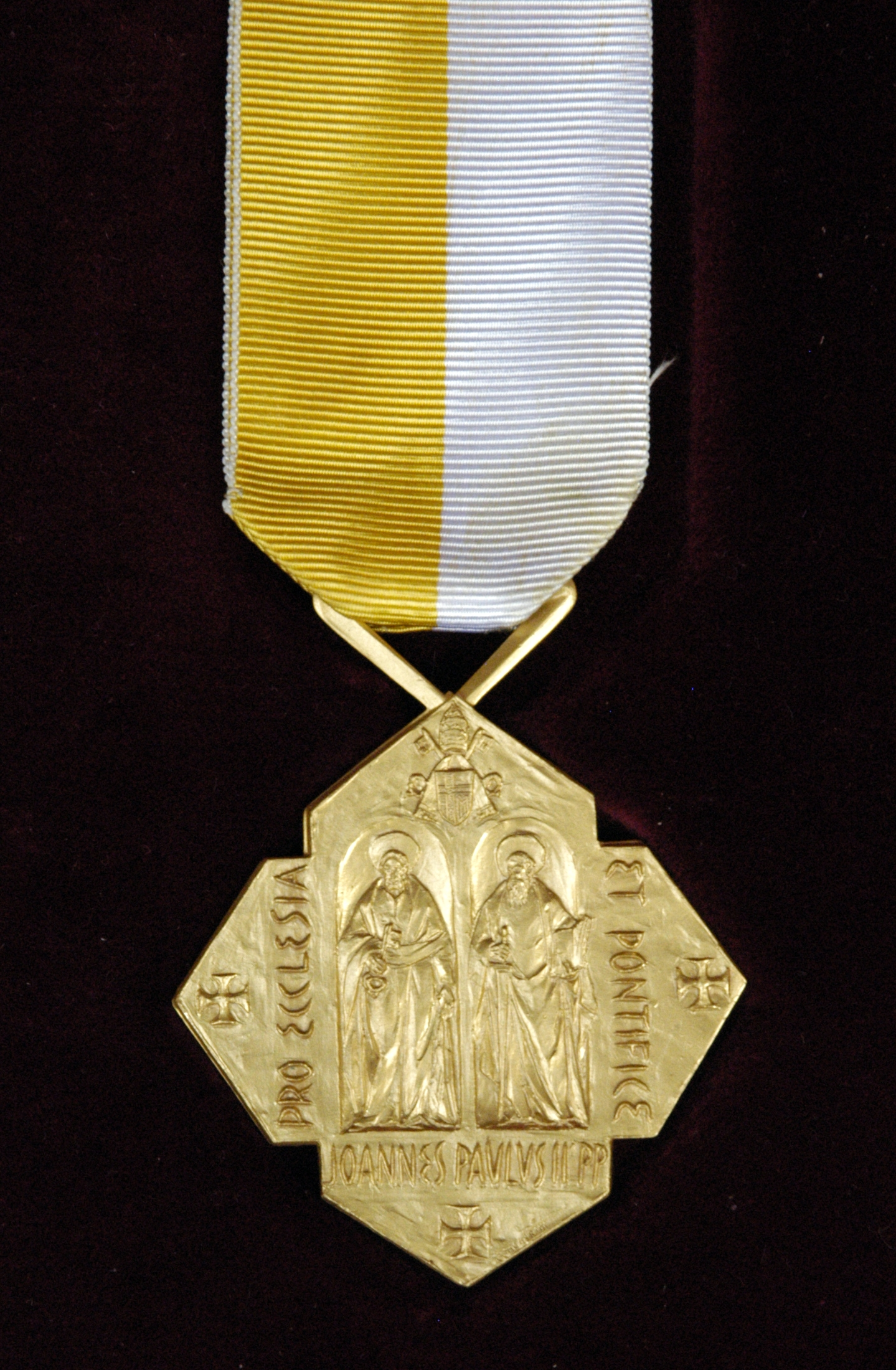
- Obverse of the medal during the pontificate of Pope John Paul II
- Awarded for: Rewarding those who in a general way deserve well of the pope on account of services done for the Church and its head
- Country: Holy See
- Presented by: Holy See
- Eligibility: Clergy and laity
- Status: Currently awarded
- Established: 17 July 1888
- Current ribbon Previous ribbon

Precedence
- Next (higher): Order of St. Sylvester
- Next (lower): Benemerenti Medal

Pro Ecclesia et Pontifice ("For Church and Pope" in Latin) is a decoration of the Holy See. It is currently conferred for distinguished service to the Catholic Church by lay people and clergy.

== History ==
The medal was established by Leo XIII on 17 July 1888 to commemorate his golden sacerdotal jubilee and was originally bestowed on the men and women who had aided and promoted the jubilee, and by other means assisted in making the jubilee and the Vatican Exposition successful.

In 1898, it became a permanent papal distinction. Pius X reduced the classes to a single one in 1908.

Until 1993, it was the highest honour that could be obtained by women.

== Appearance ==
=== 1888 version of Leo XIII ===
The cross was initially only cast in gold and silver. A bronze version was added later. On the medal is a cross made octangular by fleurs-de-lis fixed in the angles of the cross. The arms of the cross narrow towards the center, with slightly indented ends, approaching the form of the patonce cross. In the center of the cross is a small medal with the image of Leo XIII. The words "Leo XIII P. M. Anno X" (tenth year of his pontificate) circle the image. In the center of the reverse side are the papal emblems. The motto Pro Ecclesia et Pontifice is stamped in the circle surrounding the emblems.

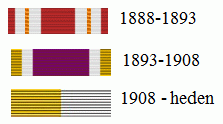
On the obverse side of the medal, the branches of the cross are comets, which, with the fleurs-de-lis, form the coat of arms of the Pecci family. Stamped on the reverse side are the words "Pridie" (on the left branch), "Kal" (on the top branch), and "Januar" (on the right branch) and the year "1888" (at the foot of the cross). The medal's ribbon is red, with delicate lines of white and yellow on each border. (Note: There is information about the existence of a purple ribbon with white-yellow edges, which should have been used from 1893 to 1908. Such a ribbon most certainly did not exist. It is probably the visual implementation based on the description in the papal letter Quod singulari Dei concessu: "[…] purpurei coloris linea alba flavaque ad utramque oram virgata dependeat […]". The translation of "purpurei coloris" as violet and "linea alba flavaque" as a yellow-white line leads to a different appearance of the ribbon. See:) The cross is worn on the left side of the breast. (Note: The frequently cited Catholic Encyclopedia article "Pontifical Decorations" . Catholic Encyclopedia. Vol. 4. 1908. wrongly states that the cross is worn on the right side.)

=== Current version since Paul VI ===
The current version was introduced by pope Paul VI and is only awarded in gold. The obverse depicts the Apostles Saint Peter and Saint Paul in the centre of the cross. The inscription Pro Ecclesia (For Church) is stamped on the left arm, Et Pontifice (And Pope) on the right. Three small crosses are situated at the end of the left, bottom and right cross arm. During the reigns of Paul VI and John Paul II, the top arm of the cross bore the coat of arms of the reigning Pope and his name in Latin on the bottom cross arm. The decoration's ribbon is in the papal yellow and white.

This design was modified under Benedict XVI: the personal arms of the reigning pope were replaced by a small cross, while the coat of arms of the Holy See replaced the small cross on the bottom arm. The name of the reigning pope no longer appears on the front.

== Gallery ==
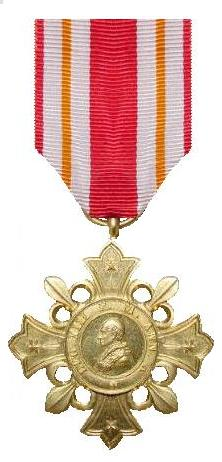
Version 1888

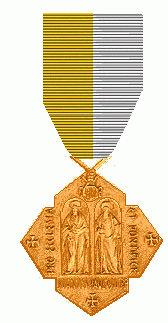
Version 1978–2005

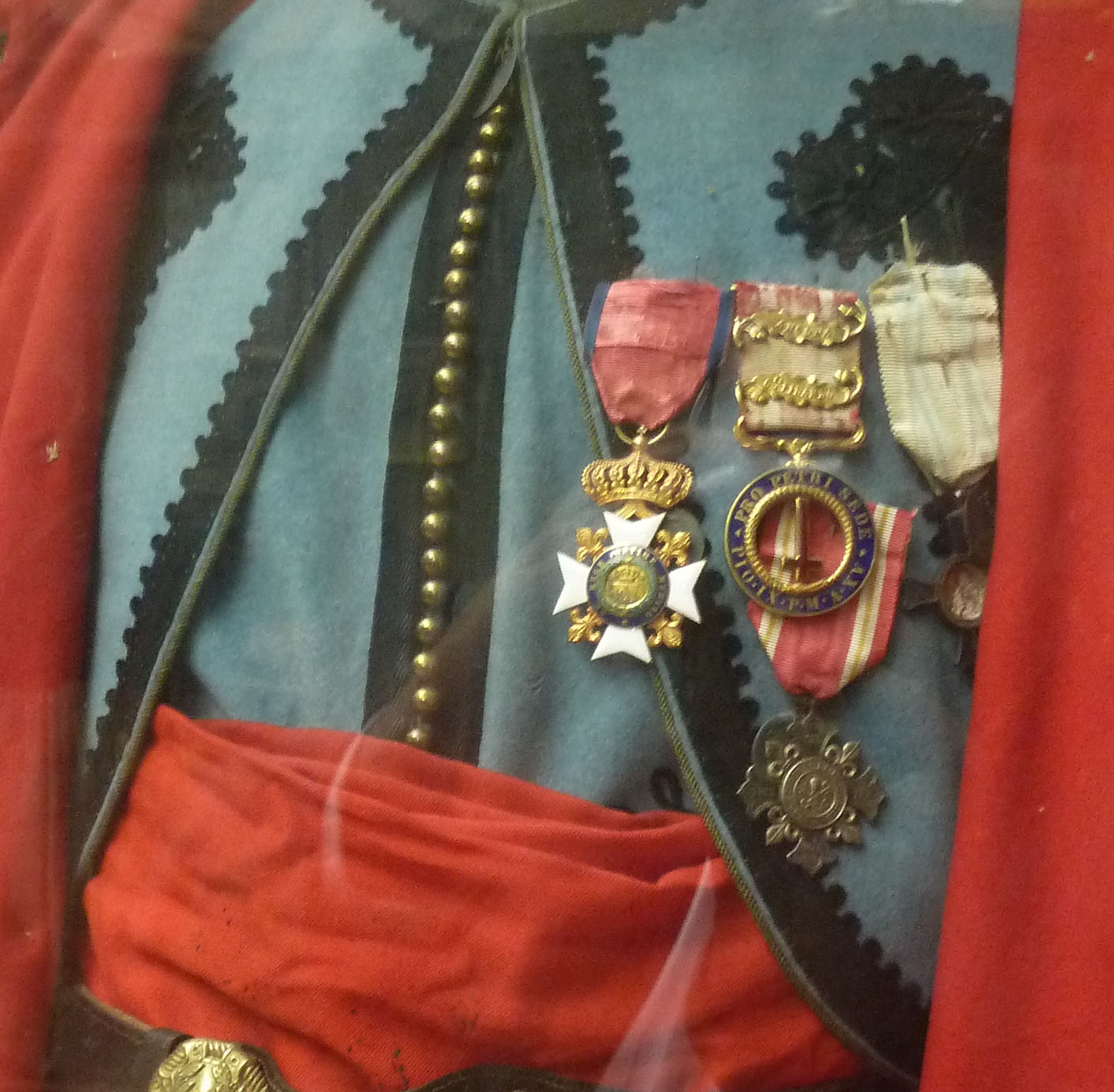
The medal on the uniform of a papal zouave

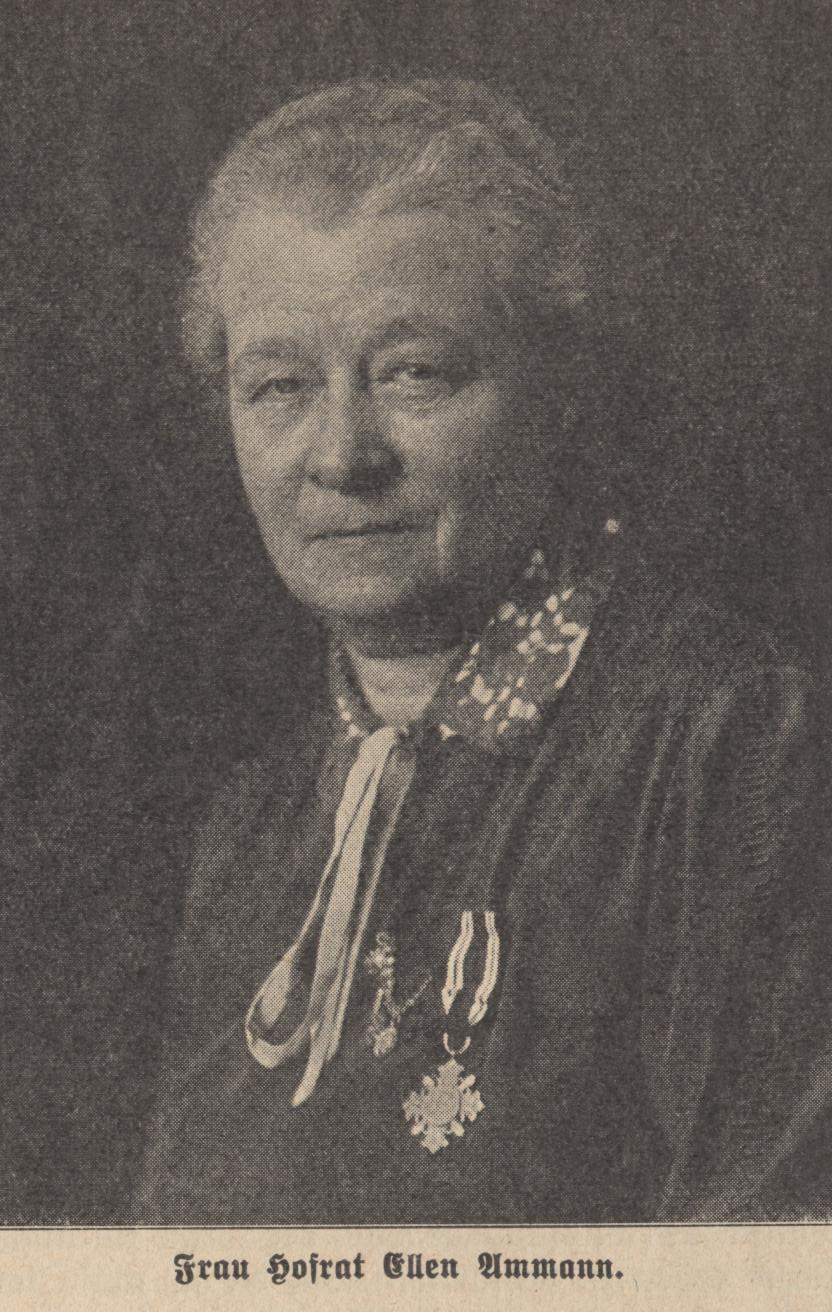
Ellen Ammann with Pro Ecclesia et Pontifice

== Notable recipients ==
=== Leo XIII (1878-1903) ===
- 1902 – Wilfred Spruson, Bessie Anstice Baker

=== Pius X (1903-1912) ===
- 1905 – Ivana Zorman
- 1908 – Marija Jambrišak
- 1909 - Mona B. Bickerstaffe
- 1910 – Emilie Hopmann

=== Benedict XV (1914-1922) ===
- 1914 – Ellen Ammann
- 1916 – Mary Kate Barlow, Milutin Mayer

=== Pius XI (1922-1939) ===
- 1924 – James Merry, organist and choirmaster of St Peter's, Cardiff, for over 40 years
- 1928 – Jano Köhler
- 1936 -- Rose Van Laanen of Green Bay, WI in recognition of her welfare work with Catholic girls
- 1938 - María Camino Sanz Orrio, President of Catholic Action during the Spanish Civil War.
- 1938 – Constance Le Plastrier, Agatha Le Breton
- 1938 – Catherine Bonifas

=== Pius XII (1939-1958) ===
- 1939 – Petra Vela de Vidal Kenedy
- 1942
  - Helen Murray Bradford, Past President Alumnae Association of Manhattanville College of the Sacred Heart
  - Marica Stanković
  - Lady Margaret Armstrong, president of the Ladies of Charity of the New York Archdiocese.
- 1947 – Edouard Heene
- 194x – Miguel Regidor Nadres
- 195x - Councillor Christiaan Verdult, Chelmsford's first Roman Catholic mayor for 'outstanding services to the church'
- 1950 - Manuel Dorta-Duque
- 1951 - May Roach, for tireless efforts at Central State Teachers College and in and around the Stevens Point, Wisconsin area.
- 1952 – Sarita Kenedy East
- 1953 - Mr Piet Senster, Kerkrade, Nederland
- 1954 – Ernest E. L. Hammer
- 1954 - Christiaan Hermanus Cornelis Alvares
- 1955 – Mrs. Emil Borth, for 50 years of service as organist at Sacred Heart Cathedral in Duluth, Minnesota, Richard Keys Biggs for 27 years of service as organist at Blessed Sacrament Catholic Church, Hollywood.

=== John XXIII (1958-1963) ===
- 1959 - Euphemia Lofton Haynes
- ? - Ricardo Ladrido

=== Paul VI (1963-1978) ===
- 19xx – Anna Langohr
- 1963 - Brother Mathias Barrett, Little Brothers of the Good Shepherd, Albuquerque, NM, USA; The Shepherd’s Call, July/Aug 1963.
- 1965 - David Whiteaker MM
- 1967 - Mary M. Schneider
- 1967 - Michael Mathew Colaço
- 1968 – Xavier Sewell
- 1969 - James Alberione and the Society of Saint Paul
- 1973 – William Maurice Carrigan
- 1977 – Kathleen Mary Burrow

=== John Paul II (1978-2005) ===
- 1979 – Ayako Sono
- 1979 - Chevalier Dr. T. Raja Pinheiro. He is from Punnaikayal, Pearl Fishery Coast of South India around Tuticorin.
- 1979 - Dr. A. Raja Pinheiro. Founder Chairman of Rajan Group of Companies M/s. Rajan Universals Mfrs. & Exports Pvt. Ltd. M/s. Amusements & Picnic Resort Pvt. Ltd. ( Dolphin City & Little Folks, Chennai ) M/s. Raj Inter Continental M/s. Raja Pinheiro Charitable Trust. he is from Punnaikayal Pearl Fishery Coast of South India around Tuticorin.
- 1979 – Ljubka Šorli
- 1982 - Mrs Margaret Meaney, for services to Pope John Paul II's visit to the United Kingdom as Press Co-Ordinator for Liverpool
- 1986 - Isabelle T. Farrington
- 1986 - Father Antonio Royo Marín, O.P.
- 1987 - Magdalena Villaba
- 1988 – Donald Swan, for Exceptional Service to Education in Greenwich, London
- 1989 - Alojzija Ulman
- 1990 – Bela Gabrić
- 1990 - Laureana Franco, for her exemplary service as a lay catechist in the Archdiocese of Manila
- 1991 - T. K. John Thekkumparampil, for exceptional service to the church and for his contributions to the establishment of the Syro-Malankara Catholic Church.
- 1992 - Thomas Zullo, for Exceptional and Lifelong Service to the Church in New York and California (Archdiocese of Los Angeles)
- 1992 - Joaan Zullo, for Exceptional and Lifelong Service to the Church in New York and California: Financial Director of St. Paschal Baylon Church from 1990 to 2021 (Archdiocese of Los Angeles)
- 1993 - Queen Silvia of Sweden
- 1995 - Constancia Baclig Madrid, Lay Minister and Catechist, St. Anne Parish of Buguey, Archdiocese of Tuguegarao, Cagayan Valley Philippines
- 1996 - Claire Henshall (Roman Catholic Diocese of Sale, Victoria Australia) Warragul Parish for her musical contribution as the organist to the parish for over 50 years
- 1997 - Father Robert Joseph Bedard, CC
- 1997 – Dolores R. Leckey
- 1997 – Father Francis G. Morrisey, O.M.I.
- ? – Conor Mullaly, OFM
- ? – Sister Margherita Marchione, MPF
- 1999 – Marko Malović, Vladimir Stanković, Fr. James Conn, SJ
- 2000 - Fr. Eduardo Hontiveros, SJ; Filipino Jesuit composer and musician, best known as an innovative hymnwriter behind popular Philippine liturgical music.
- 2001 - Francis and Barbara Scholtz
- 2003 – Mária Spoločníková, Ljubo Kuntarić
- 2005 – David J. Young, Esq., Brother Patrick Lovegrove, FSP.

=== Benedict XVI (2005-2013) ===
- 2006 – Rita Hamel Karing
- 2007 – Most Rev. Michael T. Martin, OFM Conv.
- 2008 – Emmanuel Latif, Stanisław Pawlina, FDP
- 2009 – Mons. João Scognamiglio Clá Dias, T.O.Carm, E.P.
- 2009 – Fr James Higgins SMA
- 2009 – Mother Mary Angelica of the Annunciation, PCPA
- 2010 − Bonaventura Duda
- 2012 − Gayle Benson and Tom Benson

In April 2013, the Pro Ecclesia et Pontifice Cross was conferred upon Fr. John Geaney, C.S.P., by Pope Benedict XVI. This honor is an award of the Holy See.

=== Francis (2013-2025) ===
- 2013 – Paul Salamunovich
- 2014- Roberto Servitje Sendra
- 2016 - Léon Bernard Mathilde Giot. Belgian baritone, choirmaster of more than 5 choirs, conductor of the one and only church symphonic orchestra, singing teacher, National Coordinator for Belgium for the World Voice Day, member of the International Federation of Choral Music, chief editor, journalist, Knight of the Belgian Cross, diplôme de Médaille d'Or Arts-Sciences-Lettres de Paris, cantor and organist in more than 17 parishes and 4 dioceses, singer of the national anthem at various national ceremonies, founder of the international singing school based on natural breathing and diction for singers. ( Papal parchment dd 22 / 11 / 2016 )
- 2016 - Ai-Ai delas Alas, Filipina actress and comedian. For distinguished service to the church in the Diocese of Novaliches.
- 2017 – Anne Ward, for considerable contribution to the musical life of the Diocese of Arundel and Brighton. Marilyn Roberts Archdiocese of Liverpool.
- 2017 - Sr. Rafaela Wlodarczak, for her work with children orphaned due to the Israeli-Palestinian conflict. Aleteia, 26 Oct 2023 https://aleteia.org/2018/01/11/the-polish-nun-who-wore-rubber-boots-and-carried-heavy-steel-to-build-a-house-for-war-orphans/.
- 2018 – Father Peter Michael Ryan, Joseph Orzech, Henry Tupaj Sr. Daisy Domingo, Diocese of San Jose, California USA.
- 2019 – Father Philip G. Bochanski, Helen McConnell, Philip J. Miraglia, Louise M. Sullivan, Manuel A. Beltran, Sister Maureen Crissy, RSM, Becky Espanol, Kevin L. Hughes, Sister Patricia Kelly, MSBT, Brother Richard E. Kestler, FSC, Jose L. Lozad, Matthew McCloskey, Sister Anne Patricia Myers, SSJ, Sister M. Edward William Quinn, IHM, Thomas W. Smith
- 2020 – Emile Wijntuin, former Chairman of the National Assembly of Suriname.
- 2021 – Deirdre Leach MBE, Rev. Peter E. Sousa, CSsR, Rafael Manzano Martos, Manoj Durairaj
- 2021 - Nova Villa, Actress and Mother Butler Guild member, Diocese of Novaliches
- 2022 – Pura Sumangil, nun, educator, and social activist, Philippines
- 2022 – John Bernard Flynn, Pat Kennedy Diocese of Hexham and Newcastle
- 2022 – Fr. Ernesto O. Javier, S.J., Alejandro Aguspina Jr, Archdiocese of Cebu, and 7 other recipients
- 2023 - Catherine O’Leary, Liverpool Archdiocesan Centre for Evangelisation (LACE), Brother Nicholas Harsas, FSP.
- 2024 - Mary Greene (Wallace), Church of the Assumption, Taghmon, Diocese of Meath
- 2024 - Fr. Alexander Ninkovic, Archdiocese of Belgrade, Serbia.
- 2024 - Pétur Marteinn Páll Urbancic, Iceland.
- 2024 - Artemio Panganiban, for his church conservation activities, as the President of the Manila Metropolitan Cathedral-Basilica Foundation.
- 2024 - Giuseppe Frascaroli

== See also ==
- List of ecclesiastical decorations
