= Escanaba Senior High School =

Location
- 500 S. Lincoln Road; Escanaba, Michigan 49829; United States; 45°44′28″N 87°04′56″W

Information
- School district: Escanaba Area Public Schools
- Superintendent: Coby Fletcher
- Principal: N/A
- Teaching staff: 54.40 (on an FTE basis)
- Grades: 6-12
- Enrollment: 1,089 (2024-2025)
- Student to teacher ratio: 20.02
- Colors: Orange; Black
- Fight song: Esky Fight Song
- Athletics: MHSAA Class B
- Athletics conference: Great Northern UP Conference; Big North Conference (football only)
- Nickname: Eskymos
- Rival: Gladstone High School; Marquette Senior High School
- Yearbook: Escanaban
- Website: www.eskymos.com/schools/jr-sr

Escanaba Junior / Senior High School (also known as EHS or simply Esky) is a public high school in Escanaba, Michigan. It is the sole high school in the Escanaba Area Public Schools district, and serves grades 6–12.

== Demographics ==
The demographic breakdown of the 786 students enrolled in 2018-19 was:

- Male - 48.6%
- Female - 51.4%
- Native American - 3.9%
- Asian - 0.4%
- Black - 0.4%
- Hispanic - 0.9%
- White - 92.9%
- Multiracial - 1.5%

In addition, 40.7% of students were eligible for reduced-price or free lunch.

== Notable alumni ==
- Chauncey W. Yockey (1877–1936), politician
- Tom Casperson (1959–2020), politician
- Kevin Tapani (b. 1964), professional baseball player
- Josh Parisian (b. 1989), mixed martial artist
