= Casillas (surname) =

Casillas is a Spanish surname that may refer to

- Andrés Casillas de Alba (born 1934), Mexican architect
- Giovani Casillas (born 1994), Mexican association football player
- Graciela Casillas (born 1957), American boxer and kickboxer
- Hugo Casillas (born 1981), Mexican association football player
- Iker Casillas (born 1981), Spanish football goalkeeper
- Jesús Casillas Romero (born 1962), Mexican politician
- Luis Casíllas (1905–?), Mexican modern pentathlete
- Martín Casillas (1556–1618), Spanish architect
- Jonathan Casillas (born 1987), American football linebacker
- Susana Casillas, Mexican visual artist
- Toñín Casillas (born 1935), Puerto Rican basketball player
- Tony Casillas (born 1963), American football defensive lineman
