= Marist =

Marist is a noun or adjective derived from the name Mary – in particular Mary the Mother of Jesus Christ. It may refer to:

== Catholic religious orders or congregations ==
- Marist Brothers, also known as the Little Brothers of Mary and the Marist Brothers of the Schools
- Society of Mary (Marists), also known as the Marist Fathers
- Marist Sisters, a Catholic religious congregation of women
- Missionary Sisters of the Society of Mary, also known as The Marist Missionary Sisters

== Sporting clubs ==
- Marist F.C., a football club in the Solomon Islands
- Marist St. Joseph, a club in Samoa
- Marista Rugby Club, a rugby union club in Argentina
- Wellington Marist, a club in Wellington, New Zealand
- Palmerston North Marist, a club in Palmerston North, New Zealand
- Marist Saints, a rugby league club in Auckland, New Zealand
- Marist Brothers Old Boys RFC in Auckland, New Zealand
- Marist Rugby Club in Fiji
- Marist Rugby Club in Tonga

== Schools ==
- Marist College, Athlone, a Catholic boys school in Athlone, Ireland
- Marist University, Poughkeepsie, New York, USA
  - Marist Poll, survey
- Marist College Ashgrove, a Catholic boys' college located in Ashgrove, Australia
- Marist Catholic College North Shore, Coeducational Catholic K-12 school in North Sydney, Australia
- Marist College Eastwood, secondary day school for boys in Eastwood, Sydney, New South Wales, Australia
- Marist College Kogarah, secondary day school for boys in Kogarah, Sydney, New South Wales, Australia
- Marist School - Marikina, Philippines, a private Catholic school for boys
- Marist High School (Chicago), Chicago, USA
- Marist High School (Bayonne, New Jersey), USA
- Marist Catholic High School, Eugene, Oregon USA
- Marist School (Brookhaven, Georgia), USA
- The Marist School, Sunninghill, Berkshire, England
- Marist Brothers International School in Kobe, Japan
- Séminaire des Pères Maristes, in Quebec City, Canada
- Marist College Canberra, Canberra, Australia
- Colégio Marista Dom Silvério, a private school in Belo Horizonte, Brazil
- Colegio Marista Guaynabo, a private school in Puerto Rico, United States
- Marist Brothers High School, Fiji, a Roman Catholic all-boys' high school in Suva, Fiji

== Structures ==
- Marist Stadium, a sports stadium in Lotopa, Samoa
- Marist House, the Administration Centre of St Bede's College, Christchurch, New Zealand
- Villa Marista, a prison in Havana, Cuba
- Marista Hall, also known as Chevrolet Hall, a convention centre in Belo Horizonte, Brazil

== See also ==
- Marista (disambiguation)
