= Marista =

Marista may refer to:

- Colégio Marista Dom Silvério, a private school in Belo Horizonte, Brazil
- Colegio Marista Guaynabo, a private school in Puerto Rico, United States
- Marista Hall, now Arena Hall, a convention centre in Belo Horizonte, Brazil
- Marista Rugby Club, a sports club in Luján de Cuyo, Mendoza Province, Argentina
- Villa Marista, a prison in Havana, Cuba
- Marista Leishman (1932–2019), English author and educator

== See also ==
- Marist (disambiguation)
- Maritsa (disambiguation)
