= Casillas =

Casillas may refer to:

- Casillas, Guatemala, a municipality in the department of Santa Rosa, Guatemala
- Casillas, Ávila, a municipality located in the province of Ávila, Castile and León, Spain
- Casillas de Coria, a municipality located in the province of Cáceres, Extremadura, Spain
- Casillas de Flores, a municipality located in the province of Salamanca, Castile and León, Spain
- Casillas de Camineros, structures built every 6 kilometers alongside major roads in Puerto Rico
- Casillas (surname)
