= Buendía =

Buendía or Buendia means "good day" in Spanish, and may refer to:

== Places ==
- Buendía, Cuenca, a town in Spain
- Buendia station, a depressed MRT Line 3 station in Makati, Philippines
- Buendia railway station, a Philippine National Railways station
- Buendía, a coffee factory in Chinchiná, Caldas
- Gil Puyat Avenue, a major road in Metro Manila, formerly and still commonly referred to as Buendia Avenue

== Other ==
- Buendía (surname)
- One Hundred Years of Solitude, a 1967 novel by Gabriel García Márquez, describes many generations of the fictional Buendía family.
