= Jesús Romero =

Jesús Romero may refer to:

- Jesús Adrián Romero, Mexican author, Christian music singer, composer, and pastor
- Jesús Casillas Romero, Mexican Institutional Revolutionary Party politician
- Jesús Escandell Romero, president of the Cuban trade union Central de Trabajadores Cubanos
- Jesús Romero Martín (born 1984), Spanish wheelchair basketball player
- Jesús Zúñiga Romero, Mexican New Alliance Party politician
