= Maritza =

Maritza is a name of Spanish origin and may refer to:

- Maritza M. Buendía (born 1974), Mexican award winning writer
- Maritza Correia (born 1981), Puerto Rican swimmer
- Maritza Olivares, Mexican actress
- Maritza Rodríguez, Colombian actress
- Maritza Salas (born 1975), Puerto Rican track and field athlete
- Maritza Sayalero (born 1961), Venezuelan model and beauty pageant titleholder
- Sari Maritza (1910–1987), English actress
- Maritza Bossé-Pelchat, contestant on season 1 of Star Académie

== See also ==
- Maritsa (disambiguation)
- Maritsa Iztok Complex, Bulgarian power complex
- Countess Maritza, English adaptation of Hungarian operetta Gräfin Mariza
