= Marica =

Marica may refer to:

- Marica (mythology), a nymph in Roman mythology
- Maricá, Rio de Janeiro, Brazil
- Maritsa, a river in Bulgaria, alternatively spelled Marica
- Marica, a former brush-footed butterfly genus now included in Erebia
- Beraba marica, a species of beetle in the family Cerambycidae
- Eucereon marica, a moth of the subfamily Arctiinae

== People ==
- Maricá (footballer) (born 1979), Brazilian footballer who played among others for AEK

Given name

- Marica Bodrožić (born 1973), German writer of Croatian descent
- Marica Branchesi (born 1977), Italian astrophysicist
- Marica Gajić (born 1995), Bosnian basketball player
- Marica Hase (born 1981), Japanese gravure model and actress
- Marica Josimčević (born 1946), Serbian writer and translator
- Marica Malović-Đukić (born 1949), Serbian historian
- Marica Mikulová (1951–2024), Slovak puppeteer and theatre director
- Marica Nadlišek Bartol (1867–1940), Slovenian writer and editor
- Marica Perišić (born 2000), Serbian judoka
- Marica (Marija) Stanković (1900–1957), also known as "Sister Marica", Croatian school teacher and writer
- Marica Stražmešter (born 1981), Serbian Olympic swimmer
- Marica Vilcek (born 1936), American art historian

Surname

- Ciprian Marica (born 1985), Romanian footballer

== See also ==
- Marika (disambiguation)
- Maritsa (disambiguation)
