= Murica =

Murica may refer to:

- Murica, a working title for the album The Algorithm, by American rock band Filter
- 'Murica, an eye dialect slang term referring to the United States

== See also ==
- Merica, a genus of sea snails
- Marica (disambiguation)
- Murcia (disambiguation)
  - Murcia, a Spanish city
- Murika, village in Estonia
