= KM de Vantagens Hall =

KM de Vantagens Hall may refer to:

- KM de Vantagens Hall (Belo Horizonte), an events centre
- KM de Vantagens Hall (Rio de Janeiro), a music venue
