= Maritsa (disambiguation) =

The Maritsa is a river that runs through the Balkans.

Maritsa may also refer to:

- Maritsa Municipality, a municipality in Plovdiv Province, Bulgaria
  - FC Maritsa Plovdiv, Bulgarian football club from the city of Plovdiv founded in 1921
- Maritsa, Rhodes, a village on the Greek island of Rhodes
- Maritsa Peak, peak in the South Shetland Islands
- Maritsa Iztok Complex, an energy complex near Stara Zagora, Bulgaria
- Battle of Maritsa, battle that took place at the Maritsa River near the village of Chernomen on September 26, 1371
- "Shumi Maritsa", the Bulgarian national anthem from 1886 until 1944

== See also ==
- Marista (disambiguation)
- Maritza (disambiguation)
- Marica (disambiguation)
- Meriç (disambiguation)
