= Guadalajara Cathedral =

Coordinates: 20.67723°N 103.34699°W

- Cathedral-Basilica of the Assumption of Our Lady
- Catedral Basílica de la Asunción de María Santísima (Spanish)
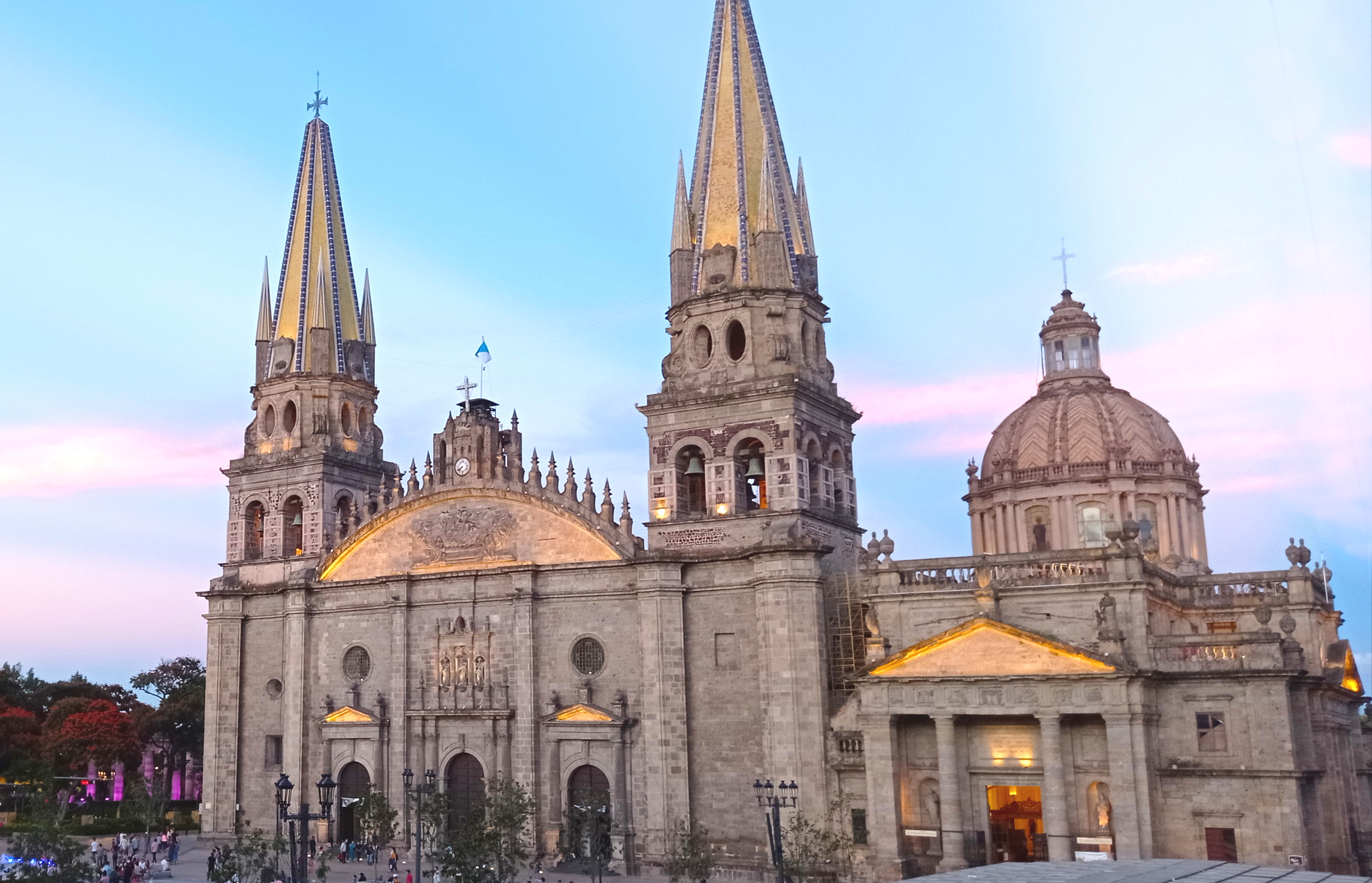
- Guadalajara Cathedral
- Guadalajara Cathedral
- Location: Guadalajara, Mexico
- Denomination: Catholic
- Tradition: Roman Rite

History
- Status: Cathedral, Minor basilica
- Dedication: Assumption of Mary

Architecture
- Architect: Martín Casillas Manuel Gómez Ibarra
- Style: Spanish Renaissance, Neo-gothic, Neoclassical
- Groundbreaking: 31 July 1561
- Completed: 1618

Administration
- Archdiocese: Guadalajara

The Guadalajara Cathedral or Cathedral of the Assumption of Our Lady (Spanish: Catedral de Guadalajara or Catedral de la Asunción de María Santísima), located in Centro, Guadalajara, Jalisco, is the Roman Catholic cathedral of the Archdiocese of Guadalajara and a minor basilica. The cathedral of Guadalajara is among the oldest in the Americas, together with examples such as the cathedral of Mérida and the Cathedral of Santo Domingo in the Dominican Republic. It was built during the late Renaissance in the Spanish Renaissance style, except for its neo-Gothic spires which were built in the 19th century.

== History ==
The first cathedral was built in 1541 on the site of the present Templo de Santa Maria de Gracia. This primitive church was built with adobe and a thatched roof. Nevertheless, in 1548 the region was declared a diocese by the Holy See and the church became the cathedral of the city.

On May 30, 1574, during Mass, neighbors fired shots into the air. Some of the bullets fell onto the cathedral and started a fire, severely damaging the building. Work began on a new cathedral designed by master architect Martín Casillas, which was commissioned in 1561 by King Felipe II, but progressed slowly because of scarce funds. The new cathedral was completed in February 1618. Finally in April of that year, the Blessed Sacrament was moved from the former church to the new one; however, it would not be consecrated until October 12, 1716. In the early morning of 31 May, 1818, an earthquake shook the city, causing the towers and the dome to collapse. These were replaced, but the new structures were destroyed by a subsequent earthquake in 1849. After years of remaining damaged, Bishop Diego Aranda contacted to Manuel Gómez Ibarra for the design of the new towers, which are covered by Talavera-style yellow and blue mosaics. The more recent Basilica of Covadonga in Asturias features strikingly similar towers. Ibarra was a Guadalajara native and was previously known for his work on other buildings such as the Hospicio Cabañas. Construction started on 30 July, 1851 and ended three years later on 15 July, 1854, and cost 33,521 pesos. Pope Pius XII elevated the cathedral to the rank of a minor basilica.

Currently, the cathedral continues to be in danger: it was damaged by earthquakes in 1932, 1957, 1979, 1985, 1995 and 2003. Current threats include a slight tilt of the north tower and structural damage to the dome.

The cathedral houses the mummified body of Santa Innocencia (a young girl from the 1700s who, according to legend, was killed by her father for converting to Catholicism), well as the remains of three cardinals and several other former bishops of the diocese, and Fr. Juan Jesús Posadas Ocampo, who was assassinated in 1993 at the Guadalajara International Airport.

== Architectural details ==
The cathedral occupies an area that is 77.8 x 72.75 meters, with a total area of around 5,660 square meters. The cathedral follows a basilica plan with three naves and is split into 6 sections using columns. The cathedral is built using adobe, yellow stone quarry and tezontle, a volcanic rock typically red in color, that is commonly used in Mexico . The interior of the cathedral has altars that are dedicated to Our Lady of the Assumption, Our Lady of Guadalupe, Our Lady of Sorrows, Our Lady of Zapopan (patron saint of Guadalajara), Saint Dominic, St. Nicholas, St. Thomas Aquinas, St. Christopher and St. John of God.

=== Exterior ===
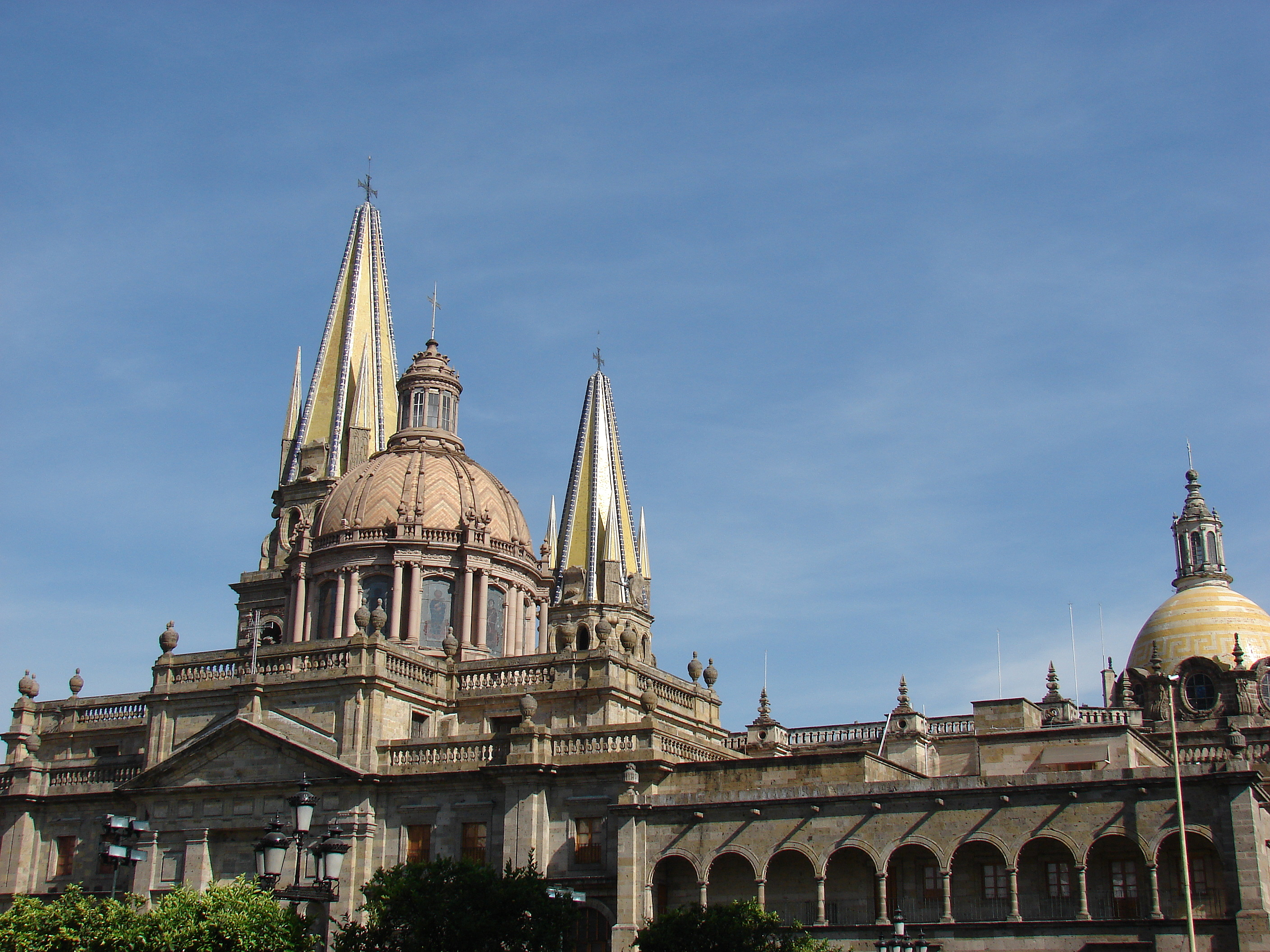
Lateral view of the cathedral's exterior.

The exterior of the cathedral is influenced by Spanish Renaissance architecture, however, the two towers take influence from Neo-Gothic architecture. The main building is geometric and proportional, typical of a basilica plan. The front of the cathedral has pilasters in colossal order framing the largest entrance. The entrances at the front are semicircular arches with pilasters on either side. The base of the towers are square with four pinnacles that lead into conical towers topped with Greek crosses. The top of the towers are yellow with blue tile accents.

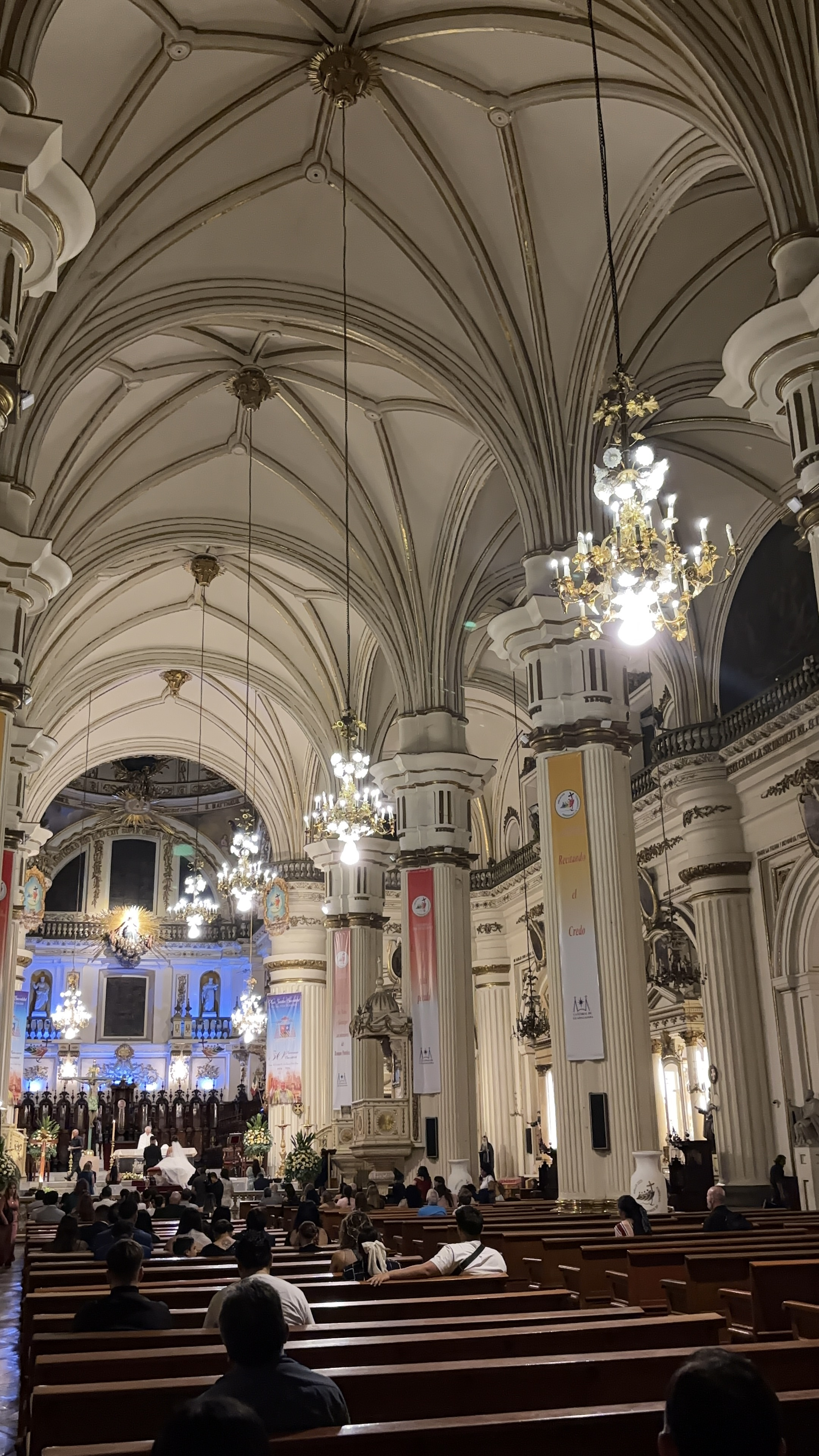
Main interior nave.

=== Interior ===
The center nave contains the altar, which is made of marble and silver. The cathedral is decorated with paintings done by various known artists, depicting religious scenes. The dome at the rear end of the cathedral is decorated with stain glass depicting various biblical scenes. The stained glass was imported from France.

On the left side, as well as the south side, are where administrative spaces are located that holds the office of the archbishop and the temple Sagrario Metropolitano of Guadalajara, which has a temple front facade.

In the north nave, located under the north tower, there is a chapel dedicated to El Señor de las Aguas (Lord of the Waters), with five additional altars each dedicated to an important religious figure. The left nave, located under the south tower, has another chapel dedicated to Nuestra Señora de la Soledad (Our Lady of Solitude), with an additional 4 altars also dedicated to important religious figures.

== Gallery ==
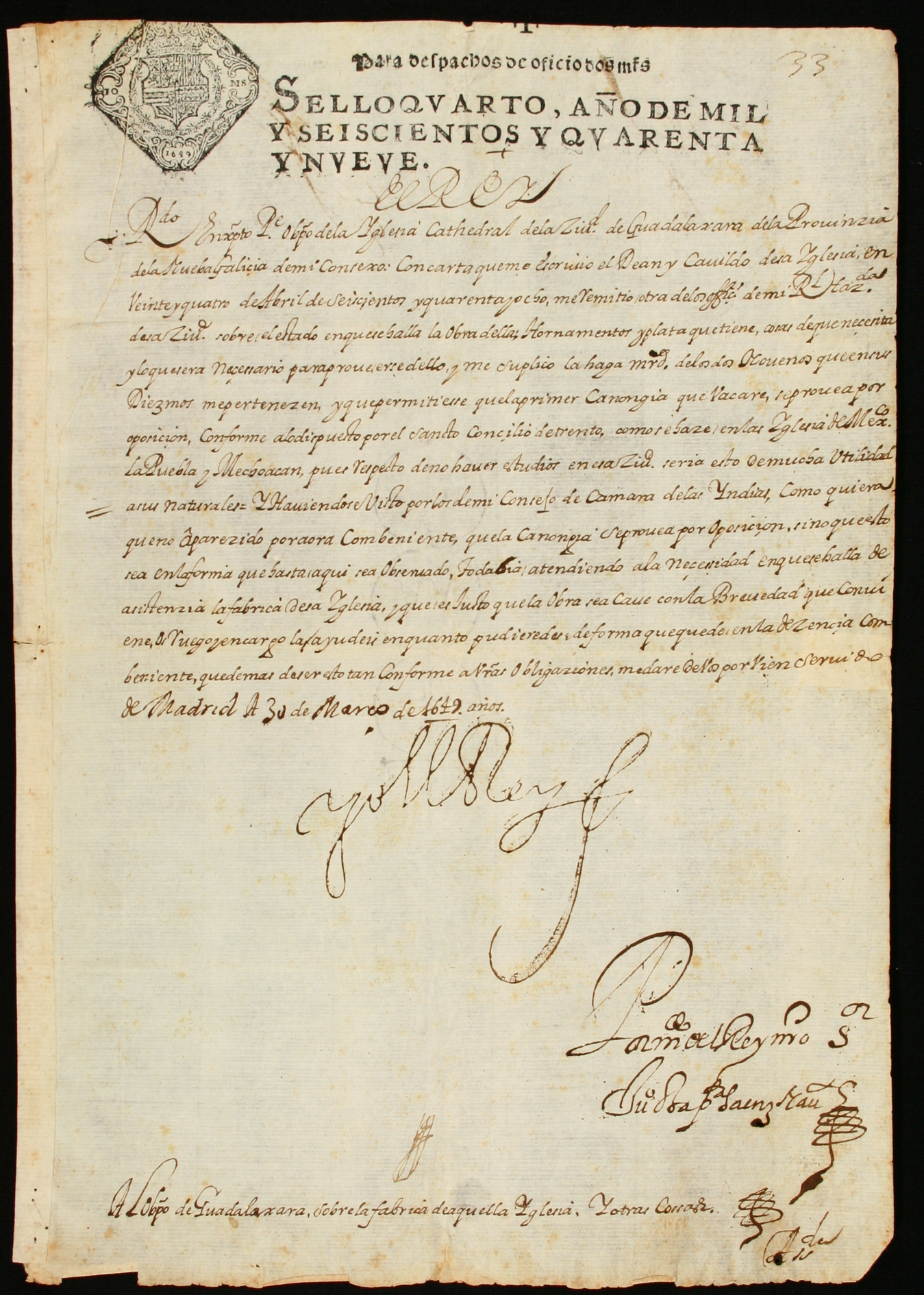
Royal Decree (Real cédula) of 1649 signed by Juan Bautista Sáenz Navarrete so that the construction of the Cathedral of Guadalajara, Mexico, is finished soon.

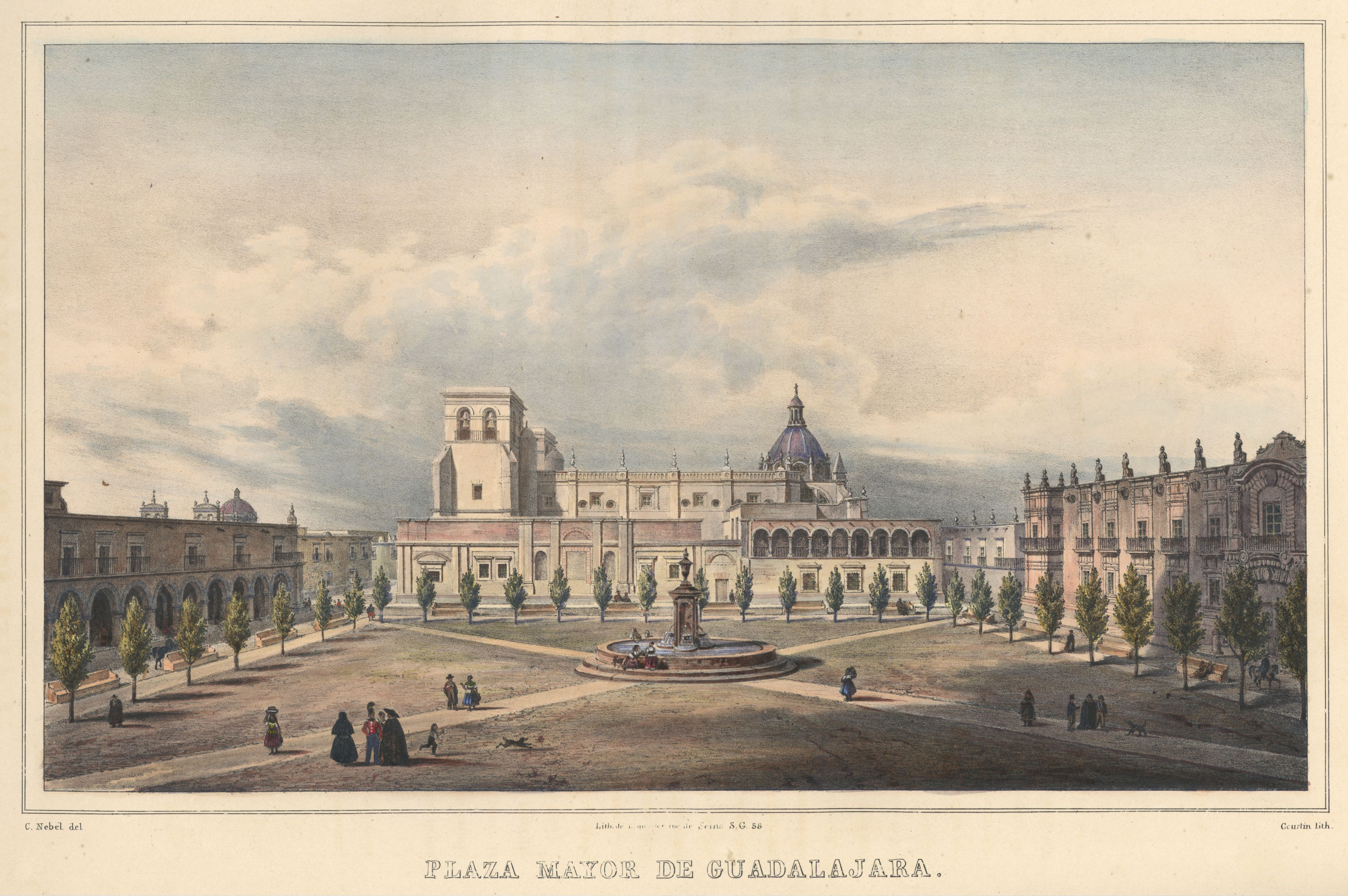
Guadalajara cathedral (without current neogothic towers) around 1836.

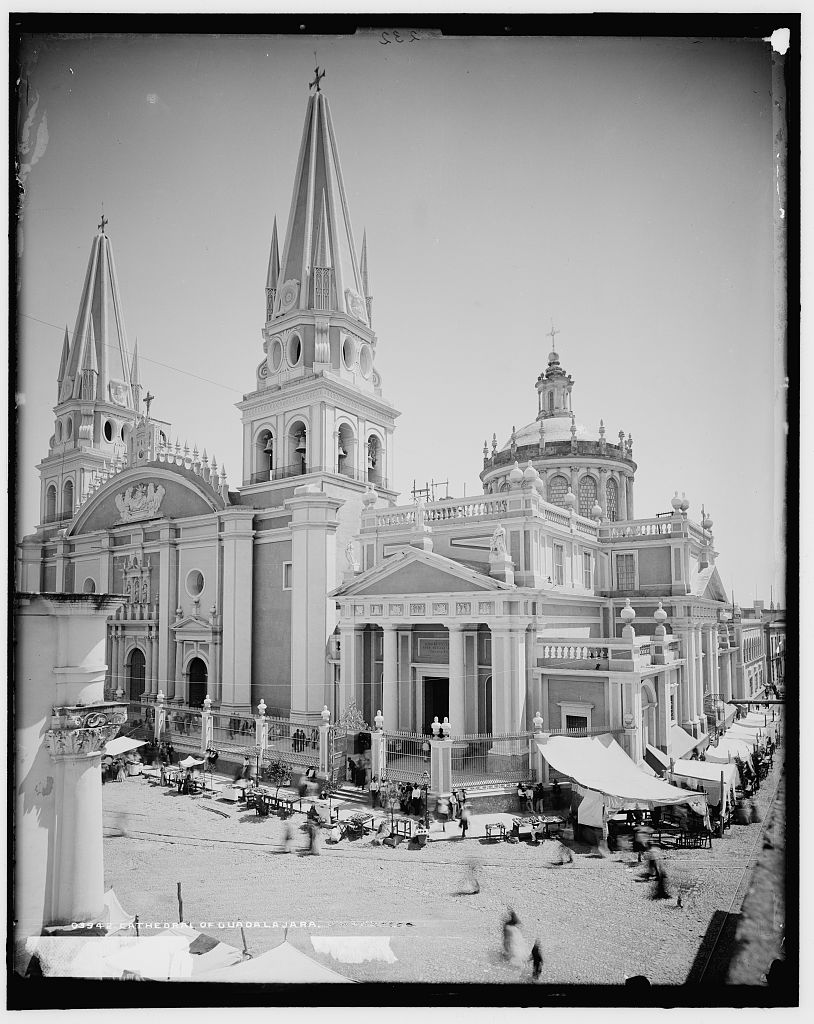
Guadalajara cathedral circa 1890.

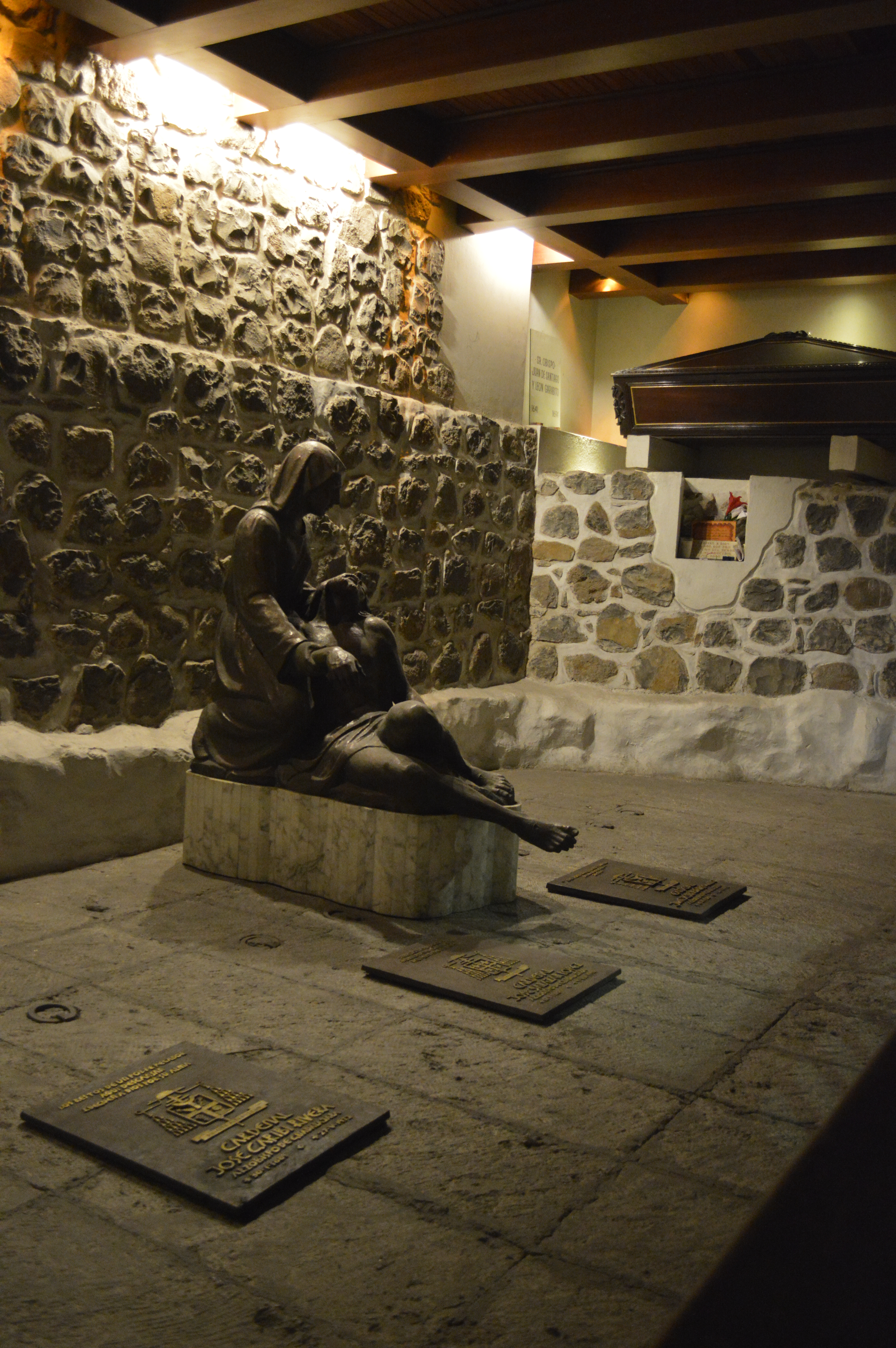
Archiepiscopal crypt.

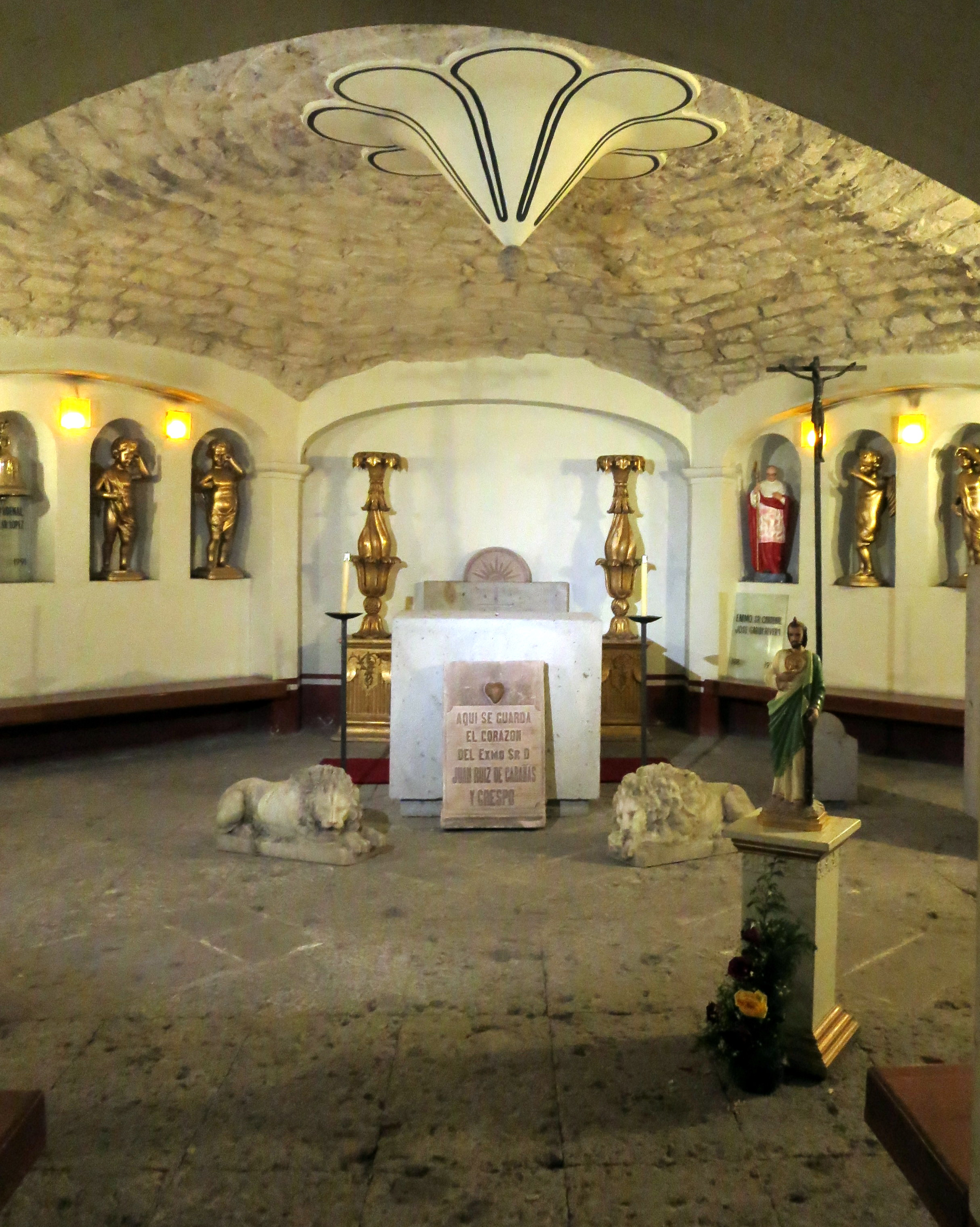
Crypt with martyrs of the Cristero War.

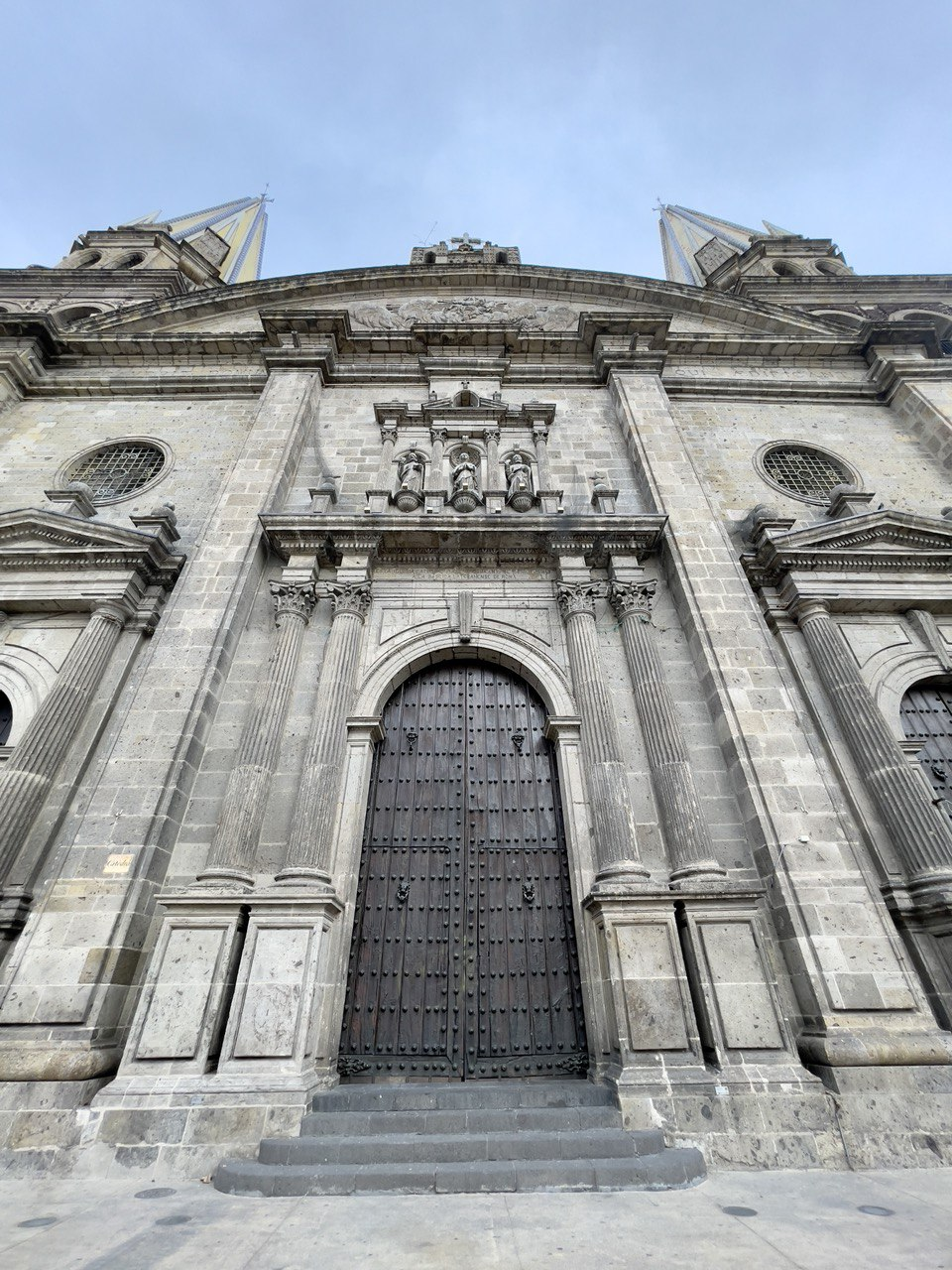
Detail of the facade.

== See also ==
- Basilica of Our Lady of Zapopan
- List of basilicas
