= Murcia (disambiguation) =

Murcia is the capital city of the Region of Murcia in Spain.

Murcia may also refer to:

== Places ==
- Region of Murcia, a single-province autonomous community in southeast Spain
  - Murcia (Spanish Congress Electoral District)
  - Taifa of Murcia, medieval Muslim municipality
- Murcia, Negros Occidental, a town in the Philippines

== People ==
- Billy Murcia, a Colombian-born American musician who was the original drummer for the New York Dolls
- José Murcia, a Spanish footballer
- Santiago de Murcia, a Spanish guitarist and composer

== Other uses ==
- Murcia (mythology), a little-known goddess in ancient Rome

== See also ==
- Mercia (disambiguation)
- Murica (disambiguation)
- Mursia
