= Meric =

Meric or Méric or Meriç may refer to:

== Méric ==
- Méric Casaubon (1599–1671), French-English classical scholar

== Meriç ==
=== Places and geography ===
- Meriç (river), Turkish name for the Maritsa which runs through the Balkans
- Meriç, the Turkish name of Mora, Cyprus, a town in Northern Cyprus
- Meriç, Edirne, a town and district of Edirne Province, Turkey

=== People ===
- Meriç Banu Yenal (born 1988), Turkish female basketball player
- Meriç Yurdatapan (born 1972), German-Turkish female jazz singer
- Hurşut Meriç (born 1983), Dutch-Turkish male footballer

== See also ==
- Maritsa (disambiguation)
