= Marika (disambiguation) =

Marika is a given name and surname.

Marika may also refer to:

- Marika (film), a 1938 Hungarian comedy drama
- Marika (singer) (Marta Kosakowska, born 1980), a Polish vocalist
- Marika, Hunters Hill, a house in New South Wales, Australia
- Marika, a 1984 album by Bonga
- Queen Marika, a fictional character in the 2022 video game Elden Ring

== See also ==
- The Truth About Marika, a 2007 Swedish TV series and reality game
- Marikaj, a village in Tirana County, Albania
- Maryka, a given name
