= Buendía (surname) =

Buendía or Buendia means "good day" in Spanish and may refer to the following people:

- Ángel Buendía Tirado (born 1951), Mexican economist and politician
- Ely Buendia (born 1970), Filipino writer and musician
- Emi Buendía (born 1996), Argentine footballer
- General Juan Buendía, Peruvian military leader at the Battle of San Francisco
- Jeremy Buendia (born 1990), American professional bodybuilder
- Juan Buendía (1816–1895), Peruvian military man
- Manuel Buendía (1926–1984), Mexican political columnist
- Maritza M. Buendía (born 1974), Mexican award winning writer
- Miguel Maury Buendía (born 1955), Spanish prelate of the Catholic Church
- Nicolas Buendia (1879–1958), Filipino politician
- Pablo Buendía (born 1986), Spanish football defender
- Ruth Buendía (born 1977), Peruvian indigenous activist
- Ryan Buendia (born c. 1982), American recording artist, DJ, producer, and songwriter
- Silvia Buendía (born 1967), Ecuadorian lawyer, TV host, columnist, and feminist activist
- Soledad Buendía, Ecuadorian politician
