= Basilica of Our Lady of Zapopan =

Cathedral in Mexico

- Basílica de Nuestra Señora de Zapopan
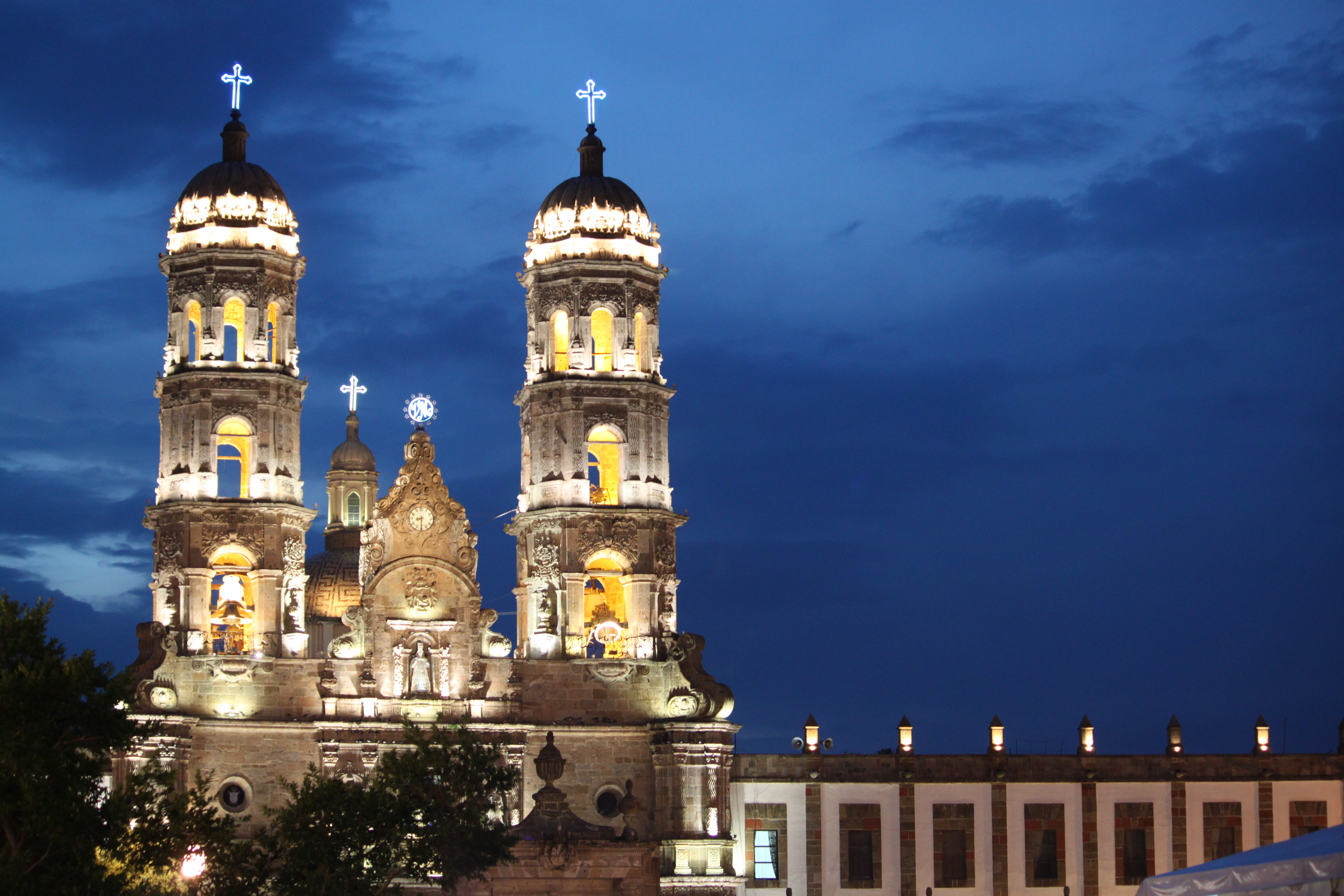
- The Basilica of Our Lady of Zapopan 2019
- Basilica of Our Lady of Zapopan
- 20.7213°N 103.3923°W
- Country: Mexico
- Denomination: Roman Catholic

History
- Dedicated: 17 March 1866

Architecture
- Architectural type: Baroque

Administration
- Archdiocese: Guadalajara

The Basilica of Our Lady of Zapopan (Spanish: Basílica de Nuestra Señora de Zapopan) and the abbey of the same name are a 17th-century Franciscan sanctuary built in downtown Zapopan, in the state of Jalisco, Mexico.

It is one of the most visited sanctuaries in Western Mexico, and it preserves a wooden Virgin that is considered a valuable relic of medieval origin, which came from Spain to New Galicia in the 16th century. The Huichol Museum is located in the building.

== Catholic affiliations ==
The church complex belongs to the Franciscan province of Sts. Francis and James (Francisco y Santiago), that includes Jalisco, Monterrey, Guanajuato, and Zacatecas. Affiliated with the church is a retirement home of the Valle de la Misericordia (Valley of Mercy).

The abbey is made up of members of the Franciscan Order of Friars Minor, though it is also used by the Capuchin, Third order, Society of Saint Francis, the Clarisse, and Franciscan sisters. It has also worked with the Dominicans and the Franciscan Youth (Youfra) of Roch.

== Virgin of Zapopan ==
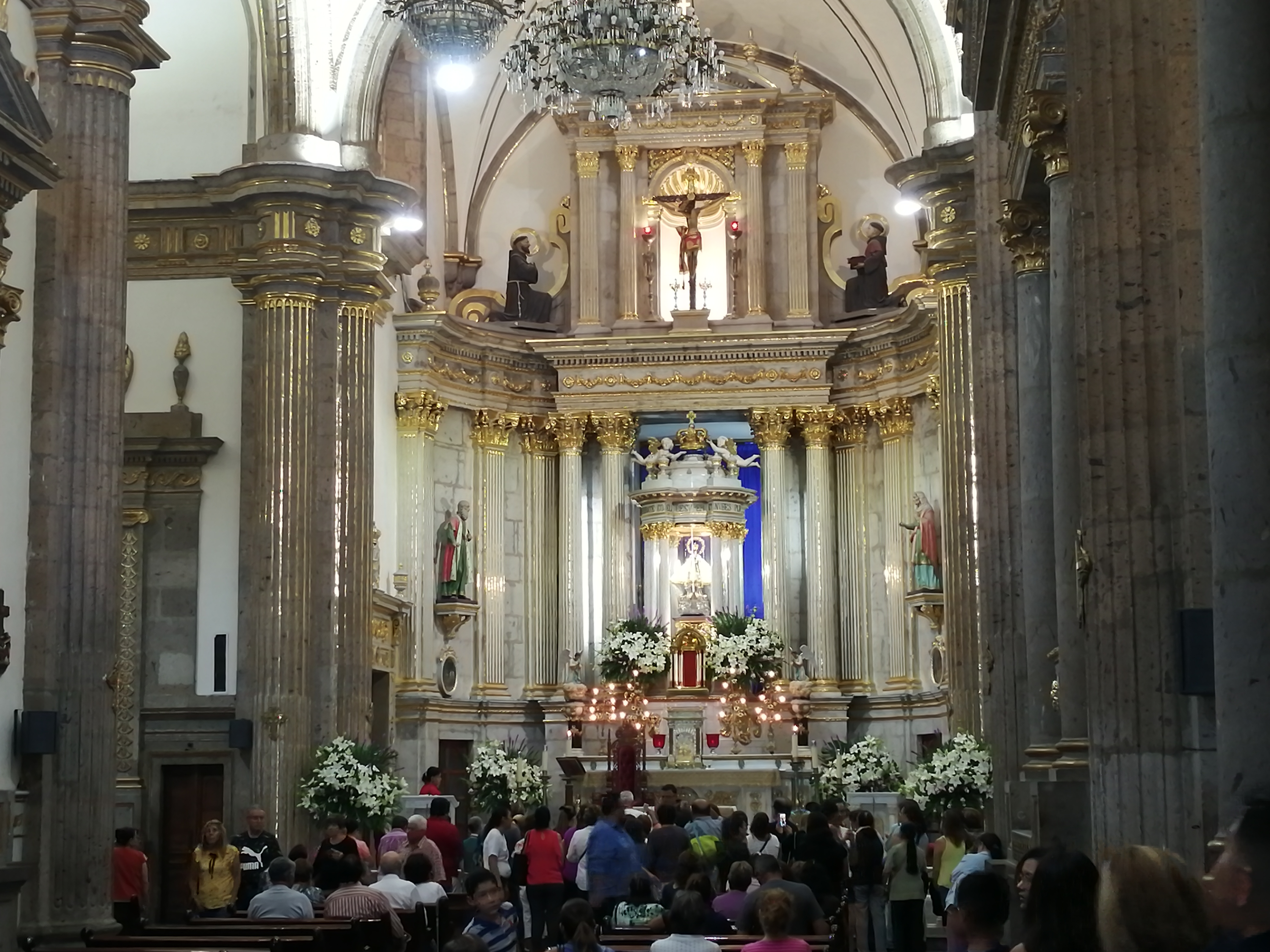
Basilica of Zapopan; the interior in 2019

The Virgin of Zapopan is also known as Our Lady of Expectation. She is also referred to as La Generala or the Zapopanita. In 1734, she was proclaimed Patroness against storms and lightning. The statue stays in Guadalajara from June 13 to October 12.

After Mexico became independent in 1821, the Virgin was proclaimed Patroness of the State of Jalisco. She was canonically crowned on 18 January 1921, in a ceremony that included presenting the keys to the city of Guadalajara.

=== Romería—pilgrimage ===
The Romería of the Virgin of Zapopan is an annual pilgrimage from the Guadalajara Cathedral to the Basilica of Zapopan.

It is considered the third most important pilgrimage in the country, after that of the Virgin of Guadalupe, and the Virgin of San Juan de los Lagos. The Romería of the Virgin of Zapopan consists of a route 8 km in length, from the metropolitan Guadalajara Cathedral, to the Basilica of Our Lady of Zapopan.

At dawn on October 12 of each year a procession of lay Catholics, pre-Columbian dancers, mendicants, priests and seminarians carries a statue of the Virgin Mary from the cathedral to the basilica. The figure of the virgin goes accompanied by more than 1,000,000 people. This festival involves most of the population of both cities and finishes with a mass in the plaza outside the basilica. The event ends with traditional dances and evening fireworks.

UNESCO inscribed Romería—pilgrimage in 2018 on the Representative List of the Intangible Cultural Heritage of Humanity.

== Basilica and abbey history ==
Different tribes of indigenous peoples populated the region of Tzapopan since around the 12th century CE. The Spanish conquistadors, led by Nuño Beltrán de Guzmán, conquered this area in 1530 for New Spain. Missionaries soon followed. In 1541, on direction of the king of Spain, the town of Nuestra Señora de la Concepción de Tzapopan (Our Lady of the Immaculate Conception of Tzapopan) was founded. Local legend tells that the Virgin interceded between the Spanish and the indigenous peoples during the conquest battles, convincing the local population to lay down their arms and convert to Christianity.

Major construction of the abbey and basilica began in 1689, although the original project underwent changes, additions, and conversions over time. The front of the church has a great vestibule, with Spanish Baroque portals that feature Ionic columns, sculptured reliefs, and large urns on pedestals.

The windows of the priest's rooms are on the side of the church. The main altar is made of Italian marble from Carrara. The pedestal for the statue of the Virgin was made of cypress by local artisans in the 17th century. The interior of the abbey has lodgings on the first and second floor and a chapel for the priests. There are also meditation gardens. The basilica serves as a seminary and a center of religious instruction for the Franciscans.

Local legend tells that the Virgin came to the assistance of the local populace fighting for independence from Spain in 1821. In 1979 the Pope John Paul II visited the church.

The basilica is a monumental example of 17th century colonial Baroque architecture, and is surrounded by other Spanish colonial architecture, such as the Chapel of Nextipac (Franciscan construction), the Chapel of Santa Ana Tepetitlán (a hospital founded by Franciscans). There are also later 17th century buildings such as the Neoclassical style Church of San Pedro Apóstol, Cruz Atrial de Tesistán, the Municipal Palace, and the Zapopan Entrance Arch.

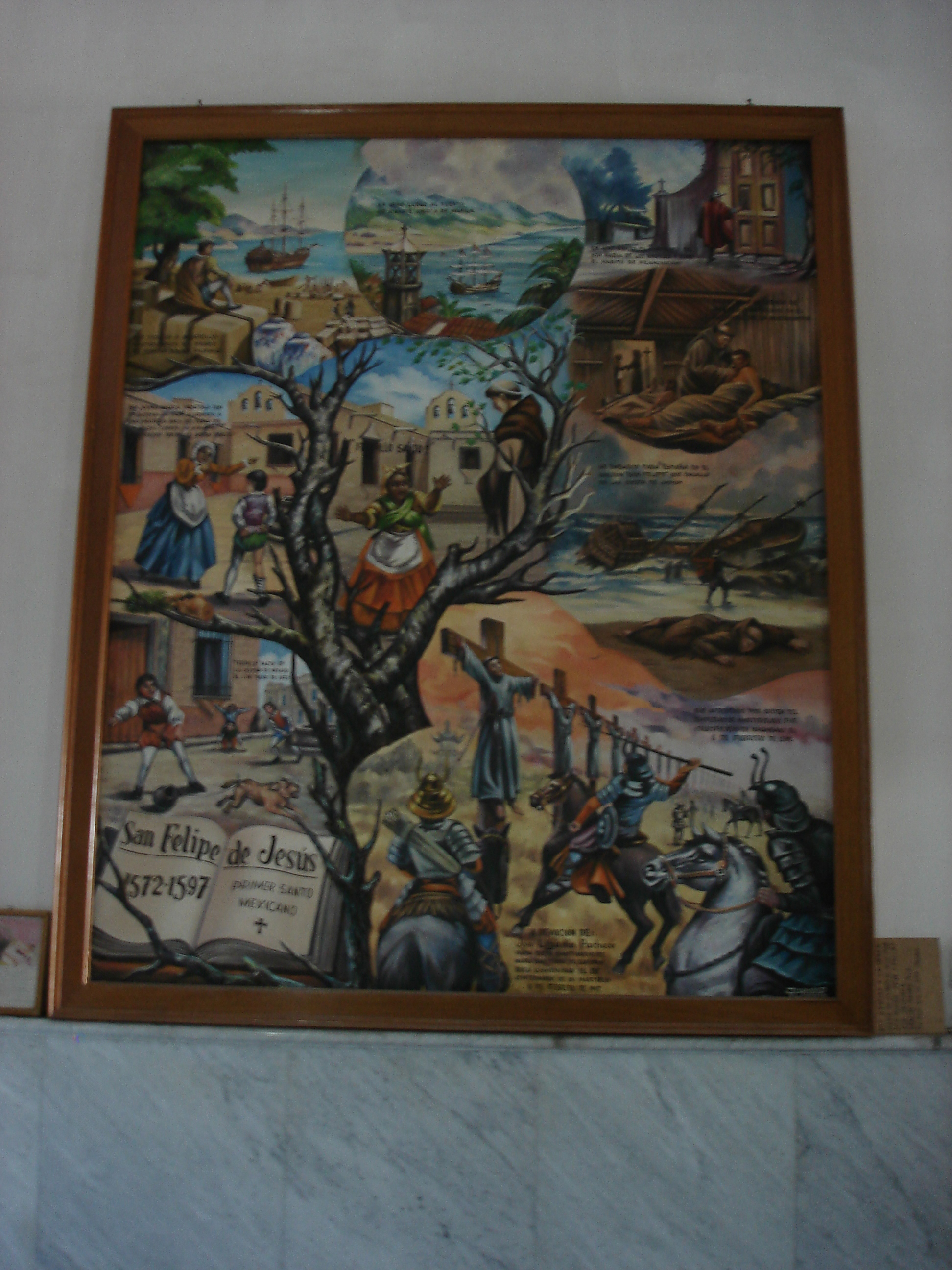
Painting of the life of San Felipe de Jesús in the church.

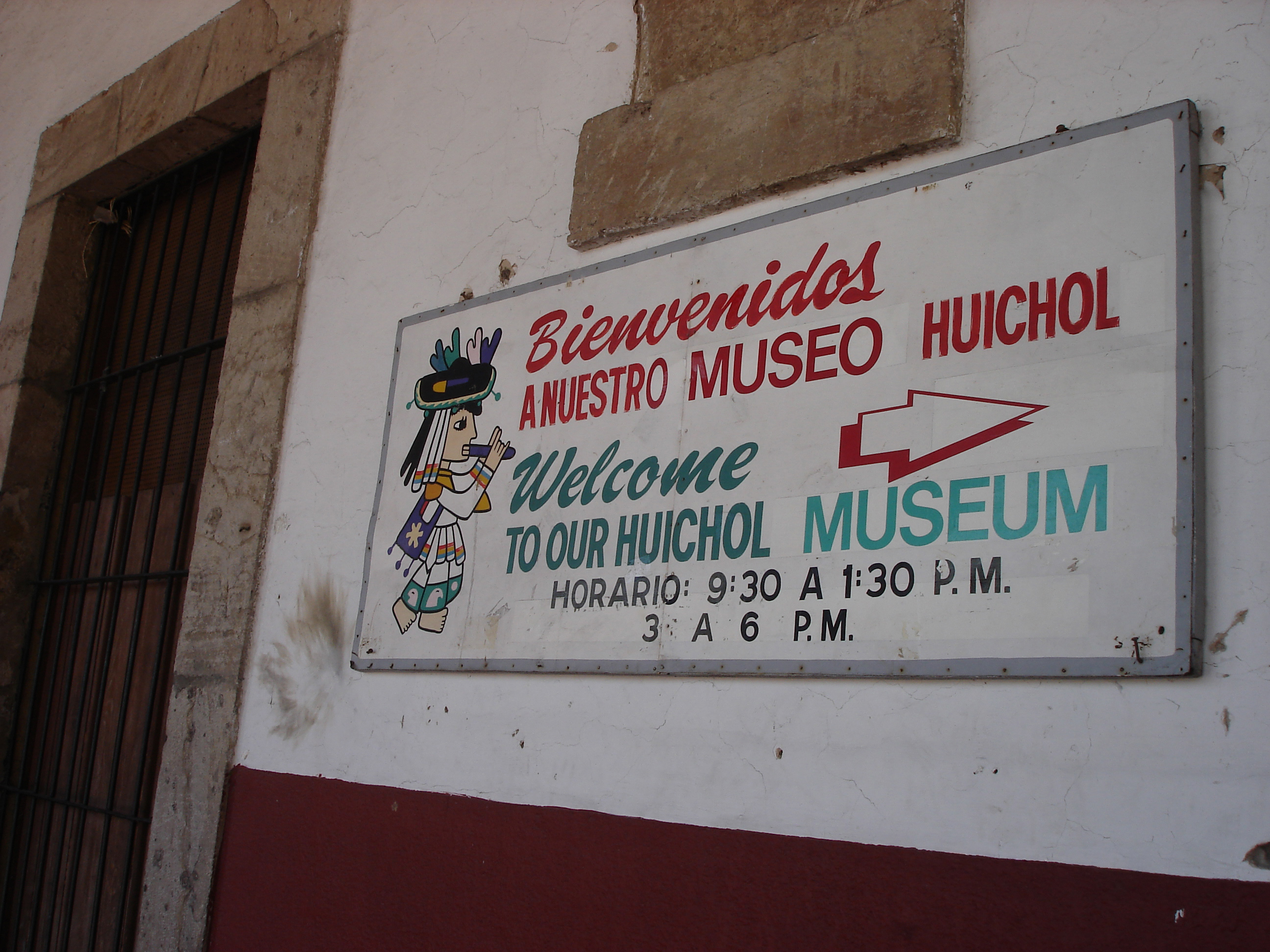
Entrance signs for the Huichol Museum.

=== Artworks ===
The church has a collection of art that includes paintings and sculptures.

- The oil painting of Juan Cruz Ruiz de Cabañas y Crespo, who was a patron of the church.
- The statue of the Virgin made by local artisans from Michoacán, at the request of Fr. Antonio de Segovia in 1541.
- The Holy Family – a work by Victoriano Acuña (1832)
- The church's atrium features two bronze statues, one of Fr. Antonio de Segovia and of Pope John Paul II.

The Huichol Museum is next to the basilica and has a permanent exhibit about the art of the Huichol, Tepehuan and Cora people. The Museum of the Virgin of Zapopan is on the north side of the basilica next to where the Virgin is venerated.

== See also ==
- Baroque architecture in Mexico
- List of basilicas
- List of Christian pilgrimage sites
