= Buendía, Cuenca =

Municipality of Spain

- Municipality
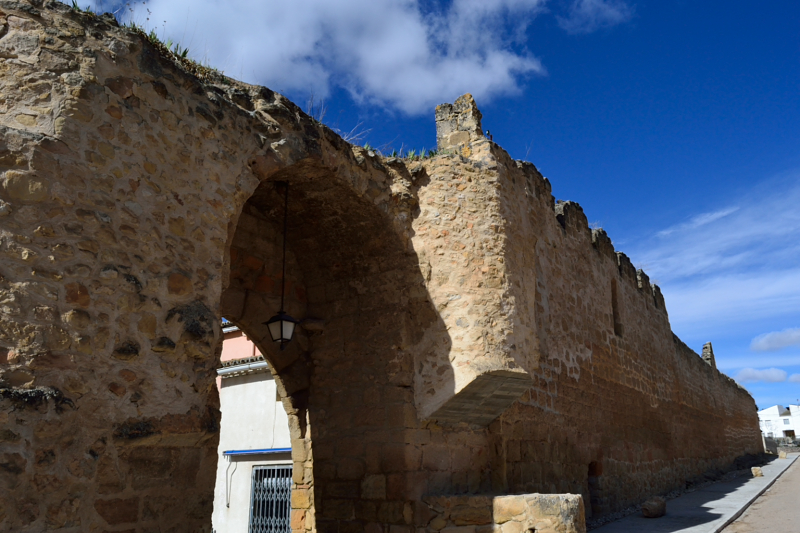

- Coat of arms

- Location within Spain Location within Castilla-La Mancha
- Coordinates: 40°22′N 2°45′W
- Country: Spain
- Autonomous community: Castile-La Mancha
- Province: Cuenca

Government
  - Mayor: Desamparados Sierra Santos

Area
  - Total: 88.5 km^{2} (34.2 sq mi)
- Elevation: 688 m (2,257 ft)

Population (2025-01-01)
  - Total: 422
  - Density: 4.77/km^{2} (12.3/sq mi)
- Time zone: UTC+1 (CET)
  - Summer (DST): UTC+2 (CEST)
- Postal code: 16512
- Website: Official website

Buendía (Spanish: [bwenˈdi.a]) is a municipality in Cuenca, Castile-La Mancha, Spain. It has a population of 505.
