= Susana Casillas =

- Born: Guadalajara, Mexico
- Known for: Painting, Fine arts, Portraiture
- Movement: Impressionism, Figurative art

Susana Casillas (born in Guadalajara, Jalisco) is a Mexican plastic artist internationally recognized for her portraiture artwork that displays influences of impressionism and figurative art. Her work has been displayed at numerous international art venues in Mexico, the United States, China, and France.

== Artistic development ==
Casillas started her career as a self-taught artist. Since her childhood she experimented with watercolors and acrylic painting, later she added oil painting as one of her preferred media. About the concept of her work she stated in an interview:

"In my work I try to communicate the idea of duality. I like painting faces. I sort of make two fusions of them in my portraits. They represent the mental or earthy realm, and the spiritual one, which I call 'instinct'. I think if people were able to listen to their instinct, there wouldn't be so much evil, there would be more love; it's something ever present within, like the soul and consciousness. It tells us what is good or wrong, it also tells us when we need to be alert. I've read a lot on these subjects, they have really defined me".

== Exhibitions ==
- Finalist and selected in the Eighth Art Show Grupo Reforma, included in the official catalog distributed in Guadalajara, Mexico City, Monterrey, and Paris, France.
- ArtFest 2016 in American School
- Galería LARVA (Laboratorio de Arte Variedades)
- PALCCO Museum, where she was introduced as an emergent artist with a valuable career path, since she has been involved in the art community, collaborating and working with established artists.
- She had the honor of intervening a guitar for the great musician VCarlos Santana, delivered in Las Vegas, Nevada.
- Exhibition in Guangzhou, China, Mansión ACA
- Exhibition en Shenzhen, China, Gallery Art Museum.
- She took part as a jury member in the painting category for the Jalisco Education Secretary two years in a row.
- Exhibition “Eye of the Beholder”, Arkansas, USA.
- Exhibition at Agave Rosa Gallery, El Paso, Texas, USA.
- Cover and content for PERSONAE magazine.
- Exhibition at Museo de Antropología e Historia (MAHO), Ocotlán, Jalisco (first woman in taking part in an exhibition).
- Mónica Saucedo Gallery, Colima.
- Exhibition ARTAMO GALLERY “Duality/Liberty”, Santa Barbara, California.
- Intervened “pakal” for Mayan Parade.
- Intervention for dress by Rosario Mendoza “TAKASAMI”
- Fine artist at SMI
- Projects and patronage from Tequila Patrón
- Selected among the “Hundred Woman in the Visual Arts from Mexico” to take part in this exhibition in the ceremony of International Women’s Day 2018
- Exhibition at Museo Regional Del Valle del Fuerte (Los Mochis, Sinaloa)
- “AMARTE”, project of inclusive art. CRIT, Teletón
- Exhibition at MUSA (Museo de las Artes de la Universidad de Guadalajara).

She’s currently working on her upcoming exhibitions for the year 2018: Los Angeles, Chicago, Santa Barbara (USA), Paris (France), Mexico City, León, Guadalajara, Baja California Sur, Los Mochis, Oaxaca (Mexico), and Norway.
