= Martín Casillas =

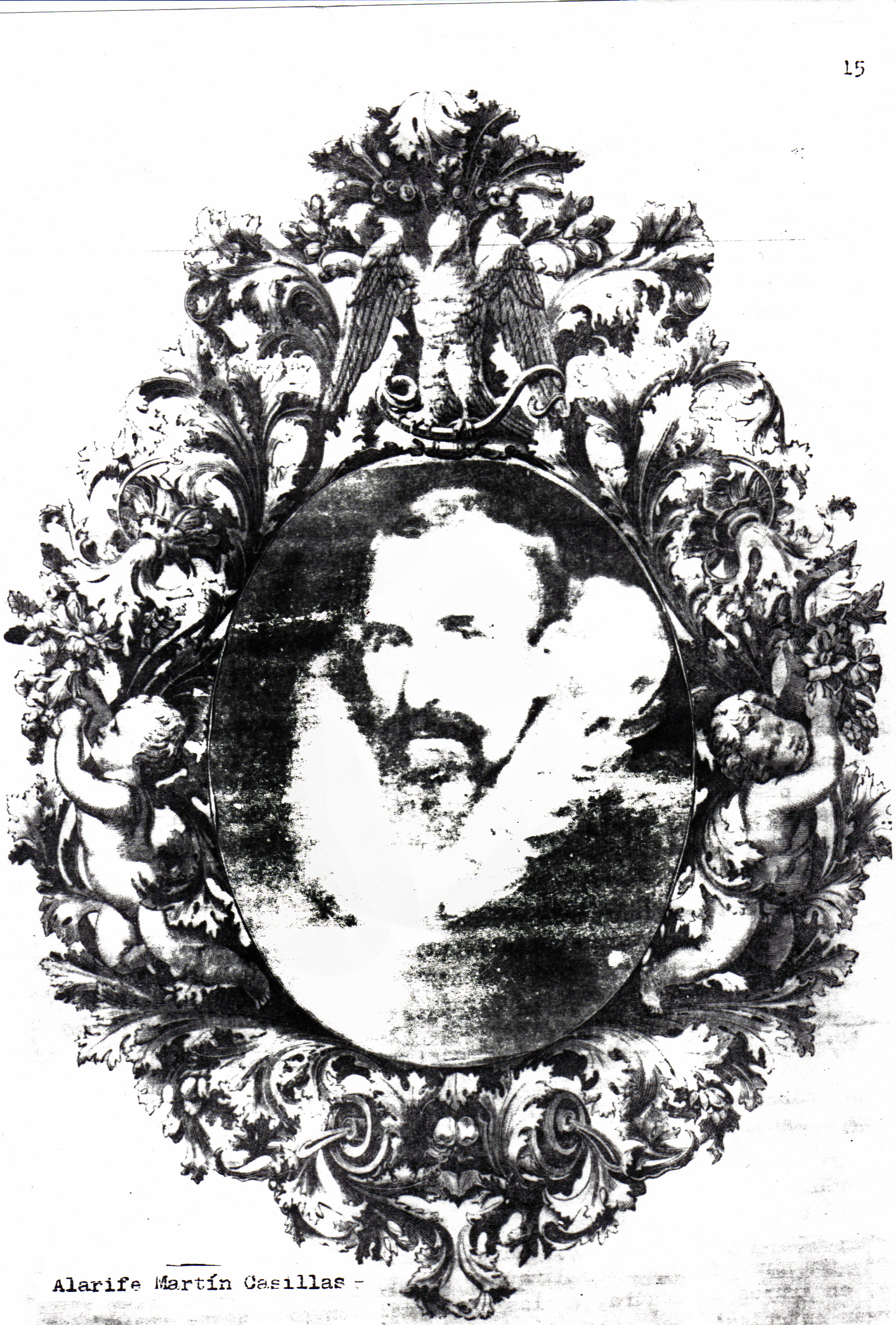

Martín Casillas (1556–1618) was a Spanish architect (″alarife″), best known for designing the Cathedral of Guadalajara in Jalisco, Mexico. His place of birth is disputed between the cities of Almendralejo and Trujillo in Extremadura. He trained with Francisco Becerra, with whom he would reach new Spain as an apprentice in 1573. Another option is that he arrived later along with Alonso Pablos (or Sánchez), another member of his workshop. He worked then and at least until 1585, in the «medias muestras» (mediums of the toral pillars) of the Cathedral of Mexico, the work directed by Claudio de Arciniega, moving then to the city of Guadalajara. There is documentation of his work in Jalisco, including the transfer of land in the Valle de Guadalupe, Jalisco.

The theatre "Alarife Martin Casillas" of Guadalajara was named in his memory.
