= Hugo Casillas =

Mexican footballer (born 1981)

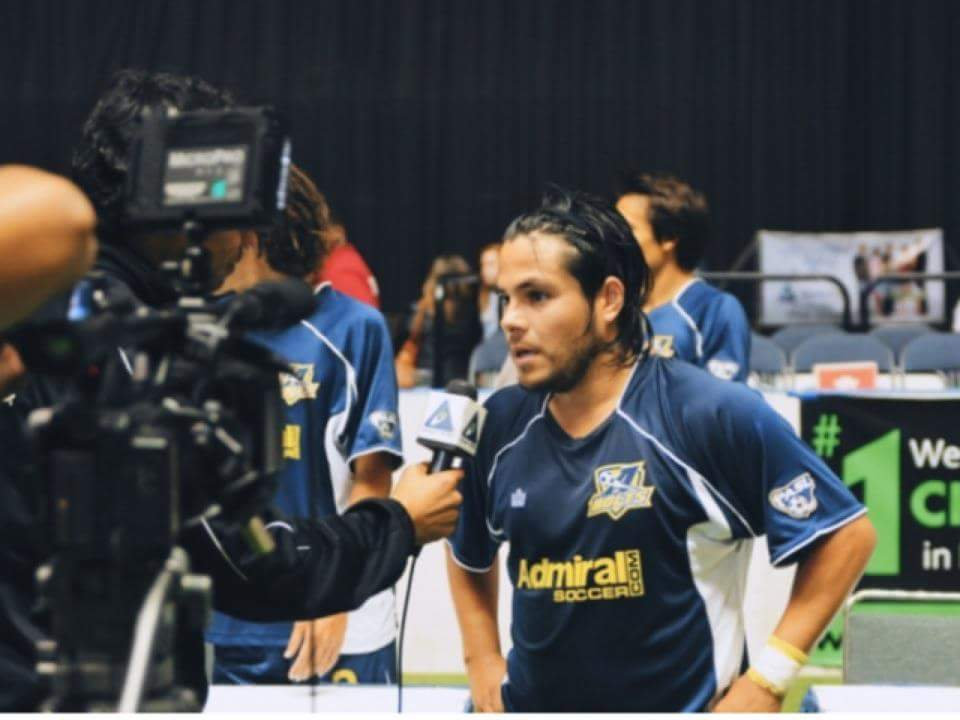

Personal information
- Full name: Hugo Noe Casillas Aldrete
- Date of birth: December 8, 1981 (age 44)
- Place of birth: Guadalajara, Mexico
- Height: 5 ft 6 in (1.68 m)
- Position: Defender

Team information
- Current team: Anaheim Bolts
- Number: 10

Youth career
- 2000–2005: Tecos UAG

Senior career*
| Years | Team | Apps | (Gls) |
| 2000–2006 | Tecos UAG | 89 | (33) |
| 2007 | California Victory | 24 | (8) |
| 2008–2010 | Murciélagos | | |
| 2010–2011 | UNAM Pumas | | |
| 2012– | Anaheim Bolts | 47 | (59) |
- * Club domestic league appearances and goals

Hugo Casillas (born December 8, 1981) is a Mexican footballer who currently plays defense for Anaheim Bolts of the Professional Arena Soccer League.
