= Casillas, Ávila =

Casillas
- municipality
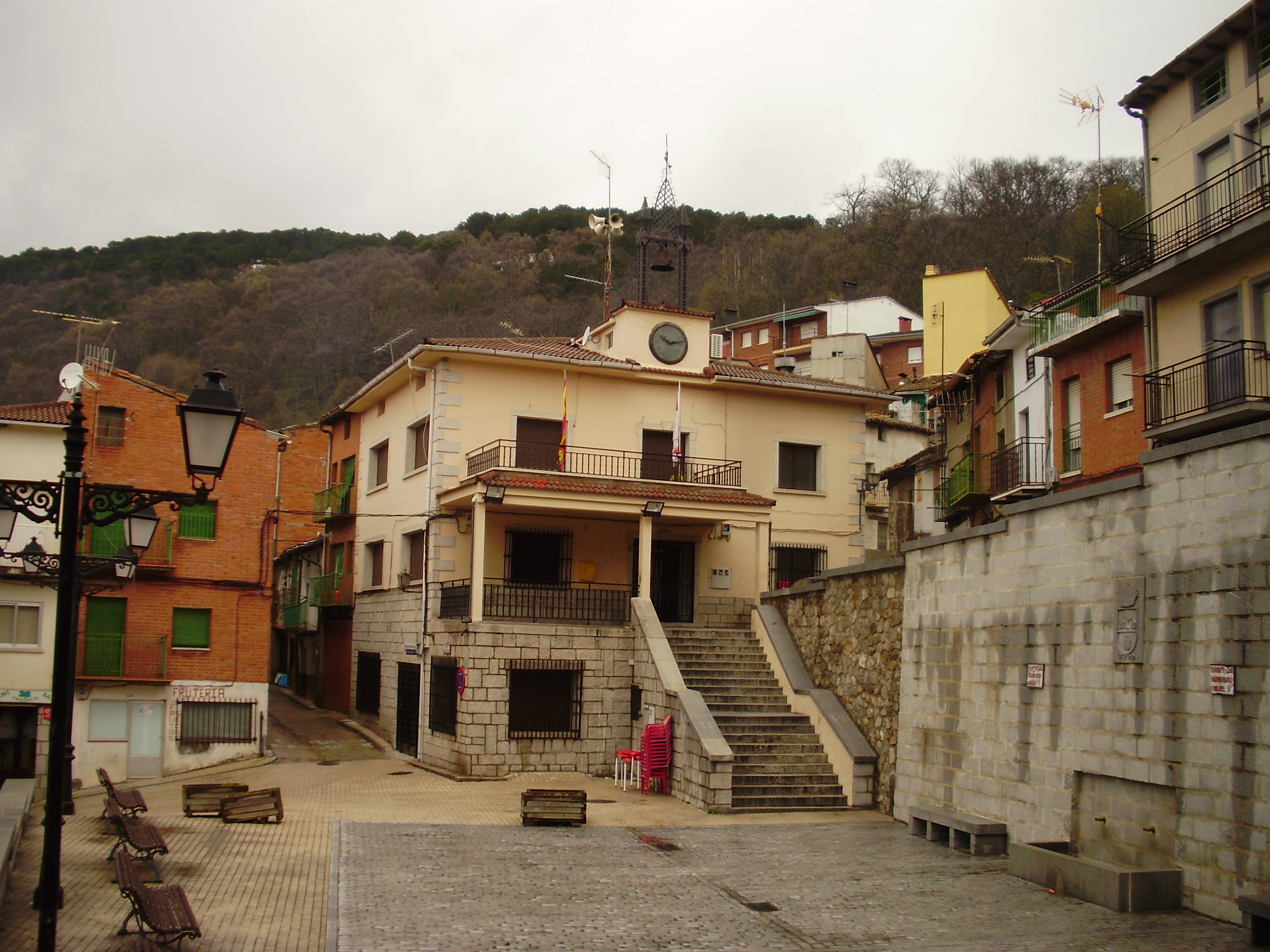
- City council of Casillas

- Flag Coat of arms

- Location in Spain. Casillas (Spain)
- Coordinates: 40°19′27″N 4°34′21″W
- Country: Spain
- Autonomous community: Castile and León
- Province: Ávila
- Municipality: Casillas

Area
  - Total: 11.96 km^{2} (4.62 sq mi)
- Elevation: 1.012 m (3.32 ft)

Population (2025-01-01)
  - Total: 673
  - Density: 56.3/km^{2} (146/sq mi)
- Time zone: UTC+1 (CET)
  - Summer (DST): UTC+2 (CEST)
- Website: Official website

Casillas is a municipality of Spain in Ávila, autonomous community Castile and León.

== Population ==
Historical population
Year	Pop.	±% p.a.
2023	663	—
2024	669	+0.90%
2025	673	+0.60%
Source: INE
