= Luis Casíllas =

Mexican modern pentathlete

Personal information
- Full name: Luis Casíllas Rodríguez
- Born: 7 June 1905
- Military career
- Branch: Mexican Army
- Rank: General

Sport
- Sport: Modern pentathlon

Luis Casíllas (born 7 June 1905, date of death unknown) was a Mexican modern pentathlete. He competed at the 1936 Summer Olympics. Casíllas later became a General in the Mexican Army, and was the commander of the Military Zone of Chiapas.
