= Andrés Casillas de Alba =

Mexican architect

- Born: 1934 (age 91–92); Mexico City
- Education: Escuela de Arquitectura de Guadalajara
- Occupation: Architect

Andrés Casillas de Alba (b. Mexico City, 1934) is a Mexican architect.

== Biography ==
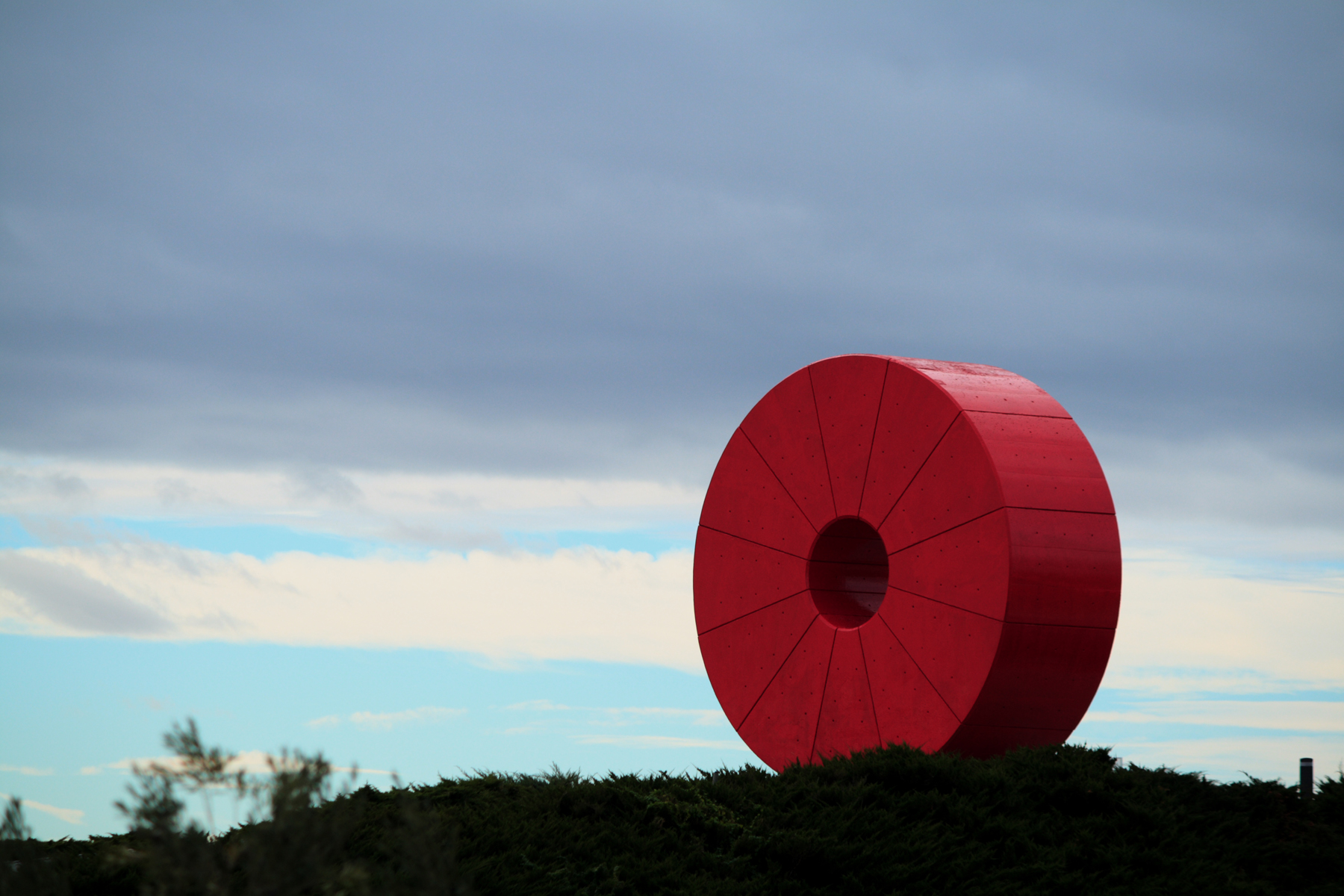
Espacio México (with Margarita Cornejo (1992). Parque Juan Carlos I, Madrid.

Casillas studied at the Escuela de Arquitectura de Guadalajara from 1952 to 1955, and at the Universidad Nacional Autónoma de México (UNAM) in Mexico City until 1956. From 1957 to 1961 he attended the Ulm School of Design, Germany, and participated meanwhile in urban planning projects for Isfahan in 1958, as well as he practiced in the architecture bureau Mangiarotti e Morassutti, Milan, in 1959. Back in Mexico, he worked together with Augusto H. Álvarez from 1962 to 1963, then together with Luis Barragán from 1964 to 1968, and after 1969 he was self-employed. His first building in Mexico was the Galería de Arte Mexicano, which he built during his cooperation with Álvarez. Casillas has been member of the Sistema Nacional de Creadores de Arte (SNCA) since 1994. He was multiple awarded, amongst others with the annual award of Jalisco's architects in 1994.

== Selected works ==
- "Andrés Casillas" house
- Club Náutico Los Amates, Cuernavaca
- McKinsey bureaus
- remodeling of the O'Gorman house
- "Yturbe" swimming pool, Acapulco (1968)
- mall, Plaza del Sol
- "Pedro Coronel" house, Distrito Federal de México (1970)
- Jardin Tapia, Guadalajara (1973)
- Centro Financiero Banamex, Guadalajara (1978)
- Jaiba project, Playa Jaibas, Jalisco (1980)
- "La Mancanilla", La Puenta, Manzanilla, Colima (1980)
- "García Villaseñor" house, Zapopan, Jalisco (1980)
- "Muñóz de Baena" house, Tecámac, Hidalgo (1995)
