= Marica Stražmešter =

Serbian swimmer

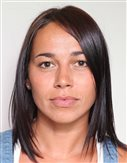

Personal information
- Nationality: Serbian
- Born: 28 August 1981 (age 44) Kikinda, SR Serbia, SFR Yugoslavia

Sport
- Sport: Swimming

Marica Stražmešter (Serbian Cyrillic: Марица Cтражмештер, born 28 August 1981) is a two-time Serbian Olympic swimmer. Stražmešter represented FR Yugoslavia at the 2000 Summer Olympics in 100 and 200m backstroke. She was 41th in 100 meters and 31st in 200 meters at the Olympics. Eight years later, she represented Serbia at the 2008 Summer Olympics in 100m backstroke, where she did not progress to the semifinals although she set a new national record. She is the Serbian record holder in 100m backstroke both in long and short course pools. She competed in the semifinals at European swimming championships, World championships.

Stražmešter became several times champion of Spain combining her swimming practices with her job as coach. She moved to the United States in 2014 and decided to work with youth in schools.

== See also ==
- List of Serbian records in swimming
