= Jesús Escandell =

Cuban dissident

Jesús Escandell Romero is a Cuban politician, president of the Cuban trade union "Central de Trabajadores de Cuba" (CTC) from 1985 to 1991.

In 1996 he was arrested, and spent nine months jailed without charge, at the Cuban political prison Villa Marista. Most observers believe that he was accused of espionage., in particular for his alleged role in leaking classified documents to foreign embassies, related to the 1996 purge against the Centre for American Studies (CEA).
