= Maryka =

Maryka is a given name. Notable people with the name include:

- Maryka Groenewald (fl. 2023), Australian politician
- Maryka Holtzhausen (born 1987), South African netball player

== See also ==
- Mary Kay
- Marika
- Mareka
