= Jesús Casillas Romero =

Mexican politician (born 1962)

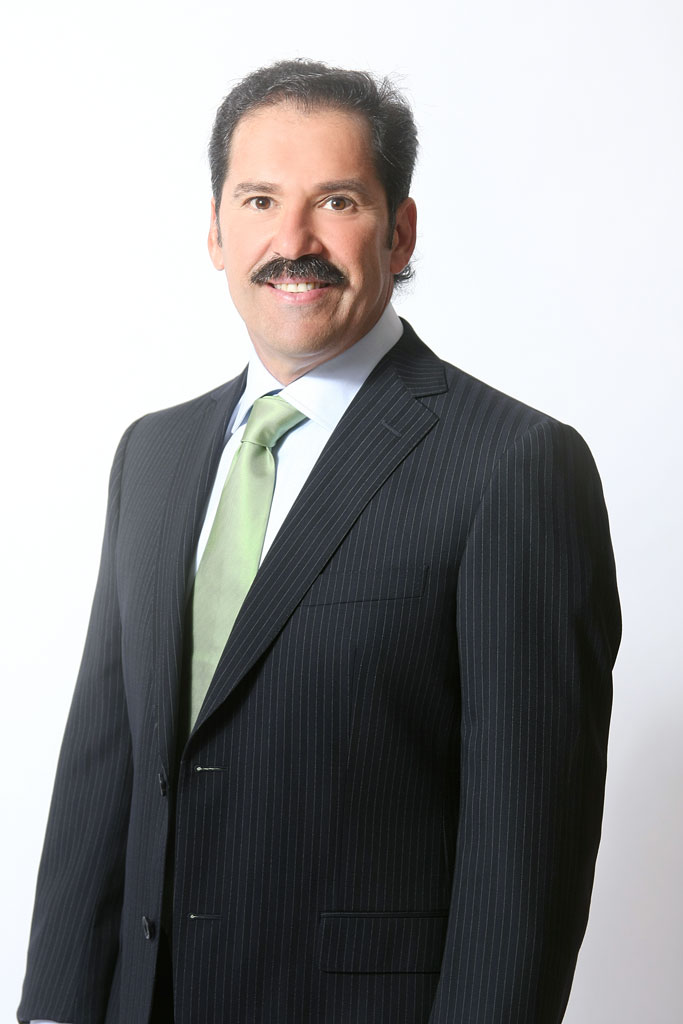
- Born: 13 May 1962 (age 64)
- Education: University of Guadalajara
- Occupation: Senator
- Political party: PRI

Jesús Casillas Romero (born 13 May 1962) is a Mexican politician affiliated with the PRI. He currently serves as Senator of the LXII Legislature of the Mexican Congress representing Jalisco, and previously served in the Congress of Jalisco.
