= Villa Marista =

DSE headquarters and prison in Havana, Cuba

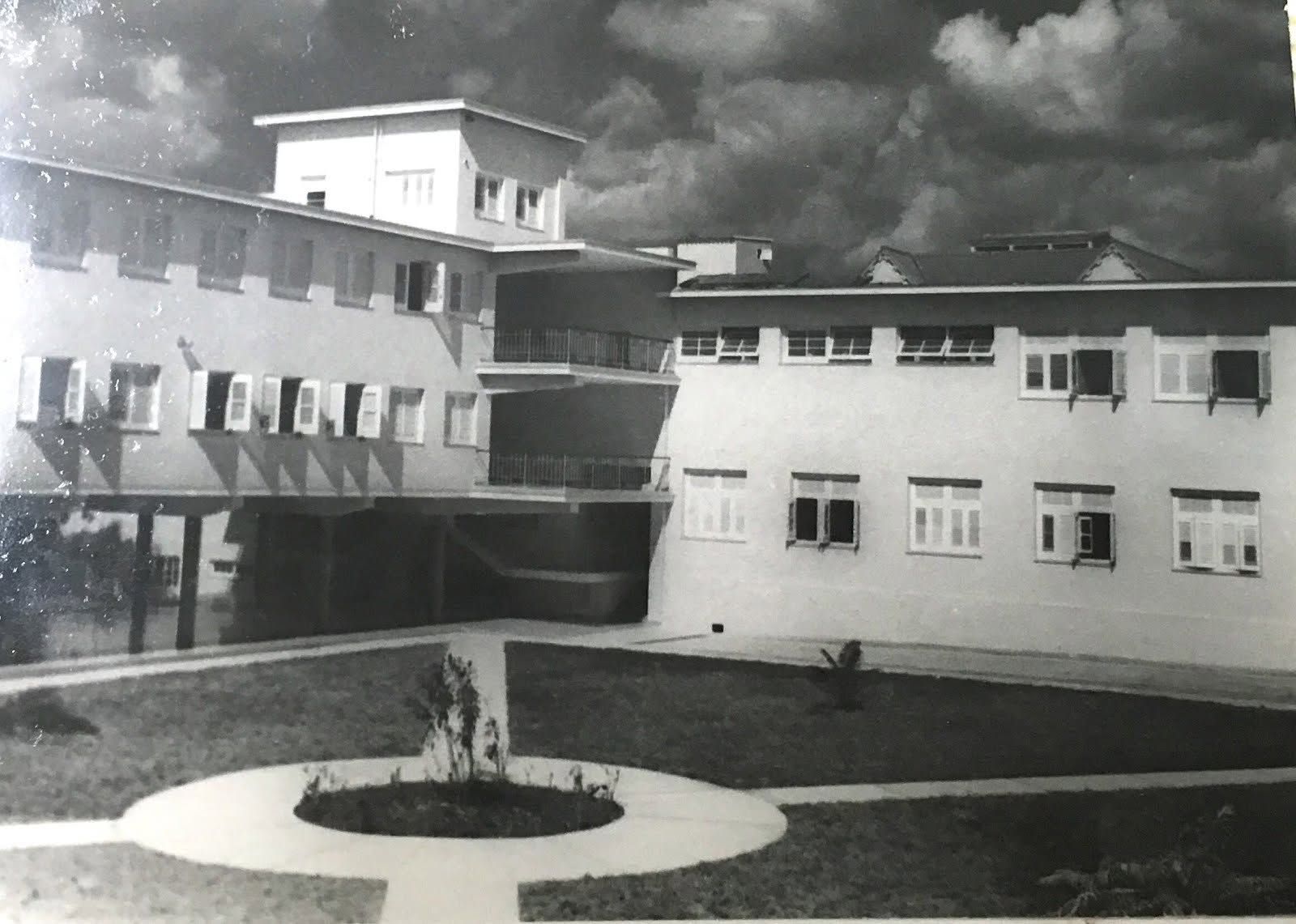
- Image of the Marist School during the 1950's

General information
- Coordinates: 23.084191°N 82.377406°E
- Owner: Cuban State Security Department; Ministry of the Interior

Villa Marista is the headquarters of the Cuban State Security Department (DSE), also known as the State Security Unit (Spanish: Departamento de Seguridad del Estado), of the Ministry of the Interior (MININT), in Havana, Cuba. There is also a prison onsite, notorious for its detention of political prisoners.

Its prisoners have included dissident Vladimiro Roca and politician Jesús Escandell. According to dissident journalist Abraham Jiménez Enoa, "Villa Marista generates more fear than anywhere else in the country. No one wants to go there or hear about it. Cubans say that, there, 'even mute people talk.' ”

== Villa Marista school ==
Villa Marista was originally a Catholic school for boys and a seminary for future Marist brothers. Prior to the Cuban Revolution, the school was run by the Marist Brothers. After the revolutionary government expropriated the school and grounds from the Marist Brothers, the brothers were spread to other Marist schools around the world, including Miami, Florida USA, Dominican Republic, and Puerto Rico.

The Marist Brothers, in addition to the three schools they had in Havana Cuba, also had presence in some other cities in the country like Cienfuegos, Cardenas, Remedio, Caibarien, Matanzas, Ciego de Avila, Santa Clara, Camaguey and Holguin.

== See also ==
- Military Counterintelligence Directorate
- Intelligence Directorate (Cuba)
