= Colegio Marista Guaynabo =

Catholic school in Guaynabo, Puerto Rico

Coordinates: 18.3811°N 66.1214°W

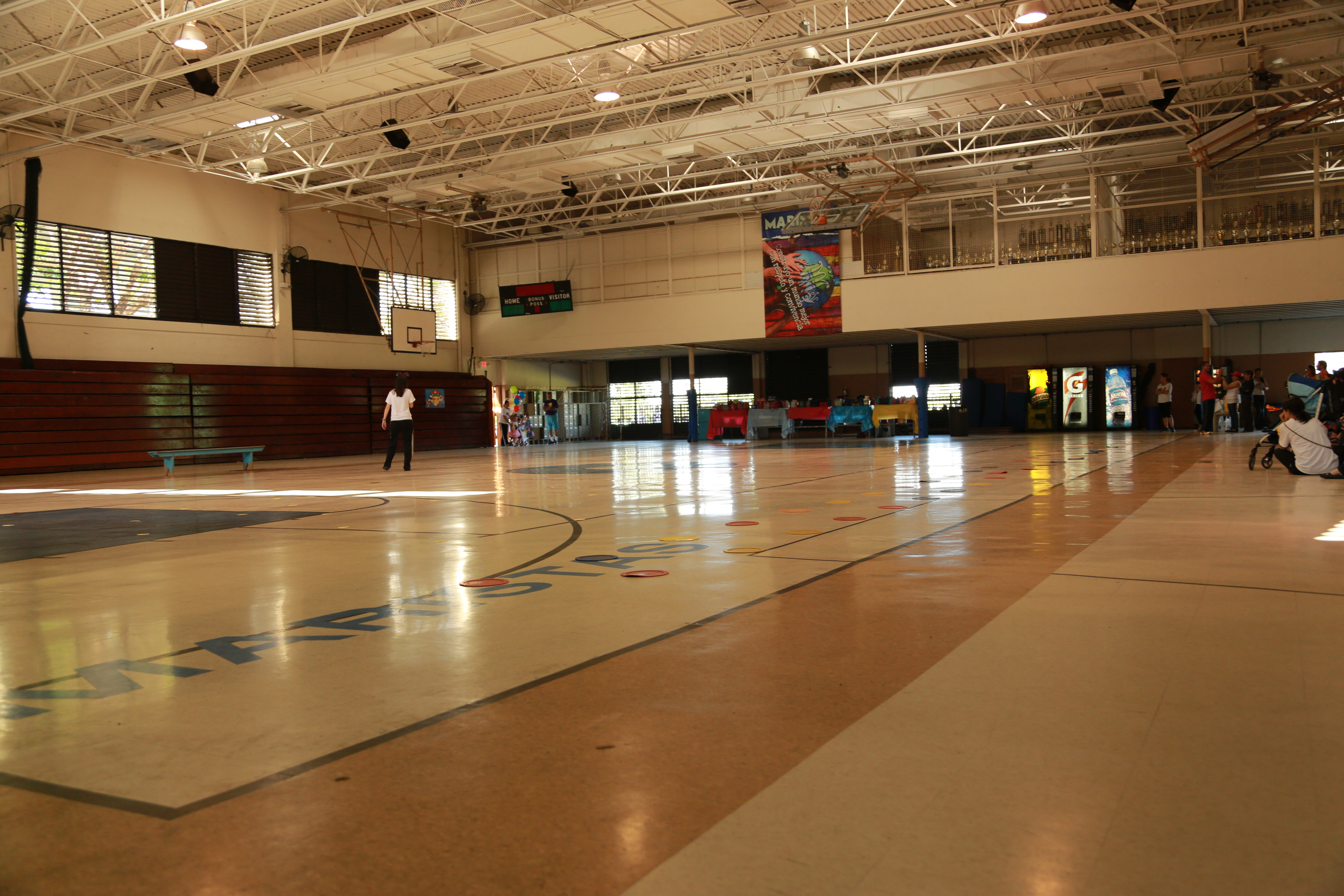
Court at Colegio Marista Guaynabo

Colegio Marista de Guaynabo is a private Roman Catholic high school in Puerto Rico conducted by the Marist Brothers. It the first Marist school at the island.

== History ==
In 1963, a group of families interested in having a catholic education for their boys, expressed their interest to the Archbishop of San Juan, Monsignor Jaime Dávila for the creation of the school. On September 2, 1963 Hno. David Mediavilla and Hno. Silvio Salicrup, delegates for the Order’s Superiors, arrived to evaluate the possibilities of making these families’ desires a reality. On November 11, 1963, the news of approval for the foundation of the school arrives. The school had its first settling in the residence of the Architect Jorge Ramírez de Arellano, in Calle J, Garden Hills. In August 1964, Colegio Marista started its educational history as boys only school, with 188 students for the first six grades. School population grew rapidly, accounting for 400 students in 1968. This growth seeded the construction of its new and actual facilities in Alturas de Torrimar, Guaynabo.

== Extracurricular activities ==
- Seahawks Chronicle (High School Publication)
- La Palestra (High School Publication)
- Il Giornalino (Middle School Publication)
- Miniaturas (Elementary School Publication)
- Consejo de Estudiantes (Student Council)
- National Jr. Honor Society / National Honor Society
- Club Modelo Naciones Unidas (Model United Nations)
- Coro de Niños
- Coro de Superior
- Pro-Arte (Art implementation club - includes dancing and music)
- Acuarela (Visual arts club)
- Teatro (Drama Club)
- Banda
- Forensics League
- Oratoria
- Club de Matemáticas (Mathematics Club)
- Club Del Lay-tee-go (Latigo)
- Club de Ciencias (Science Club)
- Science Bowl / Society of Hispanic Professional Engineers (SHPE)
- Biología Tropical (Tropical Biology)
- Ornitología (Ornithology Research Association)
- Tecnología (Technology)
- Conciencia Verde (Environmental Conscience)
- Club de Tierra Verde
- Club de Anuario (Yearbook)
- Círculo de Lectores (Reading Organization)
- Solidaridad (Solidarity Club)
- Orientación (College Orientation Club)
- Asistentes de Biblioteca (Library Assistants)
- Juventud Marista (Spirit Organization)
- Movimiento Infantil Amigos en Marcha
- Movimiento Infantil Maristas en Marcha
- Movimiento Juvenil Ciudad Nueva
- Movimiento Remar
- Spelling Bee

== Notable alumni ==
- Ricky Rosselló, former governor of Puerto Rico
- Luis Fortuño, former governor of Puerto Rico
- Pedro Pierluisi, former governor of Puerto Rico, former resident commissioner
- Luis G. Rivera Marín, former secretary of state of Puerto Rico
- Paul Bouche, Television Personality and Producer
- Luis D. Ortiz, Television Personality and Real Estate Agent
- Joanne Rodríguez Veve, current state senator
