= Maritza M. Buendía =

Mexican writer (born 1974)

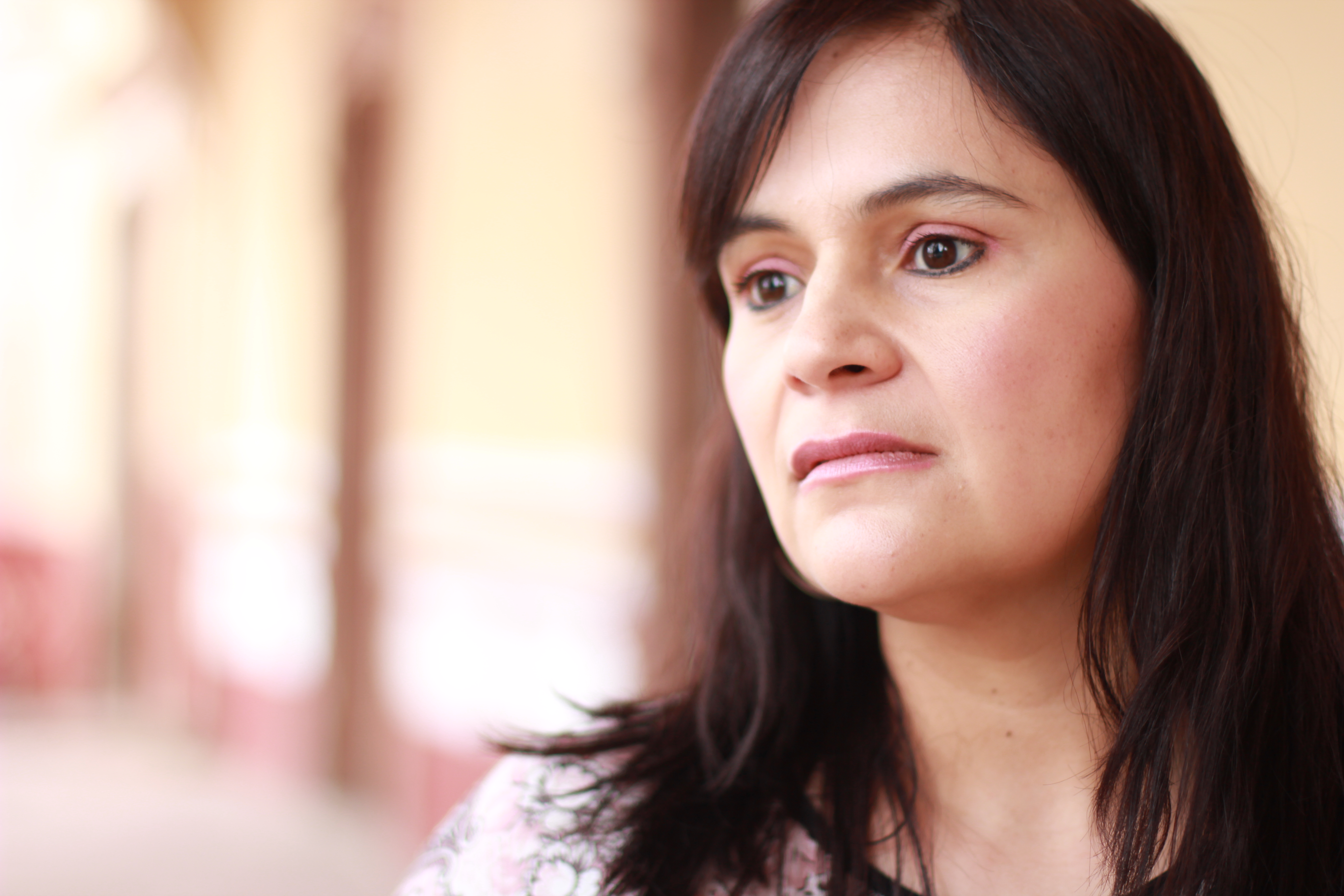
- Born: 1974 (age 51–52); Zacatecas (Mexico)
- Education: Autonomous University of Zacatecas; Metropolitan Autonomous University – Iztapalapa Unit
- Occupation: Writer
- Writing career
- Genres: Short fiction, essay, novel
- Notable works: La memoria del agua (2002); En el jardín de los cautivos (2005); Poética del voyeur, poética del amor: Juan García Ponce & Inés Arredondo (2013); Cielo Cruel (2023)

Maritza M. Buendía (Zacatecas, Mexico, 1974) is a Mexican writer, winner of the Gilberto Owen National Literature Prize (2012) and the José Revueltas Bellas Artes Prize for Literary Essay (2011).

== Biography ==
She earned a bachelor's degree in Literature from the Universidad Autónoma de Zacatecas (UAZ) [Autonomous University of Zacatecas], and later completed a master's in Philosophy and the History of Ideas at the same university. She pursued a PhD in Humanities-Literature at the Universidad Autónoma Metropolitana-Iztapalapa [Metropolitan Autonomous University – Iztapalapa Unit]. Her doctoral dissertation examines the poetic being, the sacred, love, and eroticism as new forms of expression based on the fiction of two writers from the Mid-Century Generation: Juan García Ponce and Inés Arredondo. This research earned the José Revueltas Bellas Artes Prize for Literary Essay in 2011 and gave rise to the book Poética del voyeur, poética del amor: Juan García Ponce e Inés Arredondo (2013). After finishing her dissertation, she completed a postdoctoral fellowship at the Universidad de Buenos Aires.

In 2003 she was part of the first cohort of the Fundación para las Letras Mexicanas (FLM), an institution in Mexico City whose aim is to foster the development of young writers. She has twice been a recipient of the FONCA Jóvenes Creadores (Young Creators) grant (2009 and 2007). In 2012 she undertook a residency at the Flemish PEN Club, House of Writers, in Antwerp, Belgium, through the Artistic Residencies Support Program (FONCA/CONACYT), an experience that enabled her to make her work known in other parts of the world.

She has contributed to the magazines Diálogo, Dosfilos, Oficio, and Tierra Adentro. She is a teacher-researcher at the Academic Unit of Letters of the Universidad Autónoma de Zacatecas (UAZ) [Autonomous University of Zacatecas] and was editor of the magazine Corre, Conejo. She currently collaborates with the Academic Body UAZ 170 on the electronic publication Cuadernos de Hermenéutica, which features part of her research in literature, hermeneutics, and humanities in general.

== Awards and publications ==
She is the author of the short-fiction book Tangos para Barbie y Ken (2016), a project that won the 2012 Gilberto Owen National Literature Prize. In 2015 she published Rumores, gatos y otros cuentos, an anthology of short stories that tells of the silence of a mother afflicted with melancholy; of Professor Julio; and of Alondra, who wishes to become a word so that she may be read by him.

In 2005 she published En el jardín de los cautivos, winner of the 2004 Julio Torri National Young Short Story Prize, a book in which "eroticism does not have a single face but many: it takes on pain, cruelty, mystery, and the crossroads of humiliation...".

In La memoria del agua (2002), the author offers stories that stand out for their atmospheric construction.

In 1998 she wrote Isla de sombras: una aproximación a la vida y obra de Roberto Cabral del Hoyo. In collective publications, Buendía appears in Emergencias. Cuentos mexicanos de jóvenes talentos (2004) and Ramón López Velarde: el inteligente ejercicio de la pasión (2001).

Committed to combining creative writing with research and teaching, she worked as editor on Cuadernos de hermenéutica I (2016) and Ficcionario de Teoría Literaria (2015). Some of her stories have been translated into French in the magazine Vericuetos and into Dutch in Deus ex machina.

In 2024, the novel Cielo cruel received the Bellas Artes Prize for Narrative ("Colima"); the National Institute of Fine Arts and Literature (INBAL) announced the decision on July 3, 2024, and presented the award on May 23, 2025.

== Works ==
=== Short fiction ===
- Tangos para Barbie y Ken, Textofilia Ediciones, 2016.
- Rumores, gatos y otros cuentos, El suri porfiado & Círculo de Poesía, Mexico/Argentina, 2015.
- En el jardín de los cautivos, Conaculta, Fondo Editorial Tierra Adentro, 2005.
- La memoria del agua, Conaculta, Fondo Editorial Tierra Adentro, 2002.

=== Essay ===
- Poética del voyeur, poética del amor: Juan García Ponce & Inés Arredondo, Conaculta/INBA/Instituto de Cultura del Estado de Durango, 2013.
- Isla de sombras: una aproximación a la vida y obra de Roberto Cabral del Hoyo, Gobierno del Estado de Zacatecas, LVI Legislatura del Estado de Zacatecas, 1998.

=== Anthologies ===
- Emergencias. Cuentos mexicanos de jóvenes talentos, Lectorum, 2004.
- Ramón López Velarde: el inteligente ejercicio de la pasión, Conaculta, Fondo Editorial Tierra Adentro, 2001.

=== Editor ===
- Cuadernos de Hermenéutica I, Policromía, 2016.
- Ficcionario de Teoría Literaria, Texere Editores, 2015.

=== Novel ===
- Jugaré contigo, Alfaguara, 2018.
- Cielo cruel, Alfaguara, 2023.

== Critical reception ==
National coverage of Cielo Cruel (interviews and press notes/reviews): The novel received wide coverage in the Mexican cultural press; critics underscored its exploration of female desire and its aesthetic proposal.

- La Jornada highlighted the erotic poetics and the "discovery of desire" as the novel's central thread. (July 26, 2023).
- Excélsior: interview on the "three ways of exploring desire" in Cielo cruel. (July 6, 2023).
- Milenio: interview for the book's launch. (2023).
- El Universal / Confabulario: review and mention of the 2024 Colima Prize associated with the work. (August 10, 2025).

== Bibliography ==
- Berenice Romano Hurtado, "El cuerpo bajo la mirada: violencia y erotismo en El jardín de los cautivos, de Maritza M. Buendía", Romance Notes, The University of North Carolina at Chapel Hill. Retrieved November 21, 2025.
- Elsa Leticia García Arguelles, "Maritza M. Buendía: un mar de relatos o los sueños del cuerpo", FILHA, Universidad Autónoma de Zacatecas. Retrieved March 9, 2016.
- Yamilet Fajardo, "Formas de leer el mundo en Poética del voyeur, poética del amor, de Maritza. M. Buendía", Casa del tiempo, UAM. Retrieved March 9, 2016.
- Fernando Murillo, "Erotismo: más allá de la vida y de la muerte. Maritza M. Buendía", La otra. Revista de poesía, artes visuales, otras letras, México. Retrieved March 9, 2016.
- Celeste Rivas, "Sobre En el jardín de los cautivos de Maritza M. Buendía", Círculo de poesía. Revista electrónica de literatura. Retrieved March 9, 2016.
- Natu Poblet, "Leer es un placer" (radio interview), Buenos Aires. Retrieved March 9, 2016.
- Yanireth Israde, "Indaga el erotismo femenino, Reforma. Retrieved February 15, 2017.
- Juan Arturo Martinez, "¿Bailamos?", Liebre de fuego. Retrieved November 23, 2025.
