= Colégio Marista Dom Silvério =

Coordinates: 19.9426°S 43.9347°W

- Belo Horizonte; Brazil

Information
- Type: Preschool; Elementary School; High School
- Established: 1950
- Principal: Vanderlei Soela
- Staff: 35
- Enrollment: 3000
- Colors: Blue, grey and white
- Affiliation: Marist Order (Brothers)
- Website: Official website

Colégio Marista Dom Silvério (CMDS) is a private Marist school located on the southern region of Belo Horizonte, in Brazil. Its courses go from pre-school to high school, which in the Brazilian educational system is usually identified with ages from 4 to 17.

CMDS was founded in 1950, and hosts more than 3,000 students. Part of the school's finances were used for the seven-year-long construction of Marista Hall.

The school is named after Dom Silvério Gomes Pimenta, a Catholic priest of the early twentieth century who was a member of the Academia Brasileira de Letras, the Brazilian Academy of Literature.

The current principal of CMDS is Professor Edison de Souza Leite.

== See also ==
- Marista Hall
