= Arena Hall (Belo Horizonte) =

Event center in Belo Horizonte, Brazil

Coordinates: 19.942082°S 43.934192°W

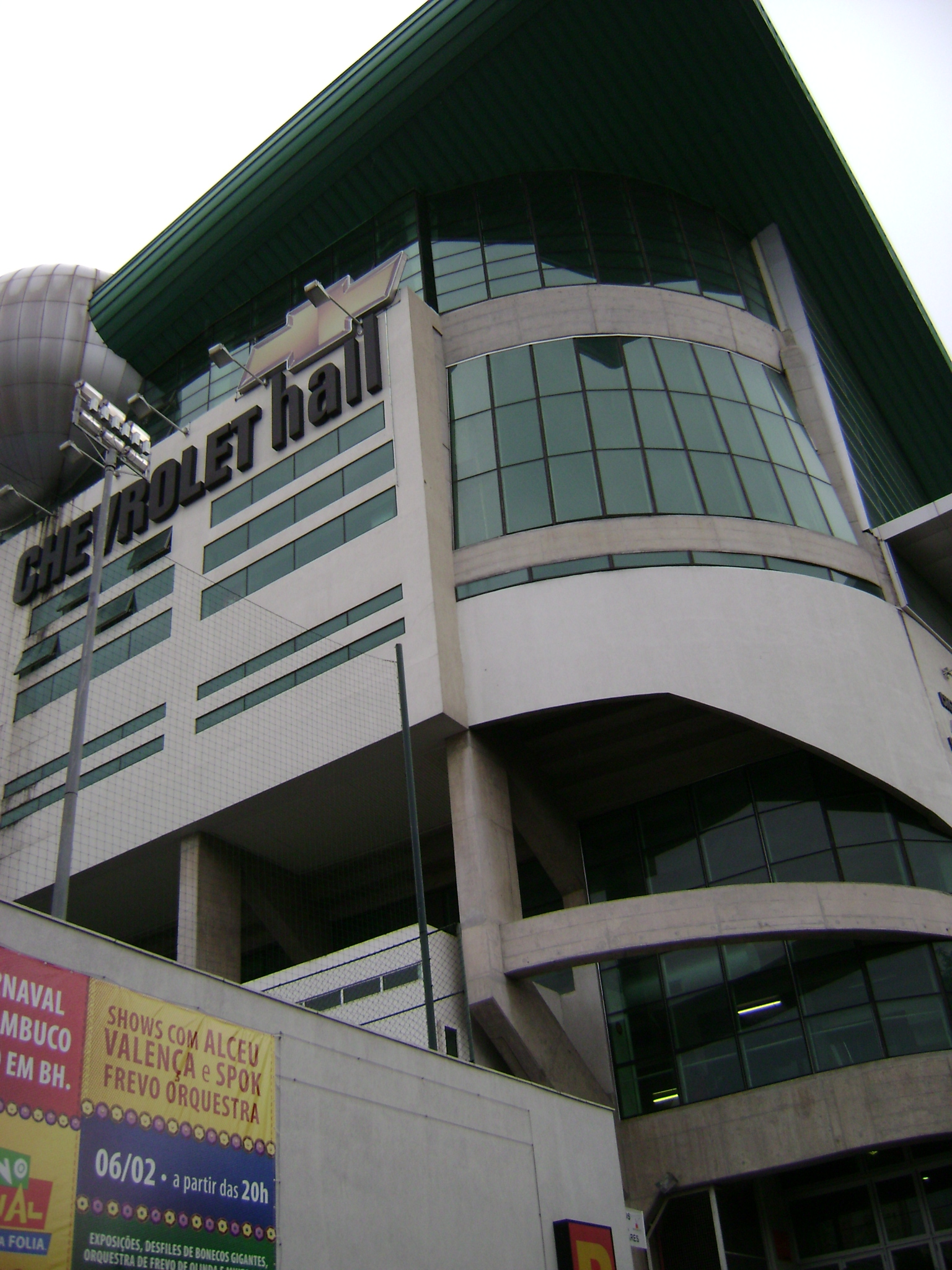
- Interactive map of Arena Hall
- Former names: Marista Hall (2003-05); Chevrolet Hall (2005-16); BH Hall (2016-17); KM de Vantagens Hall (2018-23)
- Address: Avenida Nossa Senhora do Carmo, 230; Belo Horizonte - MG; 30330-000; Brazil
- Location: Colégio Marista Dom Silvério, Savassi
- Owner: União Brasileira de Educação e Ensino
- Operator: Time For Fun
- Capacity: 5,500 (Arena); 500 (Espaço Multiuso); 400 (Teatro Dom Silvério)

Construction
- Groundbreaking: 17 March 1997
- Opened: 25 June 2003

Website
- arenahall.com.br

Arena Hall (originally known as the Marista Hall) is an events centre in Belo Horizonte, Brazil, located on the campus of the Colégio Marista Dom Silvério. The goal was to create an environment with a great diversity of spaces. It includes a multipurpose room, a theater, an arena, courts, and a parking lot; this structure is suitable for a wide variety of cultural, artistic, and sports events, be it of a technical, commercial or recreational nature.

== About the centre ==
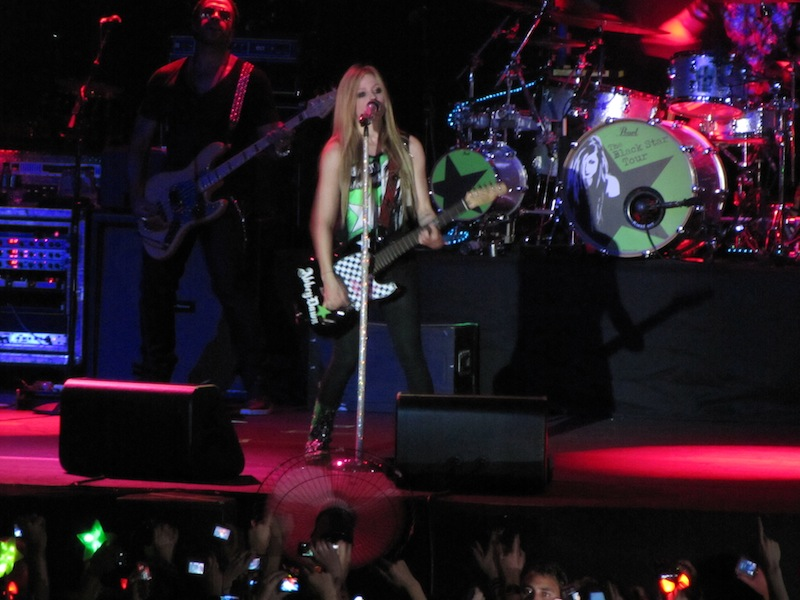
Canadian singer, Avril Lavigne, performing at Arena Chevrolet Hall in 2011

Construction began in March 1997, and the original deadline was December 1998. However, this deadline was progressively postponed, and the building did not open until June 25, 2003.

Since a good part of the construction was financed by students of the Colégio Marista Dom Silvério, Marista Hall is a target of jokes and dissatisfaction, because thousands of students paid for it but never benefited from it, having left school before construction was completed. Further dissatisfaction came when Chevrolet began to sponsor the centre in 2005; as a result the place changed its name to "Chevrolet Hall". There is a community in orkut dedicated to "refusing" the new name, mostly former and current students of college who feel their contributions to the site should be recognized in its name. In 2016, GM chose not to renew the contract for naming rights and the venue became known as the "BH Hall" until March 2017, when fuel company Ipiranga secured the naming rights. Beginning 19 March 2017, the centre is known as the "KM de Vantagens Hall". It is considered the biggest house of shows of BH.

== Noted performers ==
- A-ha
- Akon
- Alanis Morissette
- All Time Low
- Angra
- Avril Lavigne
- Backstreet Boys
- Bob Dylan
- Chris Brown
- Colbie Cailat
- The Cranberries
- Deep Purple
- Demi Lovato
- Dream Theater
- Exodus
- Faith No More
- Fifth Harmony
- Hanson
- Incubus
- Imagine Dragons
- Interpol
- James Blunt
- Jason Mraz
- Jethro Tull
- Jonas Brothers
- Joss Stone
- Judas Priest
- Keane
- Kreator
- Lana Del Rey
- Lauryn Hill
- McFly
- Megadeth
- Motion City Soundtrack
- Nightwish
- Norah Jones
- Now United
- The Offspring
- P.O.D.
- Paramore
- Pet Shop Boys
- Queensrÿche
- Ringo Starr & His All-Starr Band
- Roxette
- Scorpions
- Seal
- Sepultura
- Shaman
- Simple Plan
- Slayer
- Snow Patrol
- Steve Vai
- Stratovarius
- Whitesnake
