= Webster Marble =

20th-century outdoorsman and inventor

Webster L. Marble
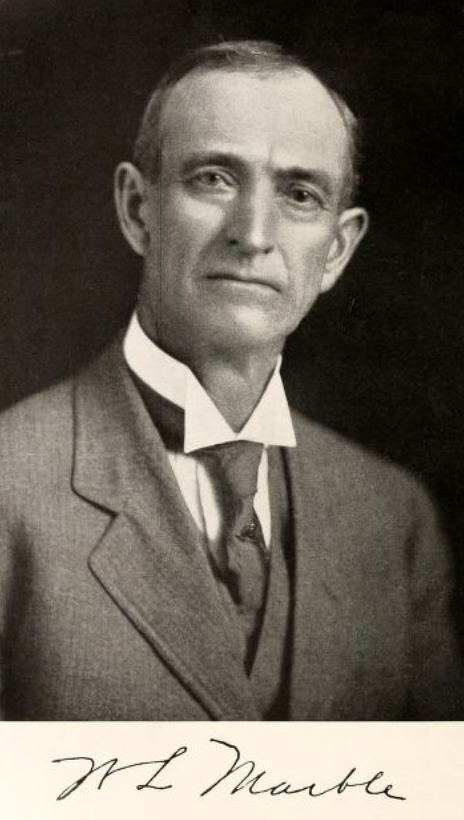
- Born: April 23, 1854; Milwaukee, Wisconsin, US
- Died: September 22, 1930 (aged 76); Gladstone, Michigan, US
- Burial place: Fernwood Cemetery; 45.8425°N 87.0503°W
- Occupation(s): Inventor and outdoorsman
- Years active: 1889–1930
- Organization(s): Gladstone School Board, Gladstone Freemasons
- Known for: Marble Arms
- Height: 5'2
- Spouse: Rosa M. Derry (1878–1924) Eunice Derry (1924)
- Children: 2

Webster L. Marble (1854–1930) was an inventor, early outdoorsman, and prolific patent-holder who spent the majority of his life in Michigan's Upper Peninsula. His manufacturing company, now known as simply as Marble Arms, has operated in the town of Gladstone, Michigan since 1898.

== Biography ==
=== Early life ===
Webster Lansing Marble was born on March 23, 1854, in Milwaukee, Wisconsin, the third of six children born to Mary Chipman Marble and her husband Lansing Marble, a trapper and basketmaker. The family moved to Vassar, Michigan in 1858, where they would live until Webster was 15. He spent the majority of his childhood outdoors: hunting, fishing, and trapping alongside his siblings. Webster's family moved again in 1868, this time to Frankfort, Michigan, where his parents would remain for the rest of their lives. His father, Lansing Marble, operated a bushel basket-making business that used proprietary machines to increase stave basket-making capacity from one-a-day to over one hundred. He owned a basket factory back in Milwaukee from 1863 until 1867, when he sold the business to devote more time to the outdoor interests he shared with his son. It has been said that his both his father's entrepreneurial spirit and his passion for the outdoors likely heavily influenced Webster.

=== Timber cruiser ===
For two decades, Webster Marble worked as a timber cruiser and surveyor throughout Northern Michigan's white pine forests. Timber cruisers played a vital role in the logging industry, traveling ahead alone to hike into the forests, take measurements, and report data back to the lumber companies for months at a time. During his time as a cruiser the Upper Peninsula was largely unsettled, viewed primarily as a deposit of resources like copper, iron, and lumber rather than a residential location. Demand for wood in the area had skyrocketed following the Great Chicago Fire of 1871, providing Webster with more than enough work for many years.

Marble was widely admired amongst his fellow cruisers for his uncanny ability to calculate the amount of useable lumber produced from a given acreage of forest just by looking at it. Not known for being a large man, Webster had to carry more than 50 pounds of heavy cruising and surveying equipment through the woods every day, including a large, razor-sharp hatchet. When his fellow surveyors settled down at the fire after a long day's work, Webster was known for pulling out his sketchbook and working on ideas for new tools that could improve work in the woods. Memories of this time did not escape him in his later years, as he would eventually invent numerous products that made his previous career significantly easier for those now employed in the timber industry.

Webster married Rosa M. Derry, a former resident of New York, in Frankfort, Michigan in 1878. The pair would have two sons, William Lansing (1880–1977) and Floyd Webster (1891–1937).

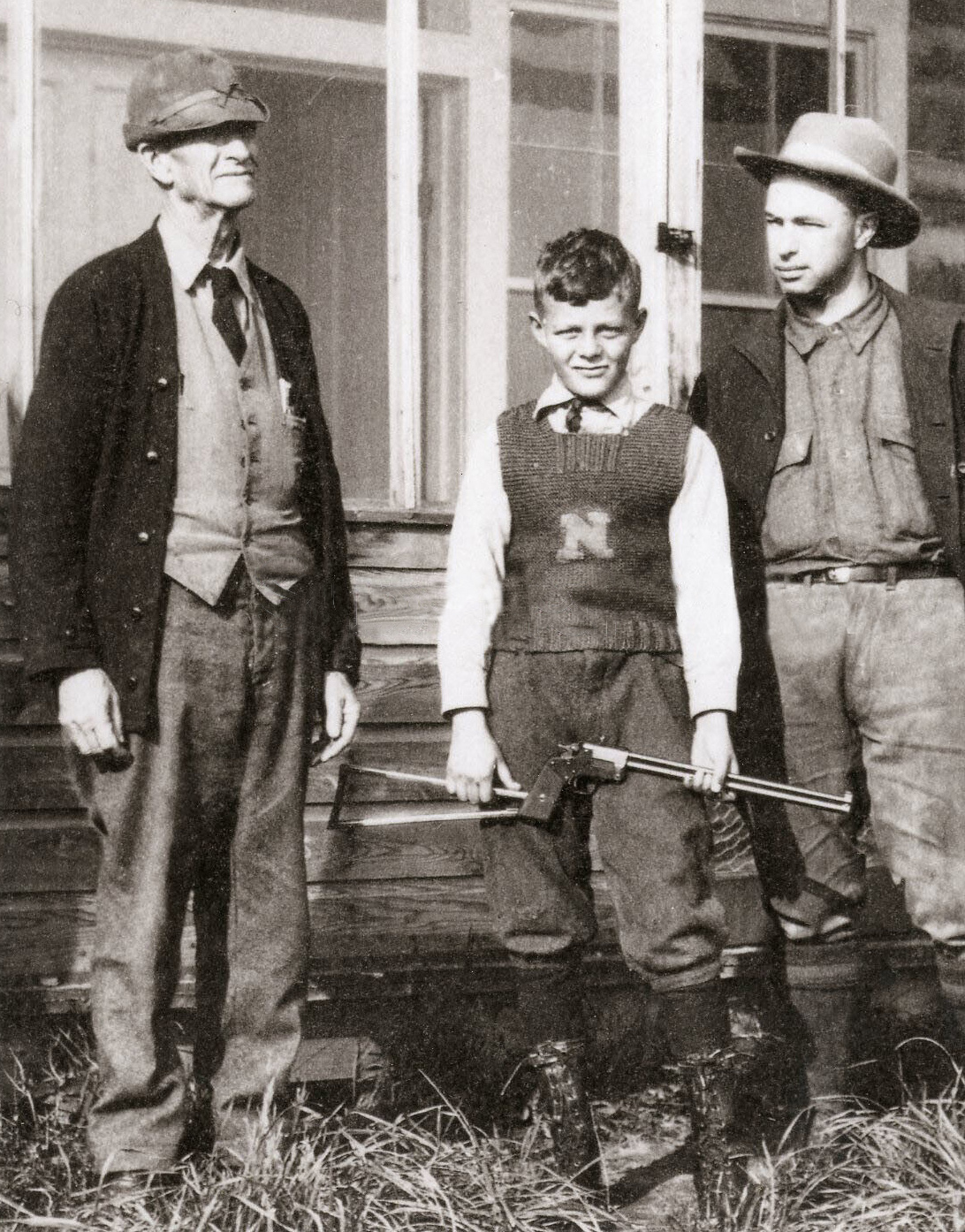
Webster Marble (left), young man holding Marble Game Getter, Floyd Marble (right), c. 1921.

=== Gladstone ===
Webster Marble moved to Gladstone, Michigan with his wife and young son William right when the town was forming in 1887, after learning about the area's industrial and natural potential. Noting the Soo Line Railroad and nearby Little Bay de Noc, Marble decided to join several other industrial businesses in staking a claim in the town. In 1889, his then-86-year-old father died in his home while on a visit from Frankfort. The following year Webster founded the Gladstone Exchange Bank and served as its president for the next four decades. Webster began manufacturing gunsights in his small garage workshop at approximately the same time, patenting his first invention in 1891. Webster and Rosa's second son, Floyd, was born in Gladstone the same year.

Webster became heavily involved in the local Gladstone community as it began to form, joining both the local Republican Party and the Gladstone branch of the Freemasons, and winning a seat on the Gladstone School board. He also became heavily involved in the local Episcopal church, serving on the church board for many years as a treasurer and trustee. Marble's wife Rosa died in 1923, and he married her younger sister Eunice Derry a year later in 1924.

Webster L. Marble died on September 22, 1930, and was buried on the Protestant side of Fernwood Cemetery, one of the Gladstone's earliest cemeteries.

Upon his death, control of Marble Arms went to his son William Marble, while his second son Floyd Marble inherited the Gladstone Exchange Bank.

== Marble Arms and Manufacturing Co. ==
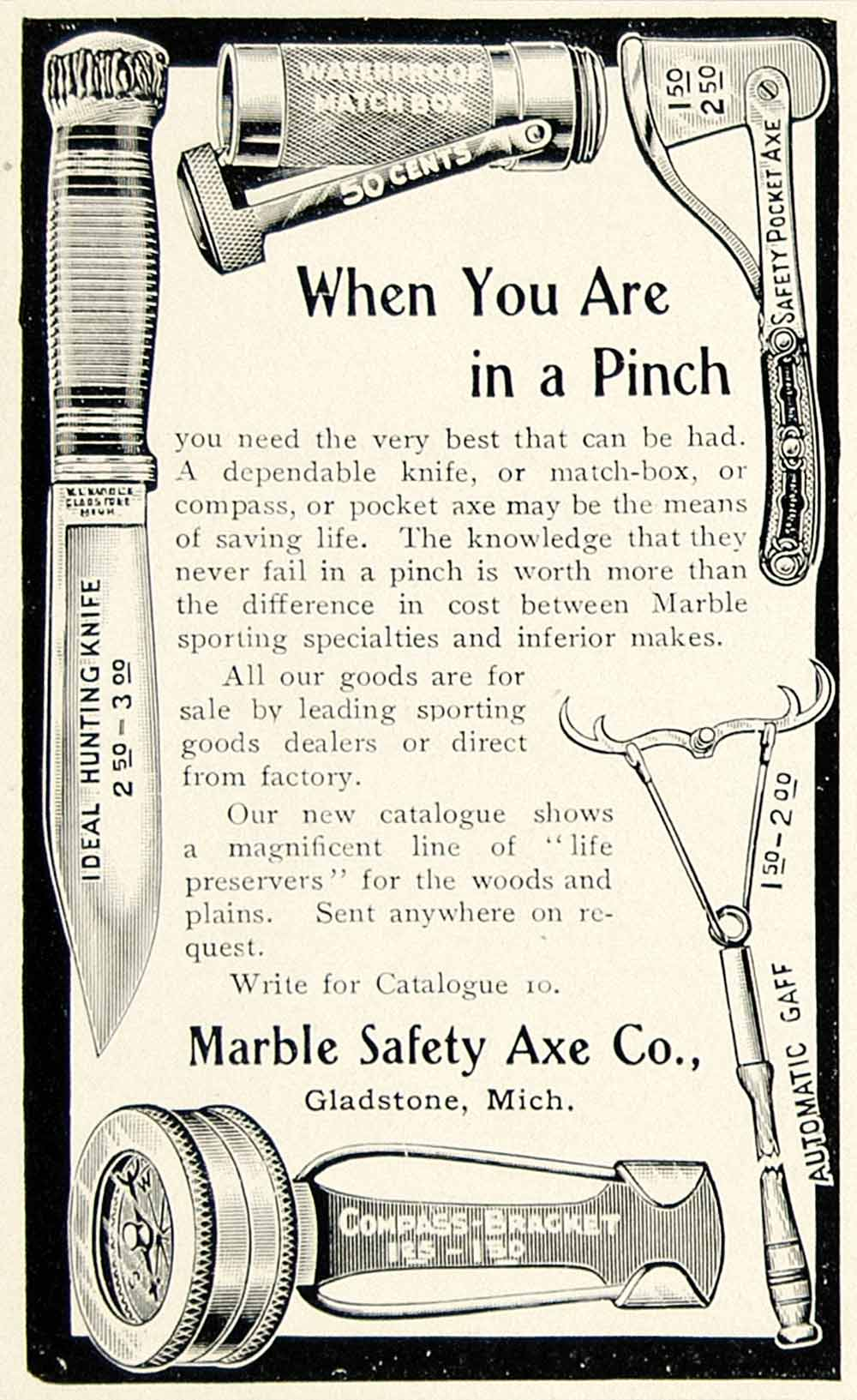
Marble Safety Axe Co. advertisement, ca. 1903.

At the beginning of the 20th-century, Americans began to view the outdoors as more than just a place to source resources. Until the early 1900s, fishing, hunting, camping, and other outdoor activities were done to survive, not have fun. Webster Marble, an avid outdoorsman who had grown up trapping, fishing, and hunting alongside his father, sensed the public's rapidly growing interest in the outdoors and jumped to capitalize on it. Marble was an inventor who believed that a person only needed four simple items to be safe in the woods: a waterproof compass that secured to your clothes, a sturdy hatchet, a well-designed knife and a waterproof matchbox.

=== History ===
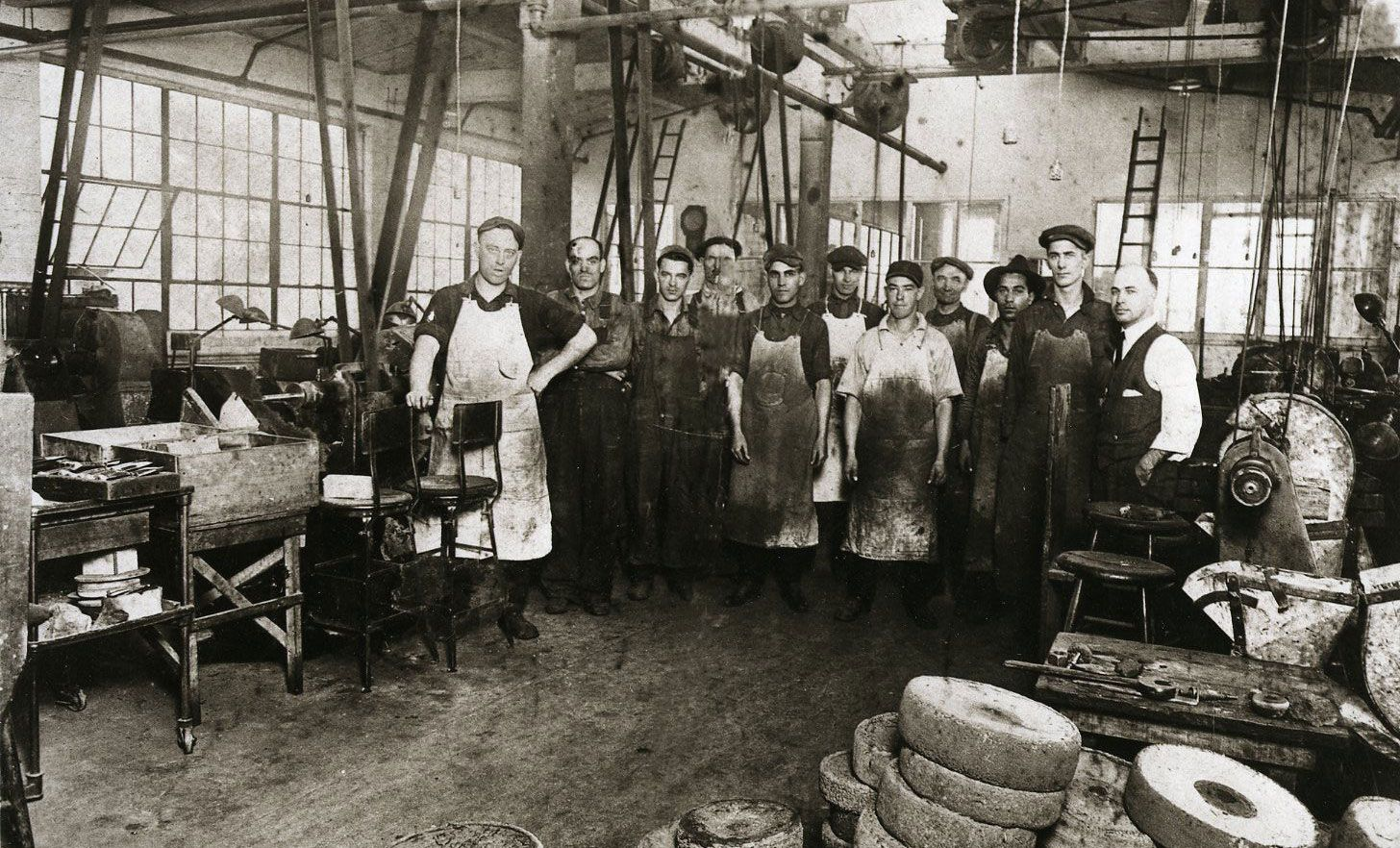
Factory workers at Marble Safety Axe Co., c. 1920.

In the early 1890s, Webster Marble created the first Marble Universal Gunsight from his garage in Gladstone, patenting his invention under the name Gladstone Manufacturing Company. The gunsight would eventually be manufactured in 37 sizes to accommodate a number of popular gun models, including those made by Winchester, Marlin, Remington and Colt, though the Financial Panic of 1893 delayed their wider release (and thus the start of the company) by over a decade.

Marble continued working on his inventions in his garage at odd hours, while returning to timber cruising to support his family, until 1898. He had a brand-new invention that gave his company a new name, the Marble Safety Axe Company, so he extended his workshop to include 640 sq. ft. of floor space. For a year, the company would only produce the Marble Safety Axe – until the wealthy founder of Gladstone itself, Frank H. Van Cleve, became a partner in the business. In 1900, with investments from Van Cleve and a second nearby financier named James T. Jones, Marble Safety Axe Co. moved to a 24,000 sq. ft. factory that was lauded as the largest of its kind in the world. The company's name would undergo several more changes, but it would remain at this location until more than three decades after Webster Marble's death.

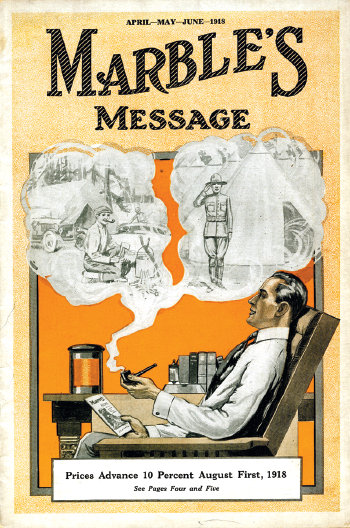
Marbles Message cover, August 1918.

=== Marketing ===
Webster Marble used many advertising techniques that are still popular today, as he had an early understanding of the importance of marketing in retail. In the early 1900s, Webster sent boxes of his merchandise to stores across the United States that he thought might be suited to carry his products. He even included a packet of instructions on the best way to display Marble products in every package. In 1899, Webster travelled to New York City to showcase his products at the national Sports Expo at Madison Square Garden. At the height of his marketing ideas, Marble distributed more than 1 million copies of Marble's Message monthly magazine, and his advertising had been seen by more than 20 million people by 1912. He sent his marketing materials to more than 50 national outdoors magazines, changing his address slightly each time so he could chart how much each magazine had helped his sales just by looking at the envelopes of the orders. This allowed him to funnel more of his advertising budget towards running ads in the exact national magazines that generated the most revenue for his company.

In 1905, Webster Marble tried celebrity endorsements and hired trick shooter and expert marksman Captain Jack O'Connell to serve as head of Marble's Sighting Department. If a customer purchased a Marble gunsight, they could have it professionally installed and sighted by Captain O'Connell for merely the cost of ammunition. If you didn't purchase your gunsight from Marble but still wanted to see the Captain, you could use the service by paying a $1 fee to the company. Captain Jack O'Connell was the only real person ever pictured in a Marble's advertisement.

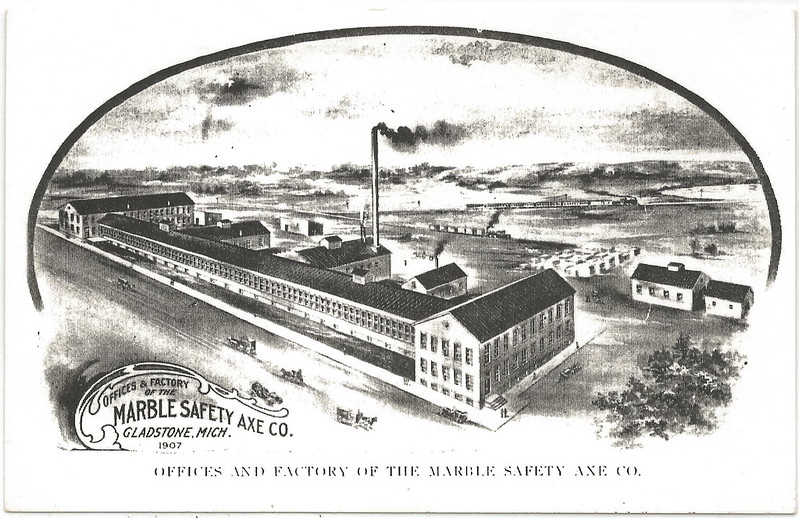
Postcard of Marble Safety Axe Co., 1907.

=== Legacy ===
For more than 125 years, the company that Webster Marble founded has outfitted fishermen, soldiers, scouts, hunters, and campers with reliable tools for the outdoors. The present Marble Arms manufacturing facility was built in 1966 in Gladstone and is still in operation today. As of 2022, Marble Arms employs dozens of workers who primarily manufacture Marble gunsights that are distributed by an exclusive number of firearms businesses in the United States, Canada, Australia, and Germany. Two successful Delta County businesses, Bark River Knives and Rapid River Knifeworks, were founded by former Marble Arms employees in the early 2000s.

In 1966, a man in Iowa named Dennis Hoegh invented a vacuum-formed plastic, hard-shell gun case. Hoegh soon made a deal with Marble Arms that included a generous relocation package, opening a brand new vacuum-formed plastic factory in Gladstone later that year. Marble's deal ended soon after, leaving Hoegh with a factory full of expensive machinery specifically built for manufacturing small plastic boxes. In 1971 Hoegh received a $50,000 small business loan and used it to create the world's first pet casket manufacturing company. The Hoegh Pet Casket factory remained in Gladstone as the world leader in pet casket production for decades, generating a reported $5 million a year in revenue. The company was purchased and rebranded to simply Hoegh Caskets in 2019 as a sign of respect and acknowledgement of the human need for such products.

== Notable inventions ==
Over the course of his lifetime, Webster Marble registered official patents for more than 60 of his best inventions. Today, Marble Arms is largely known for producing quality all-steel gunsights, though they were best known for crafting hunting knives, safety axes, fishing gaffs, match safes, and waterproof compasses during Webster's time. Webster Marble's inventions set the standard for outdoor tools in the 20th-century, with many of them still in use by people looking to safely enjoy the outdoors today.

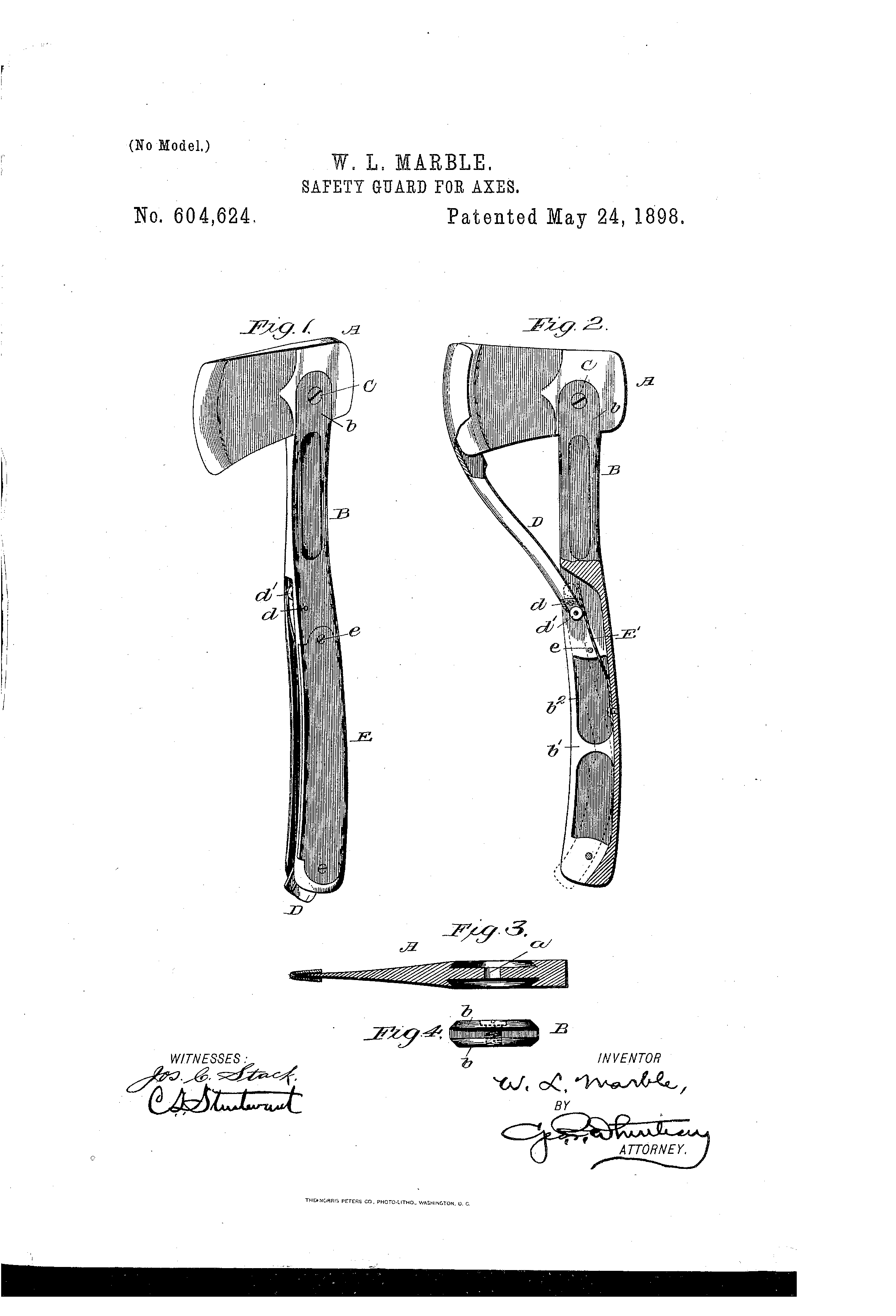
Marble Safety Axe patent application, 1898.

=== Marble Safety Axe ===
During his decades working in the woods as a timber cruiser, Marble saw an unfortunate number of men become severely injured by the exposed, razor-sharp edge of their axe blade. One of Marble's first major inventions, the Marble Safety Axe No. 3 featured an attached blade cover that folded into the handle when the axe was in use. Webster's company was renamed the Marble Safety Axe Company by the time his patent for the safety axe was approved in 1898. After finding success with their first safety axe, Marble Safety Axe Co. produced 11 different models from 1911 until the mid-1970s.

=== Hunting knives ===
Prior to Marble's inventions, the only knives available for outdoorsmen were either flimsy kitchen-style knives or Bowie-style fighting knives. The Marble Ideal knife introduced in 1900 was built for the outdoors, featuring a sturdy handle that made it practical to use for a host of tasks and reliable enough to be easily carried by anyone. The Ideal could be customized by the purchaser, with options available for the handle, guards and sheaths, and blade lengths ranging from 4–8 inches. The larger Marble Woodcraft knife was introduced in 1915 as the choice knife for hunters and trappers, with the Boy Scouts of America endorsing it as the official knife of the Boy Scouts from 1933 to 1940. The small Marble Sport knife of the late 1920s became the official knife of the Girl Scouts of America, with the Boy Scouts authorizing it as a cheaper alternative to the Woodcraft that was then required for scouts. Marble's knives were offered with a variety of handles, but the most popular was a stacked leather washer handle introduced and popularized by Webster. Marble Arms ended most knife production in 1976, selling the trademark to an overseas business.

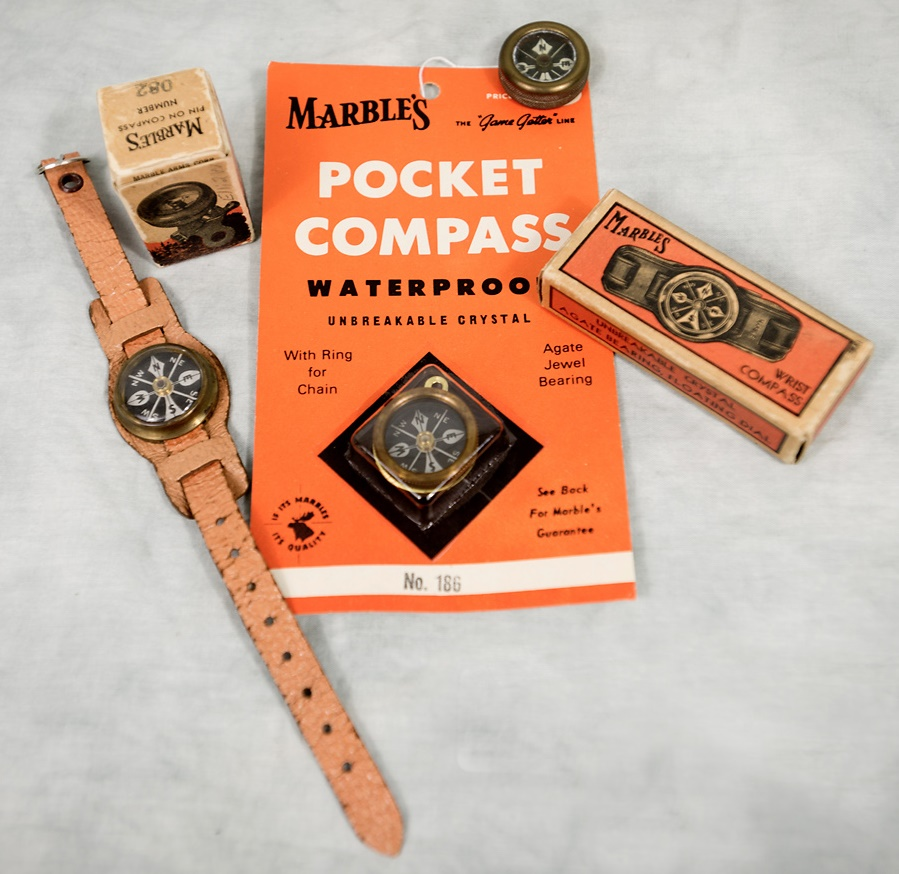
Marble Waterproof Compasses, Webster Marble: Inventing the Outdoors.

=== Marble Waterproof Compass ===
Very familiar with navigating in the woods under a plethora of conditions, Webster invented a compass that could be easily viewed from any angl under any weather conditions. Marble crafted the compass with a pin-back, reasoning that it would be significantly harder to lose a compass attached to your shirt than it would be to lose one that was just thrown in your pocket. Marble's compass was the first-ever to use a "compass card," a Webster invention that caused the entire compass-face to rotate instead of just the compass needle, resulting in a new compass that was easy to read in any lighting conditions. The Marble Waterproof Compass was a gamechanger for personal navigation, as it was easy to read if you were unfamiliar with orienteering and it was small enough to pin to your jacket and carry every day. In addition to extensive use of the Marble Compass by soldiers during WWI, both Admiral Peary and Admiral Byrd are said to have worn brass-button Marble Waterproof Compasses on their jackets while mounting several of their expeditions to the North and South Poles.

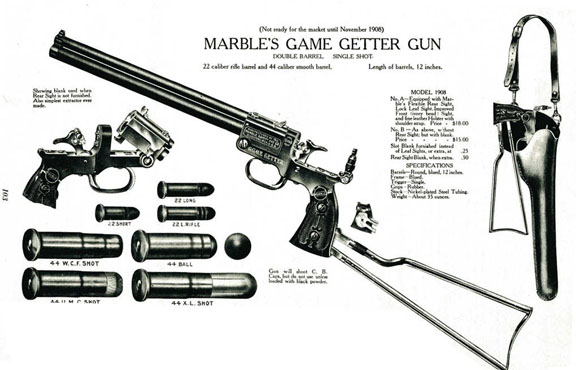
Marble Game Getter advertisement, c. 1908.

=== Marble Game Getter ===
The first Marble Game Getter was a double-barreled combination gun that featured a folding stock, intended to make it easier to carry when trapping. The original Game Getter Model 1908 was manufactured from 1908 until 1914, and a second edition was released seven years later (Model 1921) and offered in several barrel lengths: 12, 15, and 18-inches. The National Firearms Act of 1934 reduced the number of sizes offered to one, as the company chose to avoid new taxes and restrictions imposed on firearms with barrel lengths under 18-inches. The gun was discontinued entirely in 1942, before the company began producing the latest Marble Game Getter model in 2009. Notably, 26th-President Teddy Roosevelt is said to have enjoyed using both the Game Getter and Marble products in general, going as far as to carry Marble knives, compasses, and matchboxes on his expeditions to Africa in 1909 and to the Amazon in 1914.

=== Marble Match Safe ===
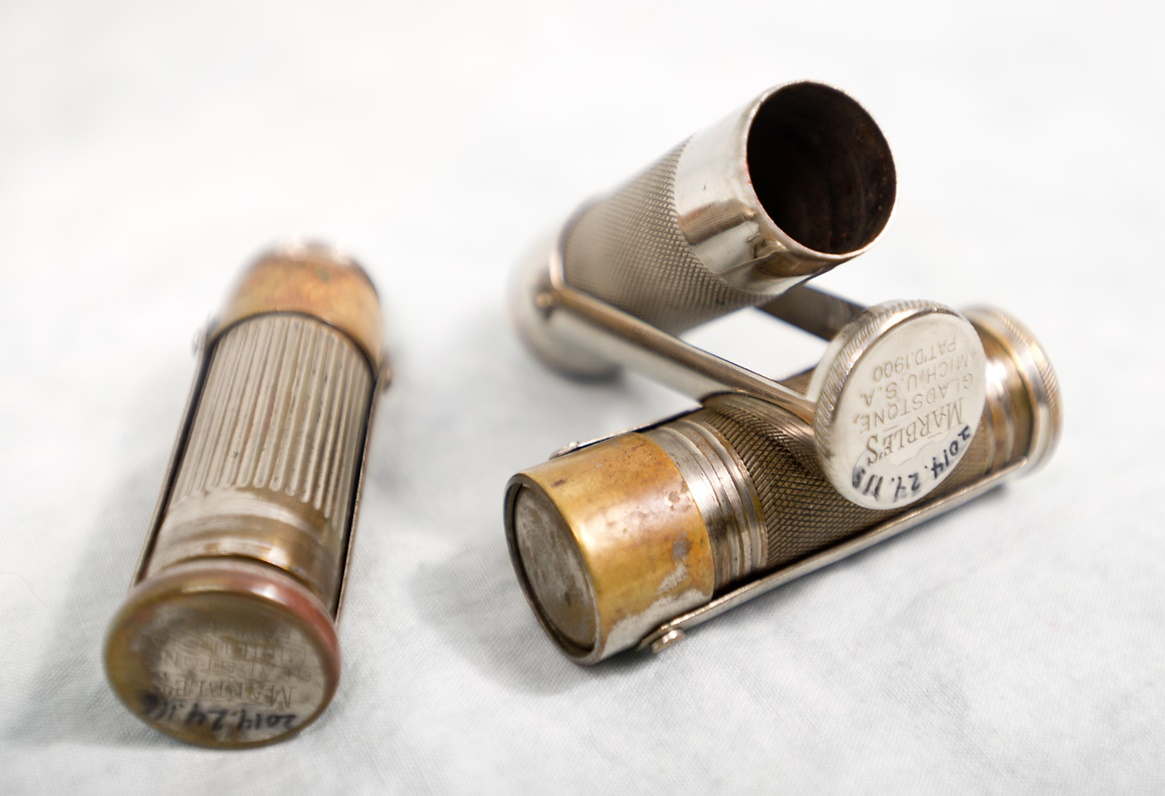
Marble Match Safes, Webster Marble: Inventing the Outdoors.

After falling into the Sturgeon River while camping, thus soaking the matches he needed to light a fire and dry himself, Webster Marble set out to invent a waterproof matchbox. Webster created the first prototype by sliding an empty 12 gauge shotgun shell into an empty 10 gauge shotgun shell, creating a small waterproof pocket. The official Marble's Match Safe was a small metal cylinder with a striking surface on the outside and an attached lid that formed a waterproof seal to protect the matches stored inside, first patented in 1900. The first Marble Match Safe was manufactured until 1903 and featured a small screw that attached the lid to the container, which was subsequently removed from the match safes manufactured from 1903 to 1928. In 1928 the model was once again updated to feature a ribbed metal striking surface, this time produced by Marble Arms until production ended in the 1940s.

On May 21, 1927, aviator Charles Lindbergh successfully completed the first non-stop, solo, from New York City to Paris across the Atlantic Ocean. He relied on a Marble Match Safe to keep his matches dry for that 33-hour flight, and kept a small Marble Compass pinned to his coat. Lindbergh would eventually carry numerous Marble products on future continental flights and tours, several of which are now preserved by the Smithsonian.

== Recognition ==
In addition to notable outdoorsmen who used Marble products, including Teddy Roosevelt, Charles Lindbergh, and Admirals Peary and Byrd, both the United States Army and the British Army ordered vital tools from Marble. The British Army adopted Marble Safety Axes in 1903, and made Marble hunting knives standard-issue for soldiers in 1916. The United States Army installed Marble Compasses in army trucks in WWI, and the United States Navy ordered hundreds of Pilot Survival Knives in 1958. Both the Boy Scouts of America and the Girl Scouts of America endorsed Marble knives as the official knife of their respective organizations, encouraging scouts across the country to keep a Marble knife in their pockets. In 2010, Marble Arms was recognized as one of "Michigan's Top 50 Companies to Watch."

Webster Marble was an early inductee to the Sporting Goods Industry Hall of Fame, created by the National Sporting Goods Association in 1955. Marble's legacy in the industry was solidified with his induction to the Hall of Fame in 1965 alongside Fred Bowman, creator of Wilson Sporting Goods, and Howard Head, inventor of laminated skis.

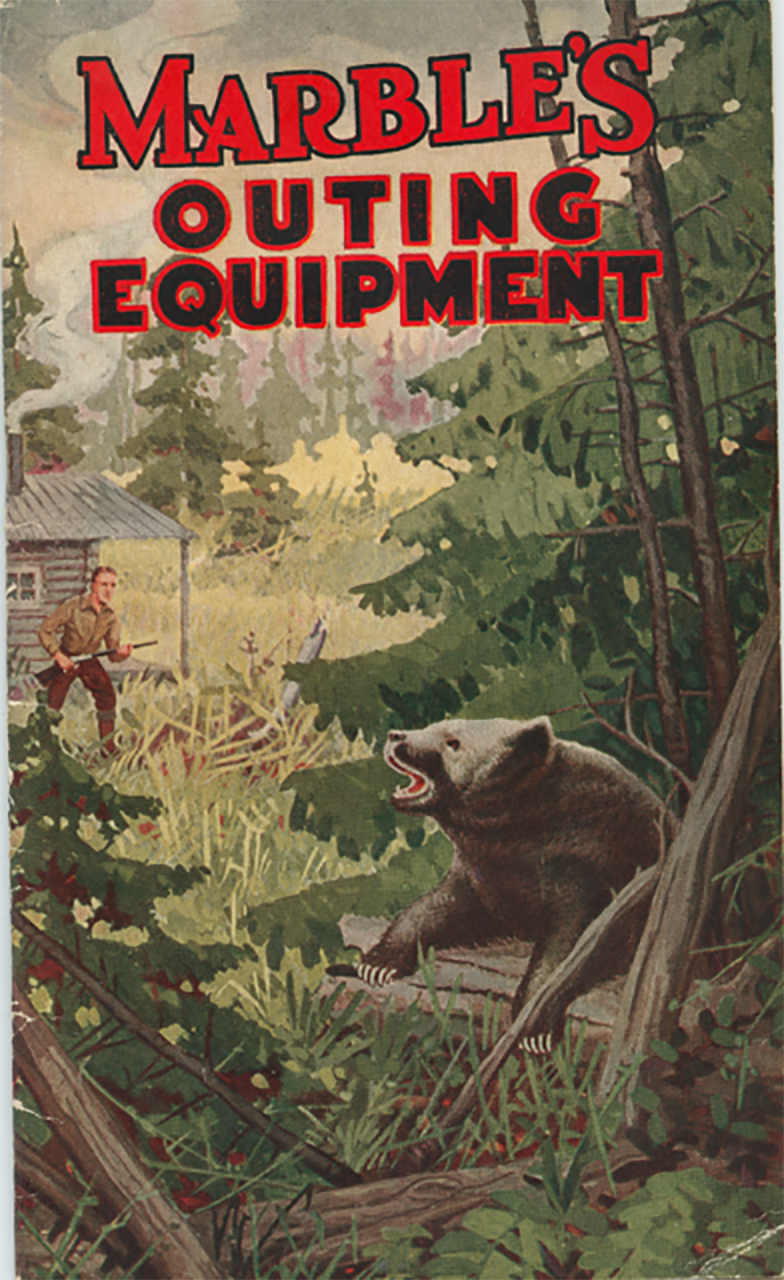
Cover of Marble Arms' Outing Equipment catalog.

=== Collections ===
Items invented by Webster Marble and manufactured by his company are held in the permanent collections of numerous institutions, including the Smithsonian, National Museum of American History, National Air and Space Museum, Pritzker Military Museum & Library, Canadian War Museum, and Buffalo Bill Center of the West. In addition, his products have appeared in temporary exhibitions at the Museum of Modern Art in New York City and the J.M. Davis Arms and Historical Museum in Claremore, Oklahoma.

=== Webster Marble: Inventing the Outdoors Museum ===
In 2015, the Michigan History Center in Lansing (operated by the Michigan Department of Natural Resources) curated the first solo exhibition of Webster Marble's products and influence following a large donation of Marble Arms memorabilia from collector Dennis Pace. Pace had acquired more than 300-pieces of Marble related material over 40 years, including marketing material, literature, and Marble Arms products. He donated his collection to the history center for use in a future exhibit and was ultimately named curator of such exhibit shortly after in recognition of his vast knowledge on the topic. Pace worked with Marble's great-grandchildren to find photos and information in their family archives to accompany his donation in the exhibit. The Webster Marble exhibit quickly grew to be one of the most popular the history center had ever displayed, and in 2016 it was loaned to the Michigan Iron Industry Museum in Marquette County. It was on display there until 2017, when it was placed in storage while a permanent facility was constructed.

In 2019, the Webster Marble: Inventing the Outdoors Museum opened in the newly-built Delta County Multi-Use Complex at the U.P. State Fairgrounds in Escanaba, Michigan. The permanent building is shared by several local organizations and is located just a ten-minute drive from the Marble Arms manufacturing facility. The 4,000 sq. ft. exhibit offers free admission and features a Ford Model T touring vehicle, Marble Game Getters, marketing material, and many of Marble's safety axes, hunting knives, gun sights, and match boxes. The Webster Marble exhibit marks the first time the Michigan History Center has ever permanently loaned a portion of its collection to another facility.

=== Webster L. Marble Day ===
On November 5, 2015, Escanaba-native and Michigan State Senator Tom Casperson introduced a resolution to declare November 15 "Webster L. Marble Day" in the State of Michigan. He chose November 15 intentionally, as it the annual opening day of deer hunting season in Michigan.

"Historians recognize Webster Marble was a genius as an inventor, manufacturer, marketer and one of the Upper Peninsula’s most successful business leaders — yet most people in our state are unaware of his pioneering achievements. The tribute to his accomplishments by the Legislature is long overdue, and I hope Michigan citizens will embrace the opportunity to learn more about his efforts at innovation and to advance outdoor recreation."

— State Senator Tom Casperson, November 5, 2015

Casperson's campaign was successful, and the state government accepted his resolution to declare November 15 Michigan's annual "Webster L. Marble Day." Marble Day is celebrated locally in Gladstone and Escanaba, with the Marble Museum hosting special events and promotions every year.

== See also ==
- Marble Arms
- Marble Game Getter
- Webster Marble: Inventing the Outdoors
- marblearms.com
