= Gladstone Area Public Schools =

School district in Michigan, United States

Gladstone Area Schools

Address
- 400 South 10th Street Gladstone, Delta County, Michigan, 49837; United States
- Coordinates: 46.43029°N 86.50085°W

District information
- Type: Public school district
- Grades: Pre-Kindergarten-12
- Superintendent: Jay Kulbertis
- School board: 7 members
- Accreditation: Michigan Department of Education
- Schools: W.C. Cameron Elementary, James T. Jones Elementary, Gladstone Junior High School, Gladstone High School
- Budget: $17,603,000 2021-2022 expenditures
- NCES District ID: 2615970

Students and staff
- Students: 1,478 (2023-2024)
- Teachers: 81.82 (on an FTE basis) (2023-2024)
- Staff: 174.47 FTE (2023-2024)
- Student–teacher ratio: 18.06 (2023-2024)
- Athletic conference: MHSAA Class B
- District mascot: Braves
- Colors: Purple and white

Other information
- Website: www.gladstoneschools.com

Gladstone Area Public Schools is a public school district serving approximately 1,500 students in Gladstone, Michigan. In addition to two elementary school buildings, one middle school, and one high school, the school district is also responsible for the local public library. The district covers an area of 87 square miles, serving a total population of approximately 9,000 who live in the city of Gladstone, Escanaba Township, and Brampton Township.

== History ==
In 1958, the district debuted the new James T. Jones Elementary School down the street from the high school. At the time, construction was overseen by architect Warren Holmes Co. from Lansing, Michigan, with the total cost ultimately exceeding $275,000. The school was named after longtime Gladstone community member James T. Jones, who served on the school board for over three decades and worked at nearby Marble Arms for 60+ years. As of 2021, James T. Jones serves more than 300 students in third-fifth grades.

In the 1960s, the old high school building nearby was demolished and a new health and recreation building was built in its place. In 1975, the district purchased school buildings from the closing All Saints Catholic Church parochial school near James T. Jones to use as the new middle school. During purchasing negotiations, the school district agreed not to hold school-sponsored events on one particular evening each week to facilitate the attendance of students who wished to go to religious education at the church. As of 2022, this agreement still stands.

The district unveiled a new high school building in the fall of 1999, located roughly 1.5 miles away from W.C. Cameron Elementary School and 3.5 miles from the junior high/James T. Jones Elementary. The new building features a large gymnasium, auditorium, and cafeteria, as well as music, wood-shop, and arts facilities, with four separate wings for core classes. The old building became the current Junior High school, connected to James T. Jones Elementary via a shared cafeteria, library, and gymnasium.

== Student demographics ==
As of 2022, Gladstone High School serves 450 9th–12th grade students; Gladstone Junior High serves 350 6th–8th grade students; James T. Jones Elementary serves 300 3rd–5th grade students; and W.C. Cameron Elementary serves 400 K-2nd grade students.

As of 2020, more than 1,500 K-12 students attended Gladstone Area Public Schools, which hosts a graduation rate of 92%. Approximately 85 teachers are employed by the district, for an overall average student-teacher ratio of 18:1. Across all grades, approximately 36% of students come from households that are considered economically disadvantaged. More than 88% of students identify as white, while 5% of the remaining students are two or more races, 4.5% are Native American, and 1% are Hispanic/Latino. Less than 1% of students are African American or Asian.

== Curriculums ==
Gladstone Junior High houses the district's Title VII Native American Education facility, which offers support, resources, and education to both the district's Native students and the greater student population. The program aims to educate everyone about local Native American culture, language, and heritage by offering classes, workshops, clubs, presentations, and celebrations. The program is funded through the Bureau of Indian Education, with additional support from the local Hannahville Indian Community and the Sault Ste. Marie Tribe of Chippewa Indians.

The Gladstone School District offers K-12 music education and boasts a high school marching band that is active in community events including sports games, parades, and the local Honor Flight. The school holds band and choir concerts twice yearly for middle and high school students. School-sponsored activities at the middle school include snow club, Quiz bowl, chess club, builders' club, book club, student council, and Science Olympiad. High school activities include National Honor Society, Quiz Bowl, and student council.

The district also participates in the Delta-Schoolcraft Intermediate School District (DSISD), to use services like the Learning Center for students with disabilities and the Vocational Technical Center for occupational programs. Opportunities offered to high school students through the DSISD include coursework in product design, childcare, automotive technology, welding, health occupations, and engineering.

== Athletics ==
The school district houses several gymnasiums and offers numerous athletic opportunities to students. Gyms available for use by school sports and events include a small gym at W.C. Cameron Elementary School and two larger gyms: one at the high school and one used jointly by James T. Jones Elementary School and the junior high school. The high school also houses a fully equipped weight room and walking track, both of which are regularly open for use by the public.

School-sponsored varsity and junior-varsity athletics available to high school students include the following: separate teams for boys' and girls' basketball, golf, and tennis; competitive and sideline cheerleading; co-ed track and field, cross-country running, bowling, and swimming; girls' volleyball and softball; and boys' wrestling, football, and baseball. Middle school sports include: track and field, cross country running, competitive cheerleading, youth football, and both boys' and girls' basketball.
