= Terry Ahola =

Member of the US Ski Team

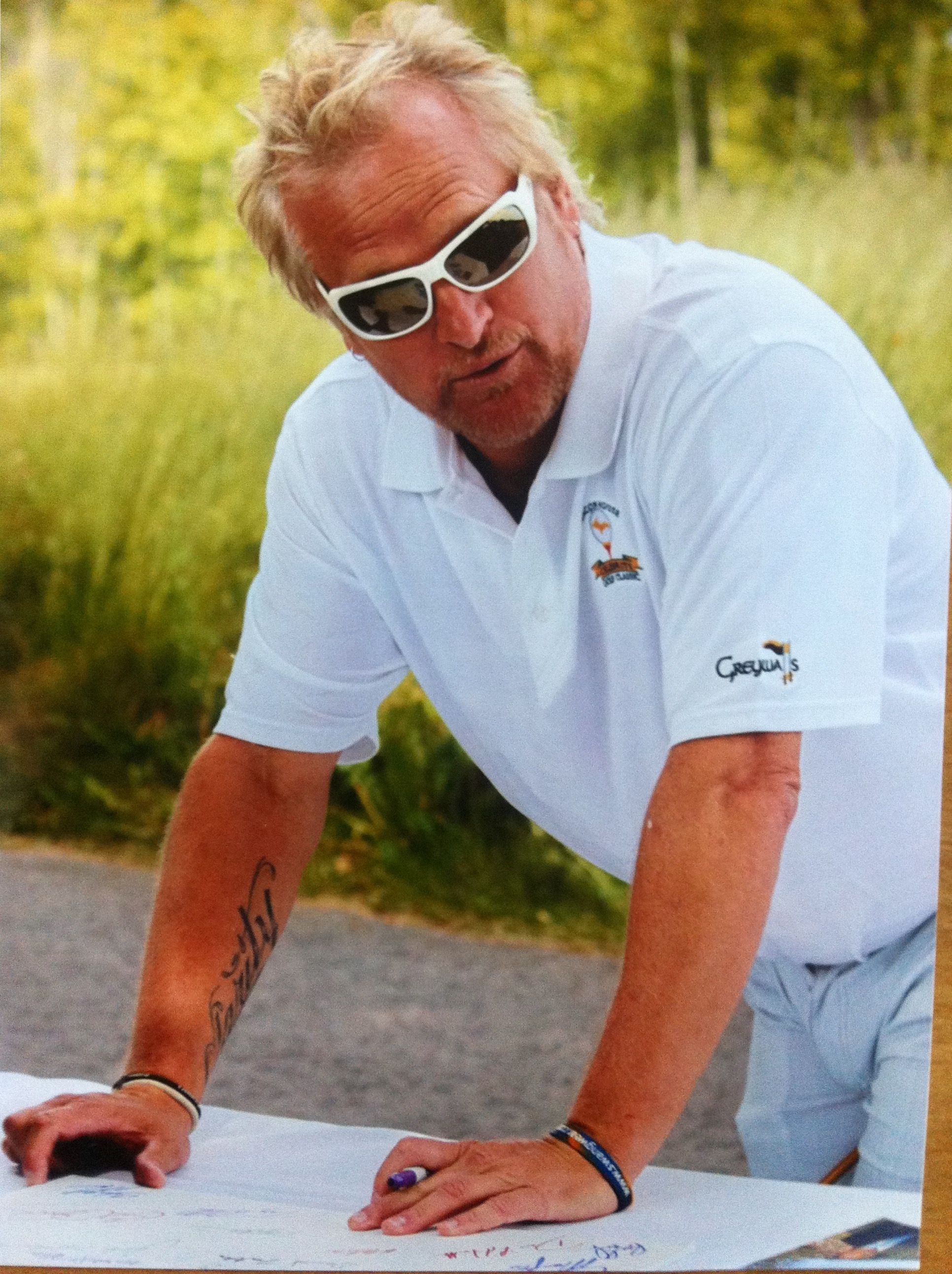
Terry Ahola

Terry Ahola is a former member of the U.S. Ski Team. A native of Gladstone, Michigan, he spent three seasons on the U.S. Ski Team from 1982-84 before having his career shortened by a serious knee injury.

Ahola competed on the Europa Cub/World Cup series before joining the North American Pro Tour in 1984. He was named selected as Western Rookie of the Year in 1984. He remained on the pro tour until 1991. Ahola later joined the Legends of Skiing at Vail. He is considered a “valued ambassador of the sport” of skiing and often represents the U.S. Ski Team at charity events throughout the United States. Ahola was inducted into the Upper Peninsula Sports Hall of Fame in his native Michigan in 2008.

He learned to ski at Ludington State Park in Michigan, and said that his father, Kip, made his first pair of ski boots by cutting off the tips of an old pair of shoes and nailing them onto skis. Ahola’s first formal ski run was at the Danforth, Michigan Ski Hill.

His post-skiing career has included commentating on skiing events for ESPN and doing a commercial for Maxwell House coffee (1988). Ahola currently operates a hotel located in Michigan’s Upper Peninsula and works for Banshee Music, of Milwaukee, Wisconsin as an artist liaison.
