= Marble Game Getter =

Combination gun

- Marble Game Getter.
- Type: Combination gun
- Place of origin: United States

Production history
- Designer: Webster L. Marble (1854—1930)
- Manufacturer: Marble's Arms & Manufacturing Company (formerly Marble Safety Axe Co.)
- Produced: 1908—1962; 2009—present

Specifications
- Mass: 2¼lb
- Barrel length: 12″, 15″, 18″, 18½″ variants
- Cartridge: .22 LR/.44 Shotshell, .22 LR/.410 bore, Other, less common, rifle calibers (see text)
- Action: Break-action
- Feed system: Tip-up barrels
- Sights: Fixed front-sight, folding, tang rear-sight

The Marble Game Getter is a light, double-barrel (over-under), combination gun manufactured by the Marble's Arms & Manufacturing Company in Gladstone, Michigan. The firearm features a skeleton folding stock and a rifled barrel over a smooth-bore shotgun barrel. A manually pivoted hammer striker is used to select the upper or lower barrel. Three generations of the system were/are produced—First Generation (Model 1908), Second Generation (Model 1921) and the briefly produced Third Generation.

== Variants ==
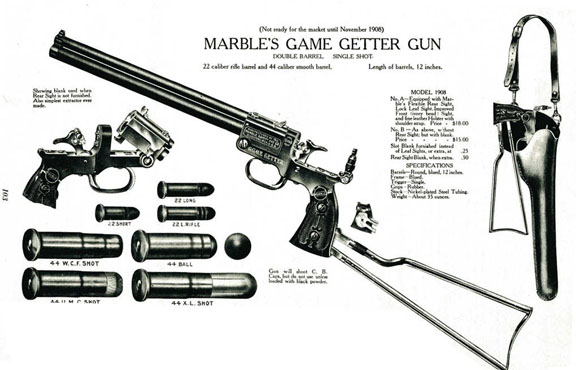
Poster of Marble Game Getter

=== The First Generation (Model 1908) ===
The Model 1908 was primarily produced in its standard configuration, a .22 Short/.22 LR over .44 Shotshell configuration, though other rifle calibers were produced (e.g., .25-20, .32-20, .38-40); The first production models were available for sale by November of 1908, according to company advertisements. A barrel length of 15″ was common, though some 18″ and 12″ models were produced. The Model 1908 was produced between 1908 and 1918. This model is stamped "-MANUFACTURED BY THE- MARBLE SAFETY AXE CO. -GLADSTONE, MICH. U.S.A.-" and "GAME GETTER" on the left side. The serial number is on the frame, below the barrels, and is accessed by pulling the trigger guard to the rear.

Two variations of the Model 1908 were made, the 1908A and 1908B. The former featured a flexible rear tang sight mounted behind the hammer and the latter had the sight hole plugged.

=== The Second Generation (Model 1921) ===
Production of the Model 1921 started in 1921 and was essentially a new design. The grip, folding stock, safety, and several other features were redesigned. The Model 1921 was generally produced in either a .22 LR over .44 Shotshell or .22 LR over .410-bore shotgun configuration. The .410 model featured 2 or 2½″ chambers, with the former being much more common. Barrel lengths of 12″, 15″ and 18″ were produced. This model is stamped "MARBLE'S GAME GETTER GUN" and "MARBLE ARMS & MFG. CO. GLADSTONE, MICH. U.S.A" on the left side. The serial number is on the frame, below the barrels, and is accessed by pulling the trigger guard to the rear.

After the passage of the 1934 National Firearms Act (NFA), the 12″ and 15″ models were discontinued for domestic sales. The shorter barrel versions were offered in Canada until 1955. The last Model 1921 was produced from spare parts in 1962.

=== The Third Generation ===
A third production model was briefly produced by Marble Arms. It was similar in appearance to the Model 1908 and features a .22 LR rifle barrel over a .410-bore shotgun barrel. The only barrel length offered was 18½″.

== Regulation ==
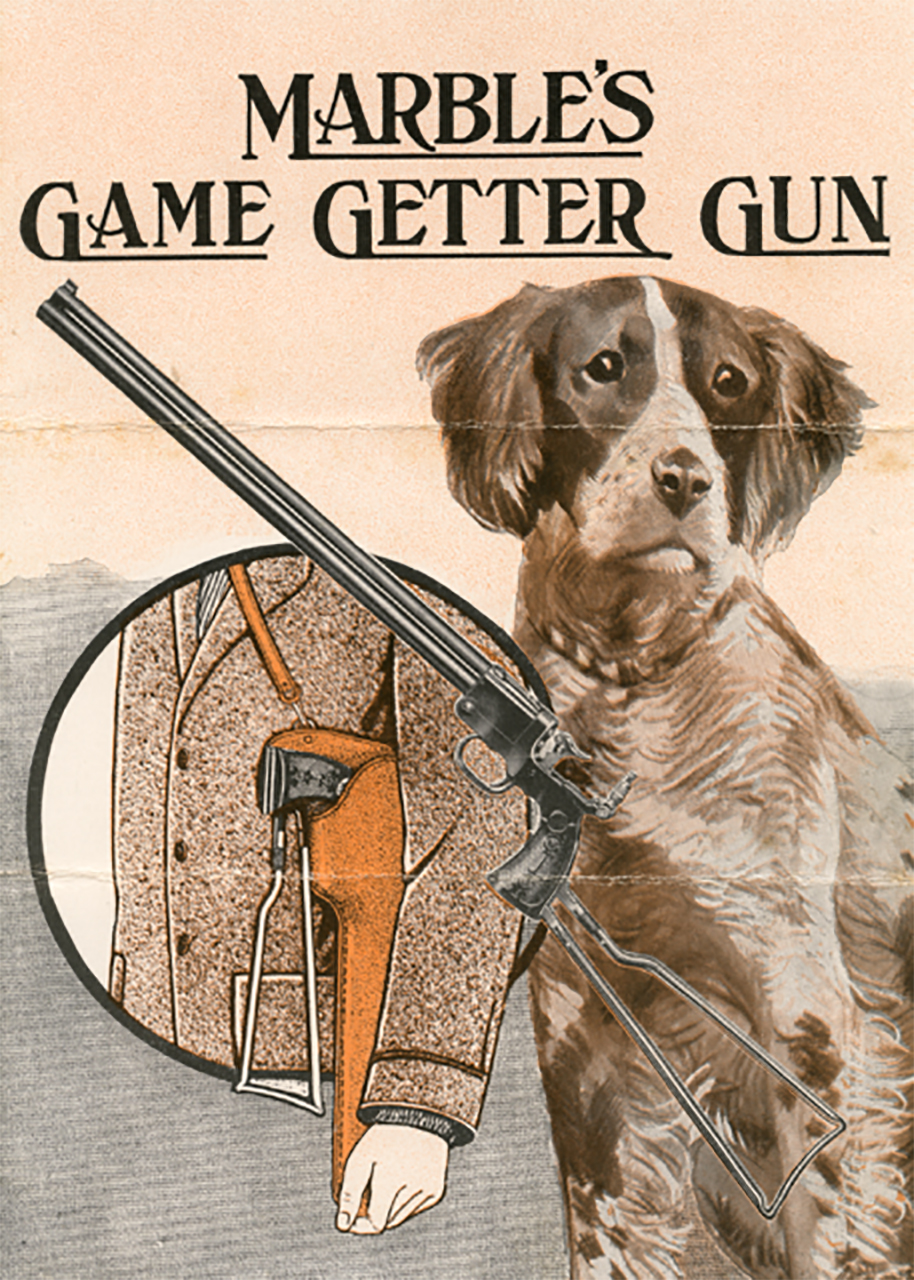
Advertisement for the Game Getter

=== Canada ===
In Canada, the Game Getter is classified as "restricted" or prohibited depending on the caliber under current laws.

=== United States ===
In the United States, due to their being single-shot combination guns, Marble Game Getter models featuring shotgun barrel lengths of more than or equal to 12 inches (30 cm) and less than 18 inches (46 cm) require a transfer tax stamp and registration as an Any Other Weapon to be in compliance with the NFA. Original Model 1908 and Model 1921 models produced before 1943 are Curios & Relics under US law, but are still subject to the provisions of the NFA if their barrels are less than 18 inches (46 cm) in length. The 18-inch barrel variation was administratively removed from the NFA in 1939 by the Bureau of Internal Revenue after determining that it was not concealable on the person. The NFA does not apply to the version with 18-inch barrels and folding stocks, but removal of the stock makes the weapon less than 26 inches (66 cm), and thus qualify as a weapon made from a rifle/shotgun under the NFA.
