= Gary M. Reynolds =

American businessman

- Born: June 21, 1952 (age 72); Milwaukee, Wisconsin, U.S.
- Occupation(s): Chairman of GMR Marketing; Chairman/CEO of Banshee Music; Chairman of the Radiate Group
- Spouse: Gail Reynolds

Gary M. Reynolds (born June 21, 1952) is the founder of GMR Marketing, of New Berlin, Wisconsin.

== Biography ==
A former professional musician, Reynolds founded GMR in 1979 on the concept of cross-promoting music group and brands, such as the Miller Band Network which connected the Miller Brewing Company to different rock bands.

GMR Marketing is owned by the Omnicom Group but Reynolds remains Chairman. Reynolds is also Chairman of the Radiate Group.

Reynolds began developing an offshoot company, Banshee Music, which began in the autumn of 2008. The agency works with sports teams, collegiate athletic programs, sporting events and sports venues in developing and marketing original, sports-related music for stadium, promotional and broadcast use. Banshee Music’s revenue model allows sports partners to share in the ownership of the music.
