= Banshee Music =

Electronic music publisher and "sonic branding" agency in Milwaukee, Wisconsin

- Company type: Private
- Industry: Music publishing, marketing
- Founded: 2007
- Headquarters: New Berlin, Wisconsin, U.S.
- Key people: Gary M. Reynolds, CEO/Chairman
- Products: Original music
- Website: http://bansheemusic.com

Banshee Music is an electronic music publisher and "sonic branding" agency in Milwaukee, Wisconsin. Founded in 2007 by GMR Marketing founder/chairman Gary M. Reynolds, Banshee Music creates original music for sports and brand clients, deploying a unique revenue model that allows clients to share partial ownership of the song rights with the writers/performers.

Reynolds, who is a former professional musician, is a music industry veteran. He formed GMR in 1979 by developing the Miller Band Network, which paired rock and roll bands with Miller Brewing Company sponsorship, and he expanded upon his musical marketing interests with the formation of Banshee Music. With the traditional music industry in flux, Reynolds developed Banshee as an opportunity for artists to exploit their music in different and more profitable ways, with no interference from record labels.

Banshee Music targets both sports clients and brand clients but also has a Live Source library (for TV and film use), and creates musical greeting cards with Recycled Paper Greetings that are available at Target stores in the USA. Banshee's most notable work, however, is its work with sports teams, college sports programs, sporting venues and sporting events. Banshee Music's sports clients include the Dallas Cowboys, Green Bay Packers, Atlanta Falcons, Orlando Magic, University of Texas, Ohio State University and the Kentucky Derby. Banshee creates original music for clients in rock, country, hip-hop, folk and pop formats that is played in stadiums and used for promotional and broadcast use, including CD and download giveaways, as well as ringtones. Revenue is also generated by direct-to-consumer sales and from leveraging corporate sponsorships. Banshee Music's first two CDs were "Party Up At The Downs," in conjunction with the 2009 Kentucky Derby, and "Bristol Nights," on behalf of NASCAR's Bristol Motor Speedway.

In 2009, Banshee Music was profiled in Sports Illustrated, USA Today and Forbes magazine.

== Notable Banshee Music contributors ==
Banshee Music's writers and performers include Grammy-nominated Johnny K (Producer of the Year nominee in 2009), Pat McCurdy, Willy Porter, Greg Koch, and members or former members of the Violent Femmes (Victor DeLorenzo), Wallflowers (Rami Jaffee), The Rembrandts (Phil Solem), Arrested Development (Kamaal Malak), Survivor (Jim Peterik, Jimi Jamison) and Velvet Revolver (Matt Sorum).

== Notable clients ==
Dallas Cowboys, Green Bay Packers, University of Texas, Atlanta Falcons, Orlando Magic, Kentucky Derby, Bristol Motor Speedway, Ohio State, University of Louisville, University of Florida, University of Tennessee, University of Texas, University of Michigan, Recycled Paper Greetings, Jeep, MTV.
