= Marble Arms =

American firearms and outdoor goods company

- Industry: firearms
- Predecessor: Marble Safety Axe Company, Gladstone Manufacturing Company,
- Founded: 1892; 134 years ago
- Founder: Webster Marble
- Headquarters: Gladstone, Michigan, United States
- Key people: Webster Marble, Frank Van Cleve
- Products: rifles, gun sights, axes, hunting knives, and other outdoor accessories
- Website: www.marblearms.com

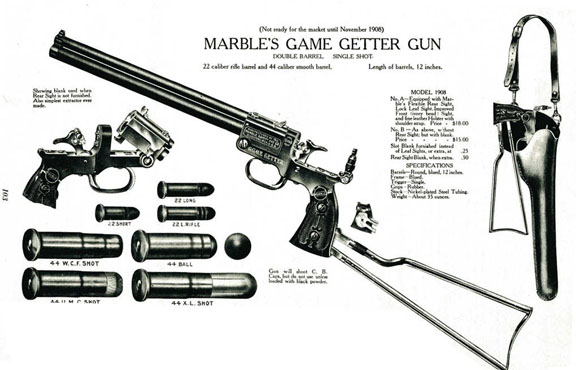
Company's advertisement

Marble Arms & Manufacturing Company of Gladstone, Michigan, is a company founded in 1892 for the invention and manufacture of the Marble Universal Rifle Sight by Webster L. Marble. Frank H. Van Cleve of Escanaba, Michigan shared patent rights on some of the early patents applied for by Webster L. Marble. Products expanded to include outdoor goods like a novel safety axe, hunting knives, match safes, compasses and the Marble Game Getter combination gun. The company grew to be a foremost manufacturer of gun sights, competing with rivals such as Lyman, Redfield, Pacific, King, and Williams gun sight companies. Still in business in Gladstone, Michigan, Marble Arms remains an important member of the firearm and shooting sports industry.

== List of Patents ==
- U.S. patent D34336 Design for a Compass Card
- U.S. patent D48624 Design for a Blade for a Hunting Knife
- U.S. patent 450,468 Adjustable Gun-sight
- U.S. patent 451,499 Front Sight for Fire Arms
- U.S. patent 604,624 Safety Guard for Axes
- U.S. patent 623,169 Tool Handle Fastening
- U.S. patent 650,944 Match-Box
- U.S. patent 650,945 Gaff Hook
- U.S. patent 728,416 Hunting Knife
- U.S. patent 741,920 Gun Sight
- U.S. patent 799,176 Cleaning Rod for Firearms
- U.S. patent 834,628 Axe-edge Protector
- U.S. patent 855,859 Pivoted Nail Claw for Axes
- U.S. patent 858,524 Front Sight
- U.S. patent 890,150 Compound Tool
- U.S. patent 894,275 Rear Sight
- U.S. patent 931,328 Firearm
- U.S. patent 961,511 Folding Stock for Firearms
- U.S. patent 982,152 Hammer for Double-Barreled Guns
- U.S. patent 990,575 Means for Attaching Supplemental Barrels to Firearms
- U.S. patent 1,009,161 Supplemental Barrel for Magazine Firearms
- U.S. patent 1,018,065 Gaff-Tongs
- U.S. patent 1,036,664 Folding Compound Tool
- U.S. patent 1,047,427 Front Sight for Firearms
- U.S. patent 1,223,411 Slide-Action Firearm
- U.S. patent 1,331,074 Detachable and Interchangeable Butt-Piece for Firearms
- U.S. patent 1,349,779 Recoil Pad for Firearms
