= Unger Brothers =

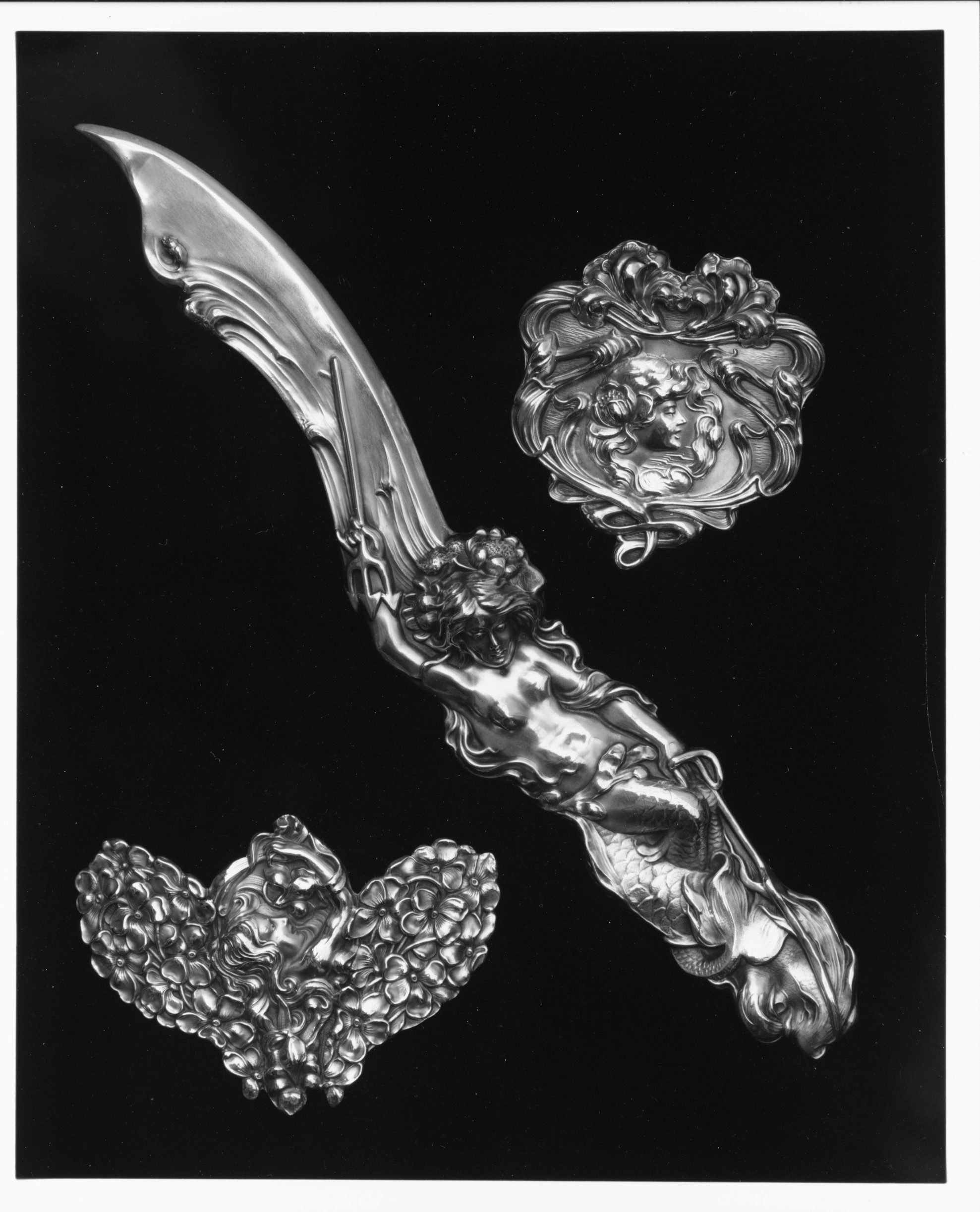
Belt buckle, circa 1900

Unger Bros. or Unger Brothers (1872–1910) was a jewelry company in Newark, New Jersey, best known for their sterling silver Art Nouveau designs.

The company was established by five sons from a German immigrant family. The oldest founded a jewelry business between 1870-1872 and began the manufacture of sterling silver items in 1878. Other sons gradually joined the firm, among them a silversmith and an engraver whose brother-in-law became the leading artistic designer. The firm's best years were from 1895 to 1907; by 1901 it had just under 300 employees. The 1903, 1904 and 1906 catalogs show over 150 hatpin designs, more than half Art Nouveau. All told, their 1904 catalog included some 3,200 distinct items; they employed stamping machines to turn out many of their products. While most items were jewelry, the best-selling items were dresser sets. They also produced tableware such as trays and sauceboats.

Unger Bros. work is collected in the Brooklyn Museum, Memphis Brooks Museum of Art, Metropolitan Museum of Art, Newark Museum, and RISD Museum.
