= Vesta case =

Box made to house wax matches

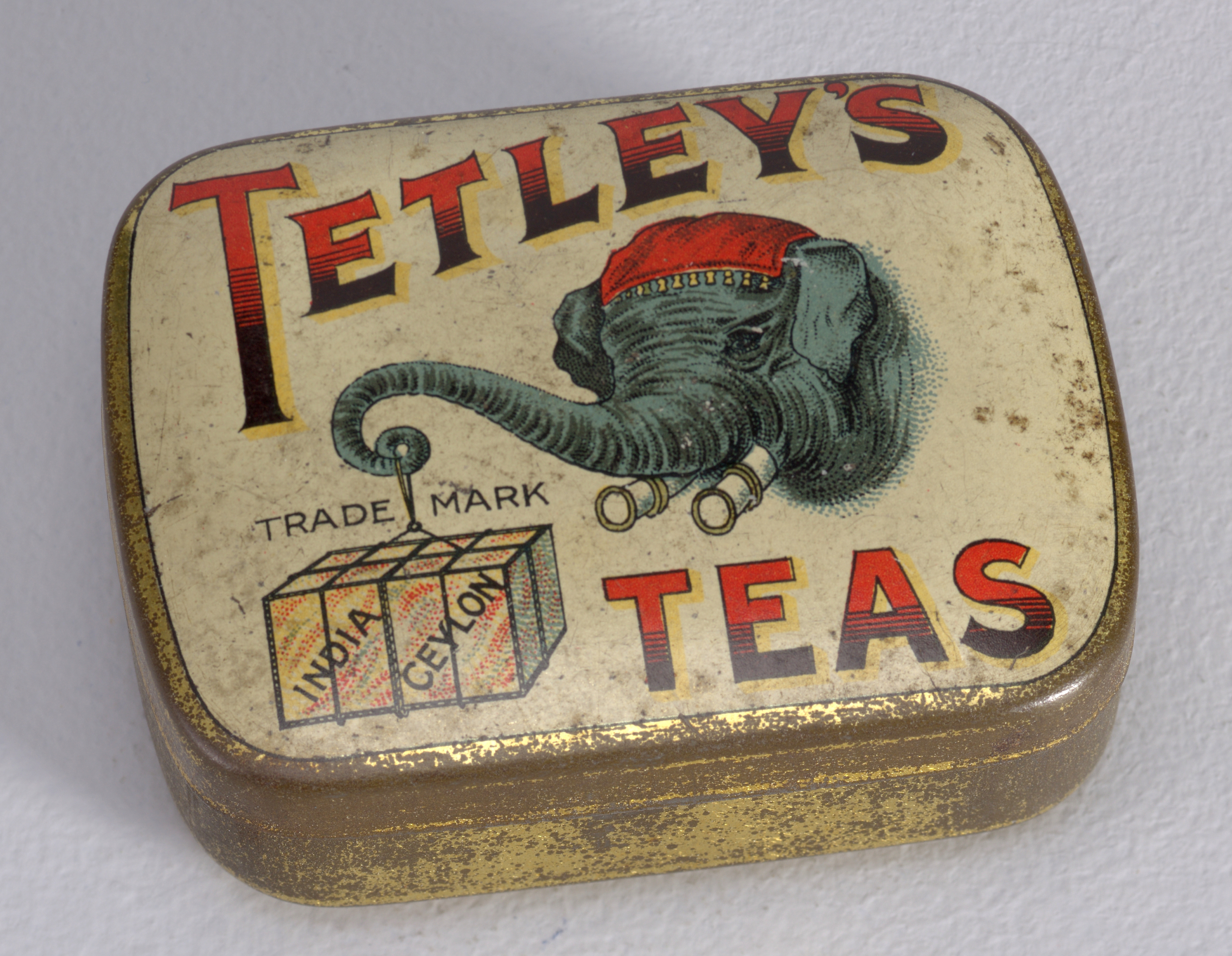
Advertising case, England, late 19th century

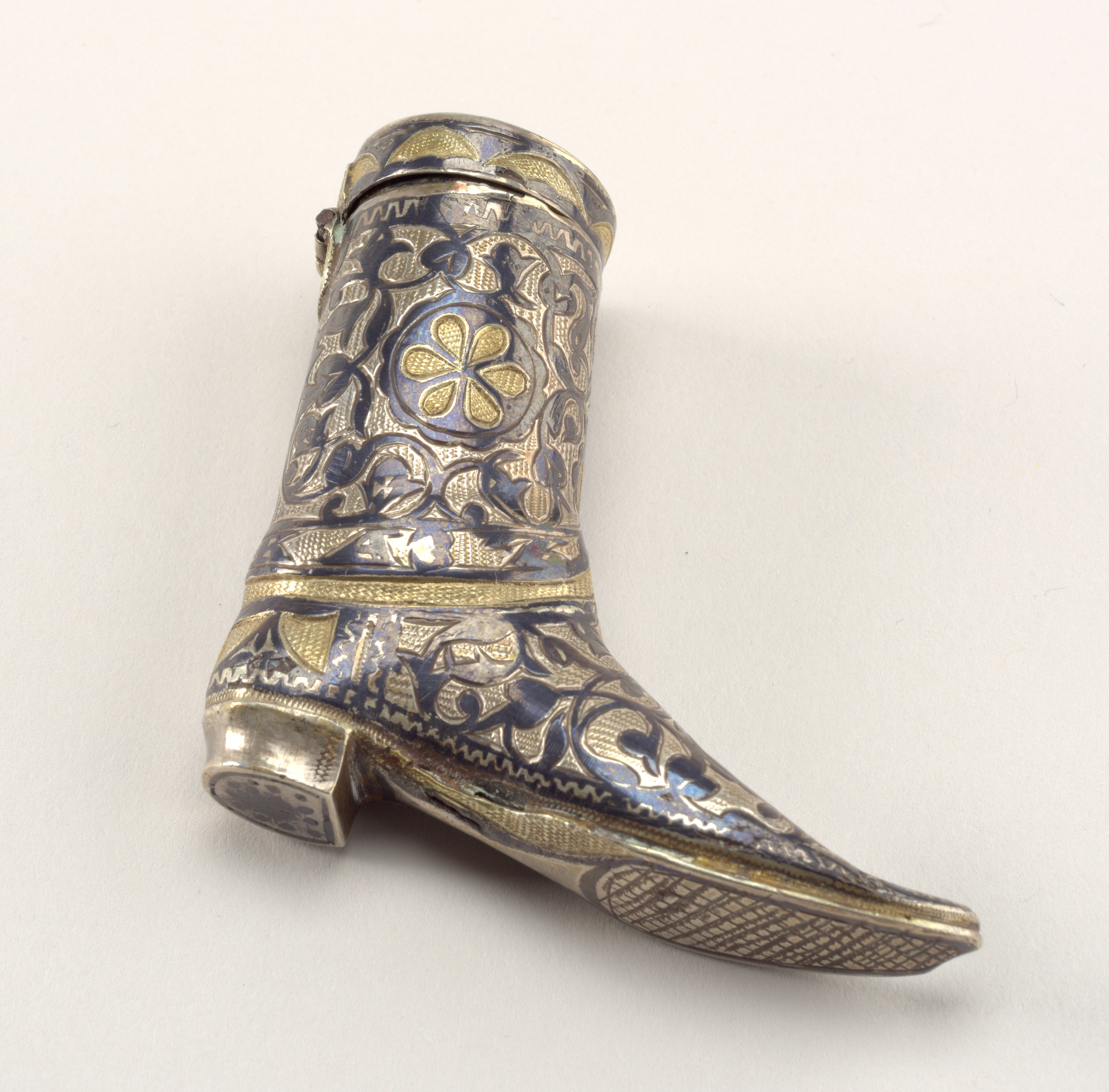
Boot Matchsafe, late 19th century, with striker on sole. Silver with niello.

A vesta case, or simply a "vesta", is a small box made to house wax, or "strike anywhere", matches. The first successful friction match appeared in 1826, and in 1832 William Newton patented the "wax vesta" in England. It consisted of a wax stem with embedded cotton threads and a tip of phosphorus. Newton named his matches after Vesta, the Roman goddess of fire and the hearth. Small containers to house these friction matches were introduced shortly afterwards (in the early 1830s), to guard against accidental combustion. In England, Australia and New Zealand, these containers took their name from the term Newton used for his invention, and they became known as "vesta cases", "vesta boxes" or simply "vestas". In North America a vesta is called simply a match safe.

There are three main forms of vesta cases: pocket vestas, table or standing vestas and "go to bed" vestas. Pocket vesta cases were the most popular form, and were often made to be suspended from a watch chain or "Albert Chain". Table vestas were usually larger than pocket vestas and left in a handy position in the home, such as the kitchen or close to a fireplace. "Go to bed" vestas were often joined to a candle stick holder or had a holder for a single match.

== Makers ==
They were made throughout the world including the United Kingdom, in the U.S.A., continental Europe, Japan and Australia. Important and notable English makers of vesta cases included silversmiths such as Mappin & Webb, Sampson Mordan, Asprey & Co., William Neale & Sons, Elkington & Co., Saunders & Shepherd, Goldsmiths & Silversmiths Ltd, Nathan & Hayes, Arthur Barnett, George Unite, Joseph Gloster, William Hutton & Sons Ltd, Robert Pringle & Sons, and William Hair Haseler, who partnered with Arthur Lasenby Liberty, the founder of Liberty.

Significant American manufacturers of match safes include Tiffany, Napier Company (jewellery), Wm. B. Kerr, Gorham, R. Wallace & Sons, Unger Brothers, Battin, Blackington, Whiting, George Scheibler and Shreve & Co. In addition, one of the world’s most famous jewellers, Faberge from Russia, was known to design vesta cases. Not surprisingly, examples of Faberge vestas are rarely seen and are among the most expensive. Georg Jensen was a Danish silversmith and founder of Georg Jensen A/S one of the best known Scandinavian jewellers, also made vestas. A well known French jeweller (and politician), Charles Murat, made beautiful art nouveau silver vestas. Christofle was another important French silversmith who made vestas. As was the Parisienne master silversmith Adolphe Frontin. In Germany, the still operating jeweller Gebruder Kuhn made beautiful art nouveau vestas. Georg Adam Scheid, operating in Vienna, was a celebrated silversmith who made vesta cases. In Australia, Kalgoorlie jeweller George Addis, well known for his gold jewellery, was known for making vestas using sea bean pods.

Silver vestas made in England were invariably hallmarked showing the assay office (most commonly Birmingham and less often London or Chester) that verified the vesta as sterling silver, i.e. containing at least 92.5% silver, a date letter identifying the year the item was assayed and a maker's mark. Detailed information on the makers of English vestas is often readily available through internet searches. These maker's marks and other hallmarks are useful for collectors who want to have a reasonable degree of confidence in the authenticity of a vesta and who want to collect vestas made by specific makers. Silver vestas manufactured in France are usually stamped with a boar's head mark or a crab mark and a maker's mark, but with no indication of the date of manufacture. Though the records of French makers are less complete than the records of English makers. Silver match safes manufactured in the USA were usually stamped with voluntary marks such as STERLING and 925 and possibly a maker's mark, though rarely with any indication of the date of manufacture. However date marks can be found on match safes made by the celebrated maker Gorham. Early American silversmiths and silverplate manufacturers often stamped match safes with pseudo marks, i.e. fictitious or decorative stamps that mimicked official European, especially English, hallmarks.

== Vesta characteristics ==
A distinguishing characteristic of vesta cases is that they have a ribbed surface, usually on the bottom, for lighting the matches.

Decorations were often engraved into metal vestas (with floreate patterns the most common), though other techniques were sometimes used, including repoussé and chasing, guilloché, engine turning, cloisonné, cold-painting, enamelling and niello. Many vestas had cartouches in a central position on the front for the engraving of initials etc.

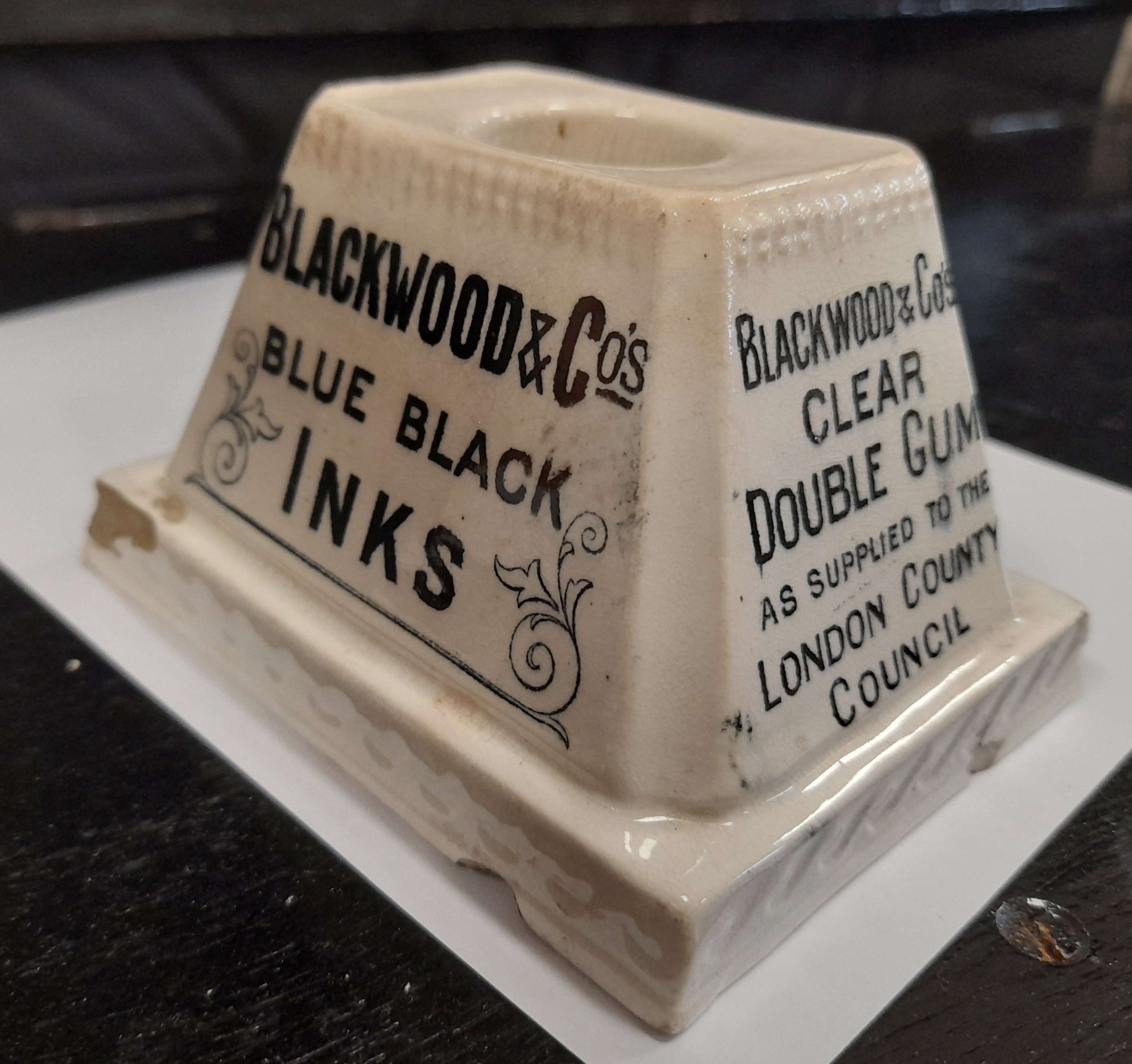
C19th ceramic table vesta advertising Blackwood's inks and gum.

Promotional vestas were sometimes produced by different companies, for example, the Gillette company produced a brass razor blade case with a ribbed bottom that could be used as a vesta case after the razor blades had been used, and Veuve Cliquot produced a vesta in the shape of a champagne bottle. Some vestas were produced as mementos for tourists and others were produced to commemorate important events, such as the death of Queen Victoria.

Sometimes, pocket vesta cases were combined with other items or had other functions incorporated, e.g. a cigar cutter, sovereign holder, small cutting knife, stamp case or compass.

== Collecting vestas ==
Vesta cases are highly collectable and can still to be found in a vast array of shapes, sizes and materials. Prices vary considerably depending on a broad range of factors, including the material of manufacture, maker, condition, age, design, rarity and subject matter. Because of their collectability and the prices that some forms can command, fakes and replicas can be found, sometimes even in reputable antique shops.
