= GMR Marketing =

American advertising agency

GMR Marketing LLC
- Company type: Subsidiary
- Industry: Marketing agency
- Founded: 1979
- Headquarters: New Berlin, Wisconsin, U.S.
- Number of locations: 25 locations in 12 countries (2010)
- Key people: Gary M. Reynolds, Chairman Cameron Parsons, CEO
- Number of employees: 1,300+ (2019)
- Parent: Omnicom Group

GMR Marketing is an advertising agency in New Berlin, Wisconsin, United States.

The firm was founded in 1979 by Gary M. Reynolds. Reynolds stepped down as CEO in 2014 but remains chairman of GMR Marketing. The firm has been a subsidiary of the Omnicom Group since 1997.

In 2015 and 2016, GMR Marketing's headquarters in New Berlin, Wisconsin was listed by the Milwaukee Journal Sentinel as one of the "Best Places to Work".
