= Gladstone, Michigan =

- City
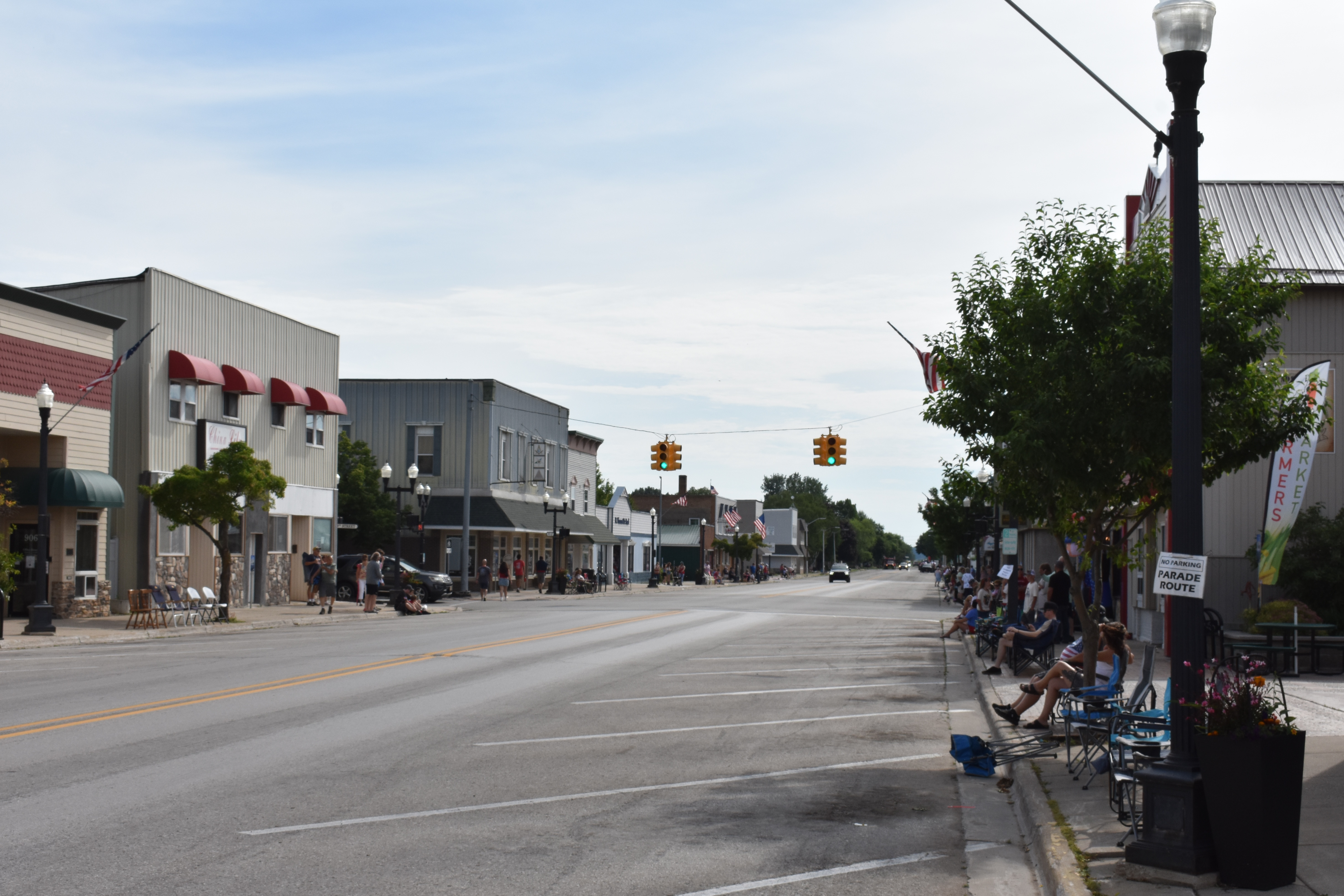
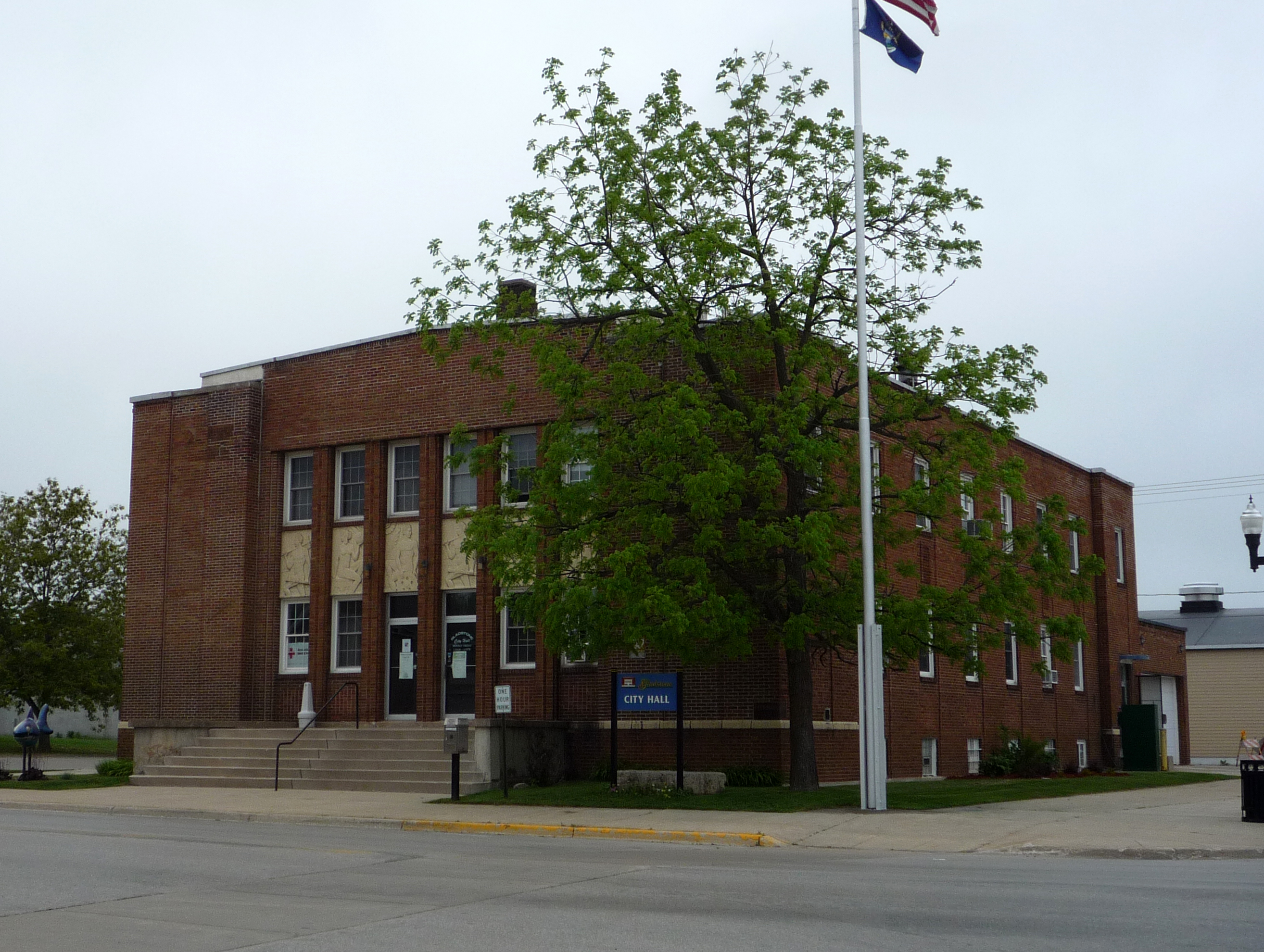
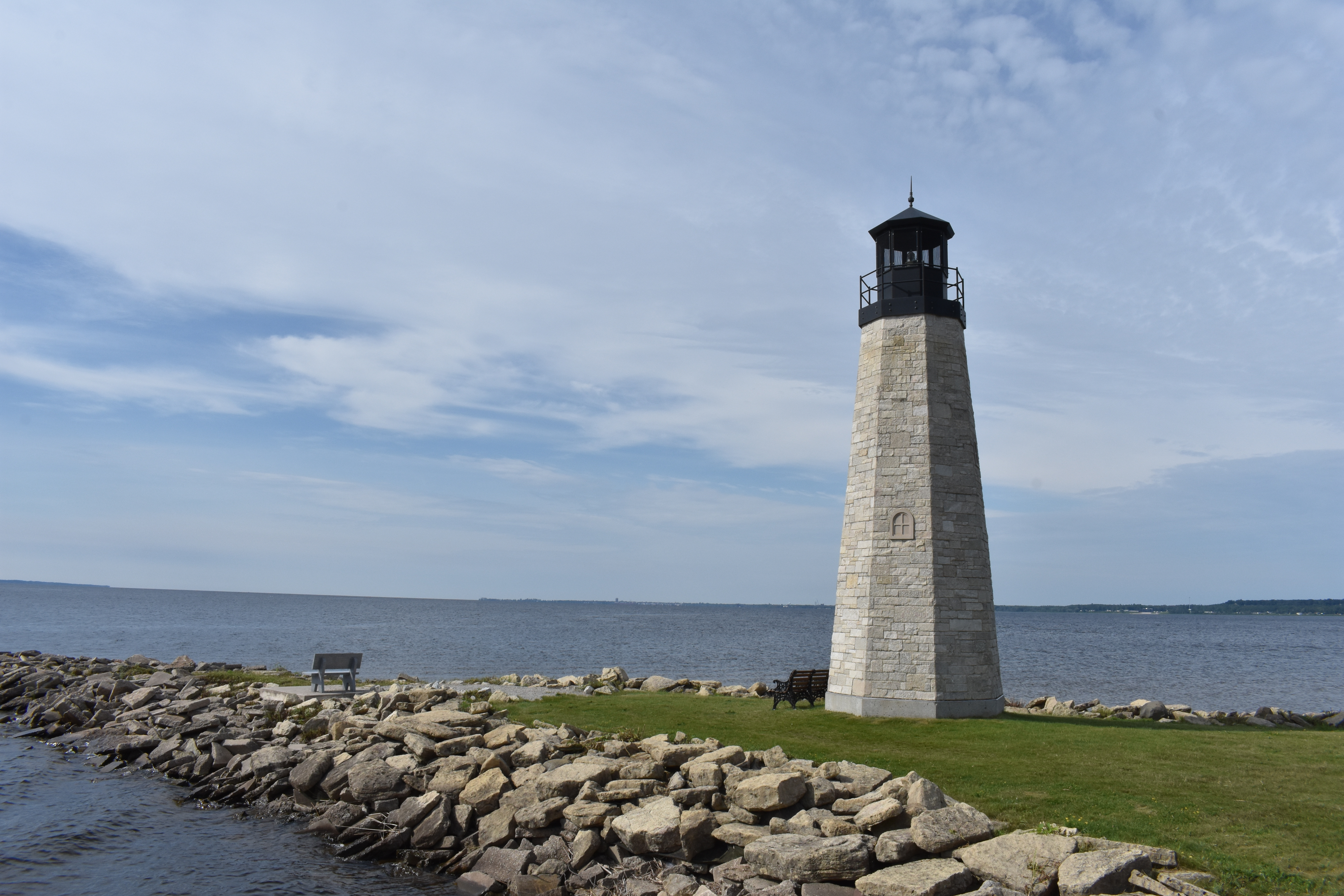
- Downtown Gladstone Gladstone City Hall Gladstone Lighthouse

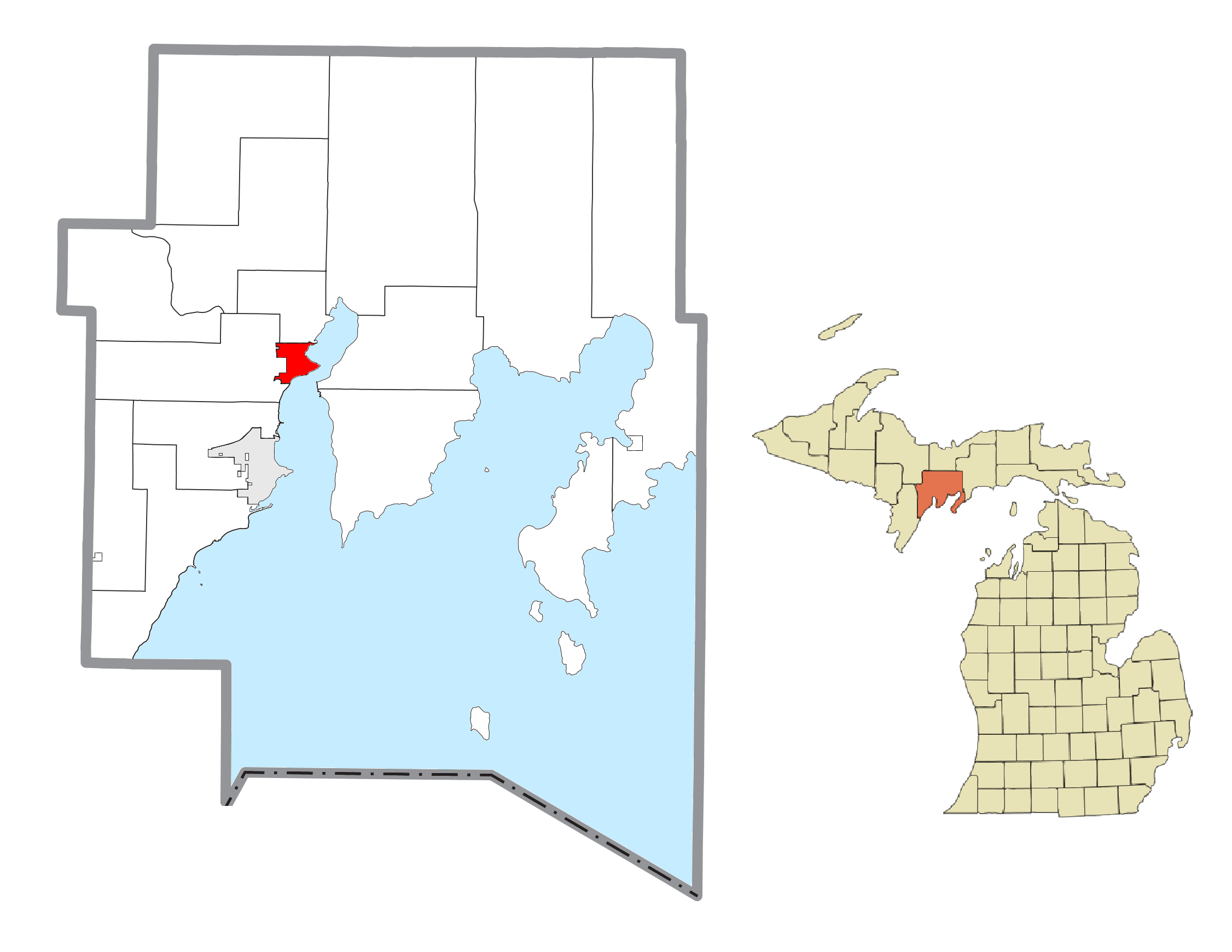
- Location within Delta County

- Location within the state of Michigan
- Coordinates: 45°50′45″N 87°01′49″W
- Country: United States
- State: Michigan
- County: Delta
- Incorporated: 1887 (village); 1889 (city)

Government
  - Type: City commission
  - Mayor: Braden Sundquist

Area
  - Total: 7.99 sq mi (20.69 km^{2})
  - Land: 5.07 sq mi (13.12 km^{2})
  - Water: 2.92 sq mi (7.57 km^{2})
- Elevation: 604 ft (184 m)

Population (2020)
  - Total: 5,257
  - Density: 1,037.7/sq mi (400.67/km^{2})
- Time zone: UTC-5 (Eastern (EST))
  - Summer (DST): UTC-4 (EDT)
- ZIP code(s): 49837
- Area code: 906
- FIPS code: 26-32300
- GNIS feature ID: 1620021
- Website: Official website

Gladstone is a city in Delta County in the Upper Peninsula of the U.S. state of Michigan. First settled in 1877, Gladstone's original name was Minnewasca. The population was 5,257 according to the 2020 census, The U.S. Highways 2 and 41 run concurrently through the city, connecting it to various other communities in the Upper Peninsula of Michigan. The city of Escanaba lies roughly 14 km (9 mi) to the south.

== History ==
=== Initial settlement ===
The first people to occupy the Upper Peninsula of Michigan were Algonquin speaking peoples.

Gladstone was first settled by European descendants in 1859 when the Hamilton Corporation of Fayette began using it as a shipping port for selling and transporting iron ore. The earliest development was located along Saunder's Point, a small peninsula extending into Little Bay De Noc. The peninsula was named for Captain Nate Saunders who headquartered there while fishing at various points along the bay.

=== Change from shipping port to rail hub ===
Throughout the 1860s and early 1870s, Gladstone expanded to become a shipping point for lumber, coal, and copper, in addition to iron ore.

In 1876, the mine operated by the Hamilton Corporation was depleted, and the company moved their operations to a new mine further south. As a result, more ore began to be shipped out of Escanaba. Gladstone's role shifted to that of a rail hub, as Arthur Delano, the president of Soo Line Railroad, had commissioned a train depot built in Saunder's Point during the previous winter to start land shipping for the Hamilton Corporation.

Gladstone was incorporated as a village in 1887 and as a city in 1889.

=== Name change ===
The town was originally named Minnewasca by the Soo Line Railroad, an Ojibwa word meaning "white water." When the name was filed with the county and Secretary of State in Lansing, however, Senator W. D. Washburn, who had an interest in building the railroad, persuaded officials to change the name to Gladstone in honor of British Premier William Ewart Gladstone.

== Geography ==
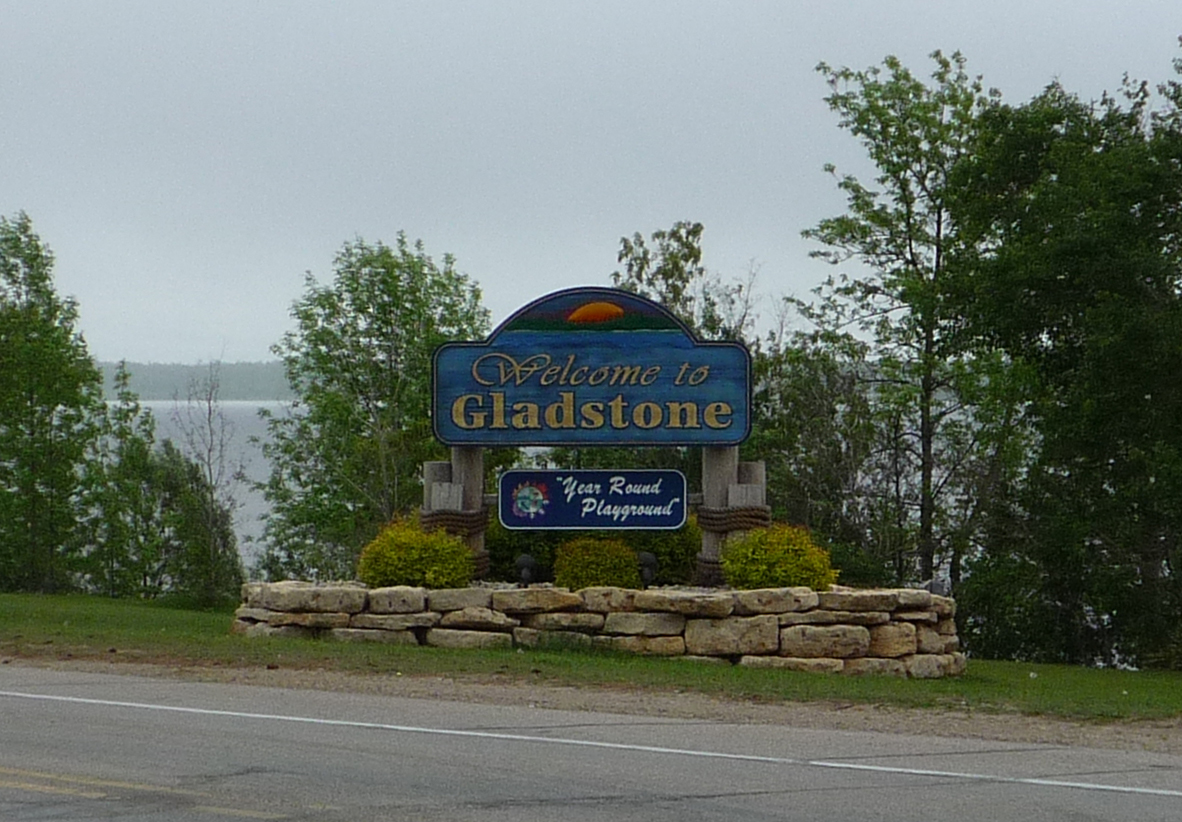
Welcome sign with Little Bay de Noc in the background

The city is located on a small projection into the Little Bay de Noc, which opens onto Green Bay on Lake Michigan.

According to the United States Census Bureau, the city has a total area of 7.92 square miles (20.51 km^{2}), of which 5.00 square miles (12.95 km^{2}) is land and 2.92 square miles (7.56 km^{2}) is water.

=== Neighborhoods ===
Although Gladstone is a relatively small city, it has several distinct sections: Downtown (which hosts most of the local businesses), the Buckeye (located on the western side of the city, bordering the Brampton, MI township), and the Bluff (which hosts most of the new residential expansion, as well as Gladstone High School). Gladstone High School sports teams are referred to as the Braves, which along with the Escanaba Eskymos give Delta County two schools bearing indigenous symbols.

=== Climate ===
Gladstone has a humid continental climate, with cold winters and warm summers. The average temperature in January is around 16 °F (-9 °C). Gladstone receives an average of 36 inches of snow and 33 inches of rainfall per year.

According to the National Weather Service, Gladstone's record low was -60 °F on January 7, 1896. To this day, this storm is referred to by Gladstone residents as "les morte a doigts," since so many of the city's residents lost fingers due to frostbite. On July 19, 1992, Gladstone experienced a rare tornado which caused moderate damage throughout the city.

Gladstone

Climate chart (precipitation, max. and min. temperature)
J	F	M	A	M	J	J	A	S	O	N	D
63 −7 −14	52 −8 −15	55 −1 −8	78 9 −1	63 16 4	91 19 11	113 24 15	74 23 15	118 19 13	118 10 3	104 3 −2	64 −5 −10
- █ Average max. and min. temperatures in °C
- █ Precipitation totals in mm
Imperial conversion
J	F	M	A	M	J	J	A	S	O	N	D
2.5 19 7	2 18 5	2.2 30 18	3.1 48 30	2.5 61 39	3.6 66 52	4.4 75 59	2.9 73 59	4.6 66 55	4.6 50 37	4.1 37 28	2.5 23 14
- █ Average max. and min. temperatures in °F
- █ Precipitation totals in inches

== Culture ==
=== Tourism and parks ===
Gladstone is often referred to as "The Year Round Playground" because of its myriad of parks and activities. Van Cleve Park hosts a playground (Kid's Kingdom), a skateboarding park, baseball field, basketball court, fitness trail, a white sand beach with a water slide, boardwalk, as well as a harbor with boat ramps and a fish cleaning station.

Gladstone also offers The Gladstone Golf Course which winds through the Upper Peninsula Forest, crossing water on 6 of 18 holes.

Another Gladstone attraction is the Gladstone Sports Park, which hosts several baseball fields, skiing and snowboarding runs and a tubing facility. The Park itself is often rented out for other activities, including wedding receptions, and high school graduation parties.

Gladstone hosts the Days River Trails, which are hiked and biked in the spring, summer, and fall. In the winter, these trails are used primarily for cross-country skiing.

=== Media ===
Gladstone was featured in the 2010 documentary film Catfish.

== Transportation ==
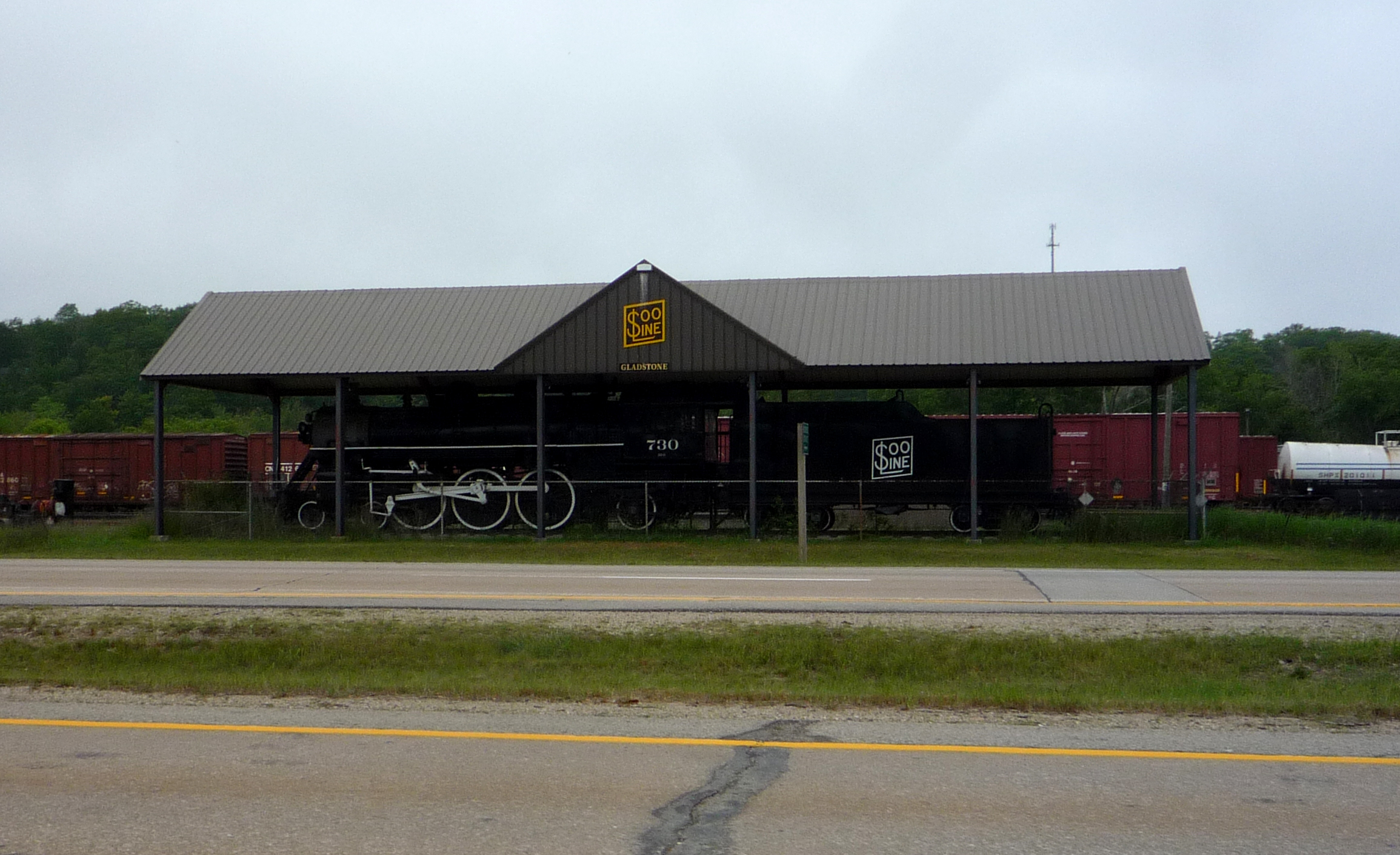
Soo Line locomotive 4-6-2 Pacific H-3 (730) sits off of US 2.

- US 2 exists in two discontinuous segments, with the western portion running from Everett, Washington and through Gladstone before ending at Interstate 75 in St. Ignace, Michigan. The eastern portion runs from Rouses Point, New York to Houlton, Maine, with a total of 2,571 miles between the two segments.
- US 41 runs 2,000 miles from east of Copper Harbor, Michigan, at a modest cul-de-sac near Fort Wilkins Historic State Park at the tip of the Keweenaw Peninsula in Michigan's Upper Peninsula, through Gladstone, and on to the Brickell neighborhood of Downtown Miami.
- M-35
- Indian Trails provides daily intercity bus service between St. Ignace and Ironwood, Michigan and between Hancock and Milwaukee with a stop in Gladstone.

== Notable people ==
- Terry Ahola, professional ski racer, member of US Ski Team
- Robert John Cornell, former member of the United States House of Representatives from Wisconsin, and a Roman Catholic priest
- Becky Iverson, professional golfer
- Frank Smith, cartoon animator and film director
- Bart Stupak, former member of the United States House of Representatives, Upper Peninsula of Michigan
- Kevin Tapani, professional baseball pitcher

== Demographics ==
Historical population
Census	Pop.	Note	%±
1890	1,337		—
1900	3,380		152.8%
1910	4,211		24.6%
1920	4,953		17.6%
1930	5,170		4.4%
1940	4,972		−3.8%
1950	4,831		−2.8%
1960	5,267		9.0%
1970	5,237		−0.6%
1980	4,533		−13.4%
1990	4,565		0.7%
2000	5,032		10.2%
2010	4,973		−1.2%
2020	5,257		5.7%
U.S. Decennial Census

=== 2020 census ===
As of the 2020 census, Gladstone had a population of 5,257. The median age was 44.8 years. 21.3% of residents were under the age of 18 and 23.7% of residents were 65 years of age or older. For every 100 females there were 95.6 males, and for every 100 females age 18 and over there were 92.1 males age 18 and over.

There were 1,272 families residing in the city, and the population density was 1,037.70 inhabitants per square mile (400.67/km^{2}).

93.5% of residents lived in urban areas, while 6.5% lived in rural areas.

There were 2,297 households in Gladstone, of which 24.6% had children under the age of 18 living in them. Of all households, 45.5% were married-couple households, 19.6% were households with a male householder and no spouse or partner present, and 27.8% were households with a female householder and no spouse or partner present. About 34.8% of all households were made up of individuals and 17.4% had someone living alone who was 65 years of age or older.

There were 2,546 housing units, of which 9.8% were vacant. The homeowner vacancy rate was 2.6% and the rental vacancy rate was 4.1%.

Racial composition as of the 2020 census
Race	Number	Percent
White	4,828	91.8%
Black or African American	6	0.1%
American Indian and Alaska Native	68	1.3%
Asian	15	0.3%
Native Hawaiian and Other Pacific Islander	0	0.0%
Some other race	28	0.5%
Two or more races	312	5.9%
Hispanic or Latino (of any race)	85	1.6%

=== 2010 census ===
As of the census of 2010, there were 4,973 people, 2,182 households, and 1,374 families residing in the city. The population density was 994.6 inhabitants per square mile (384.0/km^{2}). There were 2,431 housing units at an average density of 486.2 per square mile (187.7/km^{2}). The racial makeup of the city was 95.4% White, 0.2% African American, 1.9% Native American, 0.3% Asian, 0.3% from other races, and 1.8% from two or more races. Hispanic or Latino of any race were 1.0% of the population.

There were 2,182 households, of which 27.9% had children under the age of 18 living with them, 49.5% were married couples living together, 9.3% had a female householder with no husband present, 4.1% had a male householder with no wife present, and 37.0% were non-families. 32.4% of all households were made up of individuals, and 17.4% had someone living alone who was 65 years of age or older. The average household size was 2.27 and the average family size was 2.84.

The median age in the city was 43.6 years. 22.7% of residents were under the age of 18; 6.5% were between the ages of 18 and 24; 22.3% were from 25 to 44; 27.5% were from 45 to 64; and 21.1% were 65 years of age or older. The gender makeup of the city was 47.7% male and 52.3% female.

=== 2000 census ===
As of the census of 2000, there were 5,032 people, 2,126 households, and 1,392 families residing in the city. The population density was 1,015.2 inhabitants per square mile (392.0/km^{2}). There were 2,289 housing units at an average density of 461.8 per square mile (178.3/km^{2}). The racial makeup of the city was 96.76% White, 0.14% African American, 1.47% Native American, 0.22% Asian, 0.08% Pacific Islander, 0.04% from other races, and 1.29% from two or more races. Hispanic or Latino of any race were 0.42% of the population. 14.3% were of French, 14.0% German, 12.2% Swedish, 10.3% French Canadian, 6.1% English, 5.2% Irish and 5.0% Belgian ancestry according to Census 2000. 99.5% spoke English as their first language.

There were 2,126 households, out of which 29.7% had children under the age of 18 living with them, 52.6% were married couples living together, 9.9% had a female householder with no husband present, and 34.5% were non-families. 30.8% of all households were made up of individuals, and 16.1% had someone living alone who was 65 years of age or older. The average household size was 2.36 and the average family size was 2.94.

In the city, the population was spread out, with 24.9% under the age of 18, 7.3% from 18 to 24, 25.7% from 25 to 44, 23.1% from 45 to 64, and 19.0% who were 65 years of age or older. The median age was 40 years. For every 100 females, there were 90.6 males. For every 100 females aged 18 and over, there were 87.6 males.

The median income for a household in the city was $34,328, and the median income for a family was $47,899. Males had a median income of $43,400 versus $25,662 for females. The per capita income for the city was $17,973. About 7.8% of families and 10.2% of the population were below the poverty line, including 13.9% of those under age 18 and 9.5% of those age 65 or over.
