= Webb =

Webb may refer to:

== Places ==
=== Antarctica ===
- Webb Glacier (South Georgia)
- Webb Glacier (Victoria Land)
- Webb Névé, Victoria Land, the névé at the head of Seafarer Glacier
- Webb Nunataks, a group of nunataks in the Neptune Range
- Webb Peak (disambiguation)

=== Canada ===
- Rural Municipality of Webb No. 138, Saskatchewan
  - Webb, Saskatchewan, a village within the rural municipality

=== United States ===
- Webb, Alabama, a town
- Webb, Iowa, a city
- Webb Lake (Maine)
- Webb River, Maine
- Webb Memorial State Park, Massachusetts
- Webb, Mississippi, a town
- Webb City, Missouri, a city
- Webb City, Oklahoma, a town
- Webb, New York, a town
- Webb, Texas, an unincorporated community
- Webb County, Texas
- Webb Air Force Base, near Big Spring, Texas
- Webb Hill, Utah
- Webb, West Virginia, an unincorporated community
- Webb Canyon, Grand Teton National Park, Wyoming

=== The Moon ===
- Webb (crater)

== Things ==
- CSS Webb, a Confederate States Navy steam ram in the American Civil War
- James Webb Space Telescope

== Other uses ==
- Webb (given name)
- Webb (surname)
- Webb Marlowe, pseudonym of J. Francis McComas
- Webb Institute, Glen Cove, New York, US
- Webb, a house of Adams' Grammar School, Newport, Shropshire, UK

== See also ==
- Justice Webb (disambiguation)
- Jervis B. Webb Company
- Mount Webb National Park, Queensland
- Web (disambiguation)
- Webb and Knapp, a development company
- Webb House (disambiguation)
- The Webb School (disambiguation)
- Webb v. United States, a Supreme Court case
- Webbe
