= National Register of Historic Places listings in Florence County, Wisconsin =

Location of Florence County in Wisconsin

This is a list of the National Register of Historic Places listings in Florence County, Wisconsin. It is intended to provide a comprehensive listing of entries in the National Register of Historic Places that are located in Florence County, Wisconsin. The locations of National Register properties for which the latitude and longitude coordinates are included below may be seen in a map.

There are 7 properties and districts listed on the National Register in the county. Another property was once listed but has been removed.

This National Park Service list is complete through NPS recent listings posted March 21, 2025.

== Current listings ==
	Name on the Register	Image	Date listed	Location	City or town	Description
1	Fay Outlet Site (47FL13)	Fay Outlet Site (47FL13)	January 17, 1989 (#88000647)	Address Restricted	Long Lake	Woodland/Oneota village site.
2	Fern School	Fern School	March 20, 1981 (#81000043)	SW of Florence on WI 101; 45°50′10″N 88°23′11″W	Florence	One to six room school, built in 1921 in Colonial Revival style.
3	Florence County Courthouse and Jail	Florence County Courthouse and Jail	December 2, 1985 (#85003029)	501 Lake St. 45°55′16″N 88°14′56″W	Florence	1897 courthouse built in Romanesque Revival style of sandstone and limestone.
4	Florence Town Hall	Florence Town Hall	April 15, 2014 (#14000169)	748 Central Ave. 45°55′21″N 88°15′07″W	Florence	Town hall with public auditorium designed by Max Hanisch, Sr. in Art Moderne style and built in 1936.
5	David M. and Lottie Fulmer House	David M. and Lottie Fulmer House	May 5, 2014 (#14000196)	209 Central Ave. 45°55′19″N 88°14′44″W	Florence	2-story, stucco-clad Prairie School house built in 1899. Along with the Fulmers, it was owned by Max Sells, a Florence attorney.
6	Upper Twin Falls Bridge	Upper Twin Falls Bridge	December 12, 2012 (#12001028)	Over the Menominee River; 45°52′39″N 88°04′43″W	Florence	Highway bridge, built 1910-11 to Dickinson County, Michigan because the Twin Falls Power Dam would soon flood the previous bridge. One of two pin-connected, camelback, through-truss bridges remaining in Wisconsin. Site of liquor inspections from 1914-20, when Michigan was dry and Wisconsin wet.
7	Robert B. and Estelle J. Webb House	Robert B. and Estelle J. Webb House	May 5, 2014 (#14000197)	200 Central Ave. 45°55′21″N 88°14′42″W	Florence	Queen Anne-styled home built in 1883 with bargeboards and elaborate porches. Robert was involved in mining and ran a hardware store in Florence.

== See also ==
- List of National Historic Landmarks in Wisconsin
- National Register of Historic Places listings in Wisconsin
- Listings in neighboring counties: Dickinson (MI), Forest, Iron (MI), Marinette
