= National Register of Historic Places listings in Marinette County, Wisconsin =

Location of Marinette County in Wisconsin

This is a list of the National Register of Historic Places listings in Marinette County, Wisconsin. It is intended to provide a comprehensive listing of entries in the National Register of Historic Places that are located in Marinette County, Wisconsin. The locations of National Register properties for which the latitude and longitude coordinates are included below may be seen in a map.

There are 14 properties and districts listed on the National Register in the county.

This National Park Service list is complete through NPS recent listings posted March 21, 2025.

== Current listings ==
	Name on the Register	Image	Date listed	Location	City or town	Description
1	Amberg Town Hall	Amberg Town Hall	March 20, 1981 (#81000048)	One third mile off U.S. 141 on County V. 45°30′09″N 87°59′40″W	Amberg	Designed by Charles Maass of Marinette in Queen Anne style and built in 1894, the hall housed a jail, a clerk's office and a community hall used for live entertainers, Christmas plays, meetings, dances and basketball games.
2	Anaem Omot		June 20, 2023 (#100009086)	Address Restricted; 45°28′00″N 87°49′00″W	Wausaukee vicinity	Anaem Omot is on the border of Menominee County, Michigan and Marinette County, Wisconsin, and is listed in both counties.
3	Bijou Theatre Building	Bijou Theatre Building	March 11, 1993 (#93000159)	1722-1726 Main St. 45°05′58″N 87°37′47″W	Marinette	Classical Revival building built in 1905 as a department store and vaudeville theater for Frank Lauerman. As vaudeville succumbed to motion pictures, it was converted to a movie theater.
4	Mary and Harry Brown House	Mary and Harry Brown House	October 5, 2015 (#15000713)	1931 Riverside Ave. 45°06′08″N 87°37′57″W	Marinette	Lumber baron and Senator Isaac Stephenson had this house along the Menominee River built in 1885 in Queen Anne style for his daughter Mary. In the 1920s it was remodelled to the then-more-fashionable Tudor Revival style.
5	Chautauqua Grounds Site	Chautauqua Grounds Site	April 29, 1997 (#97000367)	Address Restricted	Marinette	An archaeological site of the Old Copper Culture.
6	Dunlap Square Building	Dunlap Square Building	February 24, 1992 (#92000026)	1821 Hall St. 45°05′58″N 87°37′55″W	Marinette	This Queen Anne styled business block built from 1890 to 1902 has housed a drug store, a saloon, a telephone exchange, restaurants, shops, and various offices.
7	Independent Order of Odd Fellows-Lodge No. 189 Building	Independent Order of Odd Fellows-Lodge No. 189 Building	January 7, 1999 (#98001597)	1335 Main St. 45°05′42″N 87°37′18″W	Marinette	Two-story brick Odd Fellows lodge built in 1889.
8	Lena Road School	Lena Road School	April 26, 2002 (#02000415)	N2155 US 141; 45°02′19″N 88°02′42″W	Pound	Simple, classic one-room school built by local farmers in 1911 and used as a school until 1959.
9	Lauerman Brothers Department Store	Lauerman Brothers Department Store	February 24, 1992 (#92000027)	1701-1721 Dunlap Sq. 45°05′58″N 87°37′51″W	Marinette	The flagship of a multi-state chain of department stores based in Marinette. Complex includes the early Italianate-styled business block, the department store built from 1904 to 1924 designed in Chicago Commercial style, and the warehouse built in 1920.
10	F.J. Lauerman House	F.J. Lauerman House	August 14, 1979 (#79000094)	383 State St. 45°06′00″N 87°38′21″W	Marinette	Spanish Colonial Revival-styled home built in 1901 for Frank Lauerman of the department store, and called Casa del Flores.
11	Milwaukee Road Depot	Milwaukee Road Depot	January 12, 2005 (#04001485)	650 Hattie St. 45°05′55″N 87°38′17″W	Marinette	Stick style depot built in 1903 by the Milwaukee Road, originally with a women's waiting room on one end and men's on the other.
12	Peshtigo Fire Cemetery	Peshtigo Fire Cemetery	October 15, 1970 (#70000037)	Oconto Ave. between Peck and Ellis Aves. 45°03′23″N 87°45′15″W	Peshtigo	Graves of victims of the fire of 1871, including a mass grave of 300 men, women and children who could not be identified.
13	Peshtigo Reef Light	Peshtigo Reef Light	May 2, 2007 (#07000404)	Offshore in lower Green Bay, approx. 3.3 mi (5.3 km). SE of Peshtigo Point; 44°57′31″N 87°34′48″W	Peshtigo Township	Lighthouse built in 1936 to warn ships of the shoal which runs out three miles from the mouth of the Peshtigo River. A daymark marked the shoal from 1869 to 1906 and a lightship from then to 1936. (ARLHS USA 951)
14	Sidney O. Neff Shipwreck (steambarge)	Sidney O. Neff Shipwreck (steambarge)	November 7, 2022 (#100008394)	.35 mi. southwest of the Marinette Harbor entrance in Green Bay; 45°05′31″N 87°34′37″W	Marinette vicinity	150 feet (45.7 m) wood-hulled two-masted schooner-barge built in 1890 in Manitowoc by Burger & Berger for S. Neff & Sons to be towed to haul lumber by the steamer St. Joseph. After various sales and rebuilds, by the time it was scuttled in 1940, it was one of the last wooden commercial ships on the Great Lakes.

== See also ==
- List of National Historic Landmarks in Wisconsin
- National Register of Historic Places listings in Wisconsin
- Listings in neighboring counties: Dickinson (MI), Florence, Forest, Menominee (MI), Oconto
