= Webb House =

Webb House may refer to:

== In the United States ==
(by state)

- William Peter Webb House, Eutaw, Alabama, listed on the National Register of Historic Places (NRHP) in Greene County
- Joe and Nina Webb House, Conway, Arkansas, listed on the NRHP in Faulkner County
- John Lee Webb House in Pleasant Street Historic District (Hot Springs, Arkansas)
- David Jr. and Sarah Webb House, New Canaan, Connecticut, listed on the NRHP in Fairfield County
- Joseph Webb House, Wethersfield, Connecticut, listed on the NRHP in Hartford County
- Webb Family Farm, Sumter, Georgia, listed on the NRHP in Sumter County
- John Webb House, Anchorage, Kentucky, listed on the NRHP in Jefferson County
- Webb House (Paintsville, Kentucky), listed on the NRHP in Johnson County
- Byrd and Leona Webb House, Paintsville, Kentucky, listed on the NRHP in Johnson County
- Norton-Webb House, Oak Bluffs, Massachusetts
- George Webb House, Liberty, Mississippi, listed on the NRHP in Amite County
- Lewis-Webb House, Independence, Missouri, listed on the NRHP in Jackson County
- Webb-Barron-Wells House, Elm City, North Carolina, listed on the NRHP in Wilson County
- Alfred Webb Investment Properties, Portland, Oregon, listed on the NRHP in Multnomah County
- Webb-Coleman House, Chappells, South Carolina, listed on the NRHP in Saluda County
- Parks Place, College Grove, Tennessee, also known as the William Felix Webb House, NRHP-listed
- McGavock-Gatewood-Webb House, Nashville, Tennessee, listed on the NRHP in Davidson County
- James Webb House, Triune, Tennessee, listed on the NRHP in Williamson County
- Boardman-Webb-Bugg House, Austin, Texas, listed on the NRHP in Travis County
- Thomas and Mary Webb House, Lehi, Utah, listed on the NRHP in Utah County
- S. Milton and Alba C. Webb House, Richmond, Utah, listed on the NRHP in Cache County
- Robert B. and Estelle J. Webb House, Florence, Wisconsin, listed on the NRHP in Florence County

== In the United Kingdom ==
- One of the houses in Haberdashers' Adams, Newport, Shropshire, England
- Headquarters of Ahmadi Religion of Peace and Light, in Crewe, Cheshire, England
