= Florence, Wisconsin =

Florence, Wisconsin may refer to:

- Florence (CDP), Wisconsin, a census-designated place in and the county seat of Florence County
- Florence (town), Wisconsin, a town in Florence County
