= Wisconsin Highway 101 =

State highway in Wisconsin, United States

State Trunk Highway 101
- WIS 101 highlighted in red

Route information
- Maintained by WisDOT
- Length: 23.54 mi (37.88 km)

Major junctions
- South end: US 8 in Armstrong Creek
- North end: US 2 / US 141 / WIS 70 in Florence

Location
- Country: United States
- State: Wisconsin
- Counties: Forest, Florence

Highway system
- Wisconsin State Trunk Highway System; Interstate; US; State; Scenic; Rustic
← WIS 100	→ WIS 102

State Trunk Highway 101 (often called Highway 101, STH-101 or WIS 101) is a state highway in the U.S. state of Wisconsin. It runs south–north in northeast Wisconsin from US 8 in Armstrong Creek to WIS 70, US 2 and US 141 in Florence. WIS 101 meets WIS 70 near Keyes Lake, and the two highways run concurrently for 2.4 miles (3.9 km) until their shared terminus. The highway also serves the community of Fence and the areas surrounding the Pine and Popple rivers. WIS 101 is maintained by the Wisconsin Department of Transportation.

== Route description ==
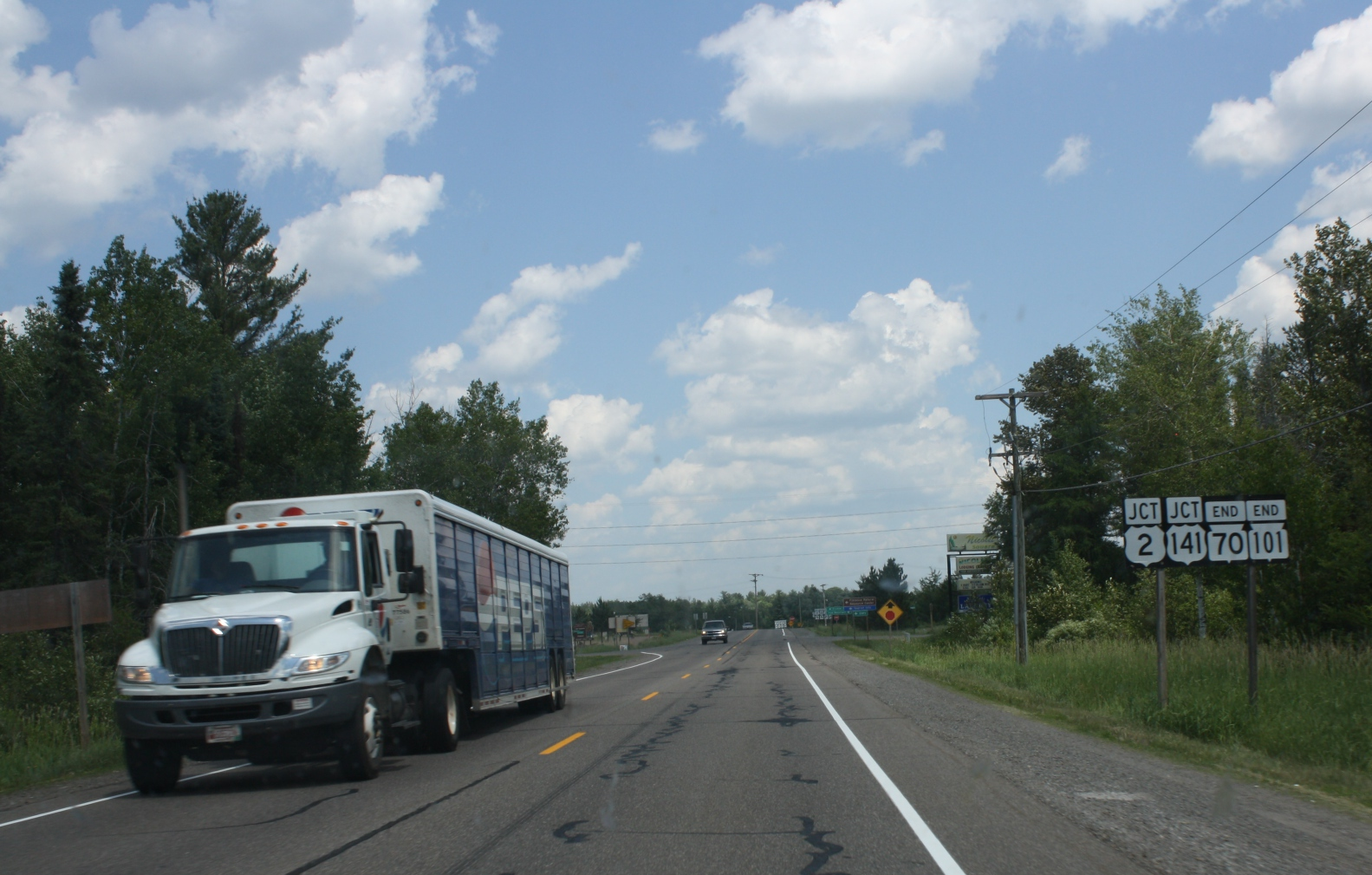
Northern terminus in Florence

WIS 101 begins at a junction with US 8 in Armstrong Creek in eastern Forest County. The highway heads north through the Town of Armstrong Creek, intersecting County Highway F near three lakes. From here the route crosses into Florence County, where it meets County Highway C west of the community of Fence. It continues northward through the forested Town of Fence, crossing the Popple River near a wayside. Past the river, the highway enters the Town of Fern. After running through the community of Fern, the route turns to the east near Price Lake. It turns northward again to pass through a forested area with many lakes, intersecting County Highway D in this area. After passing a county park by Keyes Lake, WIS 101 intersects WIS 70 in the Town of Commonwealth, and the two highways head eastward concurrently. The routes turn northeast into the Town of Florence, where they both terminate at US 2 and US 141 in western Florence.

== Major intersections ==
County	Location	mi	km	Destinations	Notes
Forest	Community of Armstrong Creek	0.0	0.0	US 8 – Laona, Pembine	Southern terminus of WIS 101
Forest	Town of Armstrong Creek	4.2	6.8	CTH-F east	
Florence	Town of Fence	6.4	10.3	CTH-C east	
Florence	Town of Fern	19.3	31.1	CTH-D east	
Florence	Town of Commonwealth	21.2	34.1	WIS 70 west – Eagle River	South end of WIS 70 concurrency
Florence	Community of Florence	23.6	38.0	US 2 / US 141 / WIS 70 ends – Crystal Falls, Iron Mountain	North end of WIS 70 concurrency; northern terminus of WIS 101; eastern terminus of WIS 70
1.000 mi = 1.609 km; 1.000 km = 0.621 mi: Concurrency terminus
