= Kenneth L. Greenquist =

American politician (1910–1968)

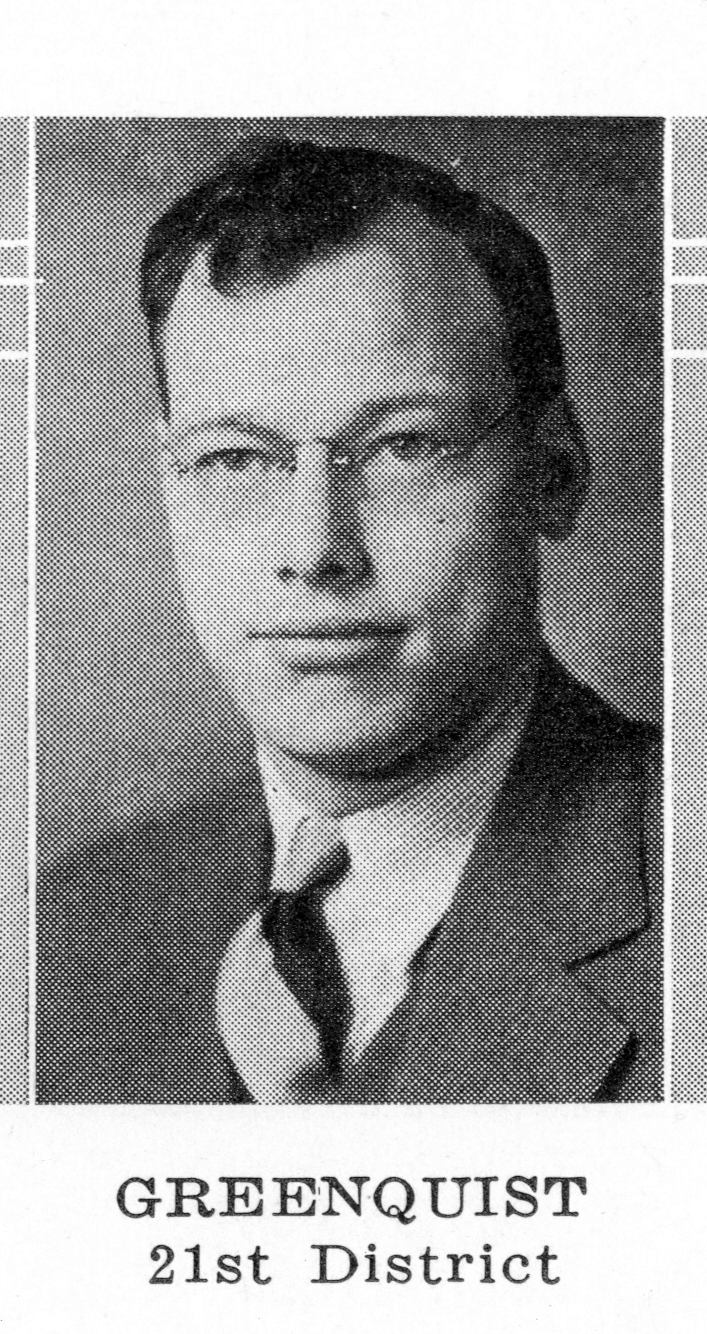

Member of the Wisconsin Senate from the 21st district
- In office January 2, 1939 – January 4, 1943
- Preceded by: Joseph Clancy
- Succeeded by: Edward F. Hilker

Personal details
- Born: April 3, 1910 Florence, Wisconsin
- Died: April 5, 1968 (aged 58) Madison, Wisconsin
- Resting place: Graceland Cemetery; Racine, Wisconsin
- Party: Wisconsin Progressive Party
- Spouses: Hilda K. Greenquist; (m. 1940; died 2005)
- Children: Katherine L. Greenquist; Nancy M. (McCarthy)
- Education: University of Kentucky; University of Wisconsin Law School

Military service
- Allegiance: United States
- Branch/service: United States Navy; U.S. Navy Reserve
- Years of service: 1943–1945
- Rank: Lieutenant, USNR
- Unit: SS Ralph A. Cram
- Battles/wars: World War II

Kenneth L. Greenquist (April 3, 1910 – April 5, 1968) was an American machinist, lawyer, and politician. He represented Racine County in the Wisconsin State Senate for four years as a Wisconsin Progressive, and was President of the University of Wisconsin Board of Regents.

== Early life and education ==
Greenquist was born on April 3, 1910, in Florence, Wisconsin. He graduated from Racine High School in Racine, Wisconsin, before attending the University of Kentucky. He graduated from the University of Wisconsin Law School in 1936.

== Career ==
Greenquist worked as a spot welder assistant with the J. I. Case Company, the Massey-Harris Company, and Modine Manufacturing. After graduating from law school, Greenquist entered a law partnership with Francis Wendt, who would later become Chairman of the Racine City Council.

In 1938, Wendt and Greenquist entered Progressive politics, managing the campaign of city council candidate Casimir Zielkowski. Zielkowski won his election, and, that fall, Greenquist ran for the Wisconsin Senate in the 21st district. Greenquist won the Progressive Party's nomination in the September primary election, and faced incumbent Democrat Joseph Clancy and Republican challenger Fred Ahlgrimm in the general election.

Greenquist won the election and represented Racine County in the Wisconsin Senate for the next four years. As a senator, Greenquist served on the Committee for State and Local Government. In 1941, after the death of Congressman Stephen Bolles, Greenquist ran in the special election to replace him in the 1st Congressional District, but was not successful.

He did not seek re-election in 1942 and instead entered the United States Navy Reserve for service in World War II. He attended officer training in Gulfport, Mississippi, and was then assigned to the Liberty ship Ralph A. Cram, journeying from Brooklyn to Europe, then to the South Pacific.

After the war, Greenquist was appointed City Attorney of Racine and remained in that role until 1949. He remained active as an attorney and activist. In 1957, he successfully argued the case of Maier v. Racine County before the Wisconsin Supreme Court, which found that the county government did not have the authority to set a legal drinking age. The case became a frequently-cited precedent which limited the powers of county boards.

In 1962, Governor John W. Reynolds appointed Greenquist to the Board of Regents of the University of Wisconsin System. He was elected President of the Board of Regents in June 1967.

He died in April 1968, two days after his 58th birthday.

== Family life and legacy ==
Greenquist married Hilda Winger in 1940. They had two daughters together. He died on April 5, 1968, at the University of Wisconsin Hospital and Clinics in Madison.

He served as Commander of the Wisconsin Department of the American Legion in 1952.

Greenquist Hall on the University of Wisconsin–Parkside campus in Kenosha County, Wisconsin, was named for him.
