= William James Webbe =

British painter and illustrator (1830–1904)

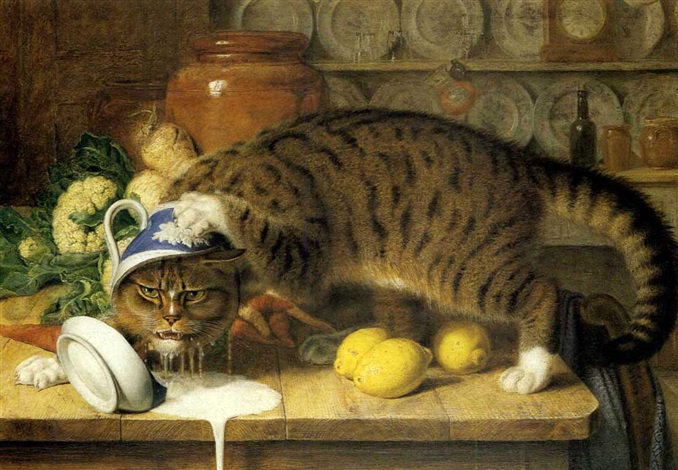
The Collared Thief, 1860

William James Webbe (or Webb) (born 13 July 1830 in Redruth, Cornwall, England – died 1904 in England) was an English Victorian painter and illustrator, known for his rustic, religious, and book paintings. His landscape style in particular links him to the Pre-Raphaelites, and after travelling to the Middle East in 1862 he painted many Biblical subjects in the spirit of Orientalism.

== Life ==
Webbe was born on 13 July 1830 at Redruth, Cornwall, and baptized on the 23rd of that month at St Austell, Cornwall. He was one of eight children of Wesleyan Church minister Rev. Samuel Webb and Sarah née Stirrup. He married Besse before 1871, the couple had two children, Wilfred Mark Webb and Ethel Alice Webb, and lived in London. He travelled abroad, to Dusseldorf, where he study art, where he was probably influenced by Nazarenes art. Webbe returned to England in 1853, and made his debut at the Royal Academy. He took part in exhibitions at the Royal Academy, the British Institution, and the Royal Society of British Artists from 1853 to 1878.

Early works, rustic scenes and animals

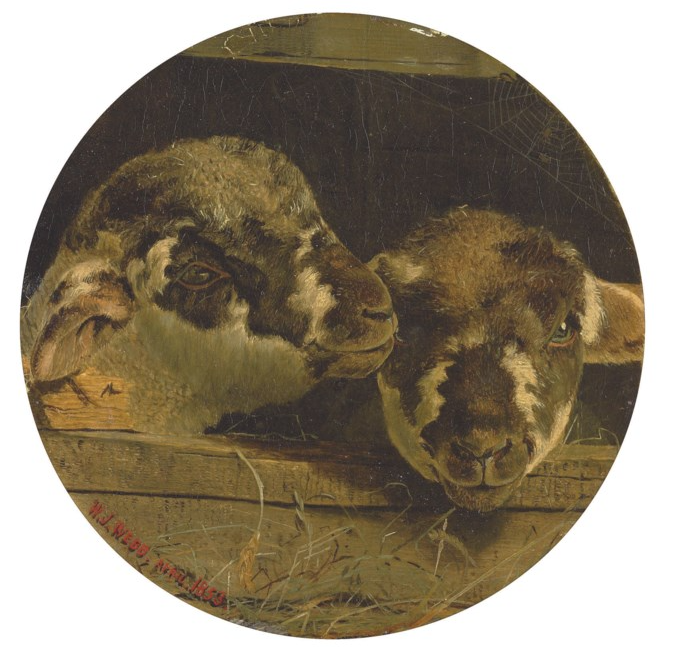
Two lambs in a barn, signed and dated 'W. J. Webb April 1853' (lower left), oil on board

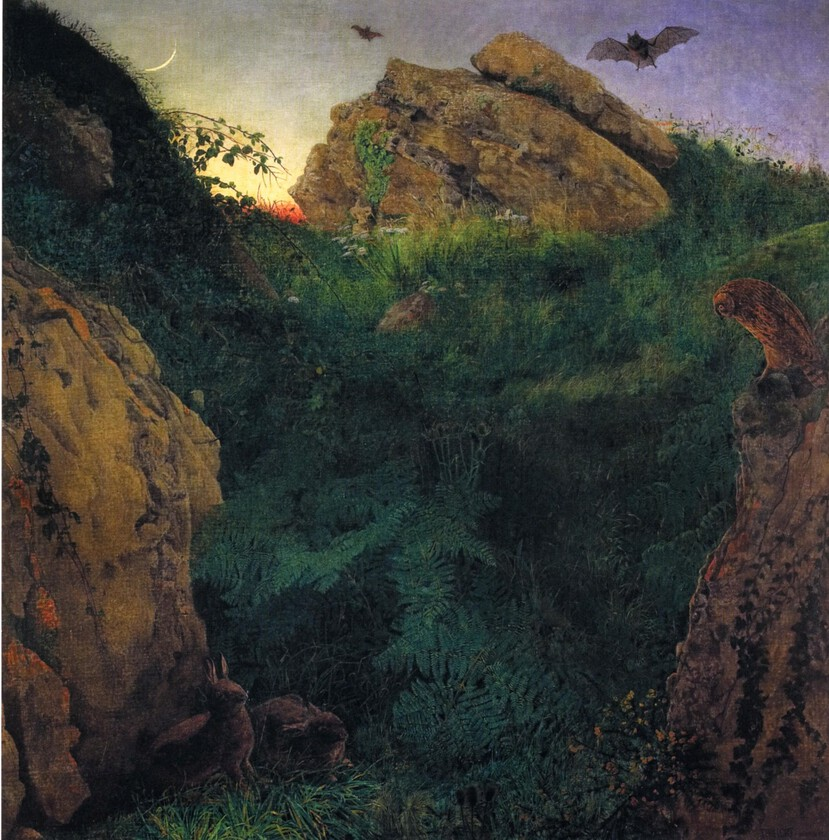
Twilight, c. 1855, oil on canvas

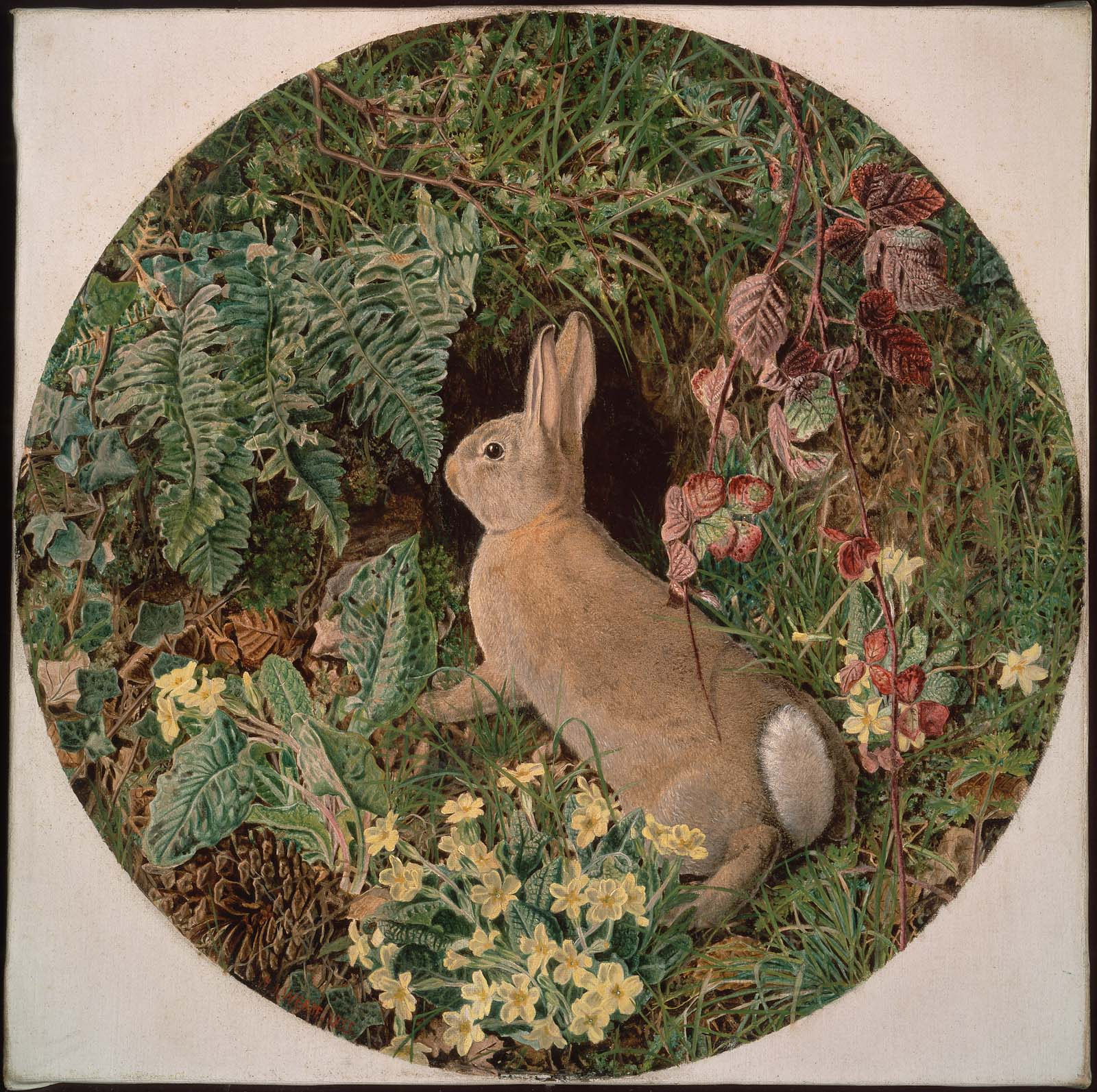
Rabbit amid Ferns and Flowering Plants, 1855

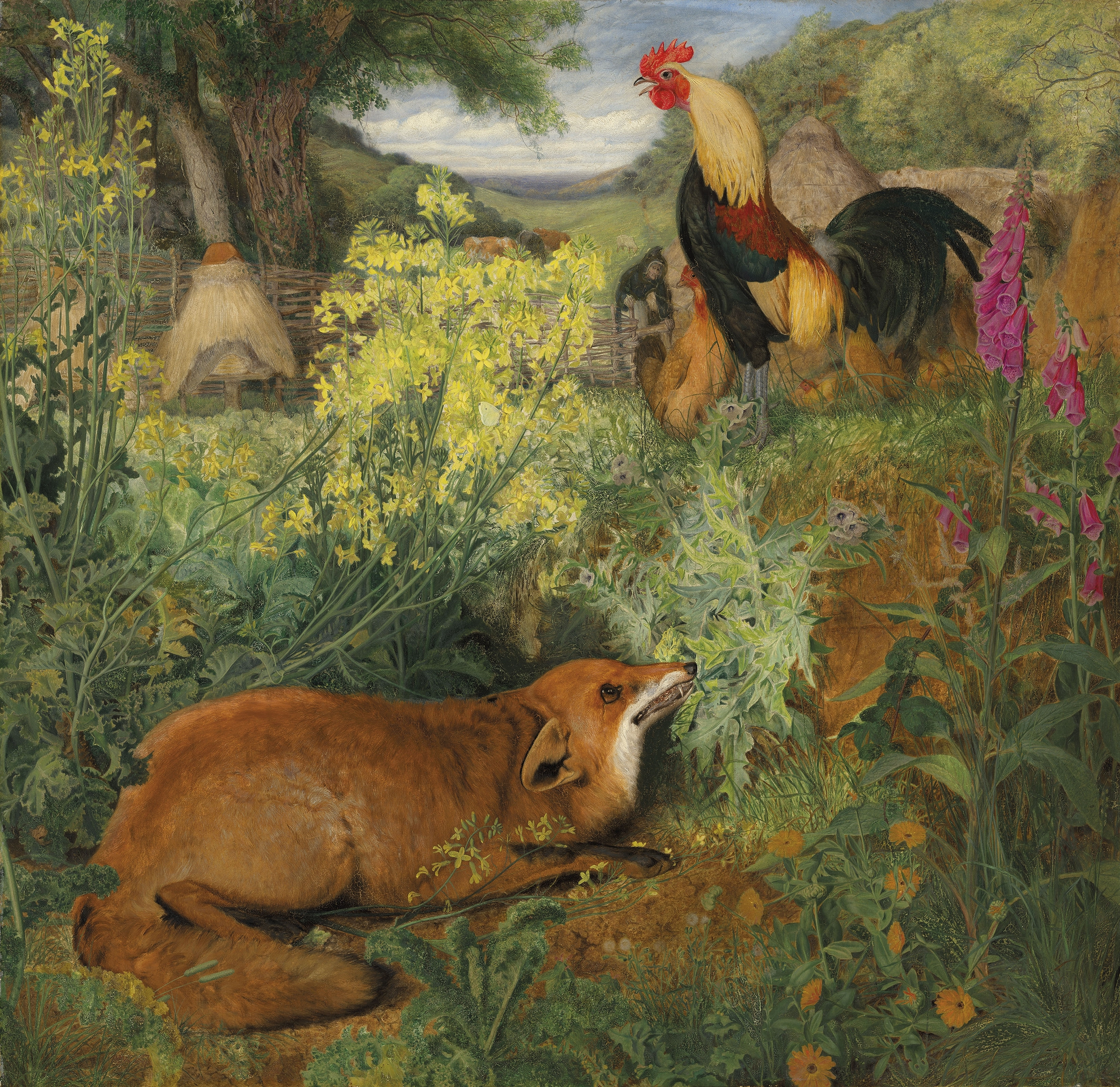
Chanticleer and the Fox, signed with initials and dated 'WJW 1857' (lower left)

Webbe was an early convert to Pre-Raphaelitism. Allen Staley wrote about Webbe in his book The Pre-Raphaelite Landscape (1973), and noted that two of his works dating from 1854–55 are of "Pre-Raphaelite elaboration of microscopic foreground detail pushed to an almost insane extreme". In 1862 Webbe made a pilgrimage to Jerusalem and the Middle East and began to paint Eastern subjects. Webbe's journey was probably inspired by English painter and one of the founders of the Pre-Raphaelite Brotherhood William Holman Hunt, who visited the Holy Land in 1854–1856, 1869–1872, 1875–1878, and 1892.

Webbe is known for his book illustrations for six volumes published by the London publishing house Raphael Tuck & Sons. More of his illustrations can be found in Biblical Stories for Children and in books by authors such as William Makepeace Thackeray and those of his son Wilfred Mark Webb. He drew his book illustrations using the pseudonym WJ Webb.

Works inspired by the pilgrimage to the Middle East

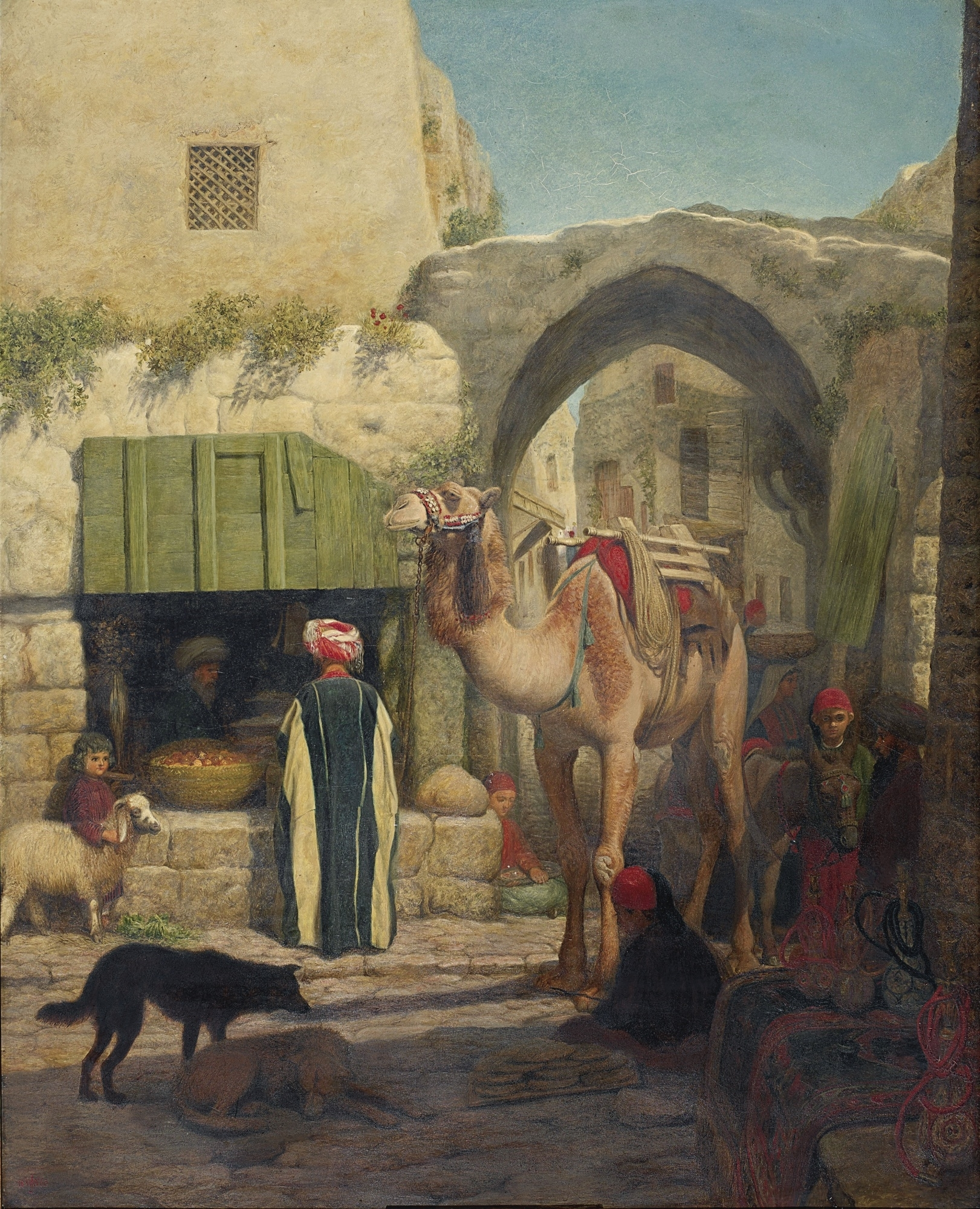
A street in Jerusalem, 1863

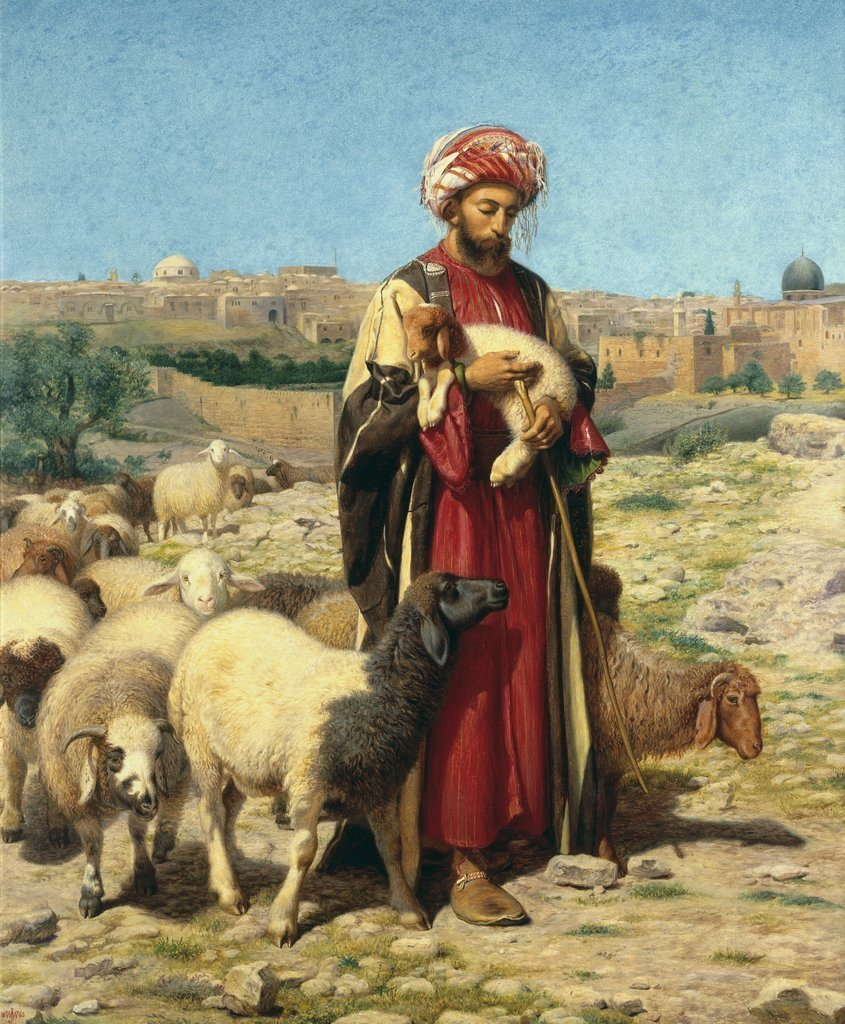
A Shepherd of Jerusalem, 1863

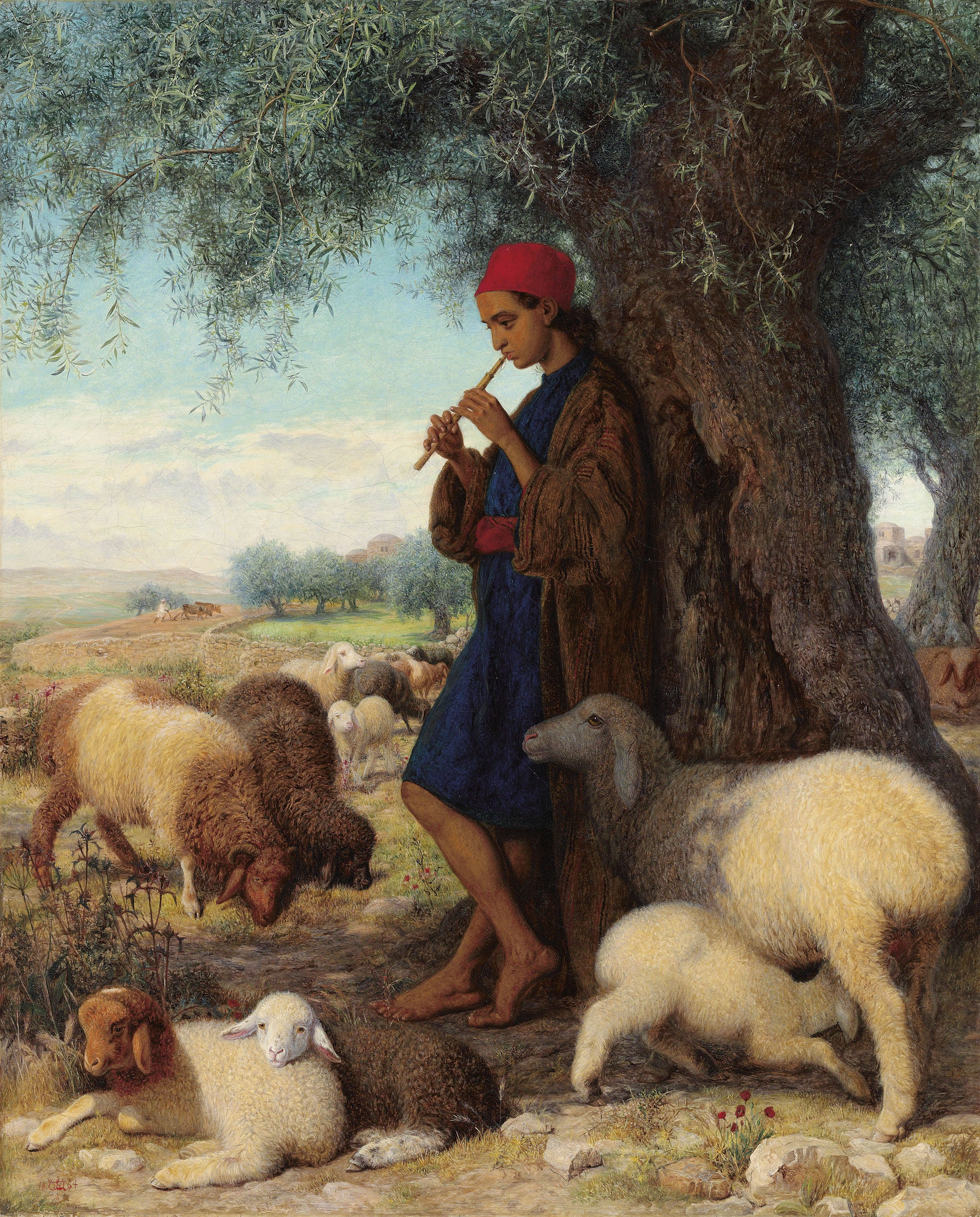
The piping shepherd, signed with monogram and dated '1864' (lower left), oil on canvas

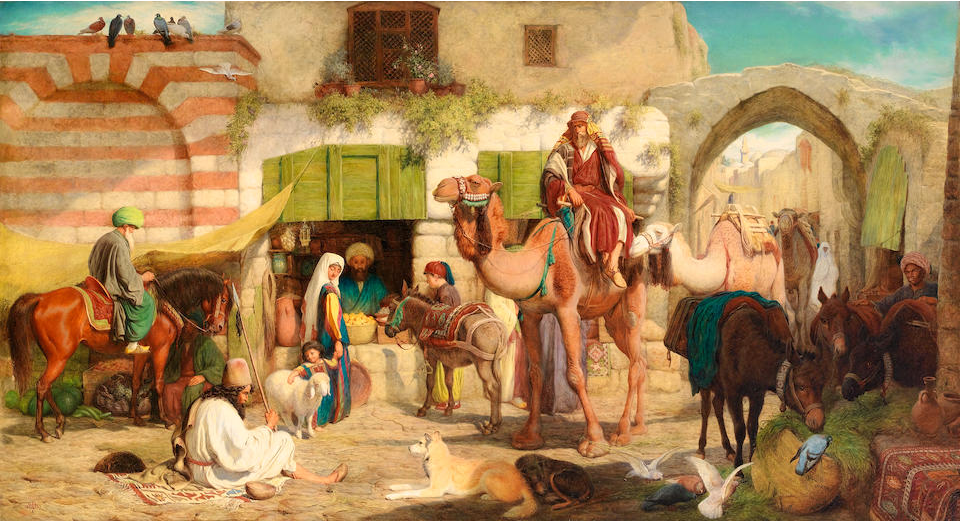
A street in Jerusalem, signed with monogram and dated '1867' (lower left)

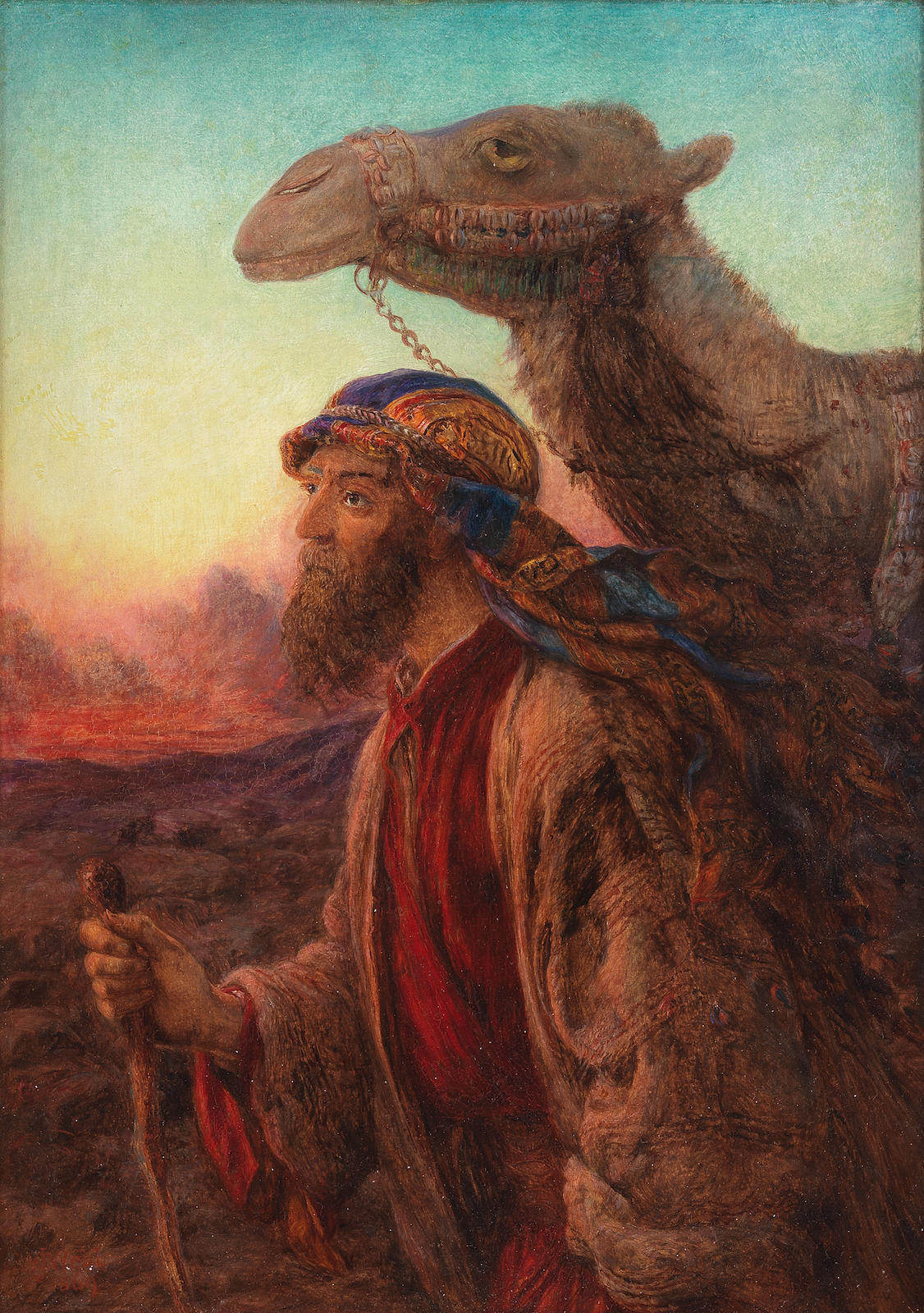
The Homeward Journey, signed and dated 'W.J.Webb/1869' (lower left), oil on panel

William James Webbe was living in the Isle of Wight in 1856, later, in 1861, he resided at Langham Chambers, "in an area where many of the Pre-Raphaelites congregated and had their studios". According to Webbe's great great grandniece, Jennie Shelley, "In the 1901 census William aged 70 and his wife Besse aged 52 were living at 4 Marlborough Rd, Ealing, Middlesex, and his occupation was artist. Also at that address was his daughter Ethel who was a science mistress." His brothers, Samuel Webb and Thomas Stirrup Webb, emigrated to New Zealand. Samuel was a pottery manufacturer in Stoke on Trent, William's mother, Sarah Stirrup, also "came from generations of pottery manufacturers".

== Reception ==
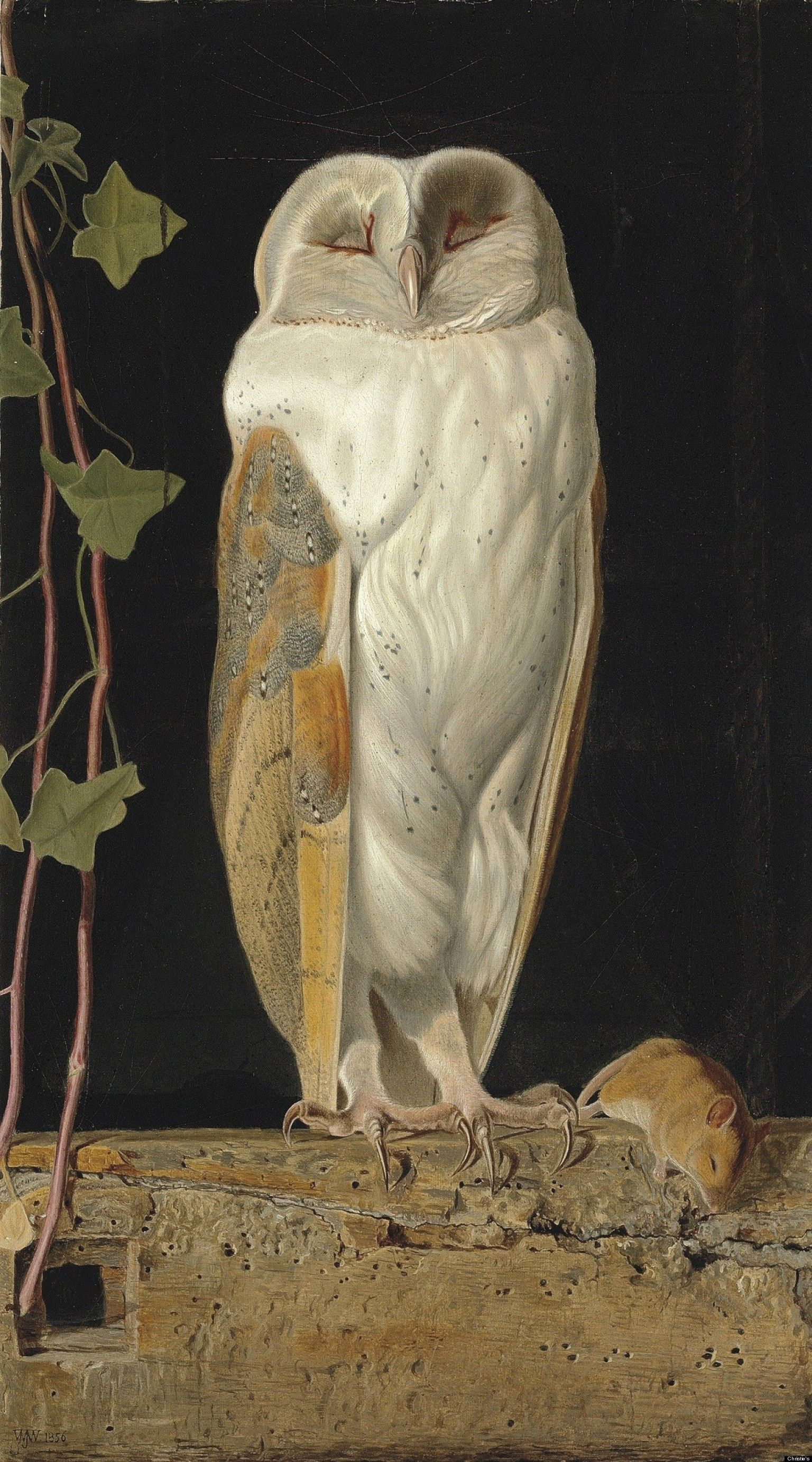
The White Owl. "Alone and warming his five wits, The white owl in the belfry sits" signed with monogram and dated '1856' (lower left) oil on board

John Ruskin briefly commented on The White Owl, exhibited at the Royal Academy in 1856, in his Academy Notes: "A careful study — the brown wing excellent. The softness of an owl's feathers is perhaps inimitable; but I think the breast might have come nearer the mark."

There are two versions of The White Owl painting; one was sold at Sotheby's Belgravia on 14 June 1977 (lot 31) and bought by the Fine Art Society, the second one was sold at Christie's London on 13 December 2012, lot 9, for £589,250: previously it was in the collection of William John Broderip (1789-1859), a lawyer and naturalist who helped to found the Zoological Society of London.

Webbe's work A street in Jerusalem (1867) received mixed reviews. His contemporary art critic Tom Taylor of the Times wrote: "[the painting] is treated in the most realistic spirit ...but the composition seems to us too crowded for the canvas, and there is an abuse of bright colour...it may be that the critic in this cold, grey north is not competent to pass judgement on eastern colour ...for Mr Webbe's clever and careful Street in Jerusalem".

== Works ==
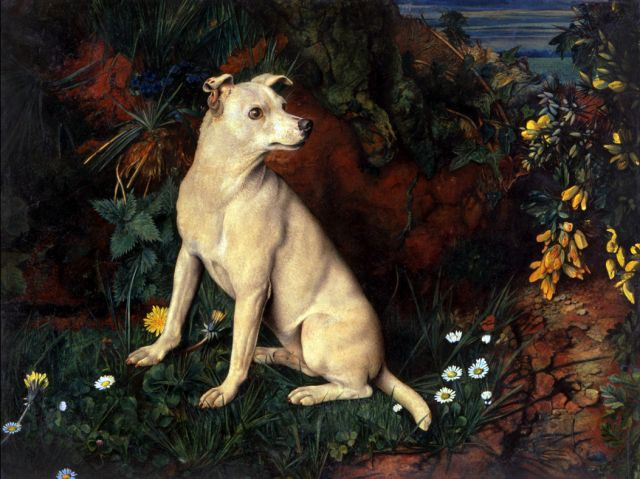
A White Terrier by a Mossy Bank with Flowers. Opaque glue-based paint, followed by resinous glazing, and brush, perhaps pen, on heavy off-white paper, 1871 (Note: As noted on the description by Toledo Museum: "The White English Terrier was established as an official breed in the early 1860s and became popular as a show dog. Renowned for its alertness, the breed quickly became extinct after 1895 when cropping of the ears was outlawed and interest in the breed waned.")

- A Hedge Bank in May, 1855
- Twilight, c. 1855
- Cattle and a Fram, 1856
- The White Owl, 1856
- Strawberries, 1860
- Lambs, 1860
- The Collared Thief, 1860
- Early Lambs, 1861
- A Rabbit, 1862
- Street in Jerusalem, 1863
- Ploughing on Mount Zion, 1864
- The Lost Sheep, 1864
- A White Terrier by a Mossy Bank with Flowers, 1871
- A Plough Team outside Jerusalem, 1879
- Perch on a River Bank

=== Book illustrations ===
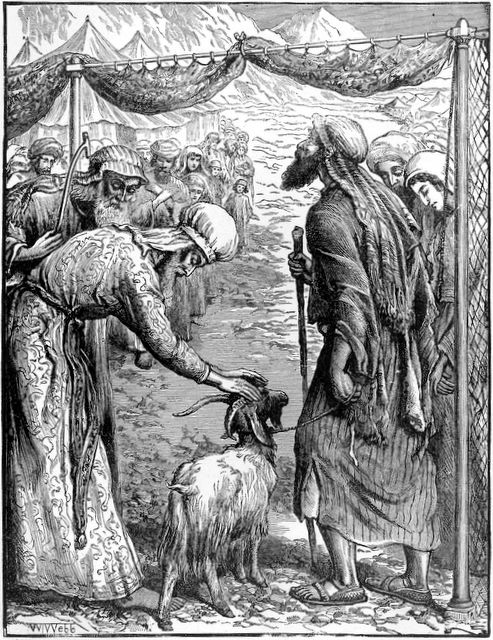
Sending Out the Scapegoat

6 books printed by Raphael Tuck and Sons:

- The 23rd Psalm
- The Influence Of Beauty by Keats
- Feld Blumen (poetry in German)
- Bluen Botschaft (poetry in German)
- Homes Of England by Felicia Hemans
- The Sower And The Seed by Helen Marion Burnside

Other books for adults:

- The Holiday Train by Frederick Longbridge
- The History of Samuel Titmarsh and the Great Hoggarty Diamond. A Little Dinner at Timmins's and Notes of a Journey from Cornhill to Grand Cairo by William Makepeace Thackeray, Smith, Elder & Co., London, 1879
- The Childrens Friend, 1893
- Eton Nature-Study And Observational Lessons (2 volumes) by M.D. Hill and Wilfred Mark Webb
- The Heritage of Dress. Being Notes on the History and Evolution of Clothes by Wilfred Mark Webb, The Times Book Club, London, 1912
- Illustrated Natural History by W. G. Ridewood, Richard Tuck, London, 1902
- The Friendly Visitor

Bible stories for children:

- Bible Stories And Pictures by James Weston
- Bible Pictures And Stories (New Testament) by James Weston
- Bible Pictures And Stories (Old and New Testament)
- The Beautiful Story
- Charming Bible Stories
- Young Folks Story Of The Bible
- Old Testament Stories by Robert Tuck
