= Fern School =

- U.S. National Register of Historic Places
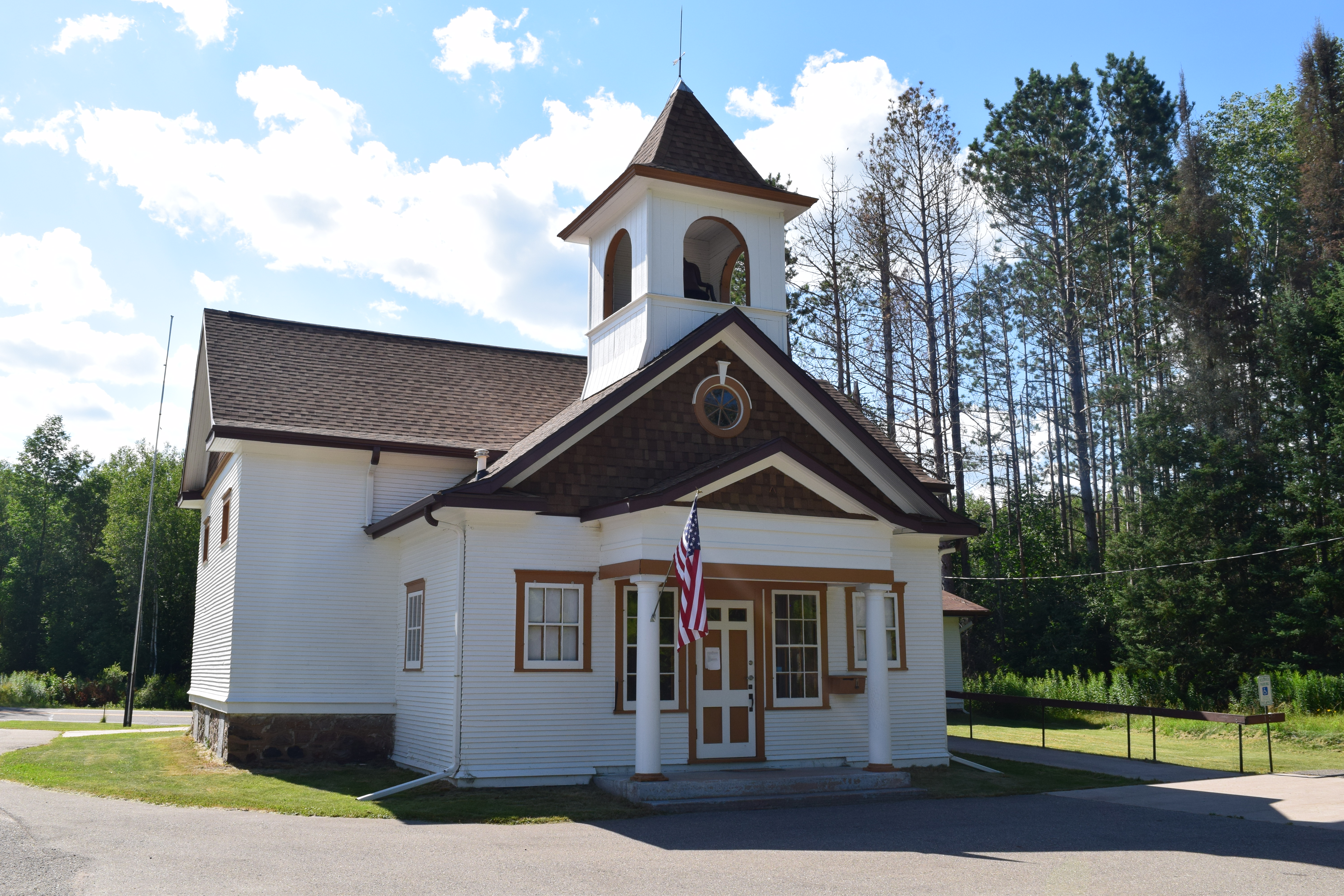

- Location within Wisconsin Location within the United States
- Nearest city: Fern, Wisconsin
- Coordinates: 45°50′10″N 88°23′13″W
- Area: 1 acre (0.40 ha)
- Built: 1921
- NRHP reference No.: 81000043
- Added to NRHP: March 20, 1981

Fern School is a historic school in the town of Fern, Wisconsin. The school, located on Wisconsin Highway 101 3 miles (4.8 km) north of County Highway C, was built in 1921 and has also served as the Fern Town Hall. Fern School was built in the Colonial Revival style using clapboard. The school was added to the National Register of Historic Places on March 20, 1981.
