= F. J. Lauerman House =

- U.S. National Register of Historic Places
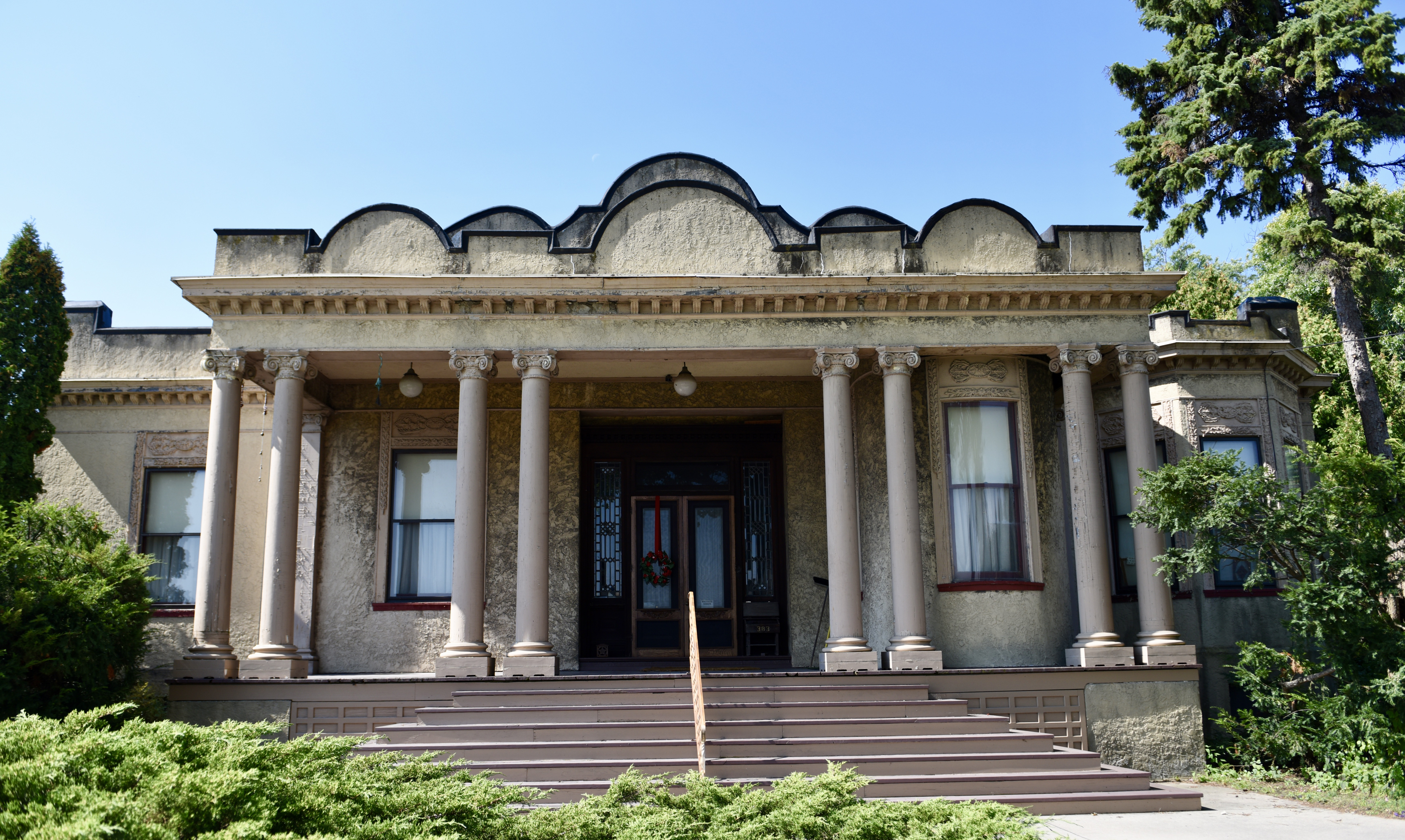
- Front entrance to the house

- Location within Wisconsin Location within the United States
- Location: 383 State St., Marinette, Wisconsin
- Coordinates: 45.0998400°N 87.6391044°W
- Area: less than one acre
- Built: 1901
- Architect: L.B. Valk
- Architectural style: Mission and Renaissance Style
- NRHP reference No.: 79000094
- Added to NRHP: August 14, 1979

The F. J. Lauerman House, also known as Casa del Flores, is a house located in Marinette, Wisconsin. It was added to the National Register of Historic Places on August 14, 1979.

== History ==
The house was built for F. J. Lauerman, a prominent member of Marinette, who was originally from Muscoda. Lauerman promised his wife to be allowed to design their house. She liked the design of the Gail Borden house that appeared in a 1900 issue of the Ladies' Home Journal. That house had been designed by L. B. Valk, an architect from Los Angeles.

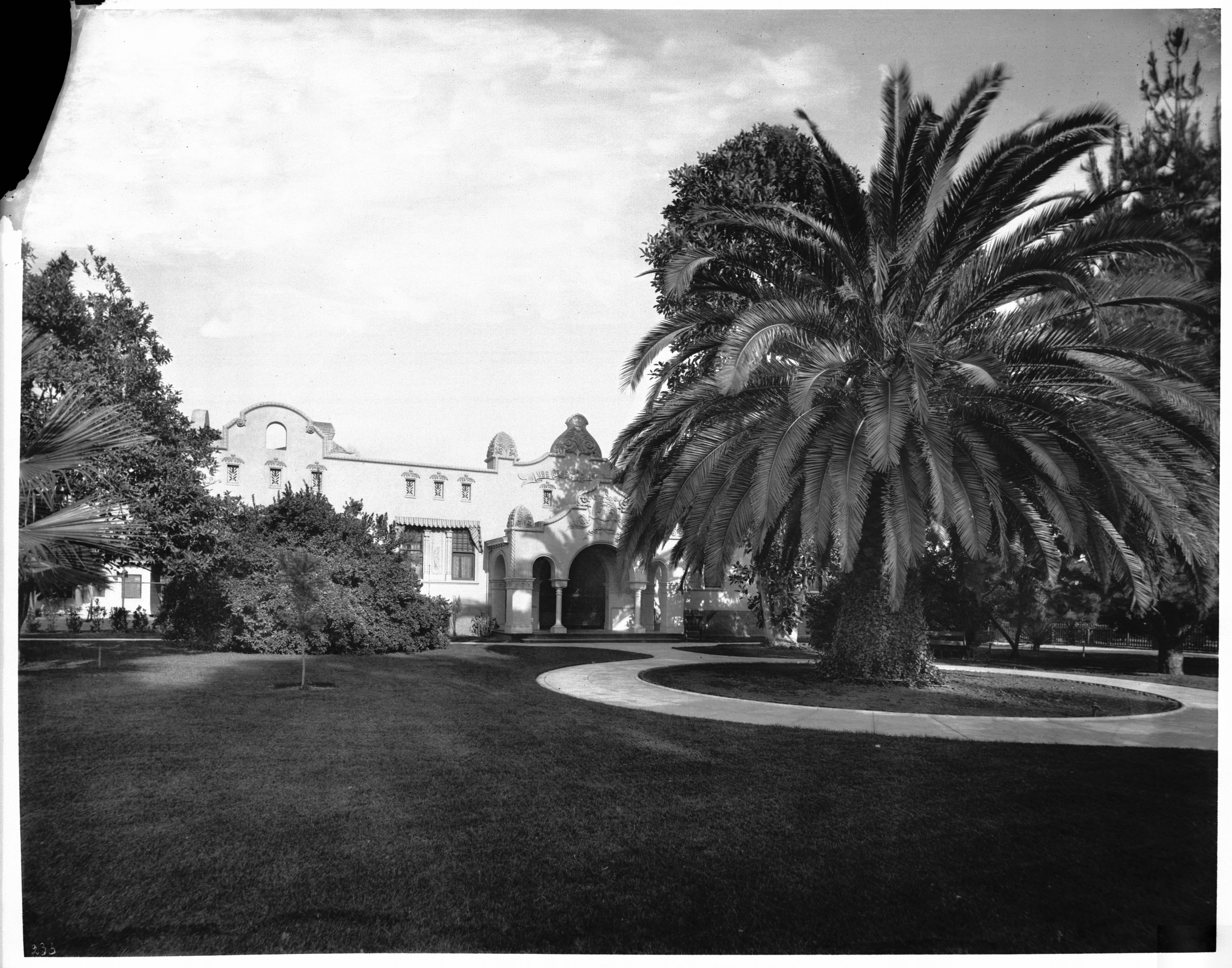
Gail Borden residence in Alhambra

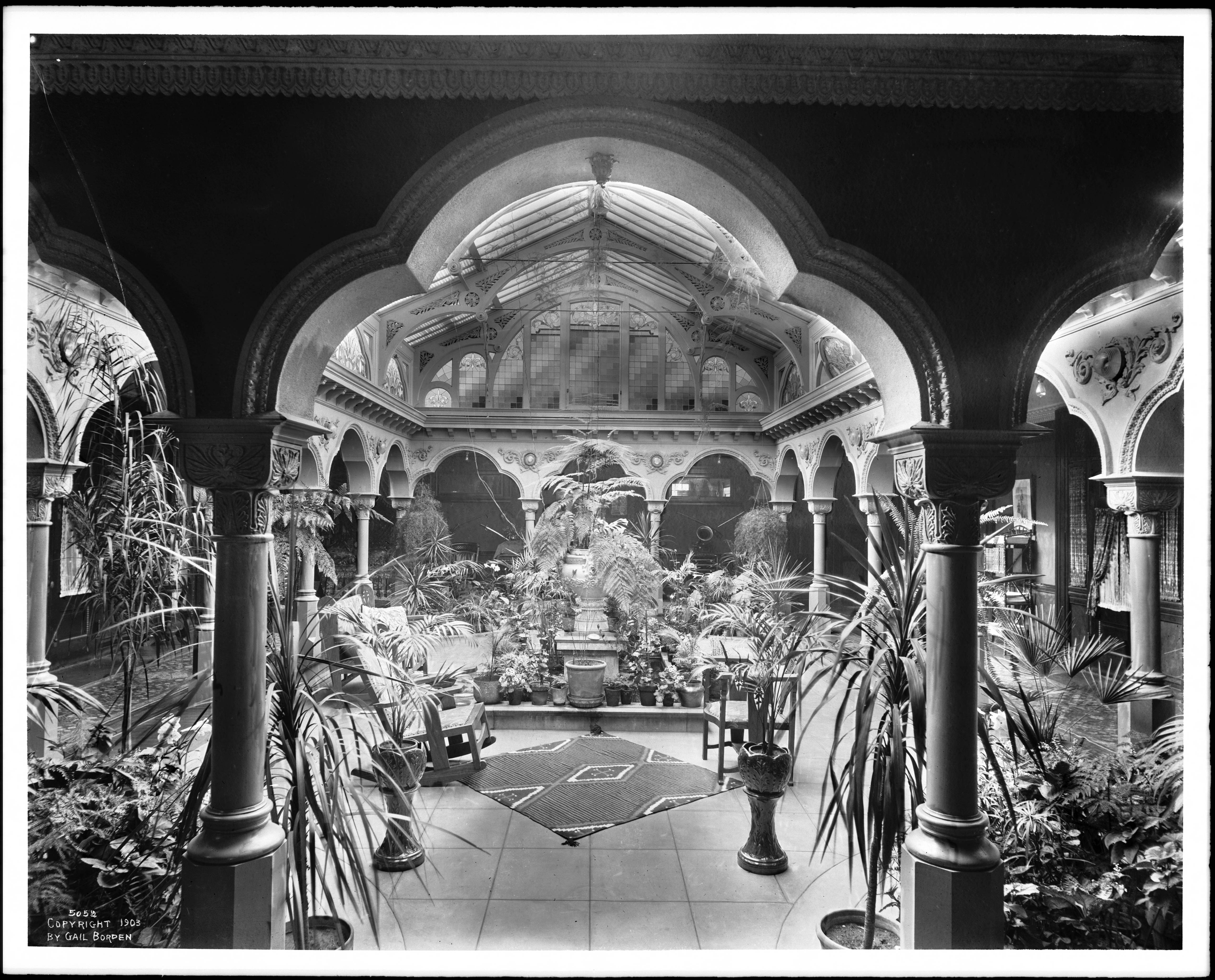
Central courtyard of the Gail Borden residence, which was also duplicated in Marinette

After inquiring to Valk, Mrs. Lauerman was able to get a house designed and built for around $20,000. The house was of exotic design to the area and unmatched in the Wisconsin landscape at the time. The house was completed in 1901. Mrs. Lauerman only lived there for two years after its completion. Mr. Lauerman continued to live in the house until his death in 1959. The house still remains with his family.
