= Fern, Wisconsin =

- Town
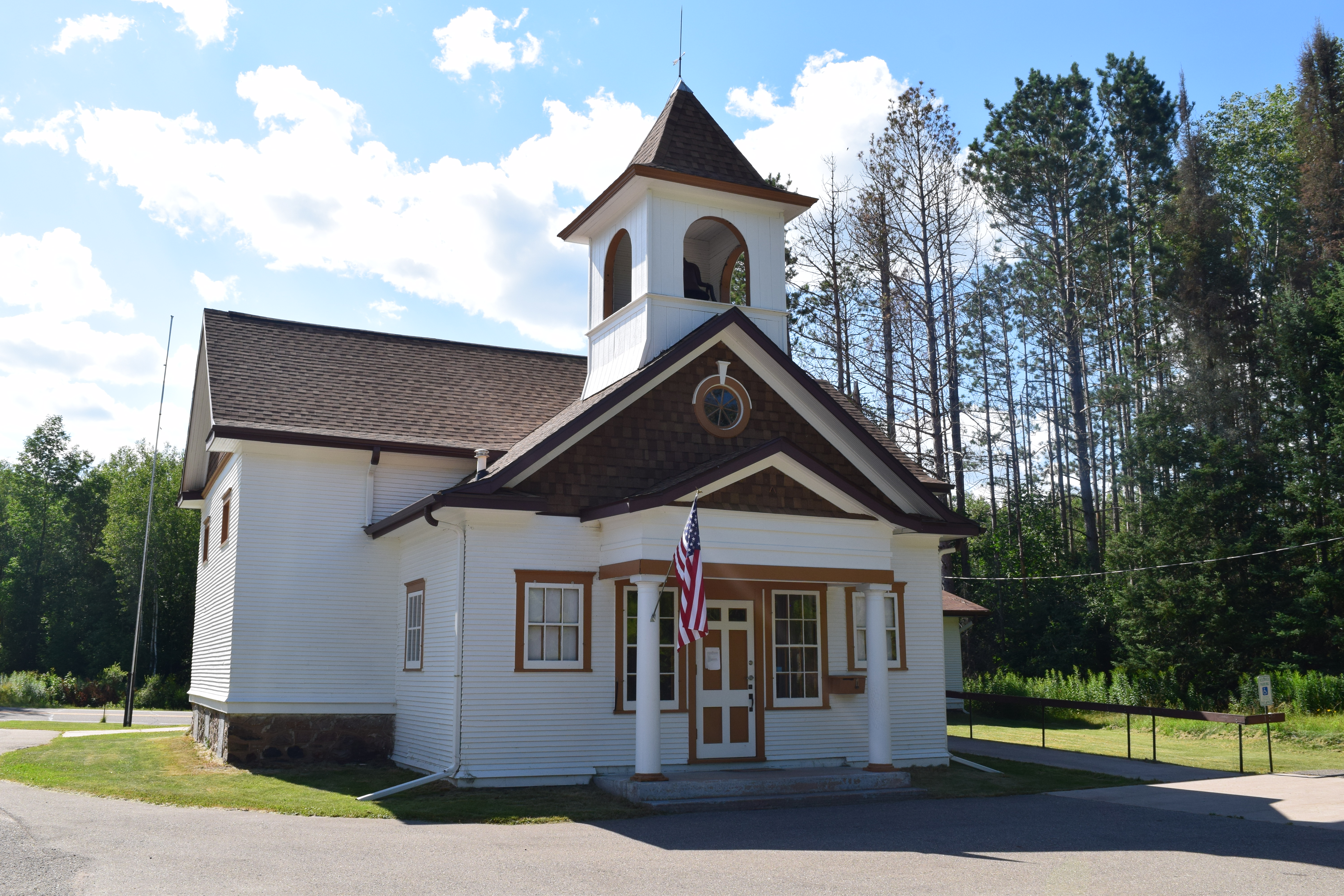
- Fern School in Fern

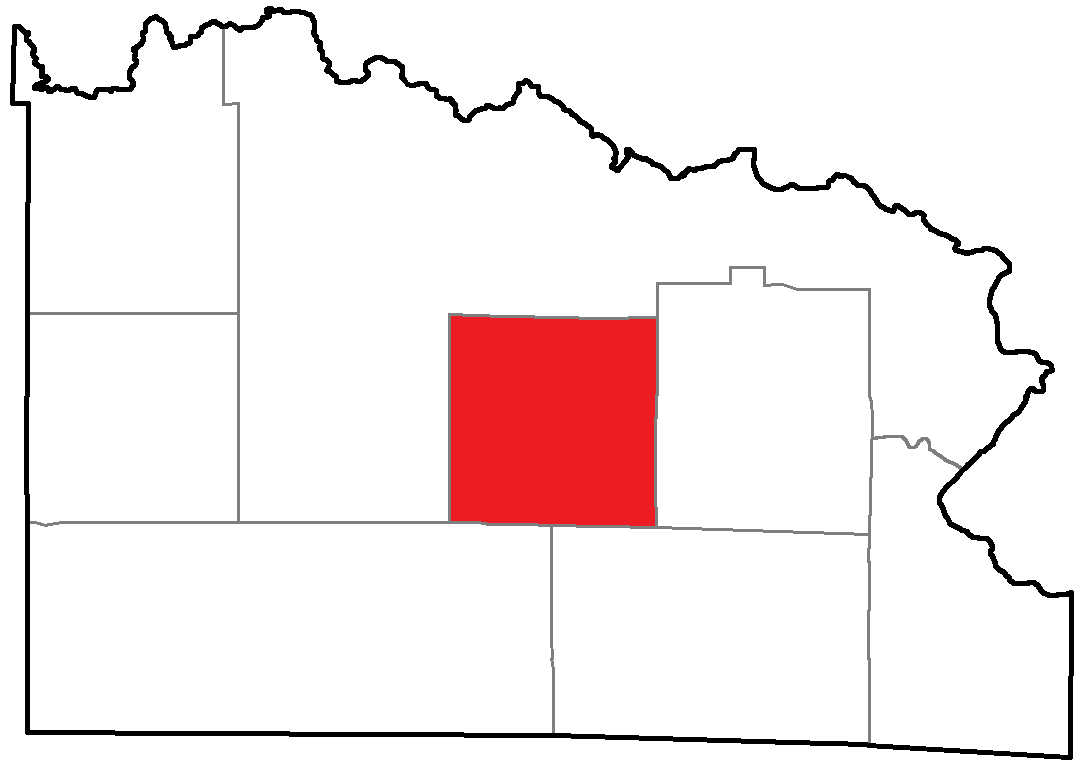
- Location of Fern, within Florence County

- Location within Wisconsin
- Coordinates: 45°51′42″N 88°20′56″W
- Country: United States
- State: Wisconsin
- County: Florence

Area
  - Total: 35.2 sq mi (91.1 km^{2})
  - Land: 34.0 sq mi (88.0 km^{2})
  - Water: 1.2 sq mi (3.0 km^{2})
- Elevation: 1,319 ft (402 m)

Population (2020)
  - Total: 181
  - Density: 5.33/sq mi (2.06/km^{2})
- Time zone: UTC-6 (Central (CST))
  - Summer (DST): UTC-5 (CDT)
- Area codes: 715 & 534
- FIPS code: 55-25675
- GNIS feature ID: 1583200
- Website: https://www.fernwisconsin.com/

Fern is a town in Florence County, Wisconsin, United States. The population was 181 at the 2020 census.

== Geography ==
According to the United States Census Bureau, the town has a total area of 35.2 square miles (91.1 km^{2}), of which 34.0 square miles (88.1 km^{2}) is land and 1.2 square miles (3.0 km^{2}) (3.33%) is water.

== Demographics ==
Historical population
Census	Pop.	Note	%±
1920	115		—
1930	83		−27.8%
1940	130		56.6%
1950	105		−19.2%
1960	67		−36.2%
1970	61		−9.0%
1980	111		82.0%
1990	112		0.9%
2000	153		36.6%
2010	159		3.9%
2020	181		13.8%
U.S. Decennial Census

As of the census of 2000, there were 153 people, 71 households, and 47 families residing in the town. The population density was 4.5 inhabitants per square mile (1.7/km^{2}). There were 334 housing units at an average density of 9.8 per square mile (3.8/km^{2}). The racial makeup of the town was 98.04% White, and 1.96% from two or more races.

There were 71 households, out of which 25.4% had children under the age of 18 living with them, 56.3% were married couples living together, 8.5% had a female householder with no husband present, and 32.4% were non-families. 31.0% of all households were made up of individuals, and 14.1% had someone living alone who was 65 years of age or older. The average household size was 2.15 and the average family size was 2.67.

In the town, the population was spread out, with 22.2% under the age of 18, 2.0% from 18 to 24, 21.6% from 25 to 44, 35.3% from 45 to 64, and 19.0% who were 65 years of age or older. The median age was 46 years. For every 100 females, there were 118.6 males. For every 100 females age 18 and over, there were 124.5 males.

The median income for a household in the town was $37,708, and the median income for a family was $43,125. Males had a median income of $35,625 versus $18,125 for females. The per capita income for the town was $16,746. About 11.6% of families and 10.1% of the population were below the poverty line, including 14.3% of those under the age of eighteen and 14.8% of those 65 or over.
