= Fence, Wisconsin =

- Town
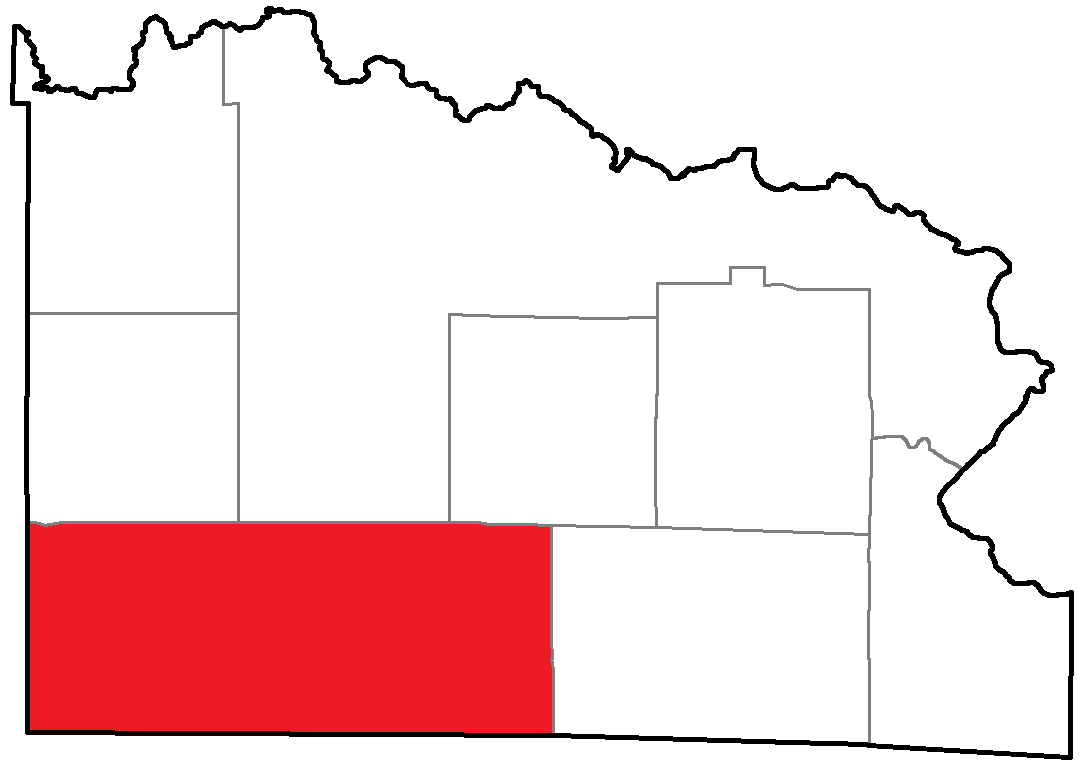
- Location of Fence, within Florence County

- Location within Wisconsin
- Coordinates: 45°45′30″N 88°30′47″W
- Country: United States
- State: Wisconsin
- County: Florence

Area
  - Total: 90.0 sq mi (233.2 km^{2})
  - Land: 89.5 sq mi (231.7 km^{2})
  - Water: 0.58 sq mi (1.5 km^{2})
- Elevation: 1,463 ft (446 m)

Population (2020)
  - Total: 183
  - Density: 2.05/sq mi (0.790/km^{2})
- Time zone: UTC-6 (Central (CST))
  - Summer (DST): UTC-5 (CDT)
- Area codes: 715 & 534
- FIPS code: 55-25575
- GNIS feature ID: 1583196
- Website: https://townoffence.com/

Fence is a town in Florence County, Wisconsin, United States. The population was 183 at the 2020 census. The origin of the name "Fence" is obscure.

== Geography ==
According to the United States Census Bureau, the town has a total area of 90.0 square miles (233.2 km^{2}), of which 89.4 square miles (231.6 km^{2}) is land and 0.6 square mile (1.5 km^{2}) (0.66%) is water.

== Demographics ==
Historical population
Census	Pop.	Note	%±
1930	246		—
1940	285		15.9%
1950	275		−3.5%
1960	195		−29.1%
1970	191		−2.1%
1980	192		0.5%
1990	222		15.6%
2000	231		4.1%
2010	192		−16.9%
2020	183		−4.7%
U.S. Decennial Census

As of the census of 2010, there were 207 people, 107 households, and 60 families residing in the town. The population density was 2.6 inhabitants per square mile (1.0/km^{2}). There were 373 housing units at an average density of 4.2 per square mile (1.6/km^{2}). The racial makeup of the town was 97.40% White, 0.43% African American, 1.30% Native American, 0.43% Asian, and 0.43% from two or more races. Hispanic or Latino of any race were 0.43% of the population.

There were 107 households, out of which 18.7% had children under the age of 18 living with them, 50.5% were married couples living together, 5.6% had a female householder with no husband present, and 43.0% were non-families. 35.5% of all households were made up of individuals, and 11.2% had someone living alone who was 65 years of age or older. The average household size was 2.16 and the average family size was 2.87.

In the town, the population was spread out, with 21.2% under the age of 18, 4.3% from 18 to 24, 29.4% from 25 to 44, 26.8% from 45 to 64, and 18.2% who were 65 years of age or older. The median age was 43 years. For every 100 females, there were 122.1 males. For every 100 females age 18 and over, there were 116.7 males.

The median income for a household in the town was $30,278, and the median income for a family was $35,250. Males had a median income of $31,023 versus $20,625 for females. The per capita income for the town was $15,169. About 7.7% of families and 13.3% of the population were below the poverty line, including 19.6% of those under the age of eighteen and 14.6% of those 65 or over.
