= Webb Peak =

Webb Peak may refer to:

- Webb Peak (Palmer Land)
- Webb Peak (Victoria Land)
