= Webb (given name) =

Webb is a given name. Notable people with the name include:

- Webb C. Ball (1848–1922), American jeweler and watchmaker
- Webb Franklin (born 1941), US Representative from Mississippi
- Webb Gillman (1870–1933), Irish General
- Webb Hayes (1856–1923), American businessman and soldier
- Webb Miller (born 1943), American professor
- Webb Miller (journalist) (1891–1940), American war correspondent
- Webb Pierce (1921–1991), American country music singer
- Webb D. Sawyer (1918–1995), American Marine general, Navy Cross recipient
- Webb Seymour, 10th Duke of Somerset (1718–1793)
- Webb Simpson (born 1985), American golfer
- Webb Schultz (1898–1986), American baseball pitcher
- Webb Wilder (born 1954), American rock singer
