= Alfred Webb Investment Properties =

Historic buildings in Portland, Oregon, U.S.

- U.S. National Register of Historic Places
- Portland Historic Landmark
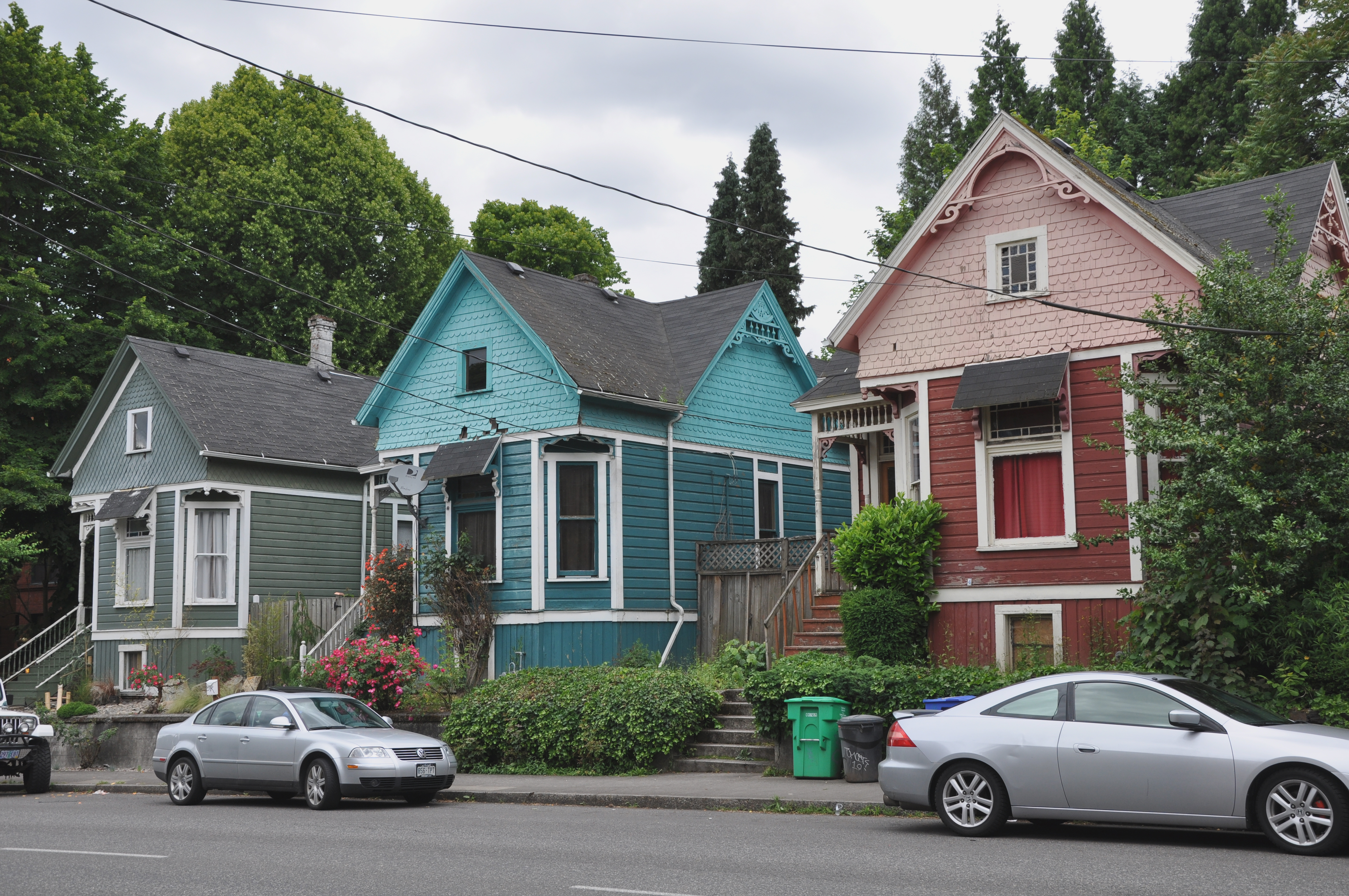
- The three Webb Investment Properties along Belmont Street in 2011
- Location: 822 SE 15th Avenue; 1503–1517 SE Belmont Street; Portland, Oregon
- Coordinates: 45°31′00″N 122°39′01″W
- Built: 1891
- Architectural style: Queen Anne
- MPS: Portland Eastside
- NRHP reference No.: 89000100
- Added to NRHP: March 8, 1989

The Alfred Webb Investment Properties in southeast Portland in the U.S. state of Oregon consists of four Queen Anne cottages listed on the National Register of Historic Places. Built in 1891, they were added to the register in 1989.

Nearly identical in their floor plans, the single-family dwellings have brick foundations and full basements. External features include multiple gables, imbricated shingles, spindlework, and other decorative features associated with small, late 19th-century working-class houses built in the Queen Anne style. Each interior includes a foyer, living room, dining room, bedroom, kitchen, and bathroom, and features such as pocket doors. The dwellings, built on narrow lots, share a small back yard.

Webb, who owned Webb Safe and Lock Company, developed several residential properties in southeast Portland. He and his wife, Martha, who owned the four Queen Anne cottages from 1891 to 1928, lived elsewhere in the neighborhood and rented out the cottages. Subsequent owners through at least 1989 continued to maintain the dwellings as rental properties.

== See also ==
- National Register of Historic Places listings in Southeast Portland, Oregon
