= Florence County Courthouse and Jail =

- U.S. National Register of Historic Places
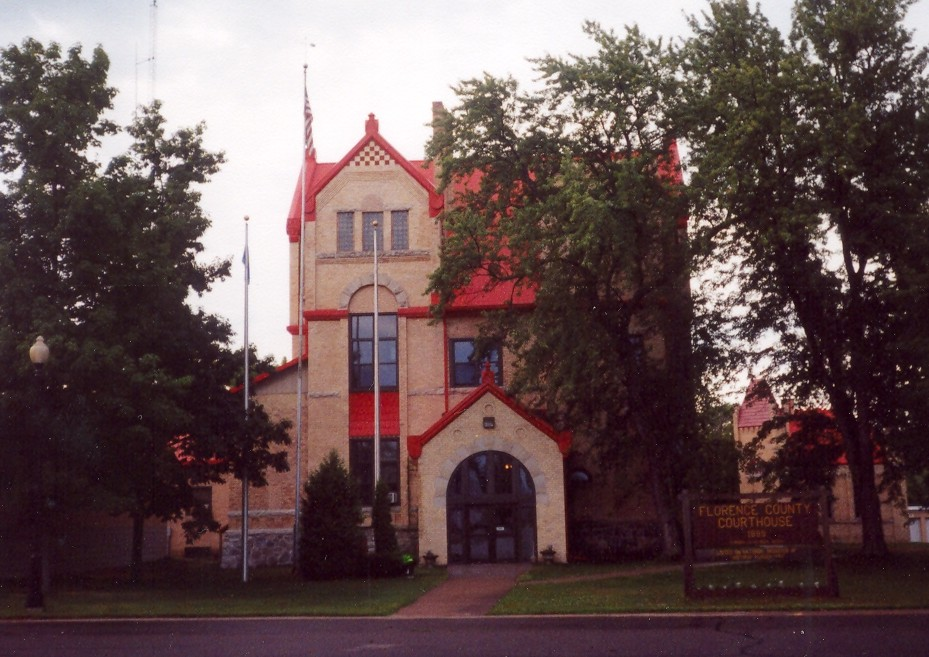

- Location within Wisconsin Location within the United States
- Location: 501 Lake St., Florence, Wisconsin
- Coordinates: 45°55′16″N 88°14′56″W
- Area: less than one acre
- Built: 1889
- Architect: James E. Clancy
- Architectural style: Romanesque
- MPS: County Courthouses of Wisconsin TR
- NRHP reference No.: 85003029
- Added to NRHP: December 02, 1985

The Florence County Courthouse and Jail, built in 1889, is an historic complex of governmental buildings located at 501 Lake Street in Florence, Wisconsin. Designed by architect James E. Clancy of Antigo in the Romanesque style, it was built of brick with local sandstone and blue limestone trim and terra cotta roofs. The courthouse cost $13,000 while the 3-cell jail building cost $4,000.

On December 2, 1985, the complex was added to the National Register of Historic Places.

The courthouse is still in use. A south addition was built in 1994. The jail has not been used as such since the 1930s. It is open to the public during the summer months.
