= Webb School =

Webb School may refer to:

- The Webb School (Bell Buckle, Tennessee), founded in 1870 by William R. "Sawney" Webb
- Webb School of Knoxville, a private day school in Knoxville, Tennessee, founded in 1955
- The Webb Schools, two private schools in Claremont, California; The Webb School of California for Boys (1922) and The Vivian Webb School for Girls (1981)
- Webb School (Hancock County, Mississippi), a Mississippi Landmark

== See also ==
- Webbs Female Academy, Webbs, Kentucky, listed on the NRHP in Green County, Kentucky
