= Lena Road School =

- U.S. National Register of Historic Places
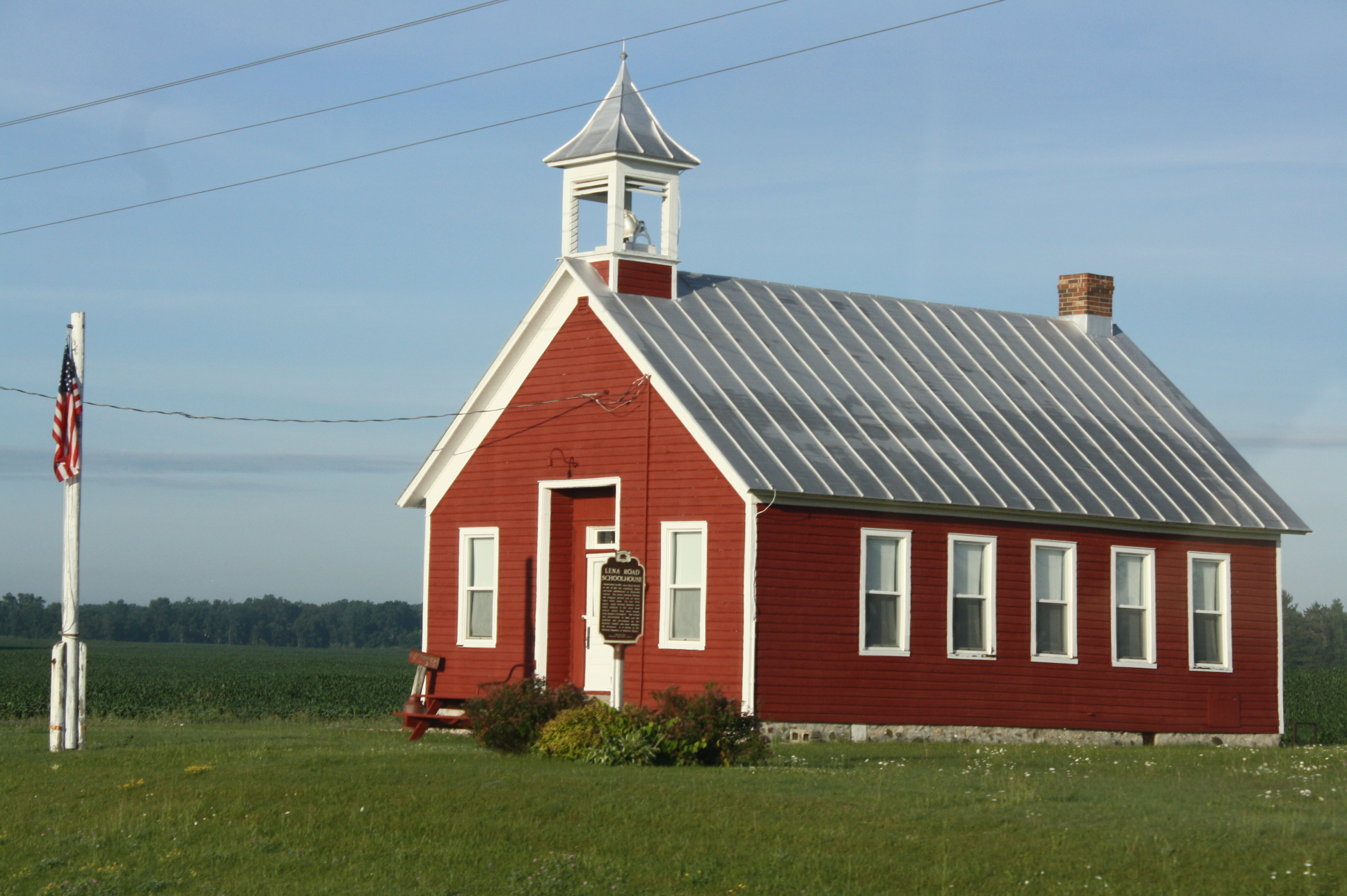
- Lena Road School

- Location within Wisconsin Location within the United States
- Location: Pound, Wisconsin
- Coordinates: 45.03858°N 88.04513°W
- Built: 1911
- NRHP reference No.: 02000415
- Added to NRHP: April 26, 2002

The Lena Road School is located in Pound, Wisconsin. It was added to the National Register of Historic Places in 2002.

== History ==
The school taught grades 1 through 8 before it was consolidated in 1964. Afterwards, the building was bought by the Maedke family who then restored it.
