= David M. and Lottie Fulmer House =

Historic house in Wisconsin, United States

- U.S. National Register of Historic Places
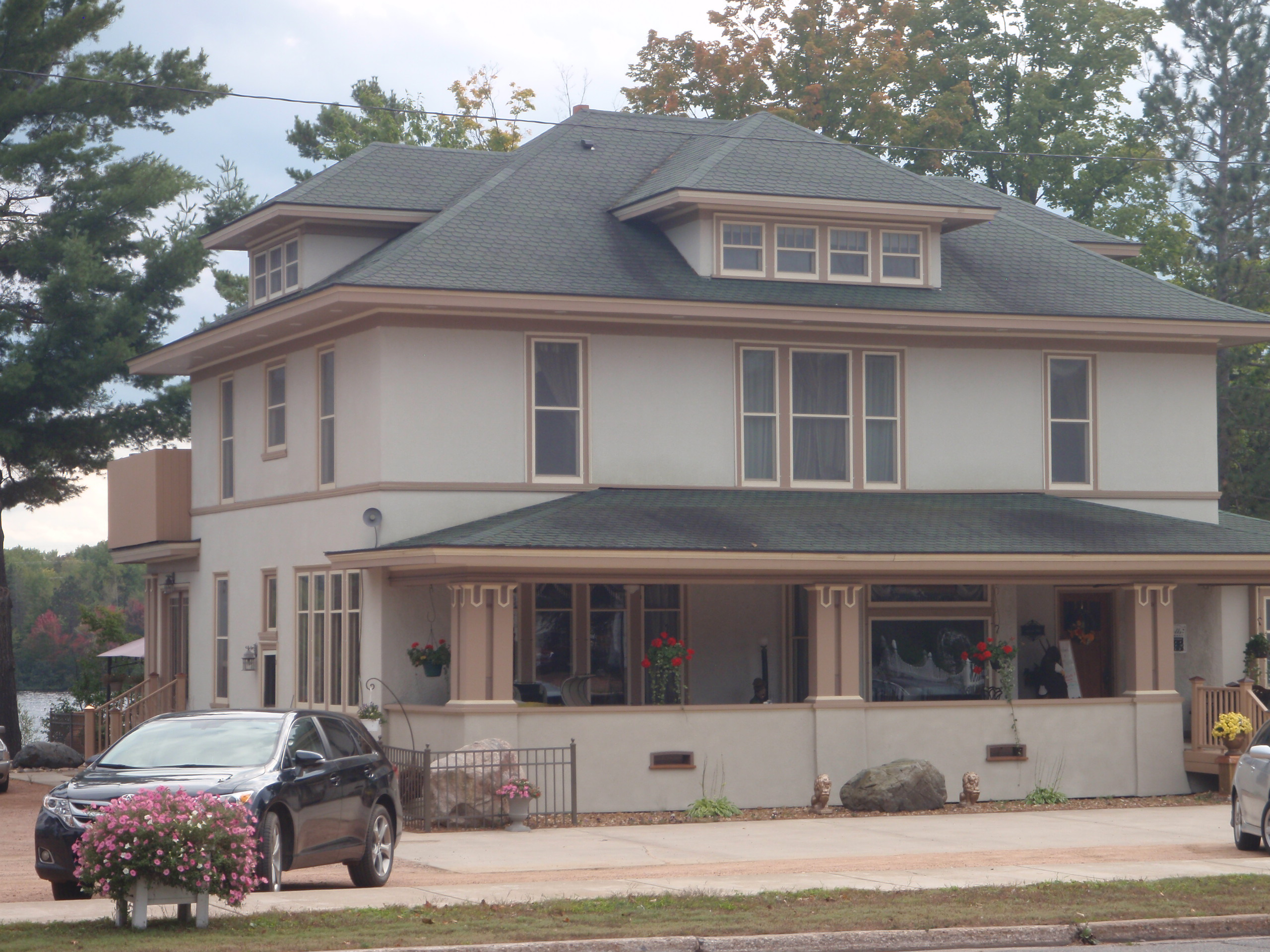
- David M. and Lottie Fulmer House
- Location: 209 Central Ave. Florence, Wisconsin
- Coordinates: 45.92205°N 88.24544°W
- Built: 1899
- Architectural style: Prairie School
- NRHP reference No.: 14000196
- Added to NRHP: May 5, 2014

The David M. and Lottie Fulmer House is located in the Town of Florence, Wisconsin.

== History ==
David M. Fulmer was a prominent figure in the lumber industry. He and his wife, Lottie, lived in the house until 1903. At that time, it was purchased by Max Sells, a bank president and District Attorney of Florence County, Wisconsin. His wife, Nellie, continued to reside in the house after his death. Following Nellie's death, the house was inherited by their daughter, Verle E. Fulmer. Verle was a circuit court judge and the first woman to be elected to a judgeship in the state.

The house has since been converted into a restaurant, Maxsell's. It was added to the State Register of Historic Places in 2013 and to the National Register of Historic Places the following year.
