= Robert B. and Estelle J. Webb House =

Historic house in Wisconsin, United States

- U.S. National Register of Historic Places
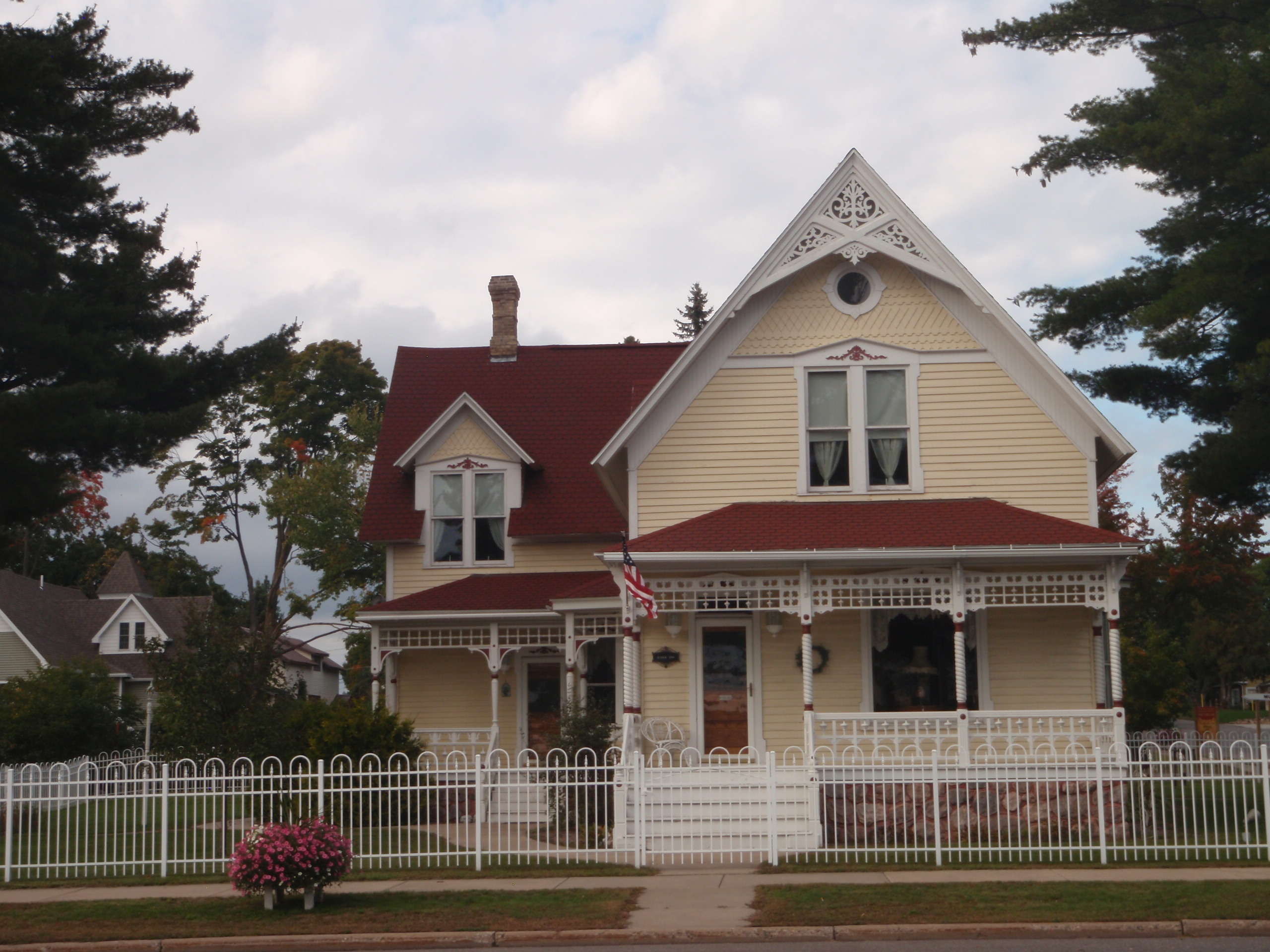
- Robert B. and Estelle J. Webb House
- Location: 200 Central Ave. Florence, Wisconsin
- Coordinates: 45.92255°N 88.24508°W
- Built: 1883
- Architectural style: Queen Anne
- NRHP reference No.: 14000197
- Added to NRHP: May 5, 2014

The Robert B. and Estelle J. Webb House is located in Florence, Wisconsin.

== History ==
Robert was involved in mining and ran a hardware store in Florence. The house was added to the State Register of Historic Places in 2013 and to the National Register of Historic Places the following year.
