= Florence (CDP), Wisconsin =

Census-designated place in Wisconsin, United States

Florence, Wisconsin
- Census-designated place
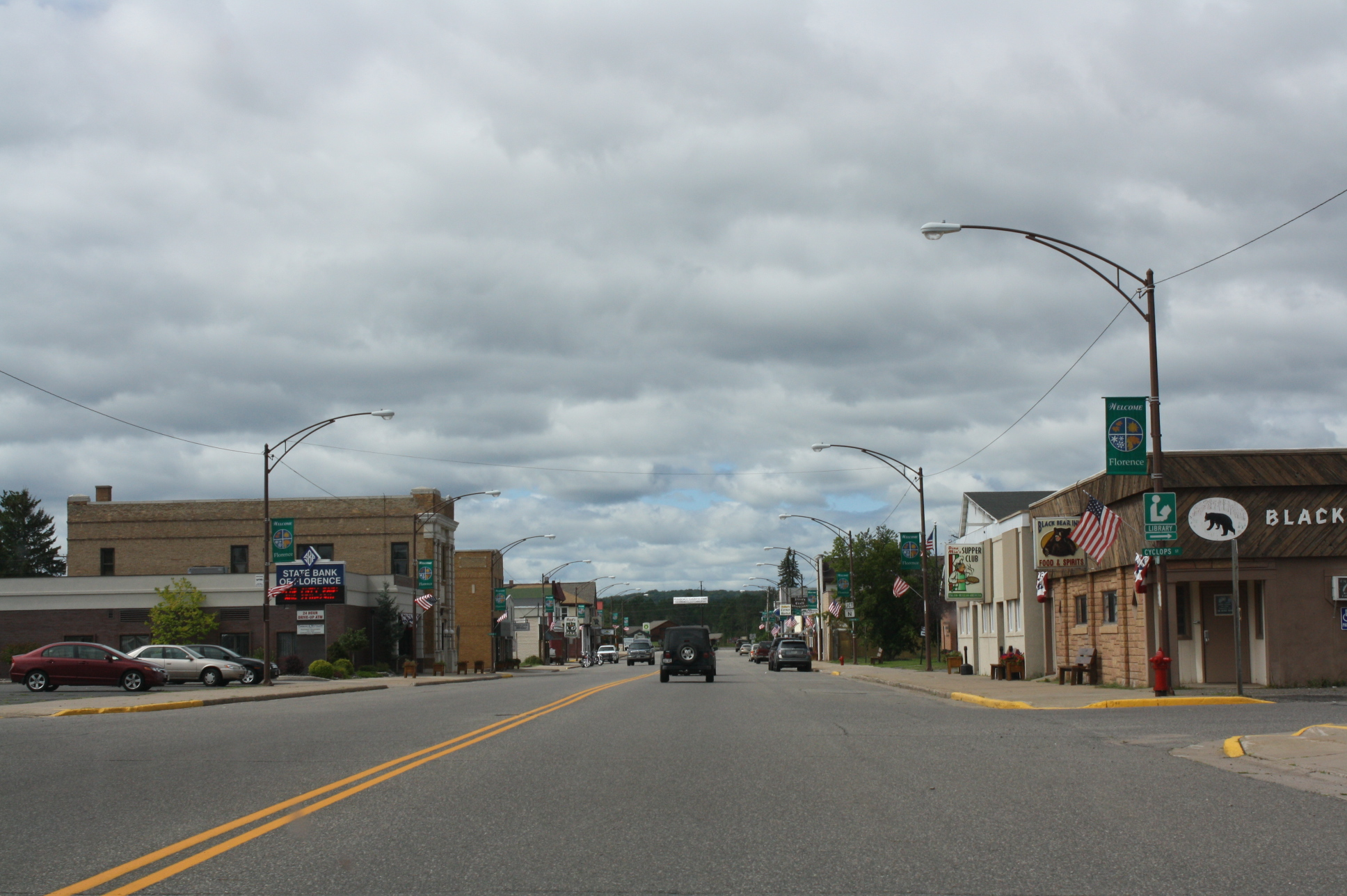
- Looking west at downtown Florence

- Location within Wisconsin
- Coordinates: 45°55′20″N 88°15′06″W
- Country: United States
- State: Wisconsin
- County: Florence

Area
  - Total: 1.783 sq mi (4.62 km^{2})
  - Land: 1.704 sq mi (4.41 km^{2})
  - Water: 0.079 sq mi (0.20 km^{2})
- Elevation: 1,306 ft (398 m)

Population (2010)
  - Total: 592
  - Density: 347/sq mi (134/km^{2})
- Time zone: UTC-6 (Central (CST))
  - Summer (DST): UTC-5 (CDT)
- ZIP code: 54121
- Area codes: 715 & 534
- GNIS feature ID: 1565079

Florence is a census-designated place in and the county seat of Florence County, Wisconsin, United States. Florence is located in northern Florence County, in the town of Florence. Florence has a post office with ZIP code 54121. The community was named a census-designated place in 2010. As of the 2010 census, its population was 592.

== History ==
Florence and the area surrounding belonged to the Menominee and was a hunting and trapping region until iron was discovered there in the 1870s. The Florence Mine was discovered in October 1874 by H. D. Fisher. The mine was named in 1879 after the wife of Nelson Powell Hulst, Florence Terry Hulst.

We all wish to call the new town and the mine Florence, to honor the first white woman who had courage enough to settle (for a while) in that rugged country.

I mean the first white woman known to us.

Will you permit your name to be used?

— J. J. Hagerman, in a letter to Florence Terry Hulst (December 15, 1879)

The county subsequently took on the same name.

== Geography ==
Florence is located at 45°55′20″N 88°15′06″W at an elevation of 1,306 feet (398 m). Florence is situated in the Northern Highland region of Wisconsin near the Michigan border. Fisher Lake is located to the south of the community, and Fisher Creek runs to its east. The community of Commonwealth is 1 mile (1.6 km) south of Florence. The nearest city to Florence is Iron Mountain, which is 11.5 miles (18.5 km) to the southeast; Florence County has no incorporated communities. US Highway 2 and US Highway 141 run through the community, and Wisconsin Highway 70 and Wisconsin Highway 101 terminate in western Florence; County Highway N also serves the community.

== Education ==
Florence High School is the area's public high school.

== Notable people ==
- Kenneth L. Greenquist, member of the Wisconsin State Senate, was born in Florence.
- Charles White Whittlesey, Medal of Honor recipient in World War I, was born in Florence.

== Images ==
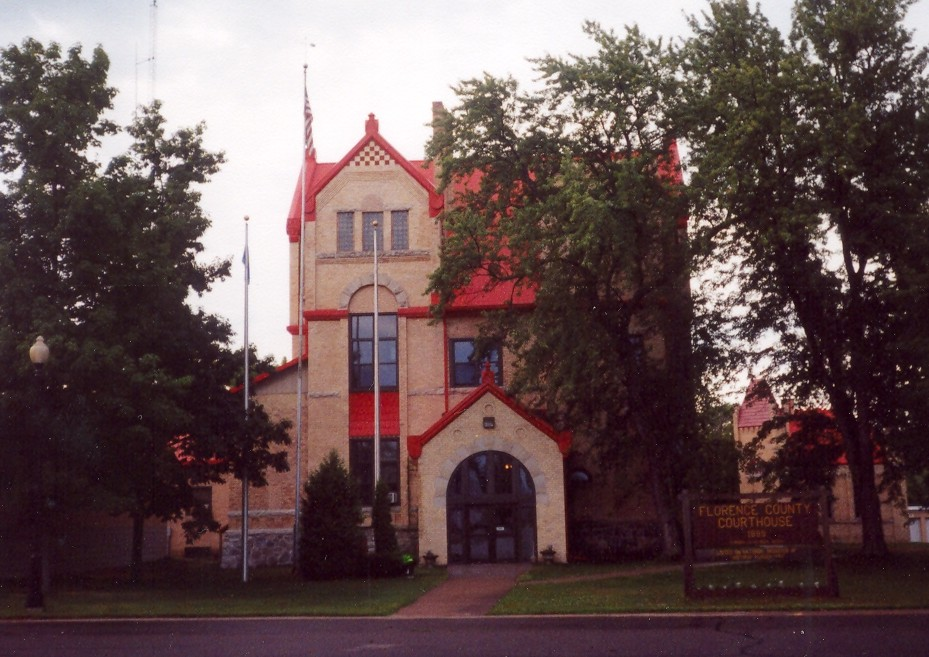
Florence County Courthouse and Jail

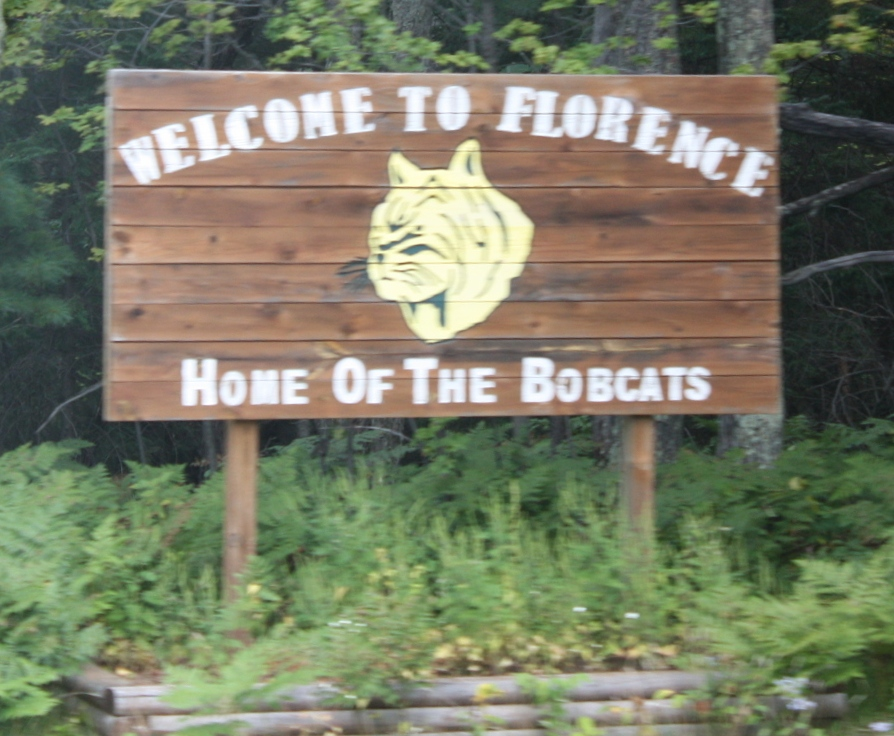
Welcome sign

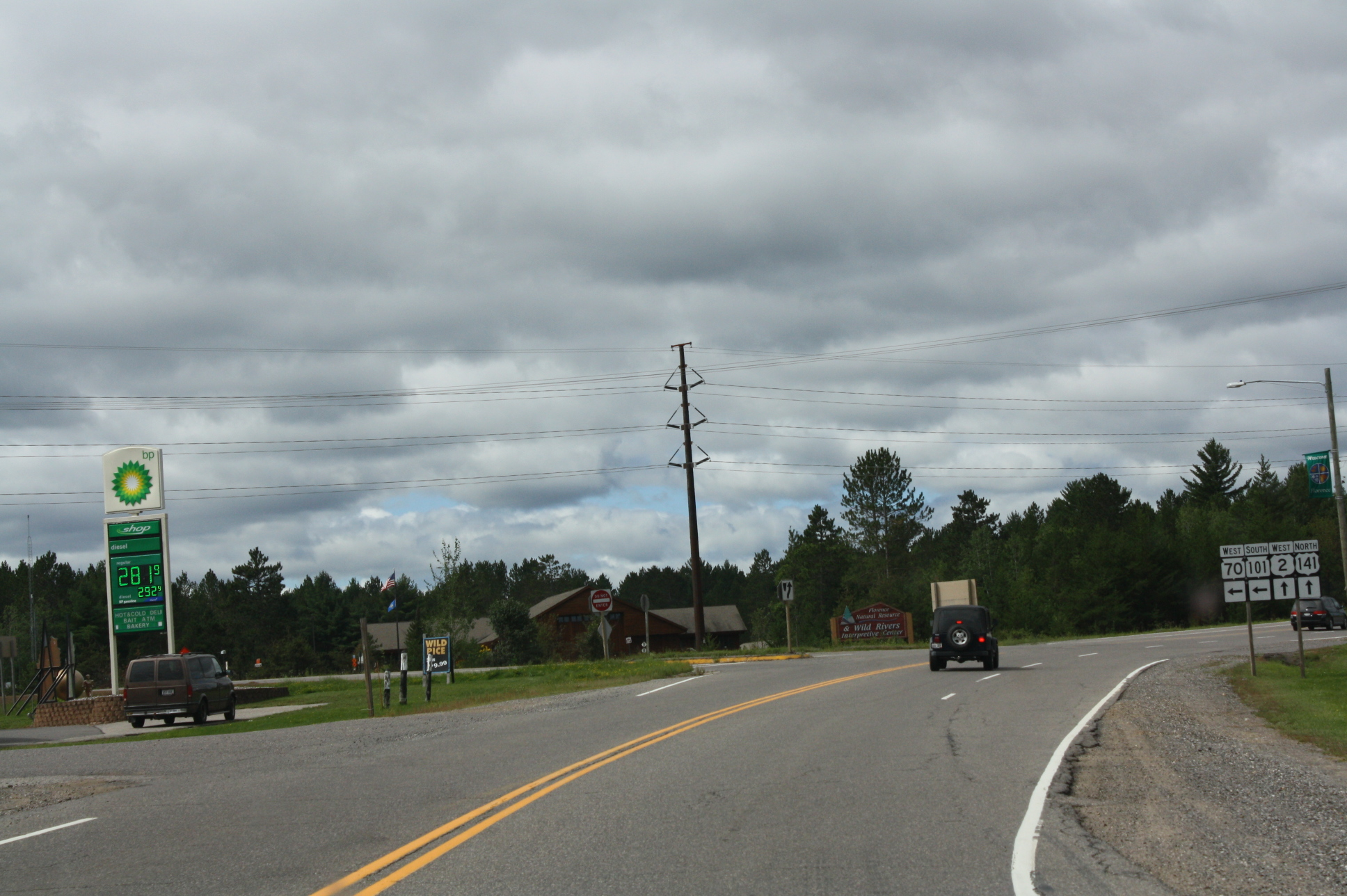
WIS 70 / WIS 101 termini

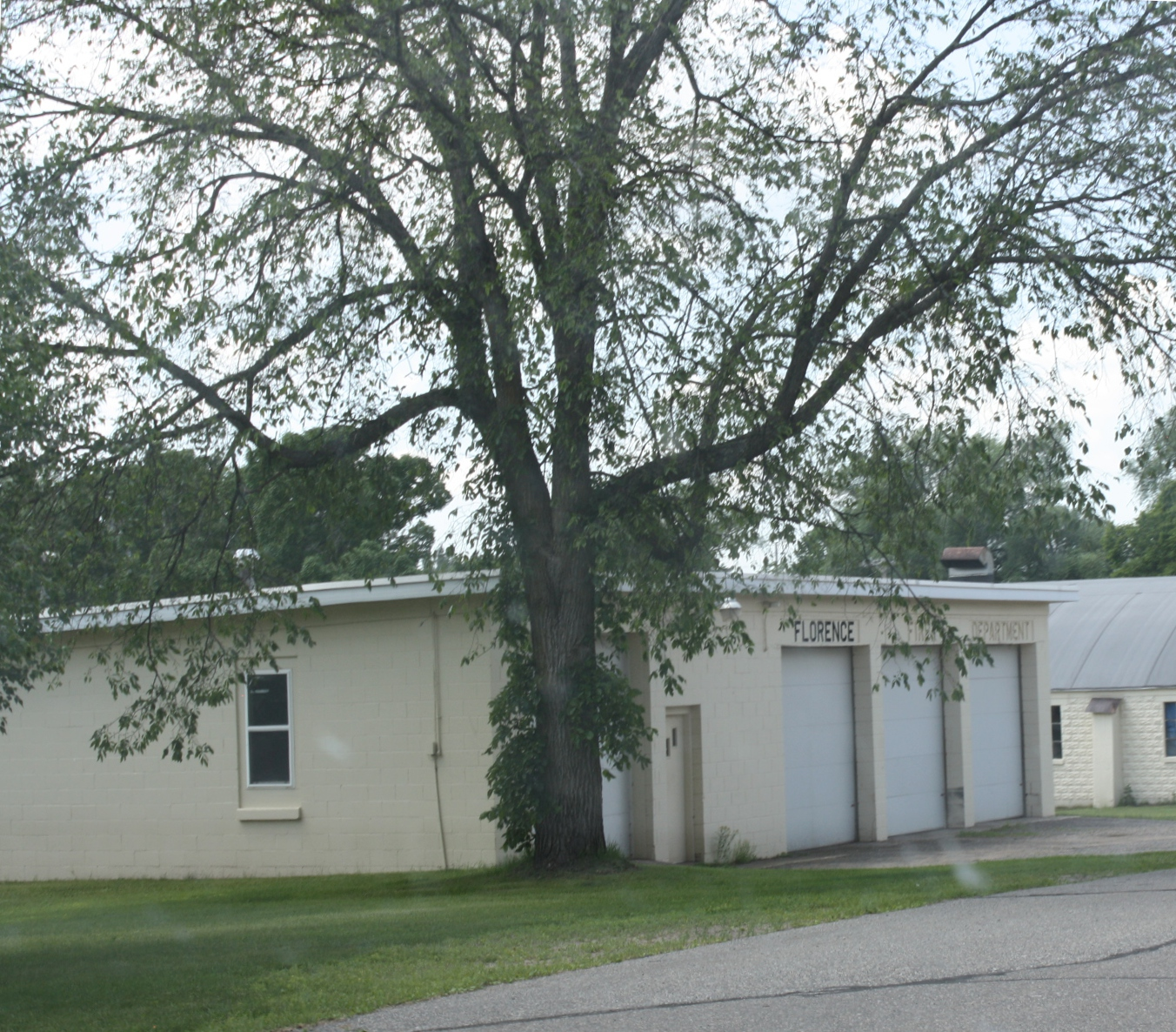
Fire department

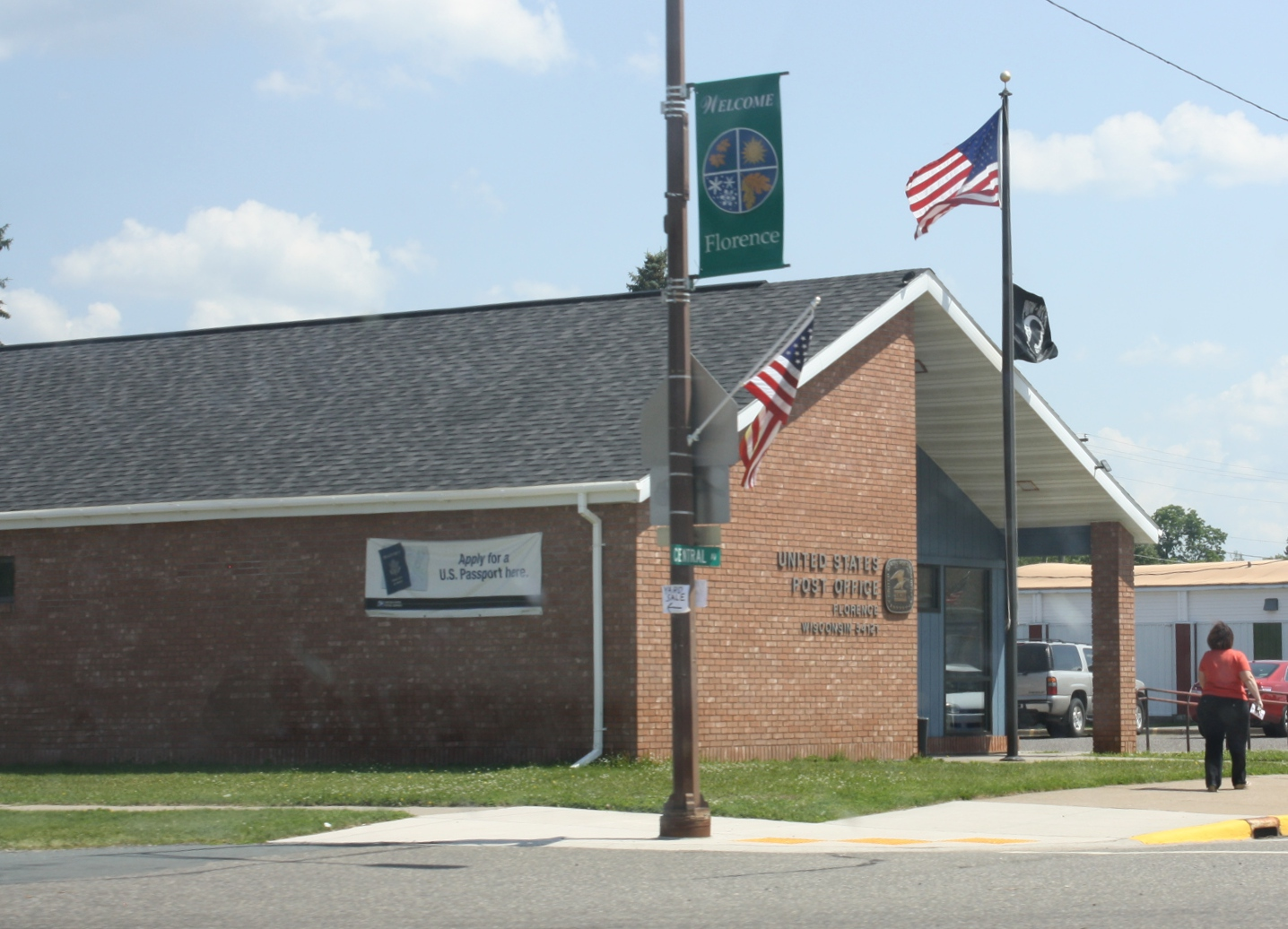
Post office

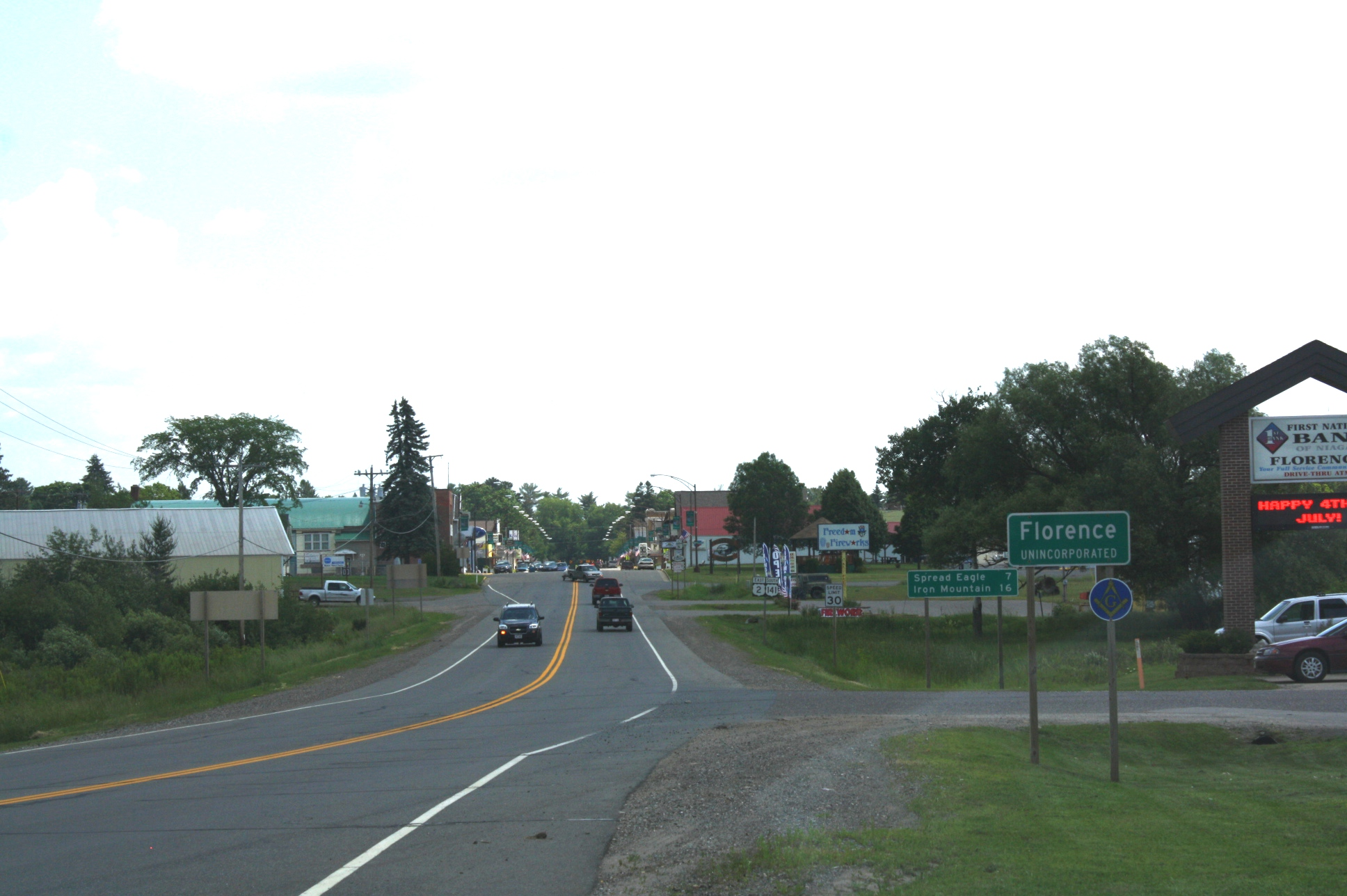
Looking east at Florence on US2 / US141

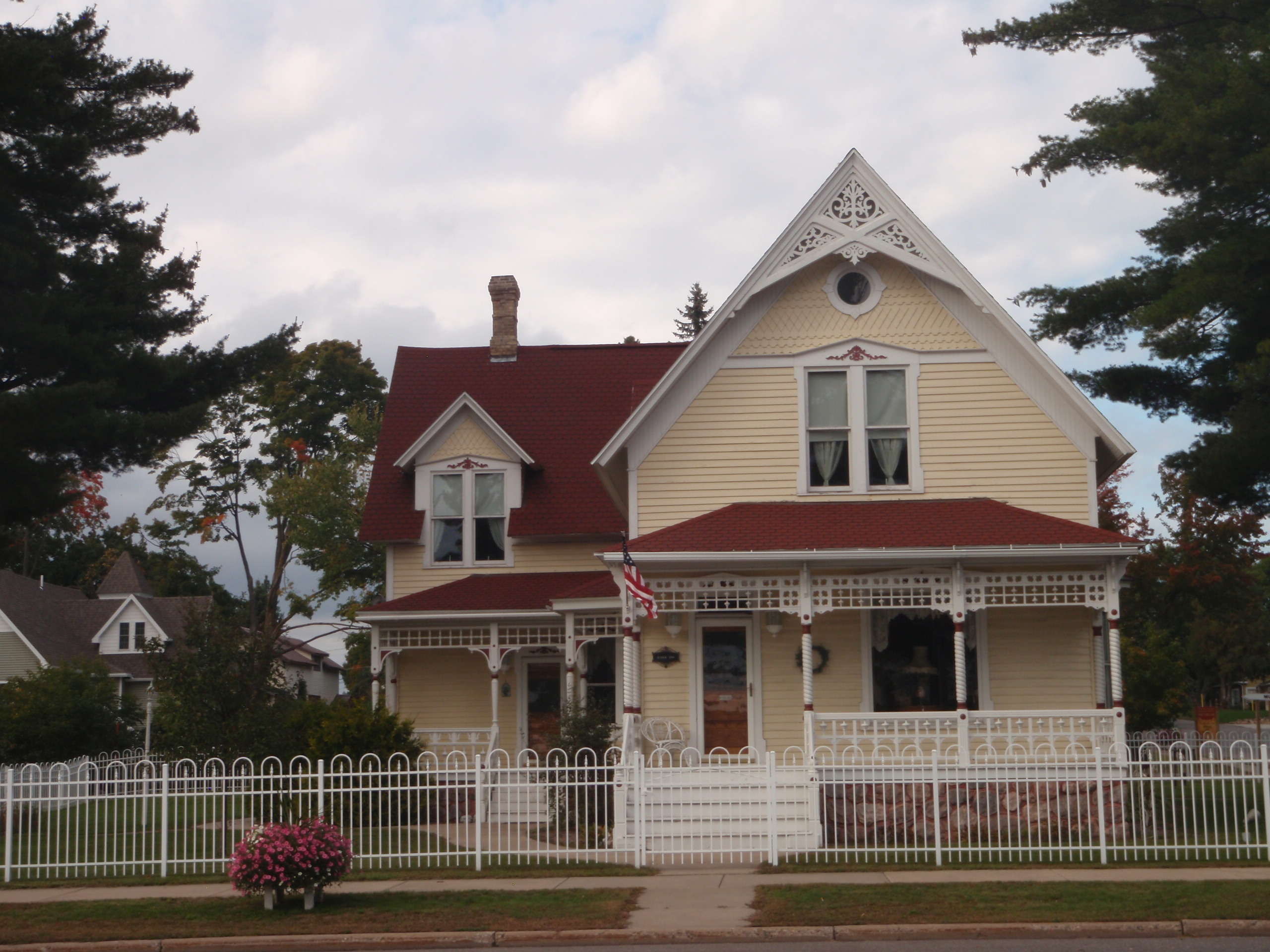
Robert B. and Estelle J. Webb House

== See also ==
- List of census-designated places in Wisconsin
