= Grandma Lake Wetlands State Natural Area =

State Natural Area in Wisconsin

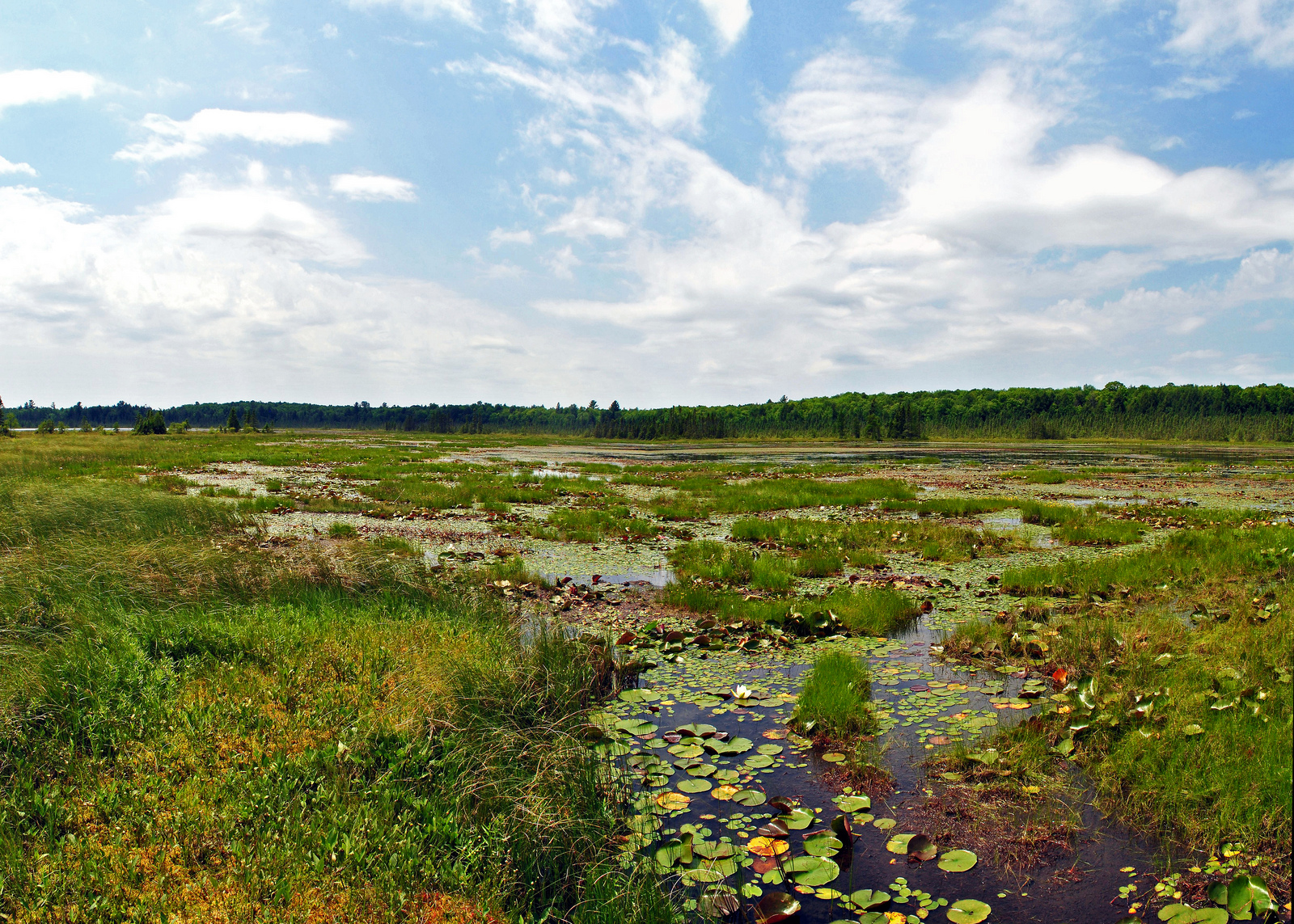

- Location within Wisconsin Location within the United States
- Location: Florence County, Wisconsin
- Coordinates: 45°48′58″N 88°36′46″W
- Area: 495 acres (200 ha)
- Elevation: 1,522 ft (464 m)
- Established: 1996
- Owner: The Nature Conservancy and the Door County Land Trust
- Website: Official website
- Wisconsin State Natural Areas

Grandma Lake Wetlands State Natural Area is a Wisconsin Department of Natural Resources-designated State Natural Area featuring the undeveloped, pristine 44-acre Grandma Lake, which lies in a depression formed during the last glacial period. The lake is ringed by a large, open sphagnum bog mat. The bog mat is surrounded by a coniferous swamp of tamarack (Larix laricina) and black spruce (Picea mariana). The bog mat supports a plant community that is considered diverse and unusual, with several rare species present, including: bog arrow-grass (Triglochin maritima), dragon's mouth orchid (Arethusa bulbosa), livid sedge (Carex livida), small-headed bog sedge (Carex tenuiflora), as well as one of only a few known populations of bog rush (Juncus stygius) in the State of Wisconsin. In 1991, the US Forest Service designated the site as a Research Natural Area. Also, the site is listed as one of Wisconsin's Wetland Gems, by the Wisconsin Wetlands Association.

== Location and access ==
Grandma Lake Wetlands is located within the Nicolet National Forest, in southwest Florence County, approximately 3 miles (4.8 km) southeast of Long Lake. Access is via a walking trail that leads west from Grandma Lake Road, approximately 0.5 miles south of its intersection with Tie Mill Road. A small, brown breeding bird survey fencepost marks the trailhead.

== Gallery ==
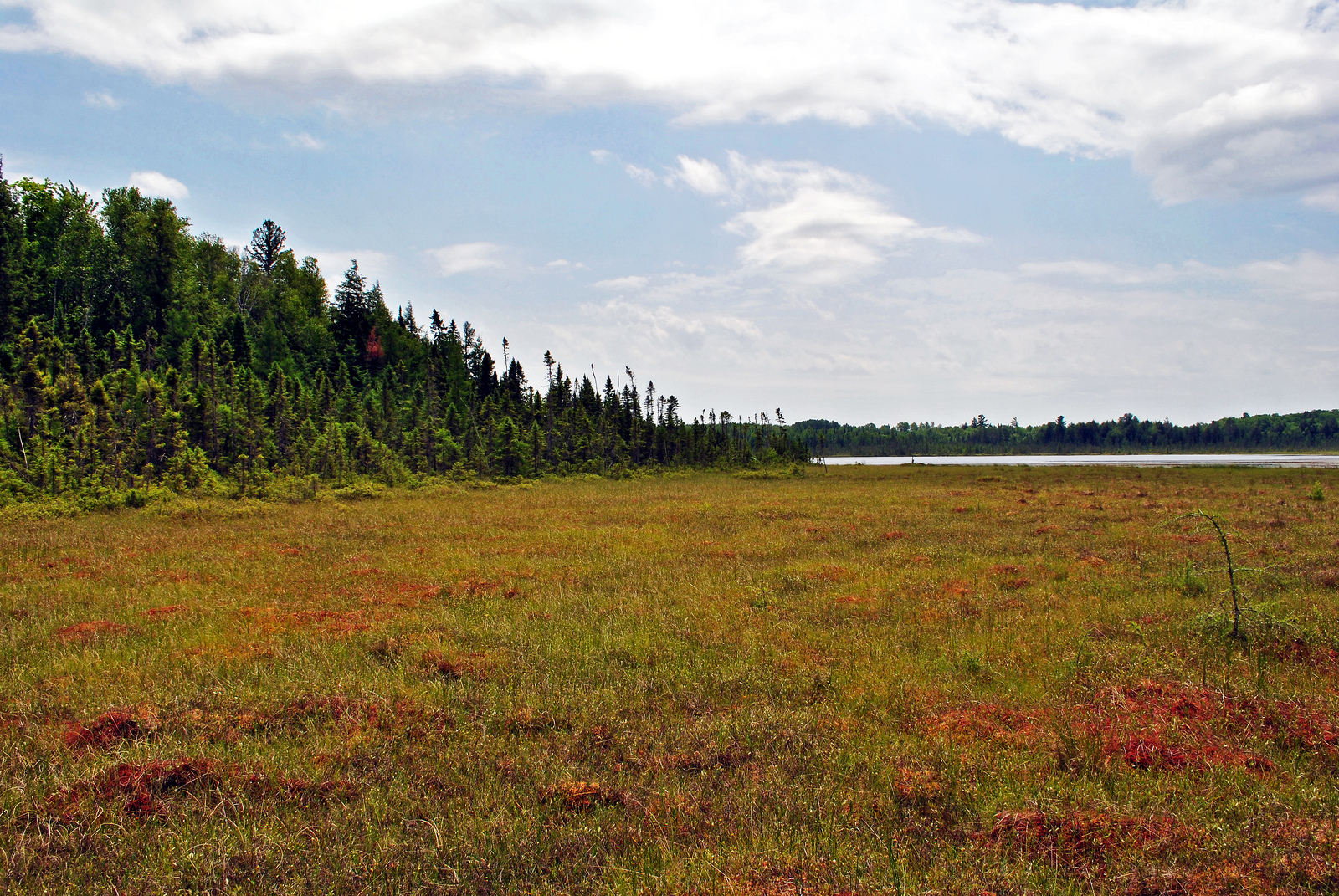
Wide, open bog mat on the northeast side of Grandma Lake

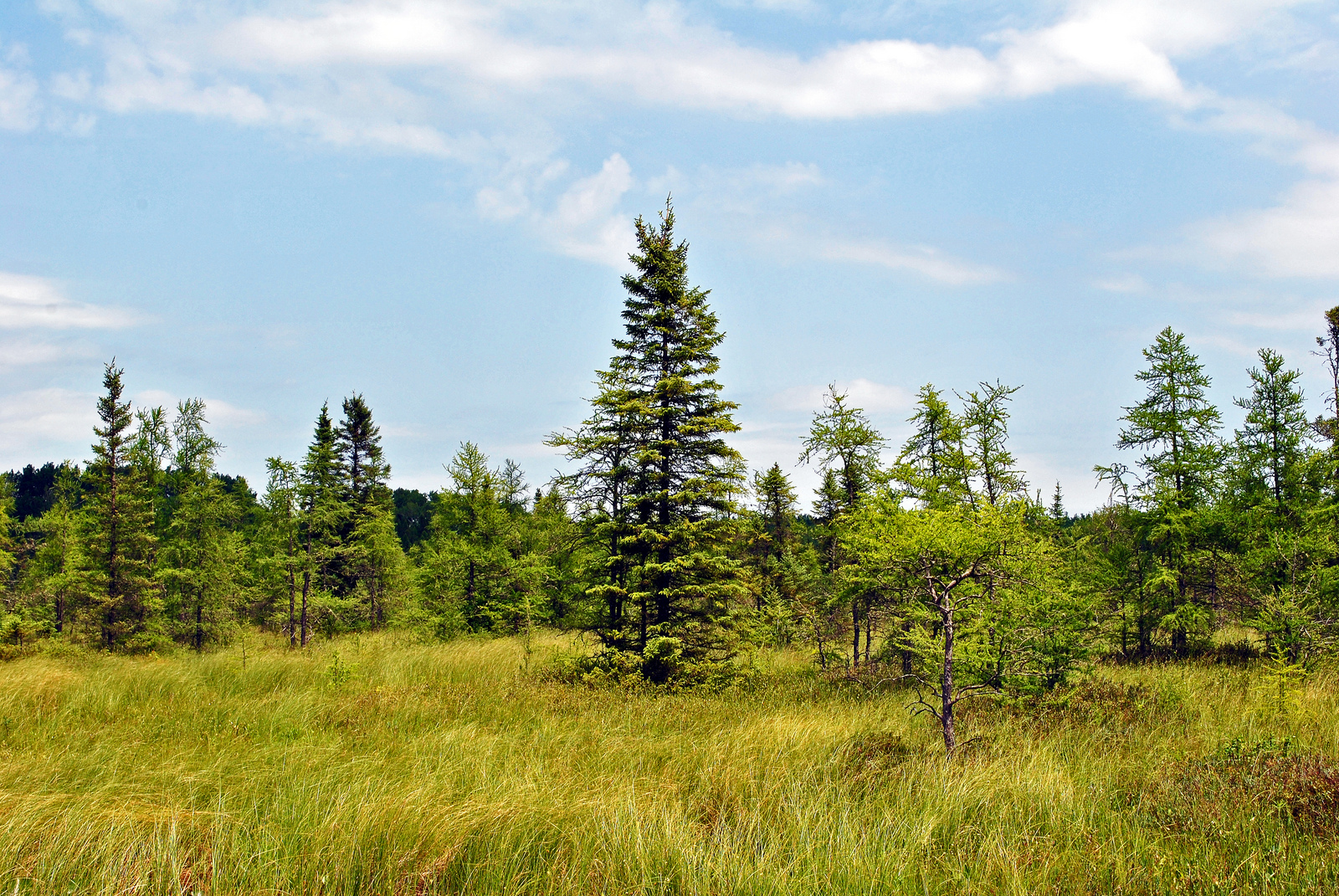
Black spruce and tamarack muskeg at the north end of Grandma Lake

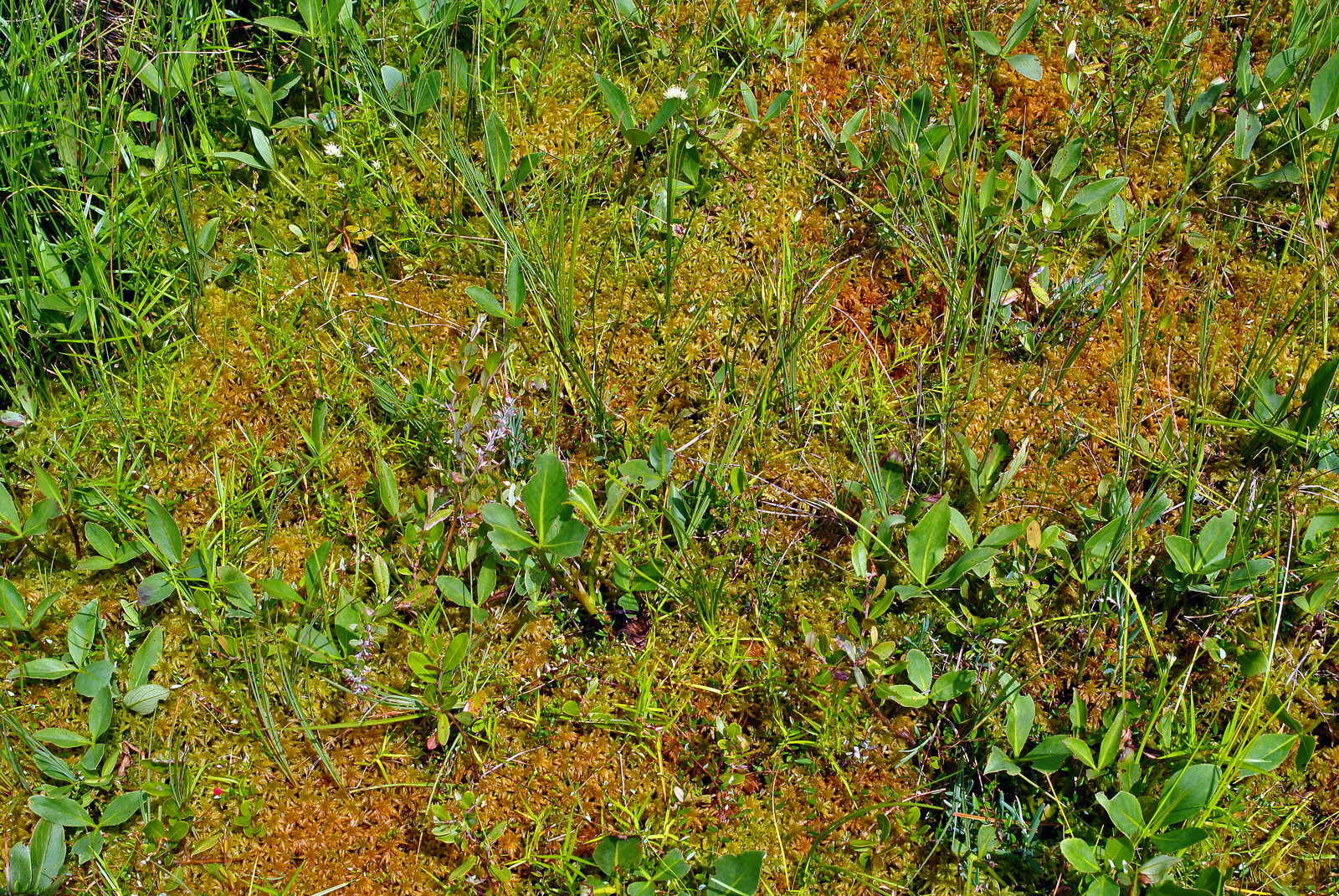
A close-up of the bog mat, near the northeast shore of Grandma Lake
