= Long Lake, Wisconsin =

Long Lake is the name of some places in the U.S. state of Wisconsin:

- Long Lake, Florence County, Wisconsin, a town
- Long Lake (CDP), Wisconsin, a census-designated place in the Florence County town
- Long Lake, Washburn County, Wisconsin, a town
