= Tipler =

Tipler may refer to:

== People ==
- Frank J. Tipler (born 1947), a mathematical physicist and cosmologist
- Frank Tipler III, a Libertarian politician in Alabama
- John Tipler, a freelance writer
- Maryanne Tipler, New Zealand mathematics textbook author

== Places ==
- Tipler (community), Wisconsin, an unincorporated community in Tipler, Wisconsin
- Tipler, Wisconsin, a town in Florence County, Wisconsin

== Other ==
- Tipler cylinder, a hypothetical object theorized to allow time travel
