= Spread Eagle Barrens State Natural Area =

Protected area in Wisconsin, US

- Location within Wisconsin Location within the United States
- Location: Florence County, Wisconsin
- Coordinates: 45°51′49″N 88°59′38″W
- Area: 7,155 acres (2,896 ha)
- Elevation: 1,122 ft (342 m)
- Established: 1995
- Owner: Wisconsin Department of Natural Resources
- Website: Official website
- Wisconsin State Natural Areas

Spread Eagle Barrens State Natural Area is a 7,155-acre (2,896 ha) protected area just off of U.S. 2 in Florence County, Wisconsin, United States. The nearest unincorporated community is Spread Eagle, Wisconsin, but the closest large city is Iron Mountain, Michigan; 6 miles (10 km) away. The Spread Eagle Barrens is owned by the Wisconsin Department of Natural Resources and the Wisconsin Energy Corporation, and was designated a State Natural Area in 1995.

In February 1993, the Natural Resources Board approved the creation of an 8,500-acre (3,400 ha) Spread Eagle Barrens State Natural Area. In August 1995, the Board approved the first purchase of land for the new natural area: 3,900 acres (1,600 ha) acres from Florence County at a cost of $1,400,000. Governor Tommy Thompson authorized the purchase in September 1995.

Despite the barrens name, many plants and animals call Spread Eagle home. The large grasslands and barrens are dominated by scattered jack pine, red pine, scrub oak, and quaking aspen trees. The open landscape is maintained by timber harvesting and controlled burns. Some of the birds that live in the area are: northern harrier, upland sandpiper, northern raven, winter wren, eastern bluebird, warbling vireo, Nashville, chestnut-sided, pine, and mourning warblers, clay-colored sparrow, common nighthawk, eastern towhee, and Brewer's blackbird. Black bears, fishers, badgers, coyotes, red foxes, and white-tailed deer are some of the animals that roam the area. There are two rivers that run through the barrens: the Pine River and the Menominee River.
