= Hematite (disambiguation) =

Hematite is the mineral form of iron oxide.

Hematite may also refer to:

- Hematite, Missouri, United States
- Hematite, Virginia, United States
- Hematite, Wisconsin, United States
- Hematite Township, Michigan, United States
- Hematites, a genus of belemnite
