= Florence (town), Wisconsin =

Florence, Wisconsin
- Town
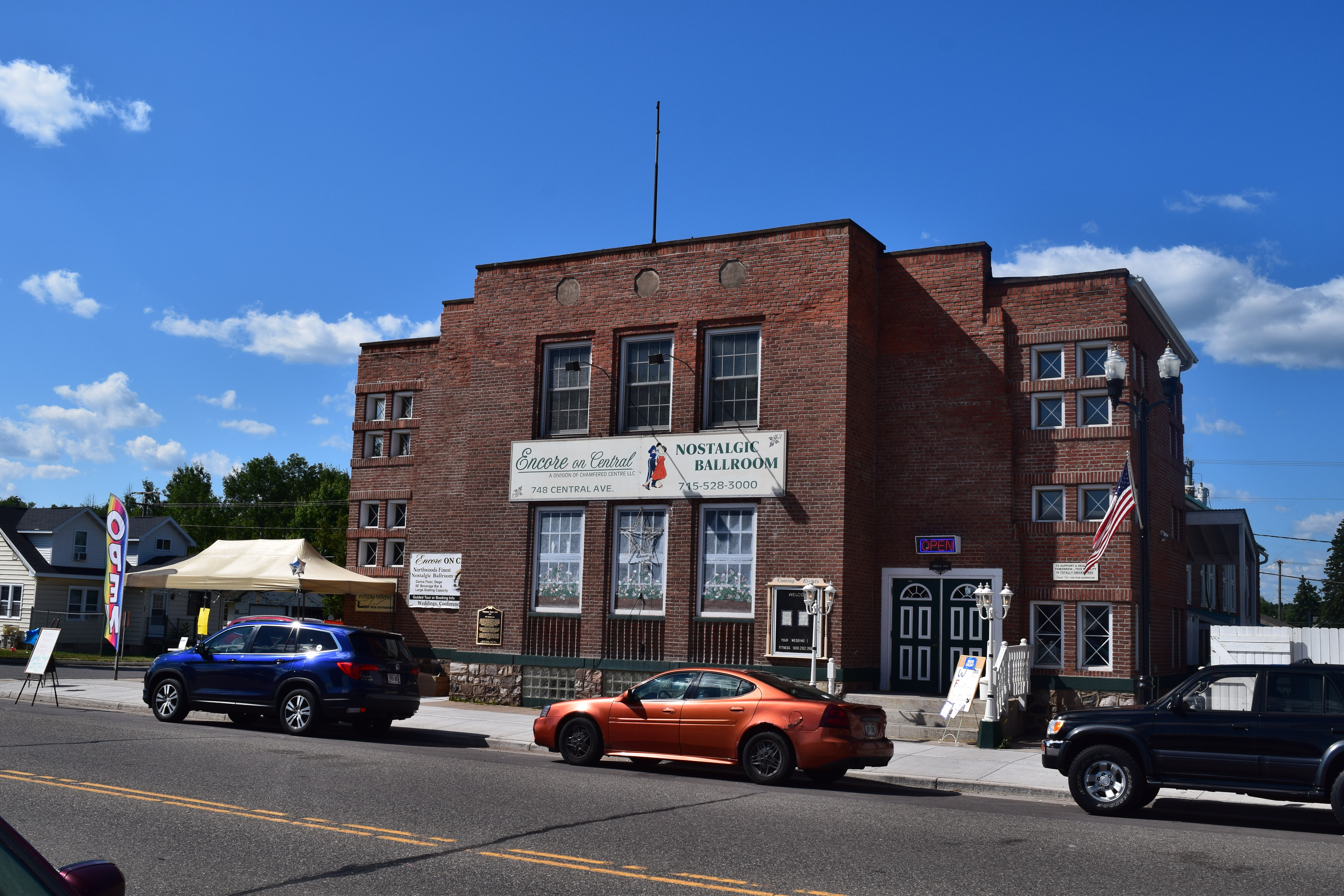
- Florence Town Hall

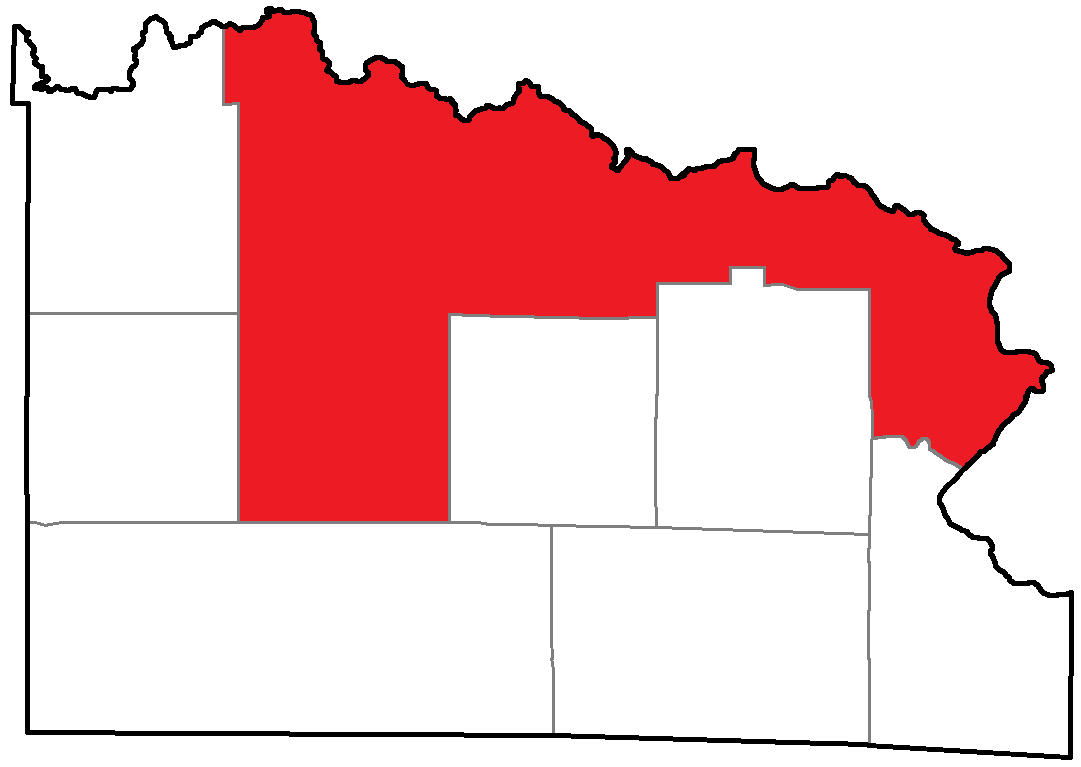
- Location of Florence, within Florence County

- Location within Wisconsin
- Coordinates: 45°54′32″N 88°16′17″W
- Country: United States
- State: Wisconsin
- County: Florence

Area
  - Total: 157.7 sq mi (408.4 km^{2})
  - Land: 153.6 sq mi (397.9 km^{2})
  - Water: 4.1 sq mi (10.5 km^{2})
- Elevation: 1,450 ft (442 m)

Population (2020)
  - Total: 2,096
  - Density: 13.64/sq mi (5.268/km^{2})
- Time zone: UTC-6 (Central (CST))
  - Summer (DST): UTC-5 (CDT)
- Area codes: 715 & 534
- FIPS code: 55-26200
- GNIS feature ID: 1583207
- Website: http://www.townofflorencewisconsin.com

Florence is a town in Florence County, Wisconsin, United States. The population was 2,096 at the 2020 census. The ZIP code is 54121. Florence is also the name of a census-designated place within the town about 11 miles (18 km) northwest of Iron Mountain, Michigan; the community is the county seat of Florence County. The unincorporated communities of Hematite, Pulp, Ridgetop, Spread Eagle, and Tyran are also located in the town.

== History ==
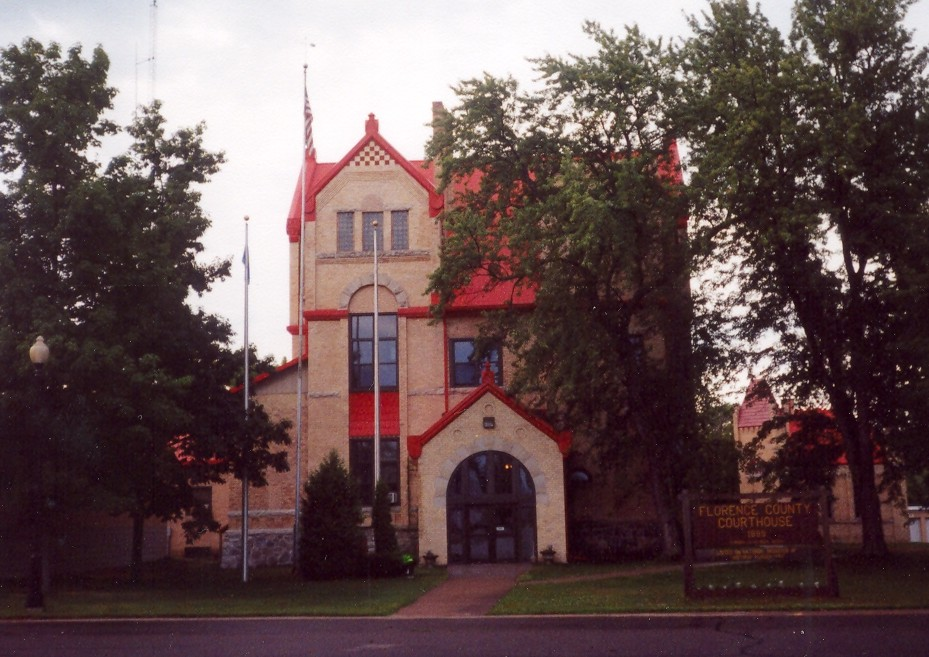
Florence County Courthouse

Florence and the area surrounding belonged to the Menominee and was a hunting and trapping region until iron was discovered there in the 1870s. The Florence Mine was discovered in October 1874 by H. D. Fisher. The mine was named in 1879 after the wife of Nelson Powell Hulst, Florence Terry Hulst.

We all wish to call the new town and the mine Florence, to honor the first white woman who had courage enough to settle (for a while) in that rugged country.

I mean the first white woman known to us.

Will you permit your name to be used?

— J. J. Hagerman, in a letter to Florence Terry Hulst (December 15, 1879)

The county subsequently took on the same name.

== Geography ==
According to the United States Census Bureau, the county has a total area of 1,282 km^{2} (495 sq mi) or 316,956 acres (1,283 km^{2})). 153.6 square miles (398 km^{2}) of it is land, 4.1 square miles (11 km^{2}) of it (2.57%) is water, and 80% is forested.

=== Highways ===
- US 2 is concurrent with US 141.
- US 141 is concurrent with US 2 through the town. North they travel to Crystal Falls south they continue into Iron Mountain.
- WIS 70 westbound connects with Eagle River.

=== Climate ===
Climate data for Florence, Wisconsin (Dec 1997–2020 normals, extremes Dec 1997-present)
Month	Jan	Feb	Mar	Apr	May	Jun	Jul	Aug	Sep	Oct	Nov	Dec	Year
Record high °F (°C)	50 (10)	61 (16)	80 (27)	83 (28)	90 (32)	99 (37)	97 (36)	95 (35)	95 (35)	84 (29)	74 (23)	61 (16)	99 (37)
Mean maximum °F (°C)	41 (5)	46 (8)	59 (15)	73 (23)	83 (28)	87 (31)	90 (32)	87 (31)	84 (29)	75 (24)	60 (16)	45 (7)	90 (32)
Mean daily maximum °F (°C)	22.4 (−5.3)	26.1 (−3.3)	37.2 (2.9)	50.1 (10.1)	64.3 (17.9)	73.0 (22.8)	78.3 (25.7)	75.9 (24.4)	68.4 (20.2)	53.7 (12.1)	40.1 (4.5)	27.2 (−2.7)	50.6 (10.3)
Daily mean °F (°C)	13.4 (−10.3)	15.2 (−9.3)	25.7 (−3.5)	38.9 (3.8)	52.2 (11.2)	61.5 (16.4)	66.6 (19.2)	64.3 (17.9)	56.9 (13.8)	43.9 (6.6)	32.2 (0.1)	19.3 (−7.1)	40.2 (4.6)
Mean daily minimum °F (°C)	4.3 (−15.4)	4.5 (−15.3)	14.2 (−9.9)	27.6 (−2.4)	40.2 (4.6)	50.0 (10.0)	54.9 (12.7)	52.7 (11.5)	45.4 (7.4)	34.0 (1.1)	24.2 (−4.3)	11.5 (−11.4)	29.8 (−1.2)
Mean minimum °F (°C)	−18 (−28)	−18 (−28)	−12 (−24)	13 (−11)	25 (−4)	34 (1)	42 (6)	39 (4)	30 (−1)	21 (−6)	6 (−14)	−10 (−23)	−22 (−30)
Record low °F (°C)	−29 (−34)	−31 (−35)	−29 (−34)	−8 (−22)	20 (−7)	28 (−2)	34 (1)	32 (0)	26 (−3)	11 (−12)	−7 (−22)	−28 (−33)	−31 (−35)
Average precipitation inches (mm)	1.01 (26)	1.09 (28)	1.36 (35)	2.65 (67)	3.32 (84)	3.92 (100)	3.87 (98)	2.91 (74)	3.57 (91)	3.52 (89)	1.70 (43)	1.48 (38)	30.61 (777)
Average snowfall inches (cm)	14.1 (36)	13.3 (34)	9.1 (23)	8.6 (22)	0.3 (0.76)	0 (0)	0 (0)	0 (0)	0 (0)	0.9 (2.3)	5.8 (15)	13.1 (33)	66.3 (168)
Average extreme snow depth inches (cm)	15 (38)	20 (51)	19 (48)	9 (23)	0 (0)	0 (0)	0 (0)	0 (0)	0 (0)	1 (2.5)	4 (10)	9 (23)	23 (58)
Average precipitation days (≥ 0.01 in)	8	6	7	10	11	11	10	10	11	12	8	8	113
Average snowy days (≥ 0.1 in)	8	6	5	3	0	0	0	0	0	1	3	7	32
Source: NOAA

== Demographics ==
Historical population
Census	Pop.	Note	%±
1890	1,709		—
1900	1,824		6.7%
1910	1,838		0.8%
1920	1,768		−3.8%
1930	1,341		−24.2%
1940	1,353		0.9%
1950	1,257		−7.1%
1960	1,251		−0.5%
1970	1,262		0.9%
1980	1,809		43.3%
1990	2,097		15.9%
2000	2,319		10.6%
2010	2,002		−13.7%
2020	2,096		4.7%
U.S. Decennial Census

As of the census of 2000, there were 2,319 people, 963 households, and 638 families residing in the town. The population density was 15.1 inhabitants per square mile (5.8/km^{2}). There were 1,724 housing units at an average density of 11.2 units per square mile (4.3 units/km^{2}). The racial makeup of the town was 98.10% White, 0.17% African American, 0.43% Native American, 0.43% Asian, 0.04% from other races, and 0.82% from two or more races. Hispanic or Latino of any race were 0.26% of the population.

There were 963 households, out of which 27.4% had children under the age of 18 living with them, 57.3% were married couples living together, 6.0% had a female householder with no husband present, and 33.7% were non-families. 29.2% of all households were made up of individuals, and 14.4% had someone living alone who was 65 years of age or older. The average household size was 2.34 and the average family size was 2.88.

In the town, the population was spread out, with 22.6% under the age of 18, 5.3% from 18 to 24, 26.3% from 25 to 44, 26.7% from 45 to 64, and 19.1% who were 65 years of age or older. The median age was 42 years. For every 100 females, there were 100.1 males. For every 100 females age 18 and over, there were 93.7 males.

The median income for a household in the town was $35,640, and the median income for a family was $42,933. Males had a median income of $31,941 versus $19,621 for females. The per capita income for the town was $18,131. About 7.6% of families and 9.7% of the population were below the poverty line, including 12.5% of those under age 18 and 7.1% of those age 65 or over.

== Economy ==
Most residents of Florence county work in nearby Iron Mountain/Kingsford, Michigan. Florence's principal industry is logging. Florence sports the largest ATV and snowmobile trail system in Wisconsin, and is a major county for those wanting to fish, hunt, or camp.

A large paper mill was built in the town in about 1889. Press reports called it the largest such facility in the United States when it was damaged by an earthquake on September 7, 1889.

== Education ==
Florence High School is the area's public high school.

== Notable people ==
- Mike Grell (born September 13, 1947) is an American comic book writer and artist, known for his work on books such as Green Lantern/Green Arrow, The Warlord, and Jon Sable Freelance.
- C. E. McIntosh, Wisconsin State Representative, lived in Florence
- Charles White Whittlesey, Medal of Honor recipient in World War I, was born in Florence
