= Commonwealth (community), Wisconsin =

Commonwealth, Wisconsin
- Unincorporated community
- Location within Wisconsin Location within the United States
- Coordinates: 45°54′49″N 88°14′24″W
- Country: United States
- State: Wisconsin
- County: Florence
- Elevation: 1,322 ft (403 m)
- Time zone: UTC-6 (Central (CST))
  - Summer (DST): UTC-5 (CDT)
- Area codes: 715 & 534
- GNIS feature ID: 1563294

Commonwealth is an unincorporated community in the town of Commonwealth, Florence County, Wisconsin, United States. Commonwealth is 1 mile (1.6 km) south of Florence.

== History ==
A post office called Commonwealth was established in 1880, and remained in operation until it was discontinued in 1953. The community was named after the nearby Commonwealth Iron Mining Company.
