= Florence Town Hall, Wisconsin =

- Florence Town Hall
- U.S. National Register of Historic Places
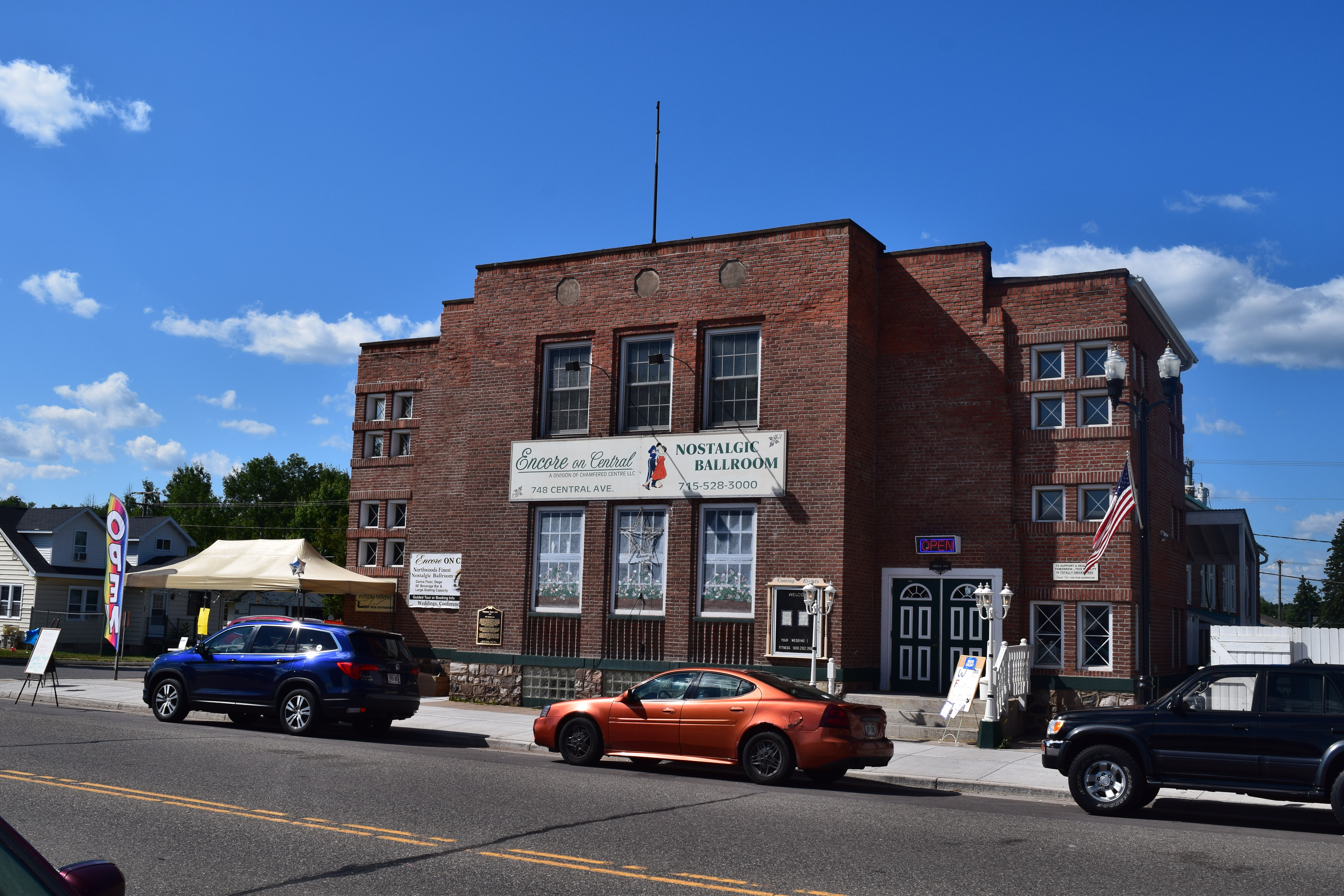
- Florence Town Hall
- Location: 748 Central Ave. Florence, Wisconsin
- Coordinates: 45.92261°N 88.25312°W
- Built: 1937
- Architect: Max L. Hansich, Sr.
- Architectural style: Streamline Moderne
- NRHP reference No.: 14000169
- Added to NRHP: April 15, 2014

The Florence Town Hall is located in the Town of Florence, Wisconsin.

== History ==
The building was constructed as a Works Progress Administration project. In addition to municipal operations, it housed an auditorium for special events. The building was added to the State Register of Historic Places in 2013 and to the National Register of Historic Places the following year.
