= Spread Eagle, Wisconsin =

- Unincorporated Community
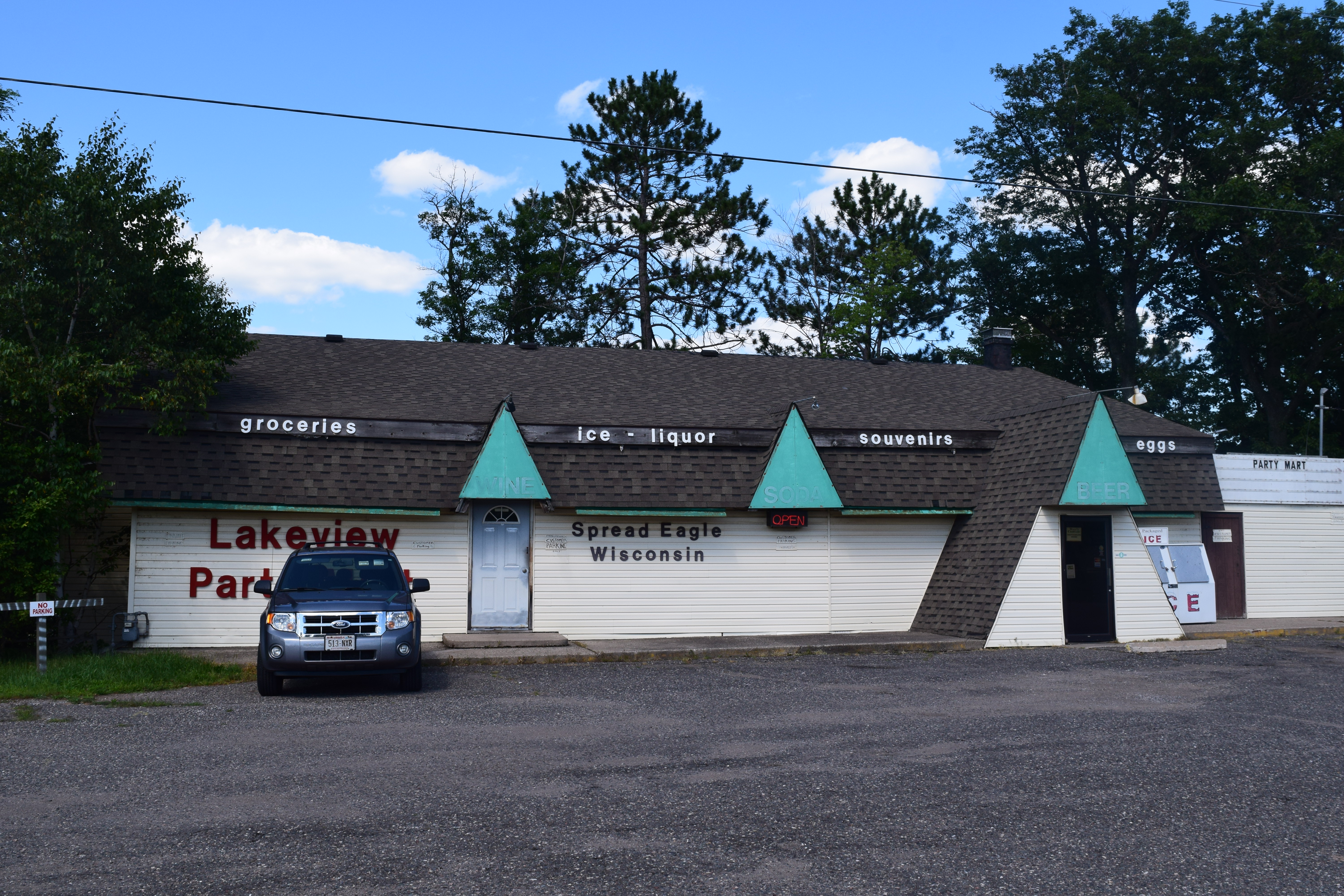
- Lakeview Party Mart in Spread Eagle

- Location in Wisconsin Location in the United States
- Coordinates: 45°52′55″N 88°8′23″W
- Country: United States
- State: Wisconsin
- County: Florence

Government
  - Type: none (governed by Town of Florence)
- Elevation: 1,197 ft (365 m)
- Time zone: UTC-6 (Central (CST))
  - Summer (DST): UTC-5 (CDT)
- ZIP code: 54121
- Area codes: 715 & 534

Spread Eagle is an unincorporated community in Florence County, in the town of Florence, in the U.S. state of Wisconsin. It is part of the Iron Mountain, MI–WI Micropolitan Statistical Area.

== Transportation ==
The community is located on U.S. Highway 141 and U.S. Highway 2, approximately six miles northwest of Iron Mountain, Michigan. It is near the southern end of Railroad Lake of the Spread Eagle Chain of Lakes.

== Attractions ==
The lake chain was named "Spread Eagle" because when seen from the sky, the chain resembles an eagle with wings spread. Spread Eagle has frequently been noted on lists of unusual place names. The Spread Eagle Barrens State Natural Area is located nearby. The Badwater Ski-Ters Water Ski Show performs during the summer.

== Notable people ==
- Lorraine Seratti, Wisconsin businesswoman and state legislator, lived in Spread Eagle.
