= Homestead, Wisconsin =

- Town
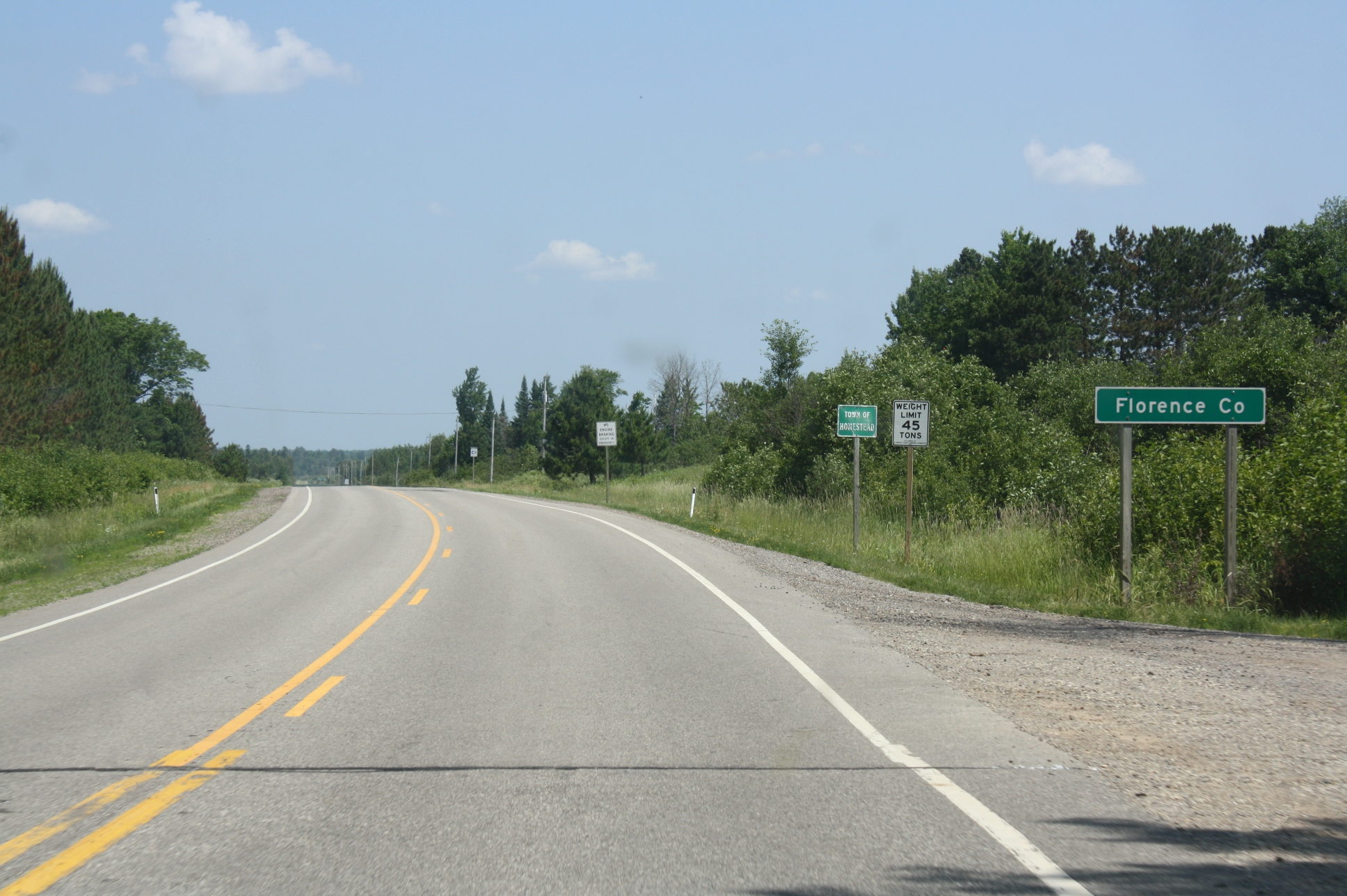
- Entering the town of Homestead

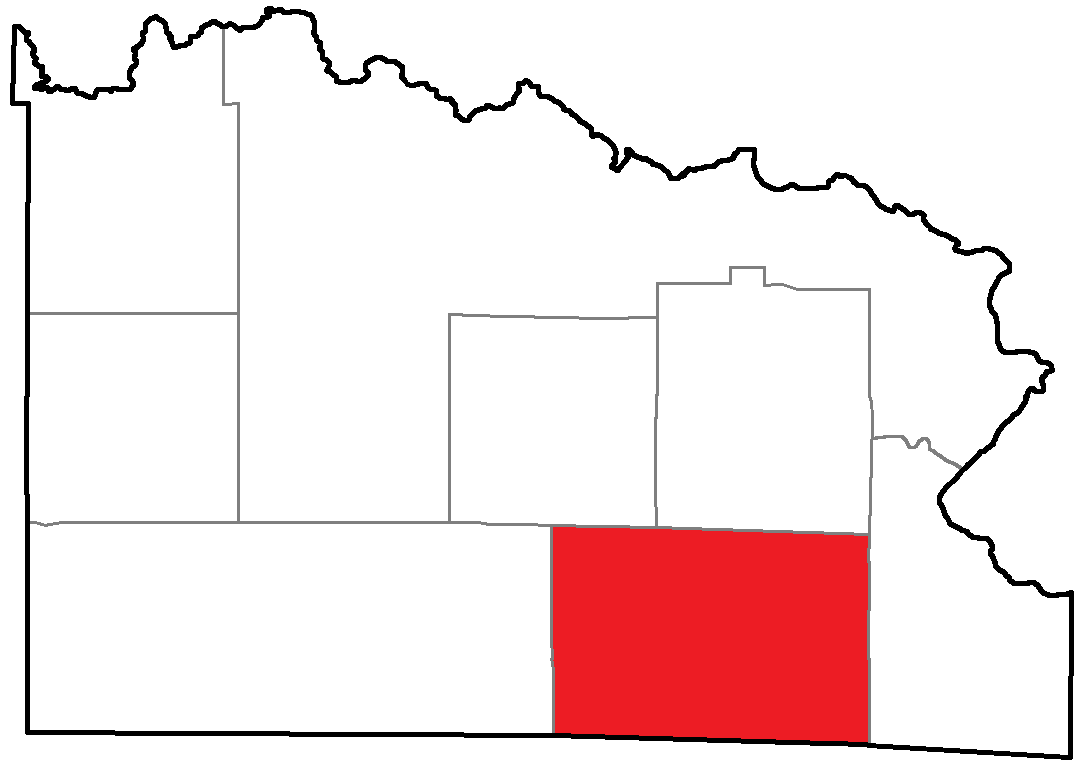
- Location of Homestead, within Florence County

- Location within Wisconsin
- Coordinates: 45°46′N 88°16′W
- Country: United States
- State: Wisconsin
- County: Florence

Area
  - Total: 54.3 sq mi (140.7 km^{2})
  - Land: 53.9 sq mi (139.5 km^{2})
  - Water: 0.46 sq mi (1.2 km^{2})
- Elevation: 1,306 ft (398 m)

Population (2020)
  - Total: 383
  - Density: 7.11/sq mi (2.75/km^{2})
- Time zone: UTC-6 (Central (CST))
  - Summer (DST): UTC-5 (CDT)
- Area codes: 715 & 534
- FIPS code: 55-35600
- GNIS feature ID: 1583407

Homestead is a town in Florence County, Wisconsin, United States. The population was 383 at the 2020 census.

== Geography ==
According to the United States Census Bureau, the town has a total area of 54.3 square miles (140.7 km^{2}), of which 53.9 square miles (139.5 km^{2}) is land and 0.5 square mile (1.2 km^{2}) (0.87%) is water.

== Demographics ==
Historical population
Census	Pop.	Note	%±
1900	545		—
1910	840		54.1%
1920	405		−51.8%
1930	351		−13.3%
1940	383		9.1%
1950	348		−9.1%
1960	302		−13.2%
1970	258		−14.6%
1980	272		5.4%
1990	337		23.9%
2000	378		12.2%
2010	336		−11.1%
2020	383		14.0%
U.S. Decennial Census

As of the census of 2000, there were 378 people, 158 households, and 109 families residing in the town. The population density was 7.0 inhabitants per square mile (2.7/km^{2}). There were 351 housing units at an average density of 6.5 per square mile (2.5/km^{2}). The racial makeup of the town was 98.68% White, 0.26% Native American, 0.26% Asian, 0.26% Pacific Islander, and 0.53% from two or more races.

There were 158 households, out of which 30.4% had children under the age of 18 living with them, 62.7% were married couples living together, 3.8% had a female householder with no husband present, and 30.4% were non-families. 26.6% of all households were made up of individuals, and 9.5% had someone living alone who was 65 years of age or older. The average household size was 2.39 and the average family size was 2.92.

In the town, the population was spread out, with 22.8% under the age of 18, 5.6% from 18 to 24, 27.5% from 25 to 44, 30.7% from 45 to 64, and 13.5% who were 65 years of age or older. The median age was 42 years. For every 100 females, there were 103.2 males. For every 100 females age 18 and over, there were 111.6 males.

The median income for a household in the town was $31,944, and the median income for a family was $40,000. Males had a median income of $31,250 versus $22,857 for females. The per capita income for the town was $21,491. About 1.8% of families and 4.2% of the population were below the poverty line, including 4.7% of those under age 18 and 4.4% of those age 65 or over.
