= Commonwealth, Wisconsin =

- Town
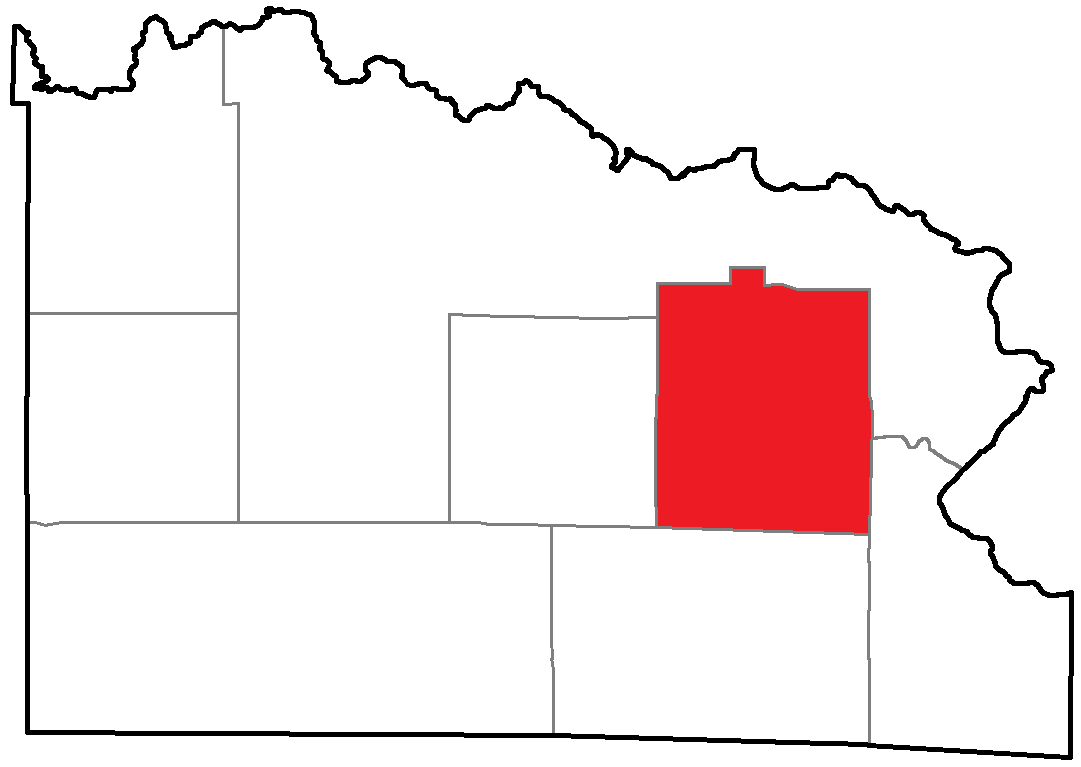
- Location of Commonwealth, within Florence County

- Location within Wisconsin
- Coordinates: 45°52′25″N 88°16′24″W
- Country: United States
- State: Wisconsin
- County: Florence

Area
  - Total: 42.9 sq mi (111.2 km^{2})
  - Land: 42.3 sq mi (109.6 km^{2})
  - Water: 0.62 sq mi (1.6 km^{2})
- Elevation: 1,234 ft (376 m)

Population (2020)
  - Total: 390
  - Density: 9.2/sq mi (3.6/km^{2})
- Time zone: UTC-6 (Central (CST))
  - Summer (DST): UTC-5 (CDT)
- Area codes: 715 & 534
- FIPS code: 55-16550
- GNIS feature ID: 1583008

Commonwealth is a town in Florence County, Wisconsin, United States. The population was 390 at the 2020 census. The unincorporated community of Commonwealth is located in the town.

== Geography ==
According to the United States Census Bureau, the town has a total area of 42.9 square miles (111.2 km^{2}), of which 42.3 square miles (109.6 km^{2}) is land and 0.6 square mile (1.6 km^{2}) (1.42%) is water.

== Demographics ==
Historical population
Census	Pop.	Note	%±
1890	895		—
1900	828		−7.5%
1910	697		−15.8%
1920	572		−17.9%
1930	182		−68.2%
1940	340		86.8%
1950	328		−3.5%
1960	314		−4.3%
1970	254		−19.1%
1980	369		45.3%
1990	407		10.3%
2000	419		2.9%
2010	399		−4.8%
2020	390		−2.3%
U.S. Decennial Census

As of the census of 2000, there were 419 people, 170 households, and 124 families residing in the town. The population density was 9.9 inhabitants per square mile (3.8/km^{2}). There were 326 housing units at an average density of 7.7 per square mile (3.0/km^{2}). The racial makeup of the town was 98.57% White, and 1.43% from two or more races.

There were 170 households, out of which 31.8% had children under the age of 18 living with them, 64.1% were married couples living together, 7.6% had a female householder with no husband present, and 26.5% were non-families. 21.8% of all households were made up of individuals, and 8.2% had someone living alone who was 65 years of age or older. The average household size was 2.46 and the average family size was 2.89.

In the town, the population was spread out, with 23.9% under the age of 18, 6.4% from 18 to 24, 29.8% from 25 to 44, 24.6% from 45 to 64, and 15.3% who were 65 years of age or older. The median age was 40 years. For every 100 females, there were 105.4 males. For every 100 females age 18 and over, there were 105.8 males.

The median income for a household in the town was $38,015, and the median income for a family was $39,659. Males had a median income of $31,250 versus $23,571 for females. The per capita income for the town was $19,137. About 5.4% of families and 6.4% of the population were below the poverty line, including 8.0% of those under age 18 and 8.8% of those age 65 or over.
