= Nelson Powell Hulst =

American mining industrialist

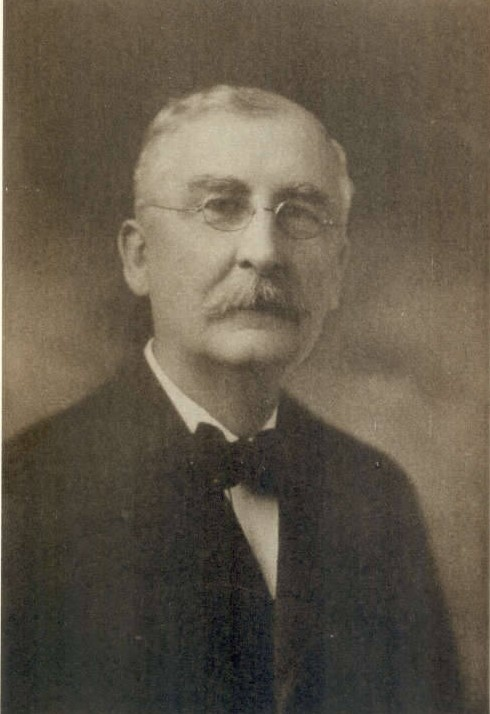
- Born: February 8, 1842; Brooklyn, New York
- Died: January 11, 1923 (aged 80); Milwaukee, Wisconsin
- Spouse: Florence Terry Hulst
- Children: 5
- Parent(s): Garrett Hulst, Nancy Powell

Nelson Powell Hulst (February 8, 1842 - January 11, 1923) was an industrialist, engineer, chemist, and a leader in the development of the Menominee Iron Range. He discovered and developed six major mines in Upper Michigan (Vulcan, Cyclops, Norway, Quinnesec, Chapin, and Pewabic) and one in Florence, Wisconsin. By the time of his retirement, Hulst was vice-president of U.S. Steel in charge of mining operations in the Midwest and had held many executive positions in various mining companies.

== Biography ==
=== Early life ===
Nelson Powell Hulst was born in 1842 in the Bushwick neighborhood of Brooklyn. In 1857, his family moved to Alexandria, Virginia, where Hulst attended a small Quaker private school. He subsequently attended a Quaker school in Sandy Spring, Maryland.

Prior to his entry to Yale, Hulst was recommended to President Lincoln for appointment to the United States Naval Academy at Annapolis. Him and his father had met Lincoln, but an appointment that was promised to a young Hulst by the president never came to fruition.

=== Yale and Career After Graduation ===
Hulst attended Yale College from 1863 to 1867 and graduated with a Bachelor of Arts. He subsequently attended Sheffield Scientific School and in 1870 received his PhD. In that same year, he accepted a position at the Milwaukee Iron Company in Milwaukee, Wisconsin, as a chemist and technical engineer. The plant was closed by 1878. By then, Hulst and others had organized the Menominee Mining Company and were looking to continue pursuing iron further in the Menominee Iron Range in the Upper Peninsula of Michigan.

At the time of his retirement in 1904, Hulst was vice-president in charge of mining properties for the United States Steel Corporation. Hulst's career in mining was said to have two milestones: the discovery of the Chapin mine in Iron Mountain, Michigan, in 1879 and the discovery of the Pewabic mine, which began producing in 1887.

=== Death ===
Nelson Powell Hulst died January 11, 1923, in Milwaukee, Wisconsin. He was buried in Forest Home Cemetery in Milwaukee. At the time of his death, Hulst was said to be "the greatest American authority on iron".

== Recognition ==
From 1891 to 1892, a school named N. P. Hulst High School and usually referred to as "Hulst School" was built on Madison Avenue in Iron Mountain, Michigan. The building was razed in 1949. A residential building was later built on the property and was given the name "Hulst Manor" after Hulst. A memorial to Hulst School also stands on the site.

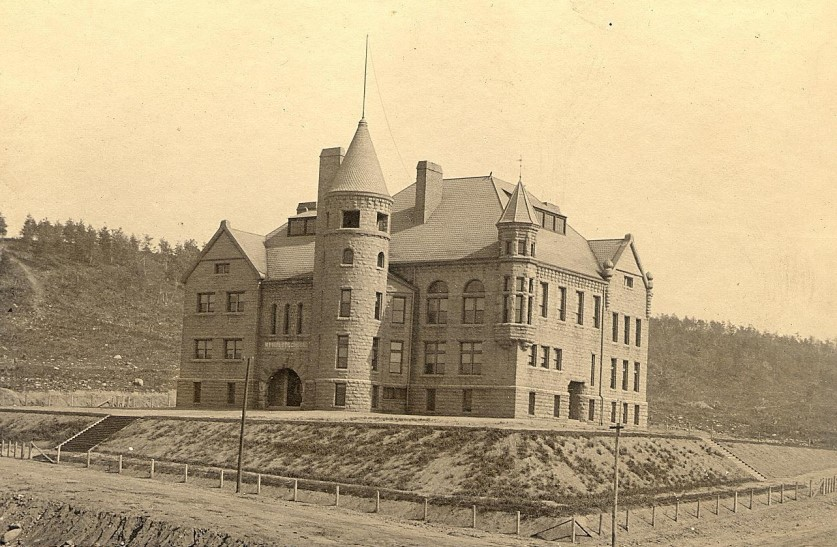
N. P. Hulst High School circa 1892

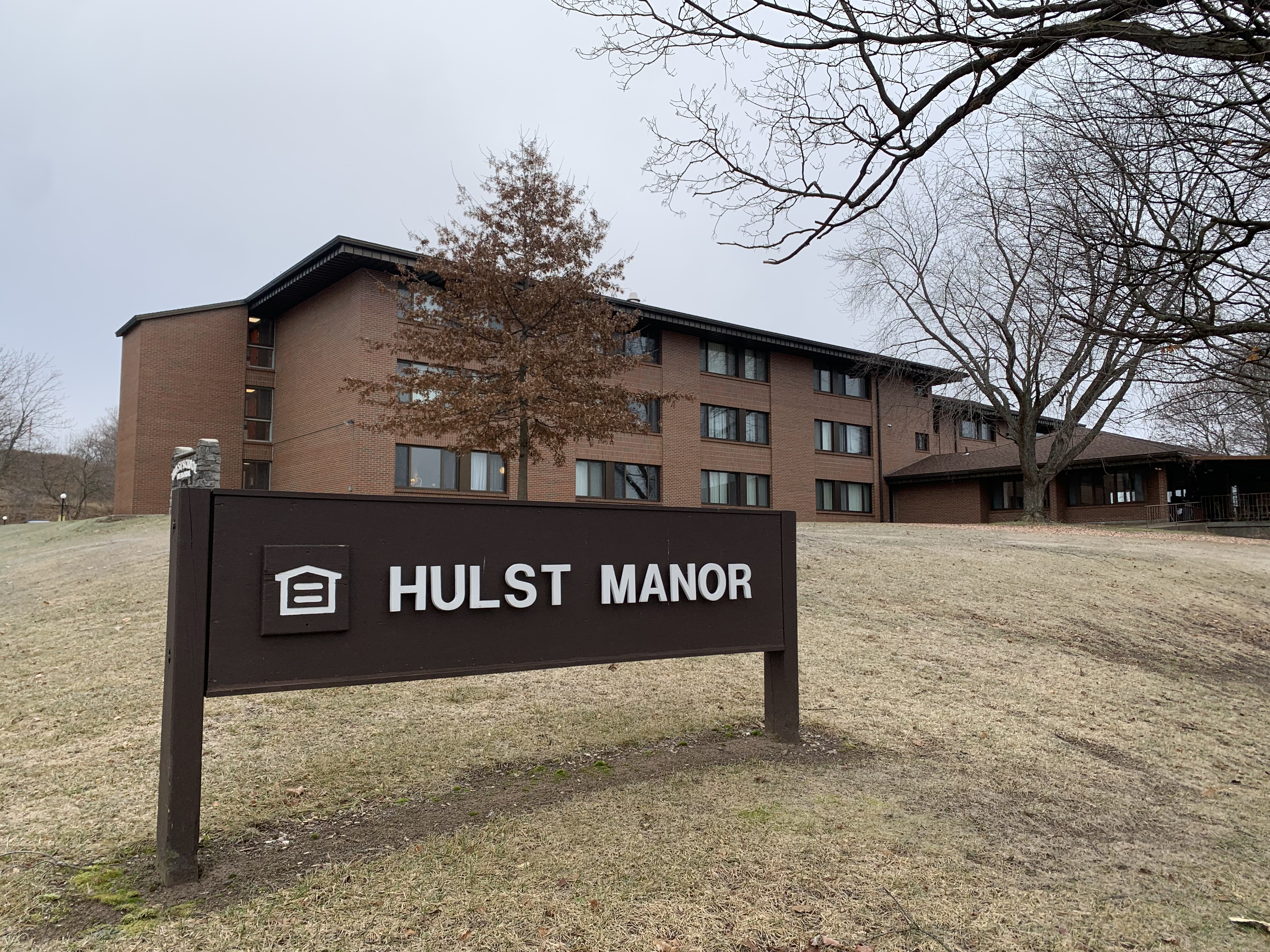
Hulst Manor in 2023

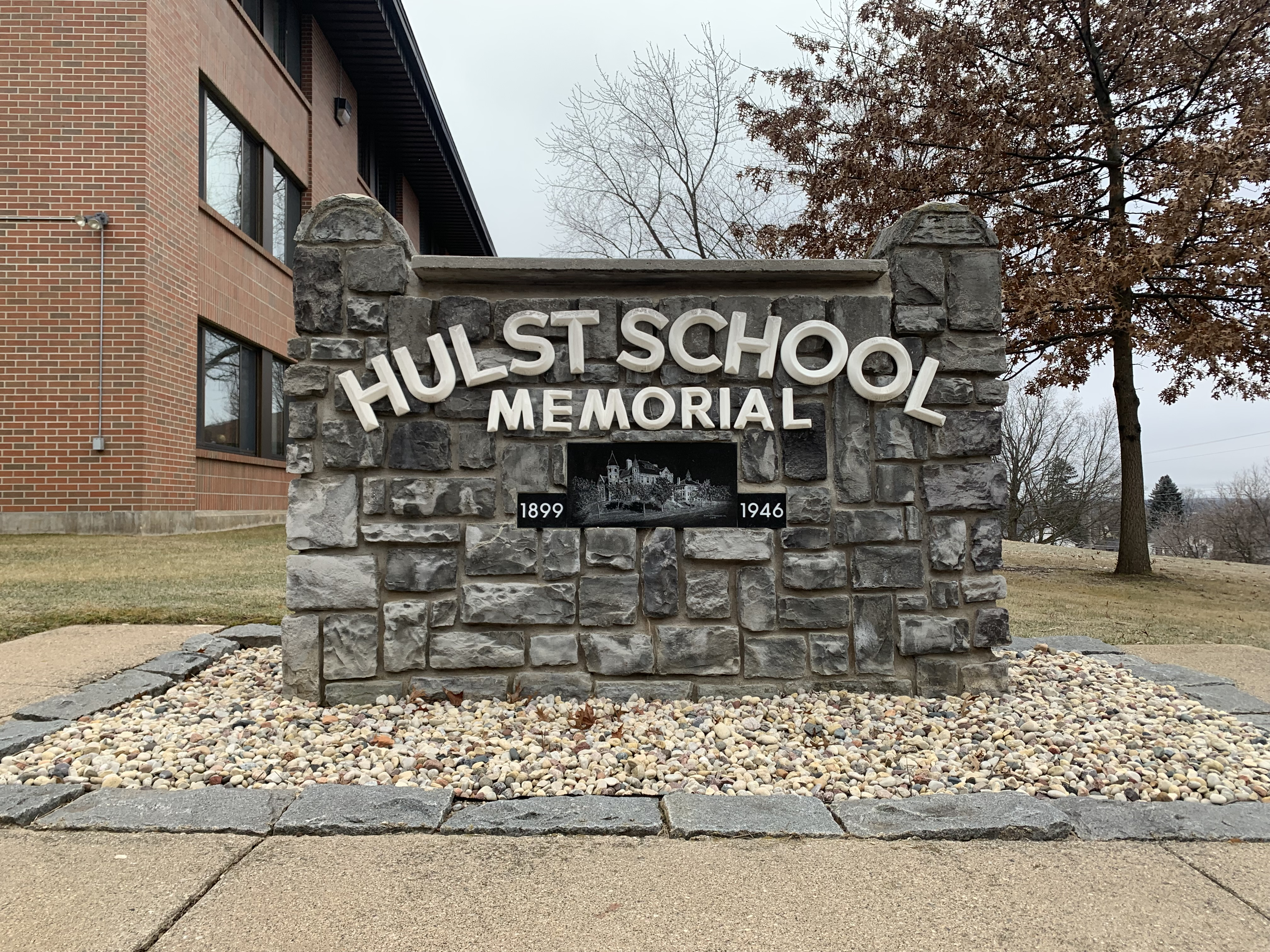
A memorial to Hulst School on the site of Hulst Manor
