= Florence County, Wisconsin =

County in Wisconsin, United States

- County
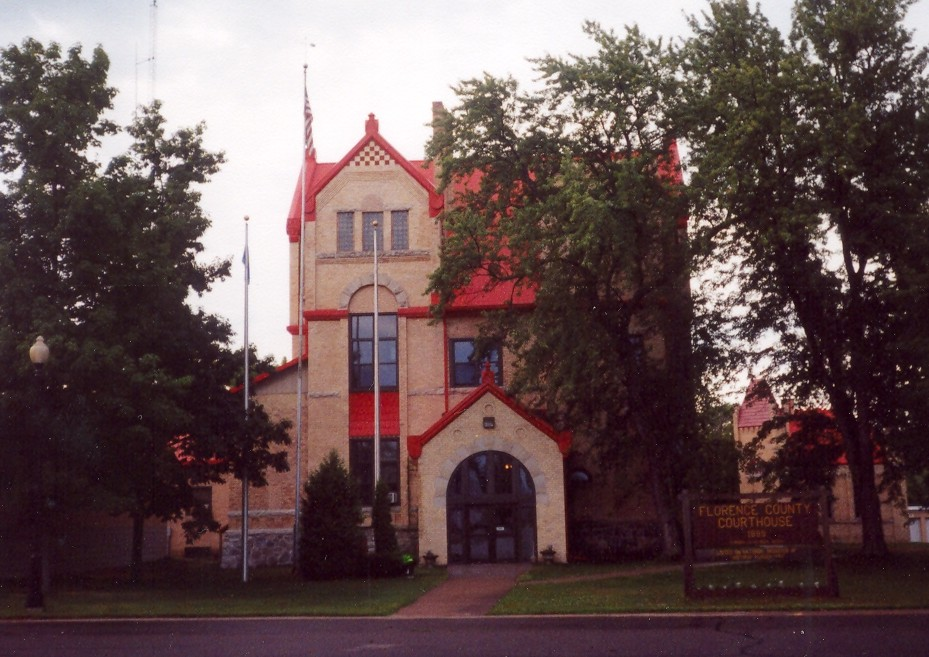
- Florence County Courthouse

- Location within the U.S. state of Wisconsin
- Coordinates: 45°51′N 88°24′W
- Country: United States
- State: Wisconsin
- Founded: 1882
- Named for: Florence Terry Hulst
- Seat: Florence
- Largest town: Florence

Area
  - Total: 498 sq mi (1,290 km^{2})
  - Land: 488 sq mi (1,260 km^{2})
  - Water: 9.3 sq mi (24 km^{2}) 1.9%

Population (2020)
  - Total: 4,558
  - Estimate (2025): 4,748 ▲
  - Density: 9.3/sq mi (3.6/km^{2})
- Time zone: UTC−6 (Central)
  - Summer (DST): UTC−5 (CDT)
- Congressional district: 7th
- Website: www.florencecountywi.com

Florence County is a county in the U.S. state of Wisconsin. As of the 2020 census, the population was 4,558, making it the second-least populous county in Wisconsin after Menominee County. Its county seat is Florence. The county is considered a high-recreation retirement destination by the U.S. Department of Agriculture.

Florence County is part of the Iron Mountain, MI–WI Micropolitan Statistical Area.

== History ==
Florence County was created by the legislature of 1882 from portions of Marinette County and Oconto County. The first white man to document his journey through Florence County was Thomas J. Cram, who surveyed northeast Wisconsin in 1840 and 1841. The region belonged to the Menominee tribe, who mingled with the Chippewa there. Florence County continued to be a region for hunting and trapping until the 1870s when iron was discovered in the region. The Florence mine was discovered in 1874 by H. D. Fisher. In 1879, Fisher named the mine and town after the wife of Nelson Powell Hulst, Florence Terry Hulst, establishing the name for the county as well.

== Geography ==
According to the U.S. Census Bureau, the county has a total area of 498 square miles (1,290 km^{2}), of which 488 square miles (1,260 km^{2}) is land and 9.3 square miles (24 km^{2}) (1.9%) is water.

=== Adjacent counties ===
- Iron County, Michigan – north
- Dickinson County, Michigan – east
- Marinette County – southeast
- Forest County – southwest

=== Major highways ===
- U.S. Highway 2
- U.S. Highway 141
- Highway 70
- Highway 101
- Highway 139

=== National protected area ===
- Nicolet National Forest (part)

== Demographics ==
Historical population
Census	Pop.	Note	%±
1890	2,604		—
1900	3,197		22.8%
1910	3,381		5.8%
1920	3,602		6.5%
1930	3,768		4.6%
1940	4,177		10.9%
1950	3,756		−10.1%
1960	3,437		−8.5%
1970	3,298		−4.0%
1980	4,172		26.5%
1990	4,590		10.0%
2000	5,088		10.8%
2010	4,423		−13.1%
2020	4,558		3.1%
2025 (est.)	4,748	▲	4.2%
U.S. Decennial Census; 1790–1960 1900–1990; 1990–2000 2010–2020

=== Racial and ethnic composition ===
Florence County, Wisconsin – Racial and ethnic composition Note: the US Census treats Hispanic/Latino as an ethnic category. This table excludes Latinos from the racial categories and assigns them to a separate category. Hispanics/Latinos may be of any race.
Race / ethnicity (NH = Non-Hispanic)	Pop 1980	Pop 1990	Pop 2000	Pop 2010	Pop 2020	% 1980	% 1990	% 2000	% 2010	% 2020
White alone (NH)	4,124	4,556	4,981	4,287	4,296	98.85%	99.26%	97.90%	96.93%	94.25%
Black or African American alone (NH)	9	4	8	10	9	0.22%	0.09%	0.16%	0.23%	0.20%
Native American or Alaska Native alone (NH)	14	14	22	30	30	0.34%	0.31%	0.43%	0.68%	0.66%
Asian alone (NH)	8	4	13	13	5	0.19%	0.09%	0.26%	0.29%	0.11%
Native Hawaiian or Pacific Islander alone (NH)	x	x	1	1	4	x	x	0.02%	0.02%	0.09%
Other race alone (NH)	3	1	0	0	11	0.07%	0.02%	0.00%	0.00%	0.24%
Mixed race or Multiracial (NH)	x	x	40	45	137	x	x	0.79%	1.02%	3.01%
Hispanic or Latino (any race)	14	11	23	37	66	0.34%	0.24%	0.45%	0.84%	1.45%
Total	4,172	4,590	5,088	4,423	4,558	100.00%	100.00%	100.00%	100.00%	100.00%

=== 2020 census ===
As of the 2020 census, the county had a population of 4,558. The population density was 9.3 people per square mile (3.6 people/km^{2}) and there were 4,601 housing units at an average density of 9.4 units per square mile (3.6 units/km^{2}). The racial makeup of the county was 94.6% White, 0.2% Black or African American, 0.7% American Indian and Alaska Native, 0.2% Asian, 0.2% Native Hawaiian and Pacific Islander, 0.3% from some other race, and 3.9% from two or more races. Hispanic or Latino residents of any race comprised 1.4% of the population.

The median age was 55.5 years, with 15.6% of residents under the age of 18 and 28.7% of residents 65 years of age or older. For every 100 females there were 107.7 males, and for every 100 females age 18 and over there were 108.1 males age 18 and over.

There were 2,152 households in the county, of which 17.1% had children under the age of 18 living in them. Of all households, 51.2% were married-couple households, 23.1% were households with a male householder and no spouse or partner present, and 19.1% were households with a female householder and no spouse or partner present. About 33.1% of all households were made up of individuals and 16.1% had someone living alone who was 65 years of age or older.

Of the 4,601 housing units, 53.2% were vacant. Among occupied housing units, 86.2% were owner-occupied and 13.8% were renter-occupied. The homeowner vacancy rate was 1.7% and the rental vacancy rate was 9.3%.

Less than 0.1% of residents lived in urban areas, while 100.0% lived in rural areas.

=== 2000 census ===
2000 Census Age Pyramid for Florence County

At the 2000 census there were 5,088 people, 2,133 households, and 1,441 families in the county. The population density was 10 people per square mile (3.9 people/km^{2}). There were 4,239 housing units at an average density of 9 units per square mile (3.5 units/km^{2}). The racial makeup of the county was 98.17% White, 0.16% Black or African American, 0.43% Native American, 0.28% Asian, 0.02% Pacific Islander, 0.14% from other races, and 0.81% from two or more races. 0.45% of the population were Hispanic or Latino of any race. 25.6% were of German, 11.6% Swedish, 8.4% Polish, 8.2% Italian, 6.6% French, 5.9% English, 5.4% French Canadian and 5.2% Irish ancestry. Of the 2,133 households 27.50% had children under the age of 18 living with them, 58.60% were married couples living together, 6.00% had a female householder with no husband present, and 32.40% were non-families. 27.90% of households were one person and 12.50% were one person aged 65 or older. The average household size was 2.35 and the average family size was 2.87.

The age distribution was 22.90% under the age of 18, 5.30% from 18 to 24, 27.10% from 25 to 44, 27.30% from 45 to 64, and 17.50% 65 or older. The median age was 42 years. For every 100 females, there were 104.30 males. For every 100 females age 18 and over, there were 101.50 males.

In 2017, there were 31 births, giving a general fertility rate of 57.9 births per 1000 women aged 15–44, the 21st lowest rate out of all 72 Wisconsin counties. 10 of the births were to unmarried mothers, 21 were to married mothers. Additionally, there were fewer than five reported induced abortions performed on women of Florence County residence in 2017.

== Communities ==
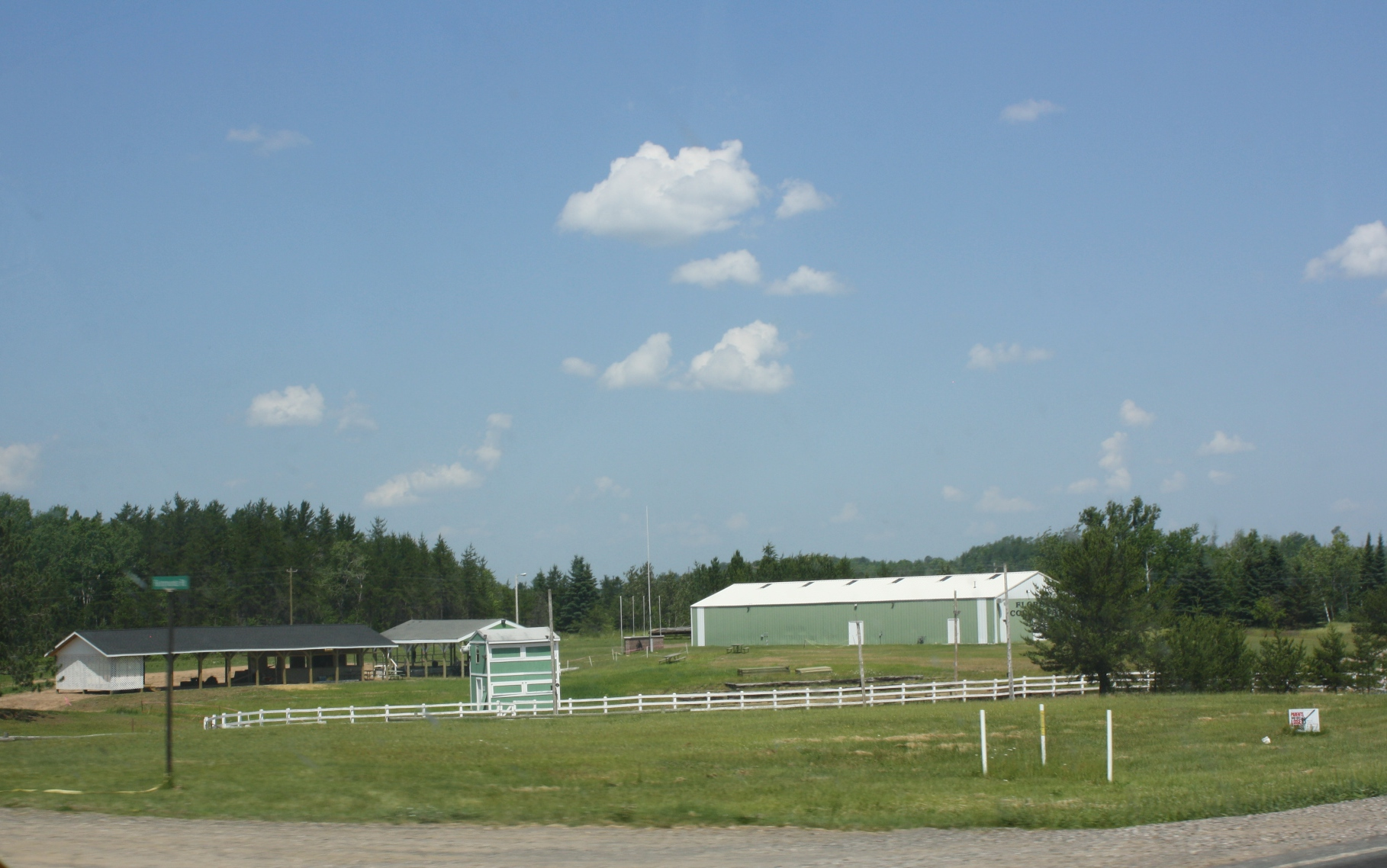
Fairgrounds

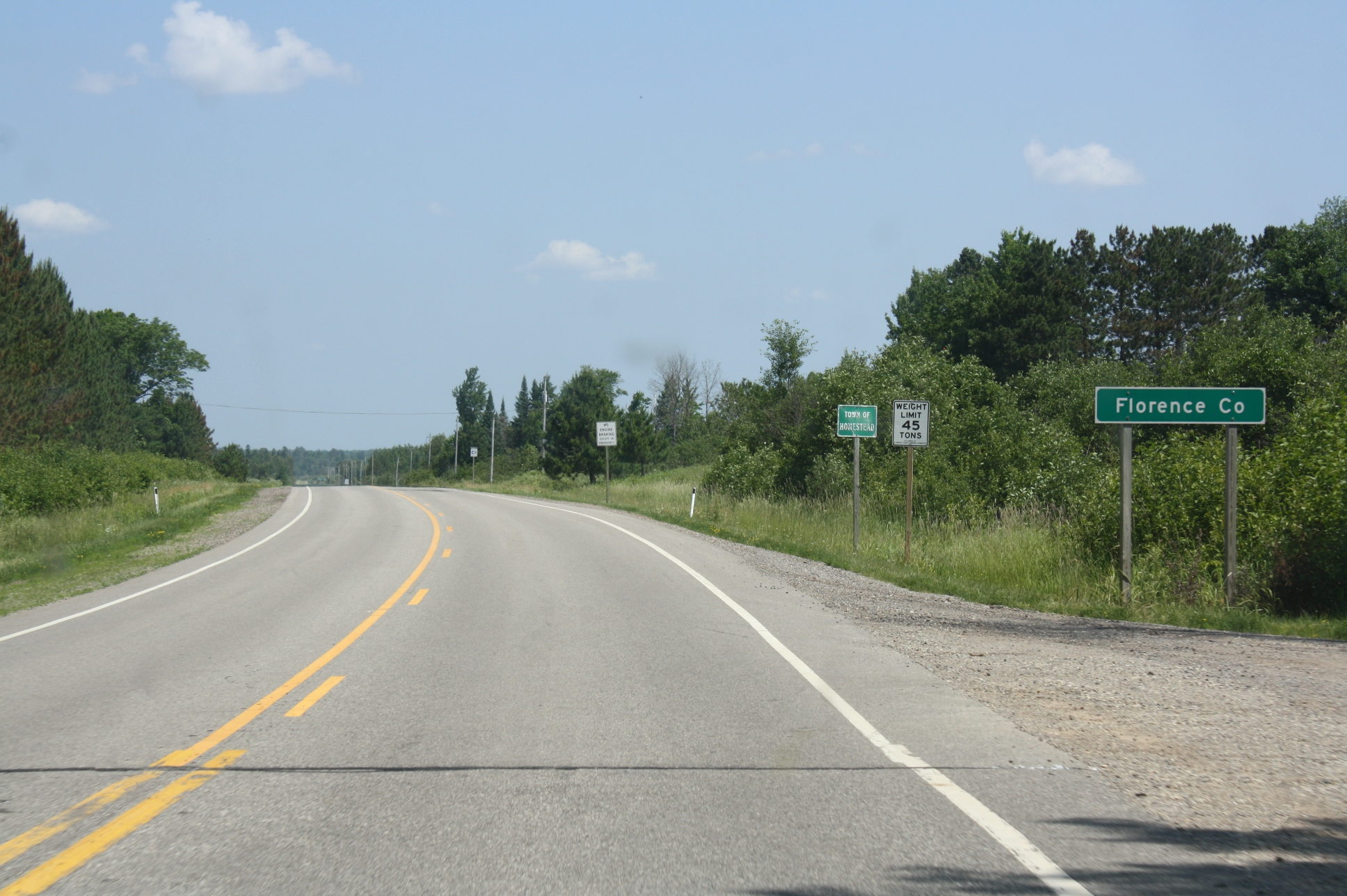
Florence County sign

Florence County is one of only two counties in Wisconsin with no incorporated communities, the other being Menominee County.

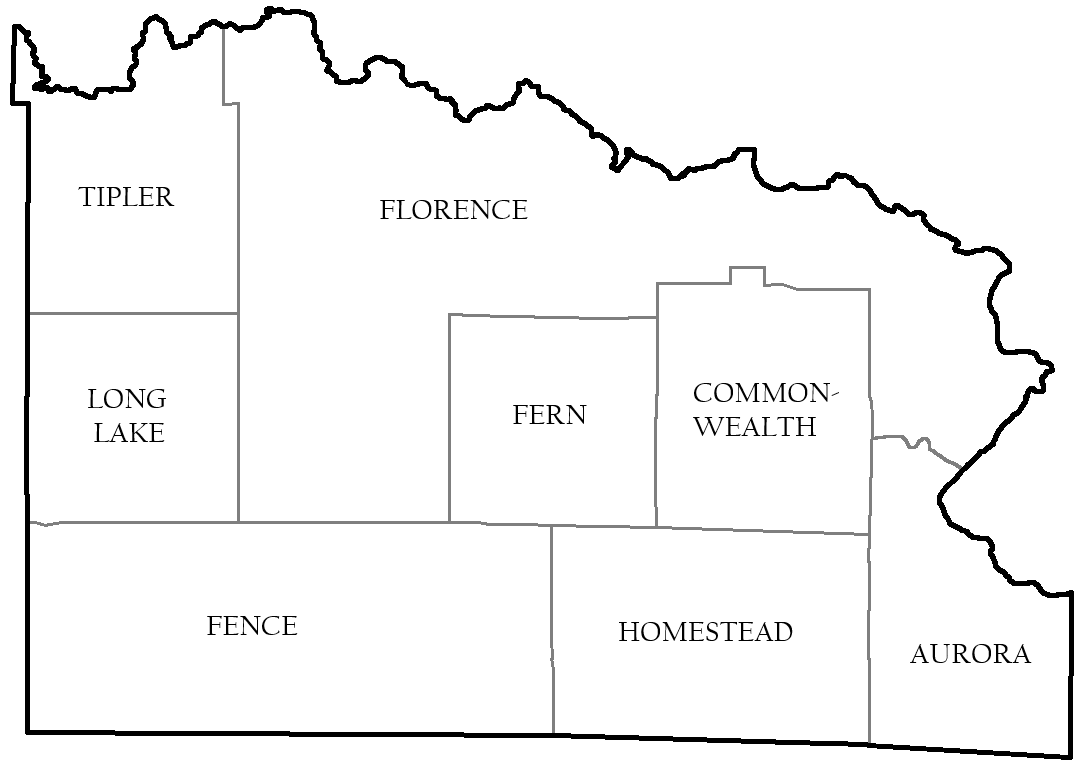
Towns of Florence County

=== Towns ===
- Aurora
- Commonwealth
- Fence
- Fern
- Florence
- Homestead
- Long Lake
- Tipler

=== Census-designated places ===
- Florence
- Long Lake

=== Unincorporated communities ===
- Commonwealth
- Hematite
- Spread Eagle
- Tipler

== Politics ==
Florence County has voted for the Republican presidential candidate in every election since 1996.

United States presidential election results for Florence County, Wisconsin
Year	Republican		Democratic		Third party(ies)	
Year	No.	%	No.	%	No.	%
1892	449	67.93%	195	29.50%	17	2.57%
1896	488	78.08%	129	20.64%	8	1.28%
1900	514	79.57%	110	17.03%	22	3.41%
1904	562	85.41%	83	12.61%	13	1.98%
1908	541	81.11%	102	15.29%	24	3.60%
1912	262	43.67%	131	21.83%	207	34.50%
1916	412	69.36%	162	27.27%	20	3.37%
1920	912	86.94%	97	9.25%	40	3.81%
1924	594	50.21%	49	4.14%	540	45.65%
1928	993	64.27%	540	34.95%	12	0.78%
1932	714	40.94%	965	55.33%	65	3.73%
1936	800	41.41%	1,037	53.67%	95	4.92%
1940	1,008	50.12%	980	48.73%	23	1.14%
1944	765	45.59%	897	53.46%	16	0.95%
1948	756	43.00%	885	50.34%	117	6.66%
1952	1,147	58.43%	809	41.21%	7	0.36%
1956	1,003	57.94%	723	41.77%	5	0.29%
1960	928	51.81%	858	47.91%	5	0.28%
1964	596	36.63%	1,029	63.25%	2	0.12%
1968	821	48.32%	718	42.26%	160	9.42%
1972	971	54.06%	757	42.15%	68	3.79%
1976	922	48.00%	965	50.23%	34	1.77%
1980	1,187	52.52%	943	41.73%	130	5.75%
1984	1,227	58.01%	870	41.13%	18	0.85%
1988	1,106	51.63%	1,018	47.53%	18	0.84%
1992	942	35.60%	978	36.96%	726	27.44%
1996	927	43.28%	869	40.57%	346	16.15%
2000	1,528	63.53%	816	33.93%	61	2.54%
2004	1,703	62.52%	993	36.45%	28	1.03%
2008	1,512	56.31%	1,134	42.23%	39	1.45%
2012	1,645	62.67%	953	36.30%	27	1.03%
2016	1,898	71.46%	665	25.04%	93	3.50%
2020	2,133	72.55%	781	26.56%	26	0.88%
2024	2,356	74.60%	783	24.79%	19	0.60%

== See also ==
- National Register of Historic Places listings in Florence County, Wisconsin
