= Tipler, Wisconsin =

- Town
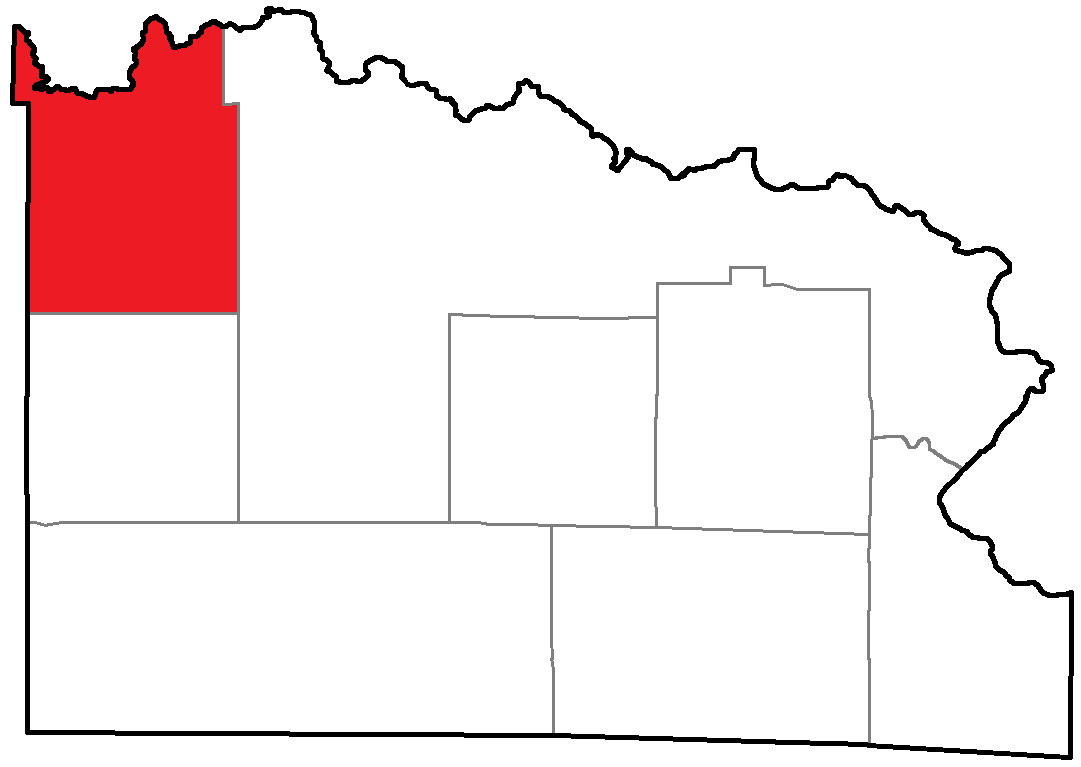
- Location of Tipler, within Florence County

- Location within Wisconsin
- Coordinates: 45°57′8″N 88°36′58″W
- Country: United States
- State: Wisconsin
- County: Florence

Area
  - Total: 43.1 sq mi (111.7 km^{2})
  - Land: 42.8 sq mi (110.9 km^{2})
  - Water: 0.27 sq mi (0.7 km^{2})
- Elevation: 1,594 ft (486 m)

Population (2020)
  - Total: 160
  - Density: 3.7/sq mi (1.4/km^{2})
- Time zone: UTC-6 (Central (CST))
  - Summer (DST): UTC-5 (CDT)
- Area codes: 715 & 534
- FIPS code: 55-79975
- GNIS feature ID: 1584281
- Website: https://townoftipler.org/

Tipler is a town in Florence County, Wisconsin, United States. The population was 160 at the 2020 census. The unincorporated community of Tipler is located in the town.

== Geography ==
According to the United States Census Bureau, the town has a total area of 43.1 square miles (111.7 km^{2}), of which 42.8 square miles (110.9 km^{2}) is land and 0.3 square mile (0.8 km^{2}) (0.67%) is water.

== Demographics ==
Historical population
Census	Pop.	Note	%±
1930	330		—
1940	402		21.8%
1950	281		−30.1%
1960	183		−34.9%
1970	162		−11.5%
1980	170		4.9%
1990	174		2.4%
2000	205		17.8%
2010	142		−30.7%
2020	160		12.7%
U.S. Decennial Census

As of the census of 2000, there were 205 people, 88 households, and 55 families residing in the town. The population density was 4.8 inhabitants per square mile (1.9/km^{2}). There were 300 housing units at an average density of 7.0 per square mile (2.7/km^{2}). The racial makeup of the town was 95.61% White, 1.95% Native American, 2.44% from other races. Hispanic or Latino of any race were 2.44% of the population.

There were 88 households, out of which 21.6% had children under the age of 18 living with them, 55.7% were married couples living together, 3.4% had a female householder with no husband present, and 37.5% were non-families. 35.2% of all households were made up of individuals, and 14.8% had someone living alone who was 65 years of age or older. The average household size was 2.27 and the average family size was 2.85.

In the town, the population was spread out, with 20.0% under the age of 18, 2.4% from 18 to 24, 22.0% from 25 to 44, 31.2% from 45 to 64, and 24.4% who were 65 years of age or older. The median age was 49 years. For every 100 females, there were 113.5 males. For every 100 females age 18 and over, there were 118.7 males.

The median income for a household in the town was $31,250, and the median income for a family was $36,250. Males had a median income of $25,625 versus $18,750 for females. The per capita income for the town was $14,406. About 12.2% of families and 16.0% of the population were below the poverty line, including 26.0% of those under the age of eighteen and 19.0% of those 65 or over.
