= Tipler (community), Wisconsin =

Tipler, Wisconsin
- Unincorporated community
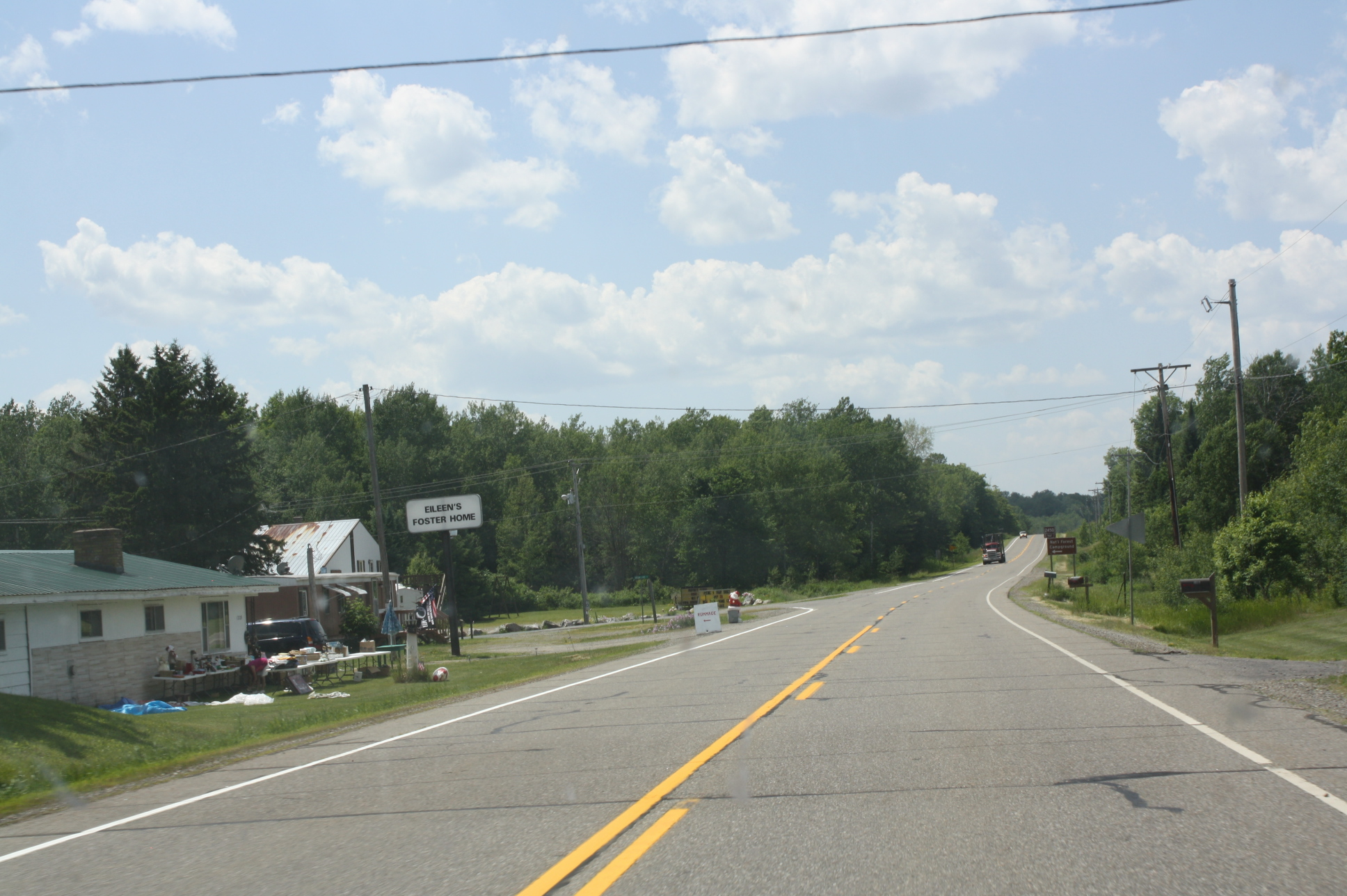
- Looking west in downtown Tipler on Wisconsin Highway 70

- Location within Wisconsin Location within the United States
- Coordinates: 45°55′30″N 88°38′05″W
- Country: United States
- State: Wisconsin
- County: Florence
- Elevation: 1,539 ft (469 m)
- Time zone: UTC-6 (Central (CST))
  - Summer (DST): UTC-5 (CDT)
- Area codes: 715 & 534
- GNIS feature ID: 1580618

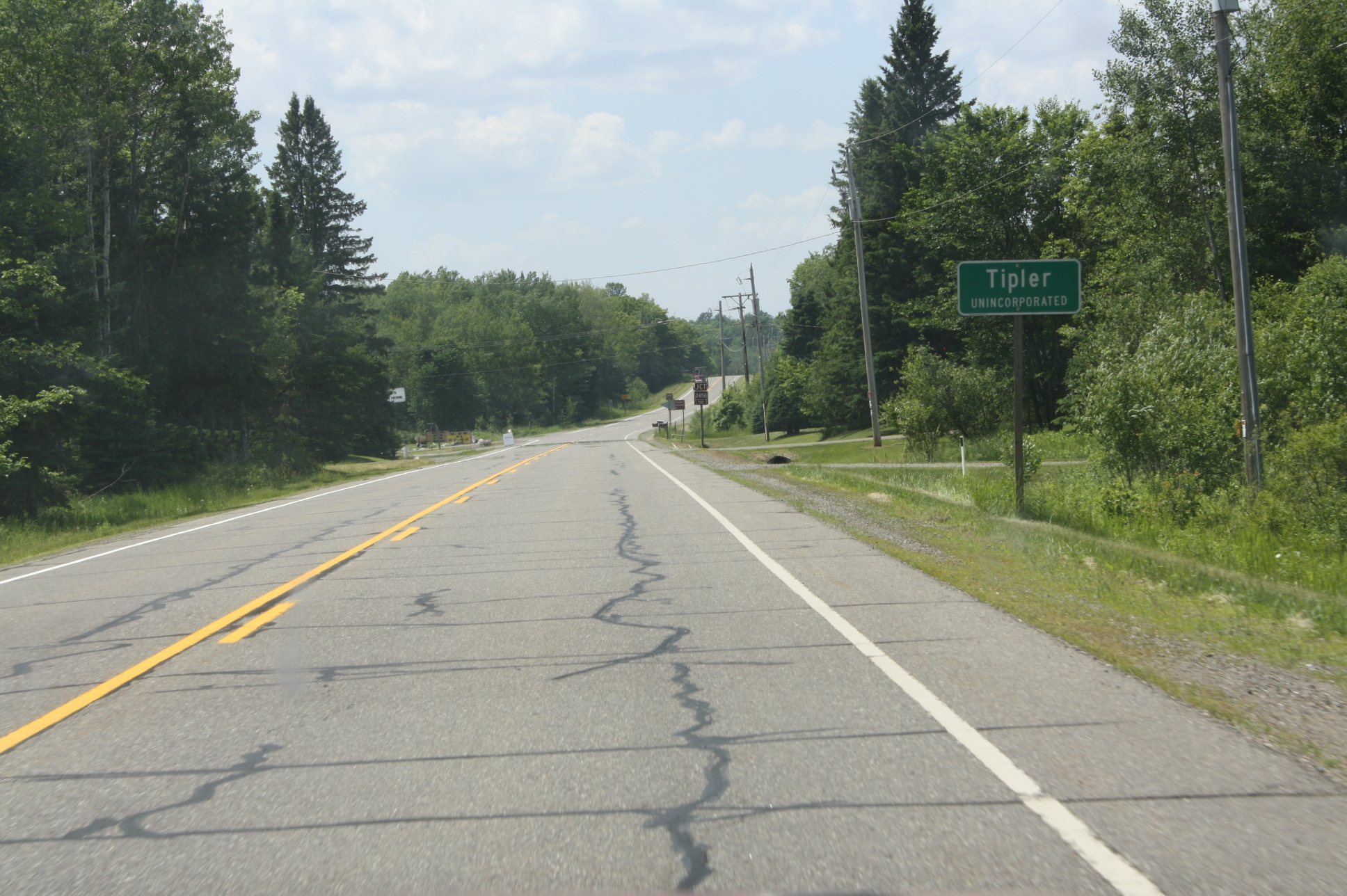
Sign for Tipler

Tipler is an unincorporated community in the town of Tipler, Florence County, Wisconsin, United States. Tipler is located along Wisconsin Highway 70, 18.5 miles (29.8 km) west of Florence. The community is located within Nicolet National Forest.
