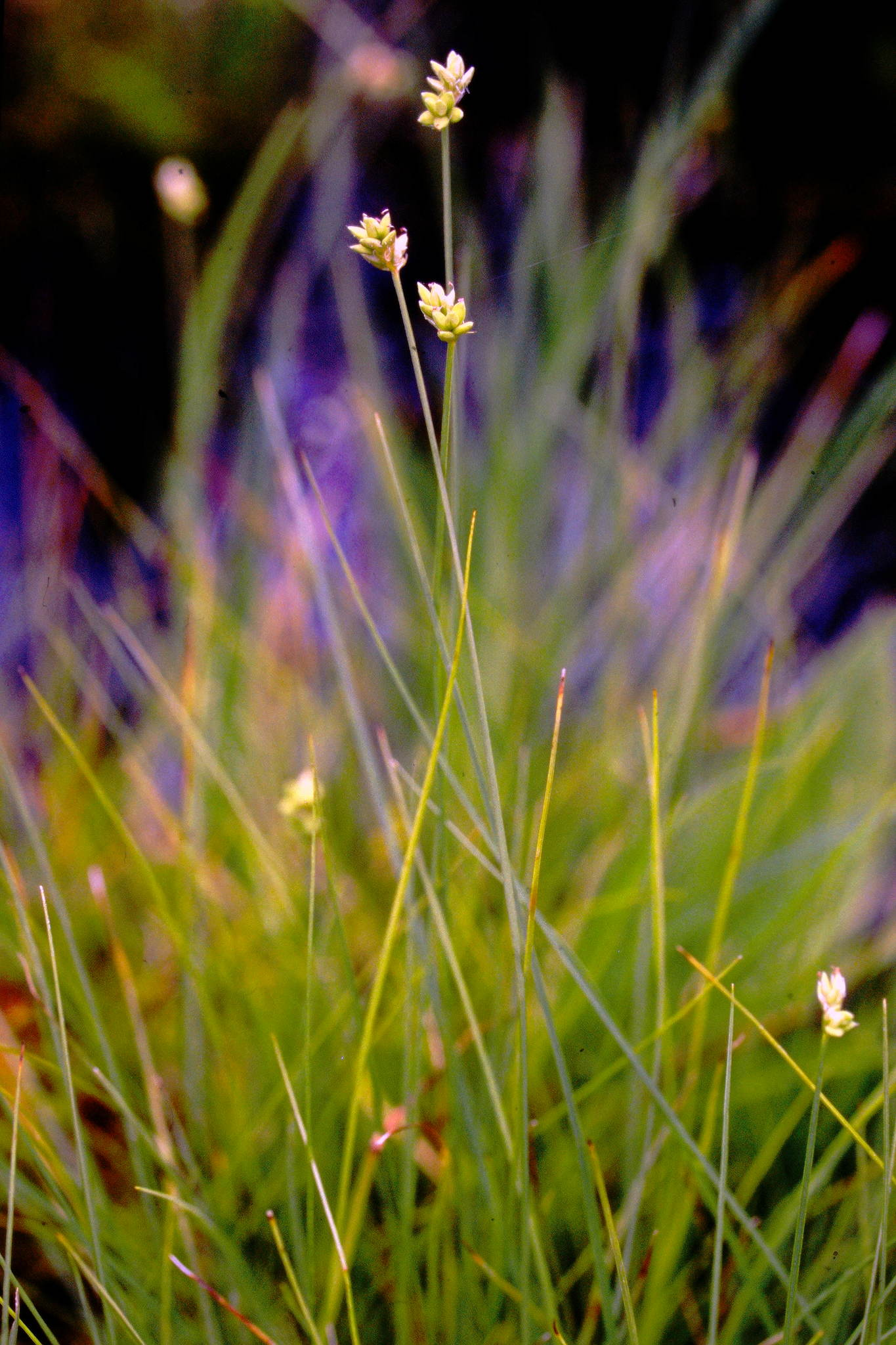
- Near Thunder Bay, Ontario, Canada

Conservation status
- Least Concern (IUCN 3.1)

Scientific classification
- Kingdom: Plantae
- Clade: Tracheophytes
- Clade: Angiosperms
- Clade: Monocots
- Clade: Commelinids
- Order: Poales
- Family: Cyperaceae
- Genus: Carex
- Species: C. tenuiflora

Binomial name
- Carex tenuiflora Wahlenb.

Synonyms
- List: Carex arrhyncha Franch.; Carex leucolepis Turcz. ex Steud.; Carex tenuiflora var.setacea Kük.; Vignea tenuiflora (Wahlenb.) Soják

= Carex tenuiflora =

Species of flowering plant in the sedge family

Carex tenuiflora, the sparse-flowered sedge, is a species of flowering plant in the family Cyperaceae.

== Description ==
Carex tenuiflora is a clump-forming perennial, grasslike plant, characterized by its combination of 2 to 4 spikes, closely clustered at the tip of the stem. Stems are three-sided and slender, reaching about 20 inches in length. Leaves are alternate, 5 to 2 mm wide, 2 to 6 inches long, and generally shorter than the flowering stems. Leaf sheaths are brownish in colour. Fruit develops from late spring to early summer, and takes the form of clusters of achenes at the end of the pistillate spike.

== Distribution and habitat ==
Carex tenuiflora is native to the Subarctic and Hemiboreal Northern Hemisphere; Alaska, Canada, the northern US, Scandinavia, the Baltic States, all of Russia, the north Caucasus, Siberia, the Russian Far East, Mongolia, northern China, Korea, and Japan. It is most often found in peatlands, preferring a pH of 6.
