= Long Lake (CDP), Wisconsin =

Census-designated place in Wisconsin, United States

Long Lake, Wisconsin
- Census-designated place
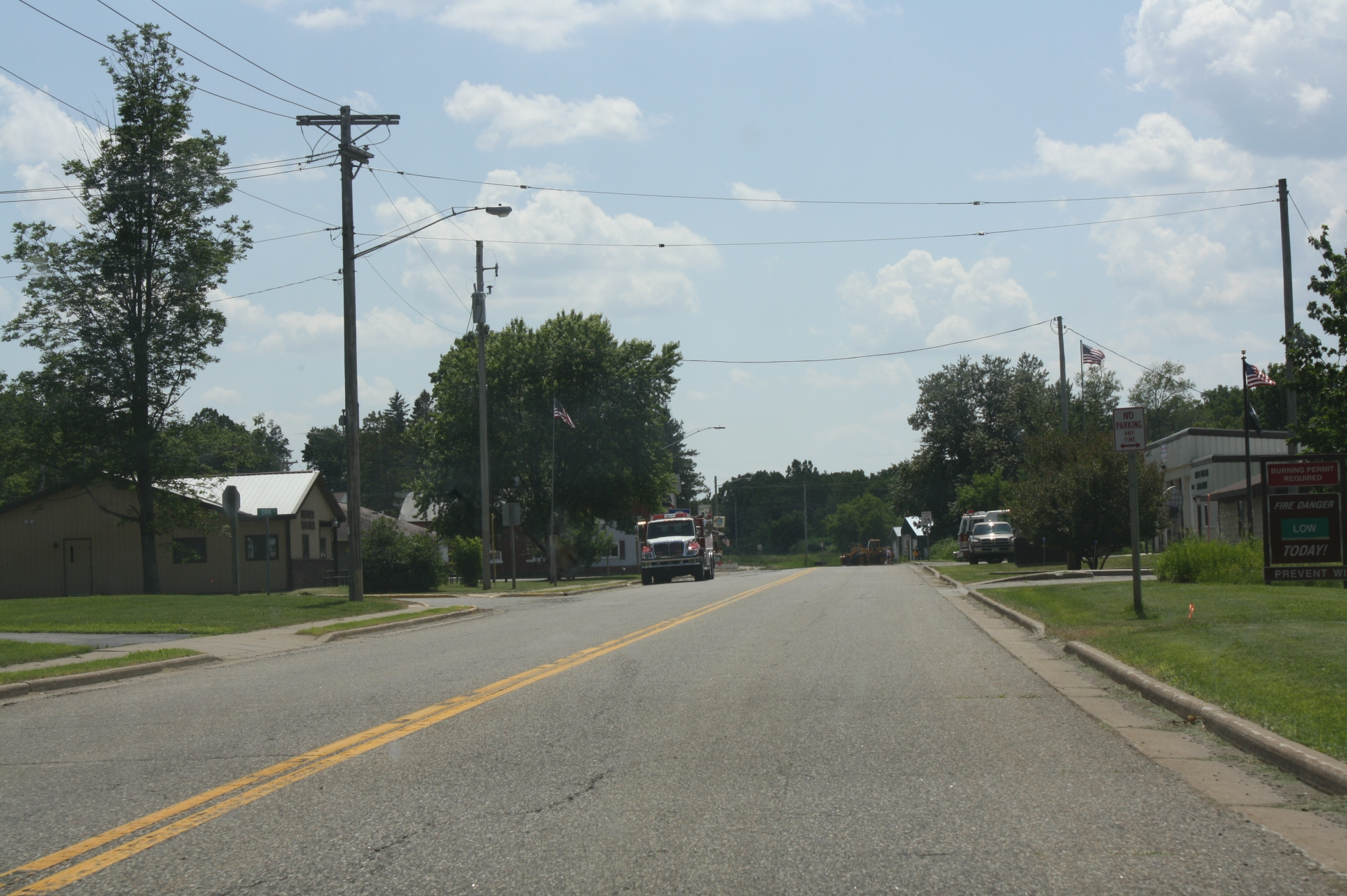
- Downtown Long Lake

- Location within Wisconsin
- Coordinates: 45°50′34″N 88°40′04″W
- Country: United States
- State: Wisconsin
- County: Florence

Area
  - Total: 0.264 sq mi (0.68 km^{2})
  - Land: 0.264 sq mi (0.68 km^{2})
  - Water: 0 sq mi (0 km^{2})
- Elevation: 1,558 ft (475 m)

Population (2020)
  - Total: 59
  - Density: 220/sq mi (86/km^{2})
- Time zone: UTC-6 (Central (CST))
  - Summer (DST): UTC-5 (CDT)
- ZIP code: 54542
- Area codes: 715 & 534
- GNIS feature ID: 1579744

Long Lake is an unincorporated census-designated place in the town of Long Lake, Florence County, Wisconsin, United States. Long Lake is located on the eastern shore of Long Lake along Wisconsin Highway 139, 21 miles (34 km) west-southwest of Florence. As of the 2020 census, its population was 59. The community became a census-designated place in 2010. The community has the 54542 ZIP code.

== Demographics ==
Whites make up the largest racial/ethnic group in Long Lake (100.0%).

Historical population
Census	Pop.	Note	%±
2010	50		—
2020	59		18.0%
sources 2010-2020

== Images ==
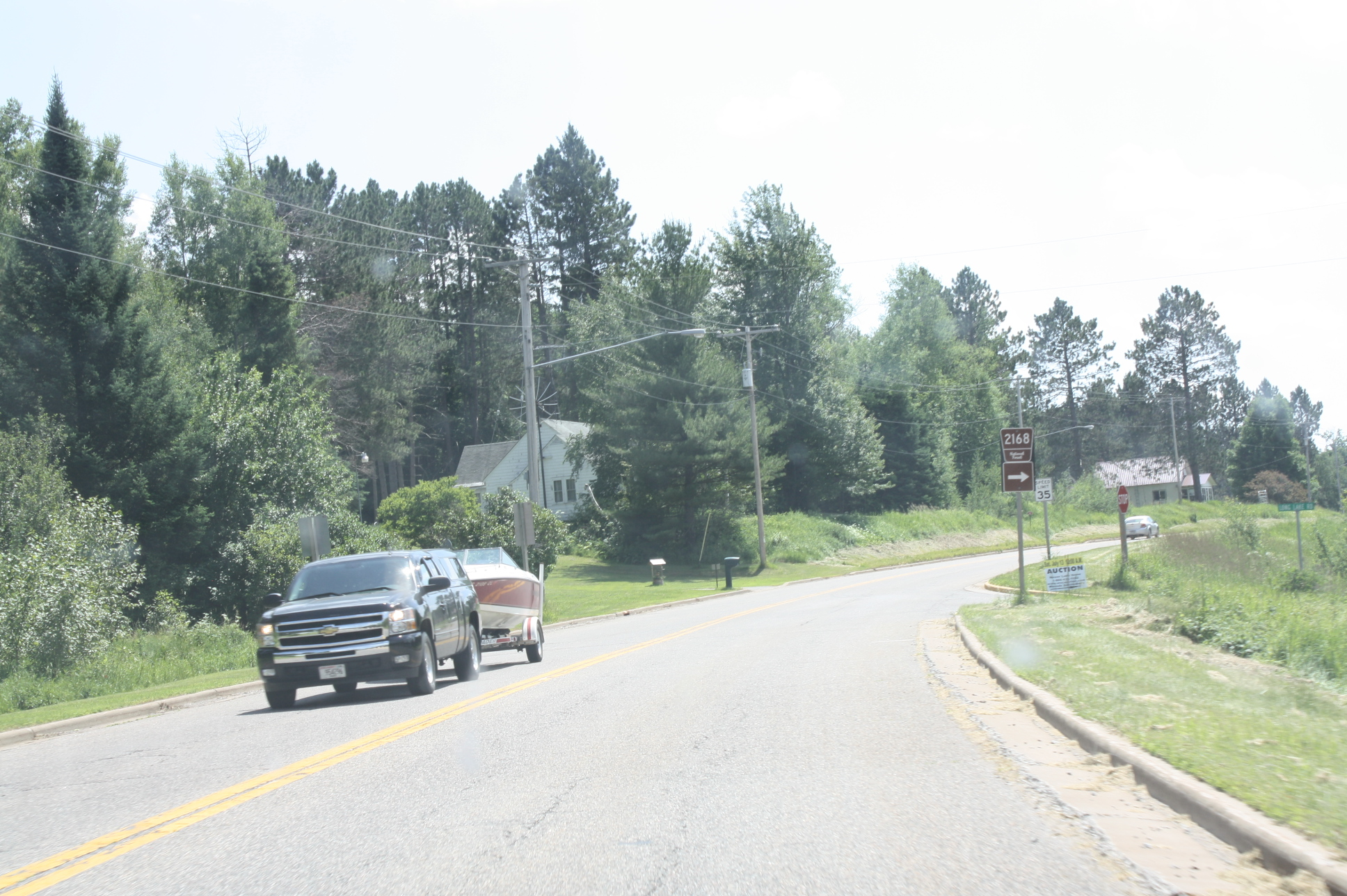
National Forest Road 2168

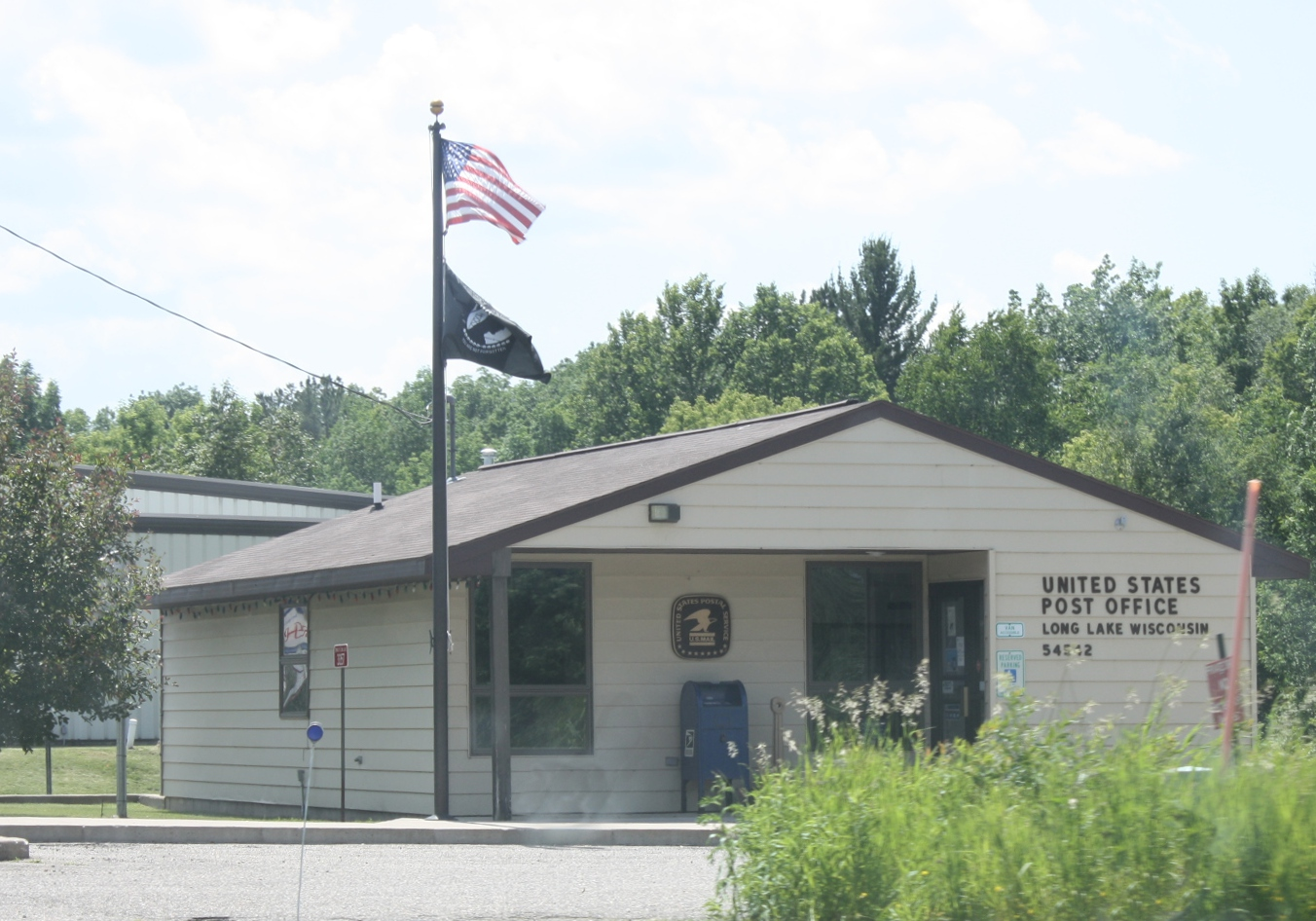
Post office

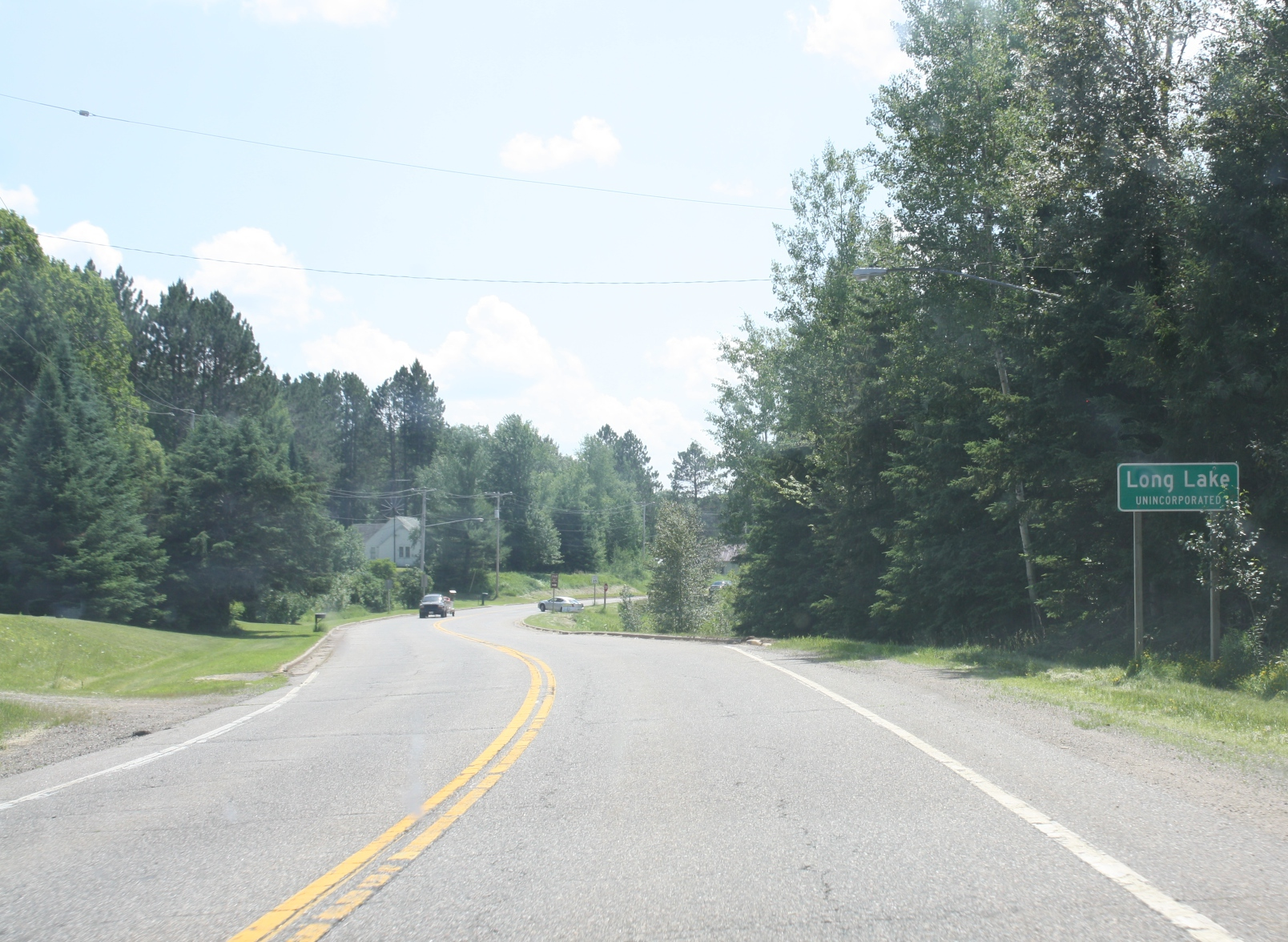
Sign

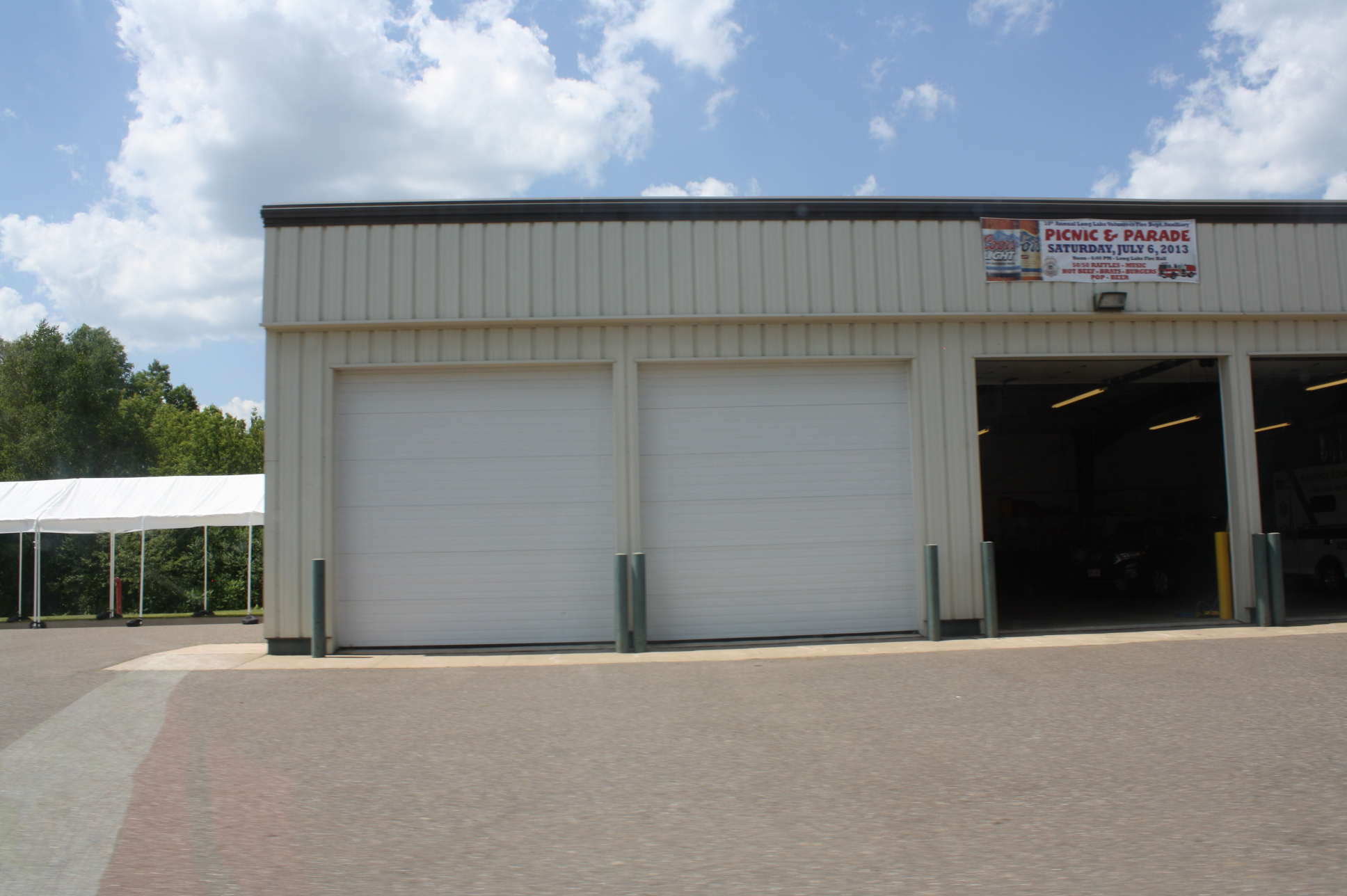
Fire Department
