= Hematite, Wisconsin =

- Unincorporated community
- Location within Wisconsin Location within the United States
- Coordinates: 45°54′33″N 88°12′34″W
- Country: United States
- State: Wisconsin
- County: Florence
- Elevation: 1,335 ft (407 m)
- Time zone: UTC-6 (Central (CST))
  - Summer (DST): UTC-5 (CDT)
- Area codes: 715 & 534
- GNIS feature ID: 1577636

Hematite is an unincorporated community located in the town of Florence, Florence County, Wisconsin, United States.

== History ==
The community was named for deposits of hematite iron ore in the area.
