= Long Lake, Florence County, Wisconsin =

Long Lake, Wisconsin
- Town
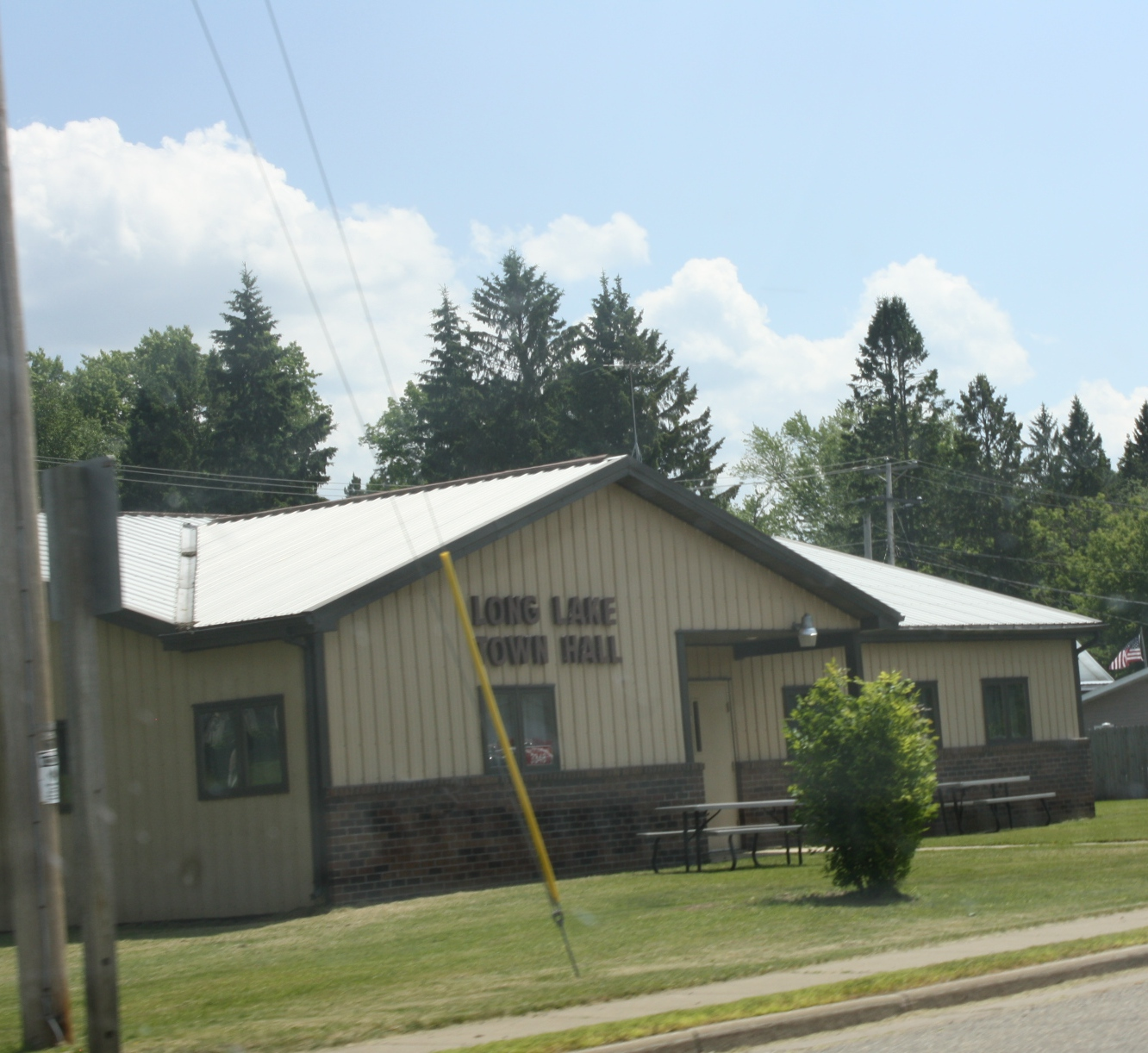
- Town hall

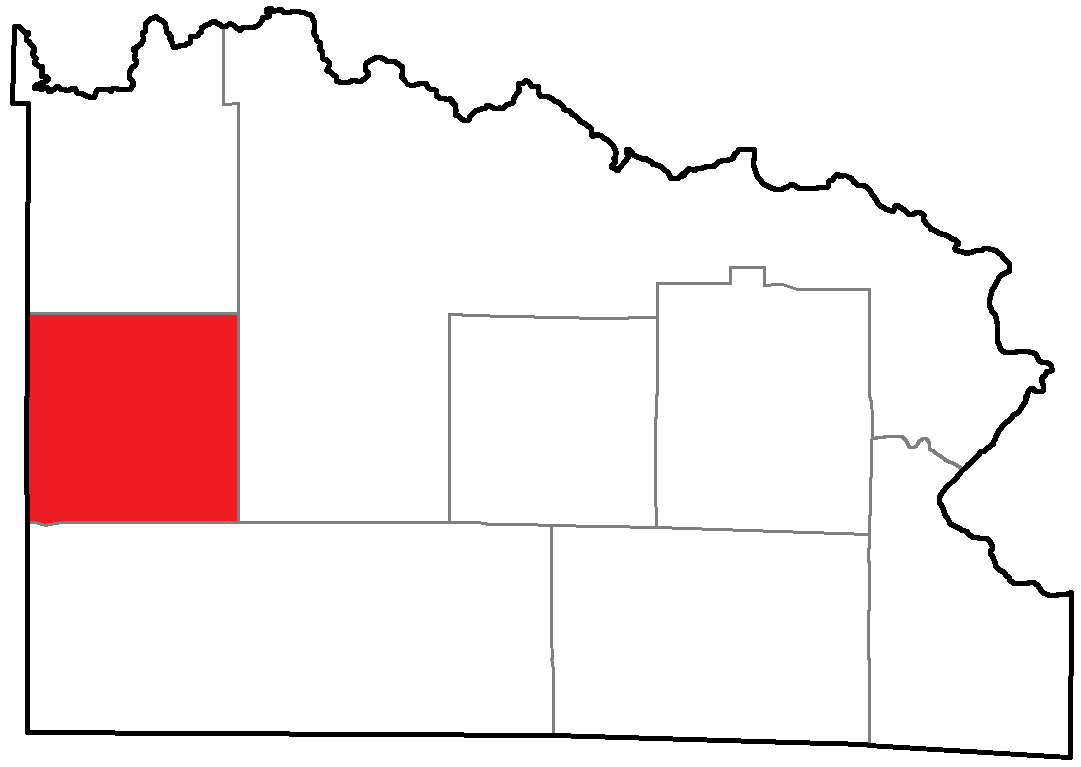
- Location of Long Lake, within Florence County

- Location within Wisconsin
- Coordinates: 45°51′15″N 88°37′22″W
- Country: United States
- State: Wisconsin
- County: Florence

Area
  - Total: 35.8 sq mi (92.8 km^{2})
  - Land: 34.0 sq mi (88.0 km^{2})
  - Water: 1.9 sq mi (4.8 km^{2})
- Elevation: 1,503 ft (458 m)

Population (2020)
  - Total: 178
  - Density: 5.24/sq mi (2.02/km^{2})
- Time zone: UTC-6 (Central (CST))
  - Summer (DST): UTC-5 (CDT)
- Area codes: 715 & 534
- FIPS code: 55-45625
- GNIS feature ID: 1583596
- Website: https://townoflonglake-wi.com/

Long Lake is a town in Florence County, Wisconsin, United States. The population was 178 at the 2020 census. The census-designated place of Long Lake is located in the town.

== Geography ==
According to the United States Census Bureau, the town has a total area of 35.8 square miles (92.8 km^{2}), of which 34.0 square miles (88.0 km^{2}) is land and 1.9 square miles (4.8 km^{2}) (5.16%) is water.

== Demographics ==
Historical population
Census	Pop.	Note	%±
1920	184		—
1930	319		73.4%
1940	303		−5.0%
1950	211		−30.4%
1960	211		0.0%
1970	190		−10.0%
1980	199		4.7%
1990	205		3.0%
2000	197		−3.9%
2010	157		−20.3%
2020	178		13.4%
U.S. Decennial Census

As of the census of 2000, there were 197 people, 91 households, and 62 families residing in the town. The population density was 5.8 inhabitants per square mile (2.2/km^{2}). There were 296 housing units at an average density of 8.7 per square mile (3.4/km^{2}). The racial makeup of the town was 96.45% White, 0.51% Native American, 0.51% Asian, and 2.54% from two or more races.

There were 91 households, out of which 16.5% had children under the age of 18 living with them, 65.9% were married couples living together, 1.1% had a female householder with no husband present, and 30.8% were non-families. 27.5% of all households were made up of individuals, and 14.3% had someone living alone who was 65 years of age or older. The average household size was 2.16 and the average family size was 2.59.

The population age distribution was: 15.2% under the age of 18, 6.6% from 18 to 24, 19.3% from 25 to 44, 35.0% from 45 to 64, and 23.9% who were 65 years of age or older. The median age was 51 years. For every 100 females, there were 121.3 males. For every 100 females age 18 and over, there were 111.4 males.

The median income for a household in the town was $27,500, and the median income for a family was $28,958. Males had a median income of $22,083 versus $17,250 for females. The per capita income for the town was $15,818. About 10.9% of families and 18.5% of the population were below the poverty line, including 34.5% of those under the age of eighteen and none of those 65 or over.

Long Lake has one Catholic church, Saint Norbert Parish, located at 3402 State Highway 139. Saint Norbert Parish is a mission church served from Saint Leonard Parish in Laona, WI. Saint Norbert Parish first served as a mission church from Laona in 1927, became a mission church of the Florence, WI parish for a time starting in 1954, then returned to the Laona parish. It has two non-denominational churches, one in town, and one on the main highway, heading North.
