= Rubys Corner, Wisconsin =

- Unincorporated community
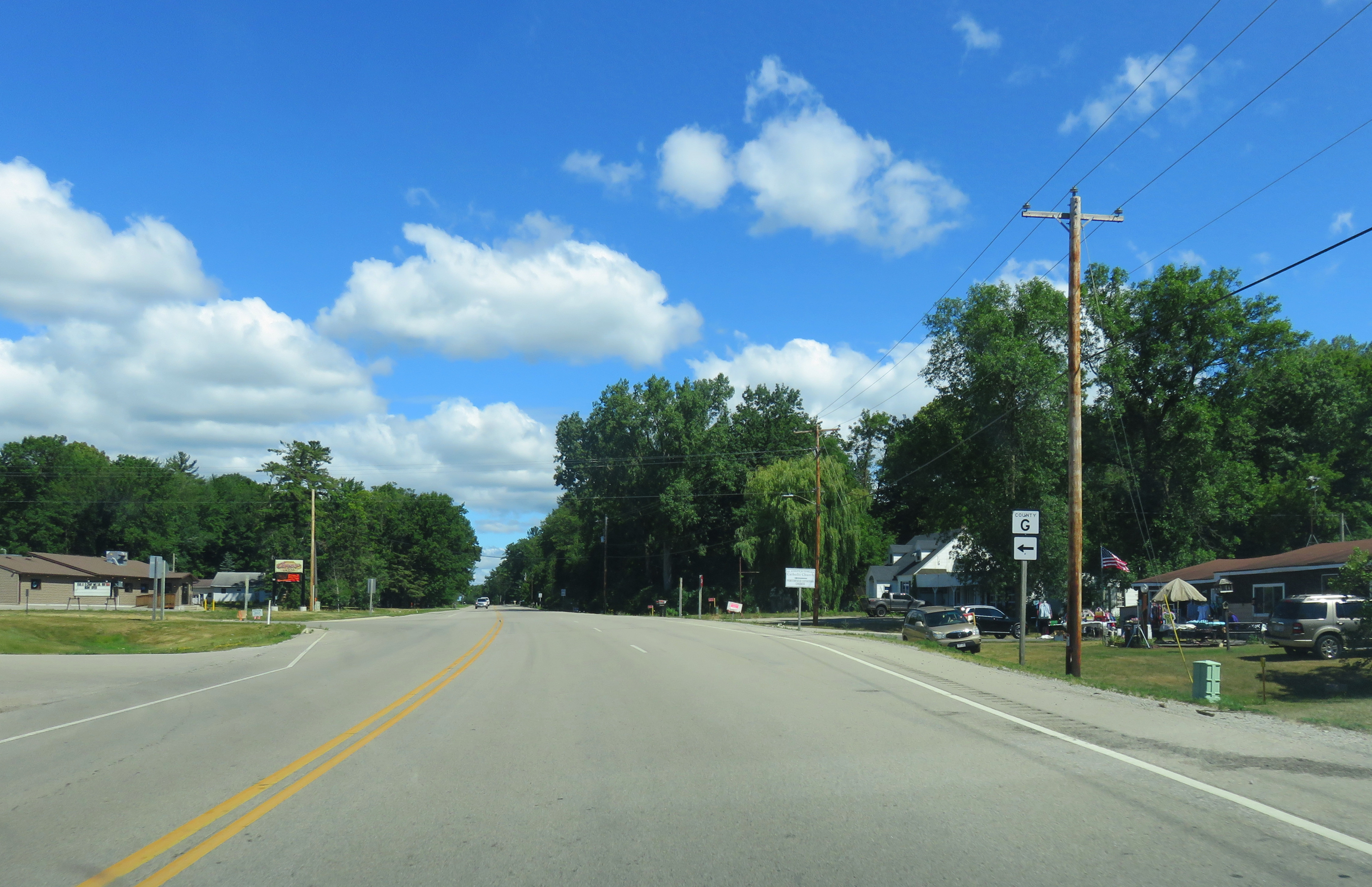

- Location within Wisconsin Location within the United States
- Coordinates: 45°10′44″N 87°44′23″W
- Country: United States
- State: Wisconsin
- County: Marinette
- Elevation: 634 ft (193 m)
- Time zone: UTC-6 (Central (CST))
  - Summer (DST): UTC-5 (CDT)
- Area codes: 715 & 534
- GNIS feature ID: 1572708

Rubys Corner is an unincorporated community located in the town of Porterfield, Marinette County, Wisconsin, United States.

== Geography ==
Rubys Corner is located along Wisconsin Highway 180 at the intersection of County Trunk Highway G, at an elevation of 634 feet (193 m). It stands on the right bank of the Menominee River, about 800 feet (240 m) west of the Wisconsin–Michigan state line. It is connected by road to Walsh and Loomis to the west, Marinette to the southeast, and McAllister and Wausaukee to the north. Rubys Corner has a restaurant and a gas station with a convenience store.

== Etymology ==
Rubys Corner is named after William Ruby (1868–1927) and his wife Olive Ruby, née Cole (1873–1964). The Rubys operated a fox farm at the corner.
