= Wisconsin Highway 180 =

State highway in Wisconsin, United States

State Trunk Highway 180
- WIS 180 highlighted in red

Route information
- Maintained by WisDOT
- Length: 30.42 mi (48.96 km)
- Existed: 1948–present

Major junctions
- South end: WIS 64 / CTH-T in Marinette
- CTH-G in Rubys Corner; CTH-X west of Goll; CTH-JJ in McAllister; CTH-RR in McAllister
- North end: US 141 in Wausaukee

Location
- Country: United States
- State: Wisconsin
- Counties: Marinette

Highway system
- Wisconsin State Trunk Highway System; Interstate; US; State; Scenic; Rustic
← WIS 179	→ WIS 181

State Trunk Highway 180 (often called Highway 180, STH-180 or WIS 180) is a 30.42-mile (48.96 km), north–south state highway in southeastern Marinette County, Wisconsin, United States, that runs from WIS 64 in Marinette to US Highway 141 (US 141) in Wausaukee.

== Route description ==
WIS 180 begins at a roundabout on WIS 64 (Hall Avenue) on the northwestern city limits of Marinette. The road continues south as County Trunk Highway T (CTH-T, Roosevelt Road) to connect with US 41 and then on to end at CTH-B. WIS 64 heads east to end at US 41 in central Marinette and heads west to connect with US 141 and then on to Pound and Antigo. For its entire length, the WIS 180 roughly follows the western bank of the Menominee River as a two-lane road. The river in the area of WIS 180 flows along the stateline between Wisconsin and Michigan.

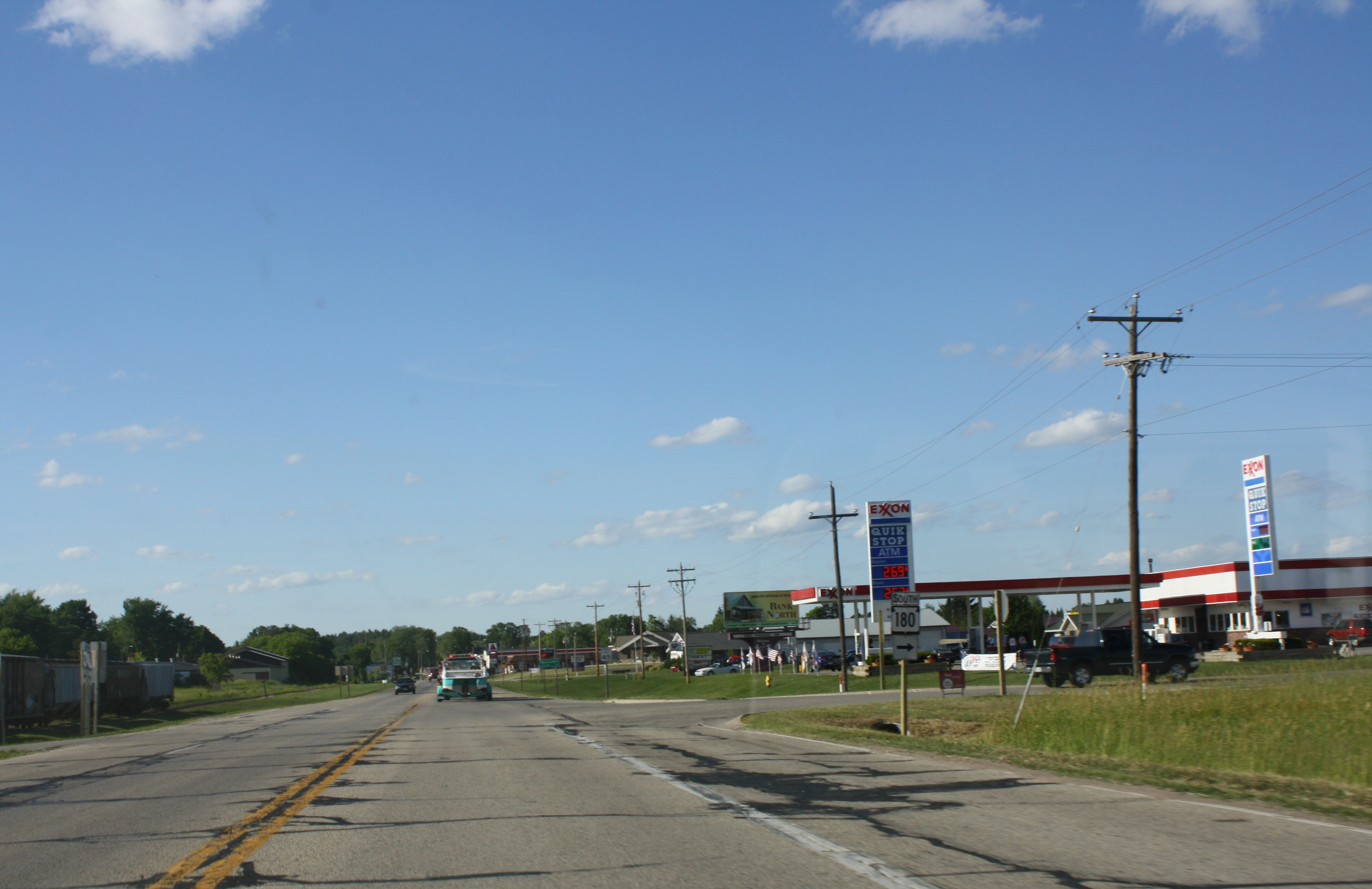
Looking north along US 141 at the northern terminus of WIS 180 on the southern city limits of Wausaukee, June 2009

From is southern terminus WIS 180 heads north along the western city limits line of Marinette as Roosevelt Avenue for about 0.5 miles (800 m) before turning northeasterly to leave the city. After promptly crossing a bridge over the Wright Slough of the Menominee River, WIS 180 continues its northeasterly course for about 6.5 miles (10.5 km) before reaching the eastern end of CTH-G in the unincorporated community of Rubys Corner. Continuing northerly for about another 3.6 miles (5.8 km), WIS 180 passes through the unincorporated community of Miles. About 3.9 miles (6.3 km) farther along its route, WIS 180 connects with the eastern end of CTH-X on the southeast corner of Menominee River County Park. Approximately 3.3 miles (5.3 km) later, WIS 180 enters the unincorporated community of McAllister.

Shortly after entering McAllister, WIS 180 curves to head west. Near the end of that curve the highway connects with the eastern end of CTH-JJ at a T intersection. WIS 180 then connects with the southern end of CTH-RR, almost immediately after its junction with CTH-JJ. From McAllister, WIS 180 heads westerly for about 12.3 miles (19.8 km) until it reaches its northern terminus at US 141 on the southern border of the village of Wausaukee. The road continues west as 1st Street over a double set of railroad tracks to end at 1st Road.

== History ==
In 1948 a section of CTH-C was designated as WIS 180. Since its establishment the highway has only had two significant changes. First, several of the sharper curves along the route have been softened. Second, the routing of the southern end within Marinette was moved from Riverside Avenue to the current Roosevelt Avenue.

== Major intersections ==
The entire route is in Marinette County.

Location	mi	km	Destinations	Notes
Marinette	0.00	0.00	CTH-T south (Roosevelt Road); WIS 64 (Hall Avenue) – Pound, Antigo	Roadway continues south as CTH-T
Rubys Corner			CTH-G west – Walsh, Loomis	
			CTH-X west – Goll, Middle Inlet	On the southwest corner of Menominee River County Park
McAllister			CTH-JJ east – Wallace	
McAllister			CTH-RR north – Koss	
Wausaukee	30.42	48.96	US 141 (Main Street) – Amberg, Pembine, Niagara, Crivitz, Pound, Green Bay; 1st Street	Northern terminus; roadway continues as 1st Street
1.000 mi = 1.609 km; 1.000 km = 0.621 mi
