= Wagner, Wisconsin =

- Town
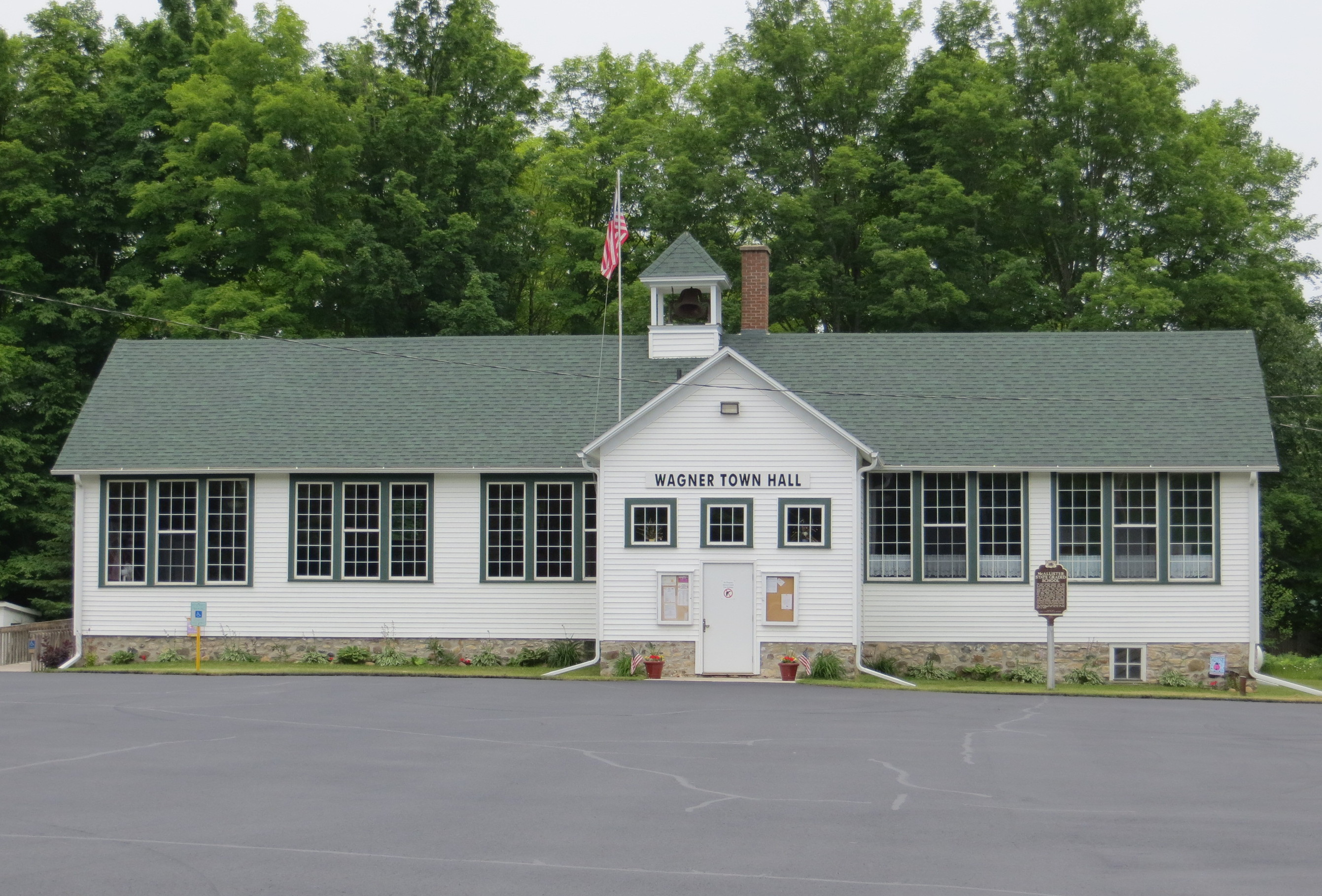
- Wagner town hall

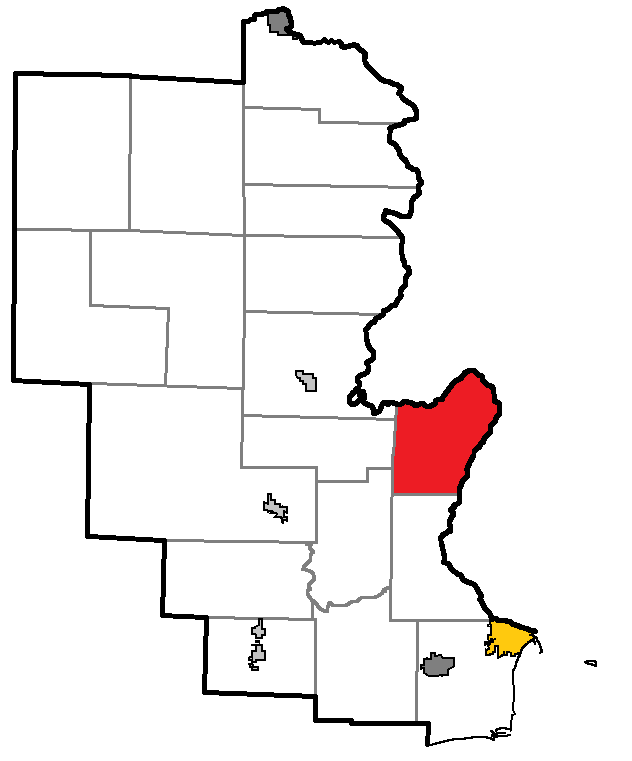
- Location of Wagner, within Marinette County
- Coordinates: 45°18′22″N 87°43′30″W
- Country: United States
- State: Wisconsin
- County: Marinette

Area
  - Total: 54.6 sq mi (141.4 km^{2})
  - Land: 53.2 sq mi (137.8 km^{2})
  - Water: 1.4 sq mi (3.6 km^{2})
- Elevation: 705 ft (215 m)

Population (2020)
  - Total: 653
  - Density: 12.3/sq mi (4.74/km^{2})
- Time zone: UTC-6 (Central (CST))
  - Summer (DST): UTC-5 (CDT)
- FIPS code: 55-83050
- GNIS feature ID: 1584338
- Website: https://www.townofwagnerwi.org/

Wagner is a town in Marinette County, Wisconsin, United States. The population was 653 at the 2020 census. The unincorporated communities of Goll, McAllister, Packard, and Wagner are located in the town.

== History ==
The Town of Wagner comprises numerous other settlements, including Bar, Goll, Kinsman, McAllister, Newton, Packard, and Wagner. Wagner was created in 1915, when residents east of Middle Inlet sought separation from Porterfield. The first county board supervisor was Joseph Wagner (1850–1925), whom the town is named after.

== Geography ==
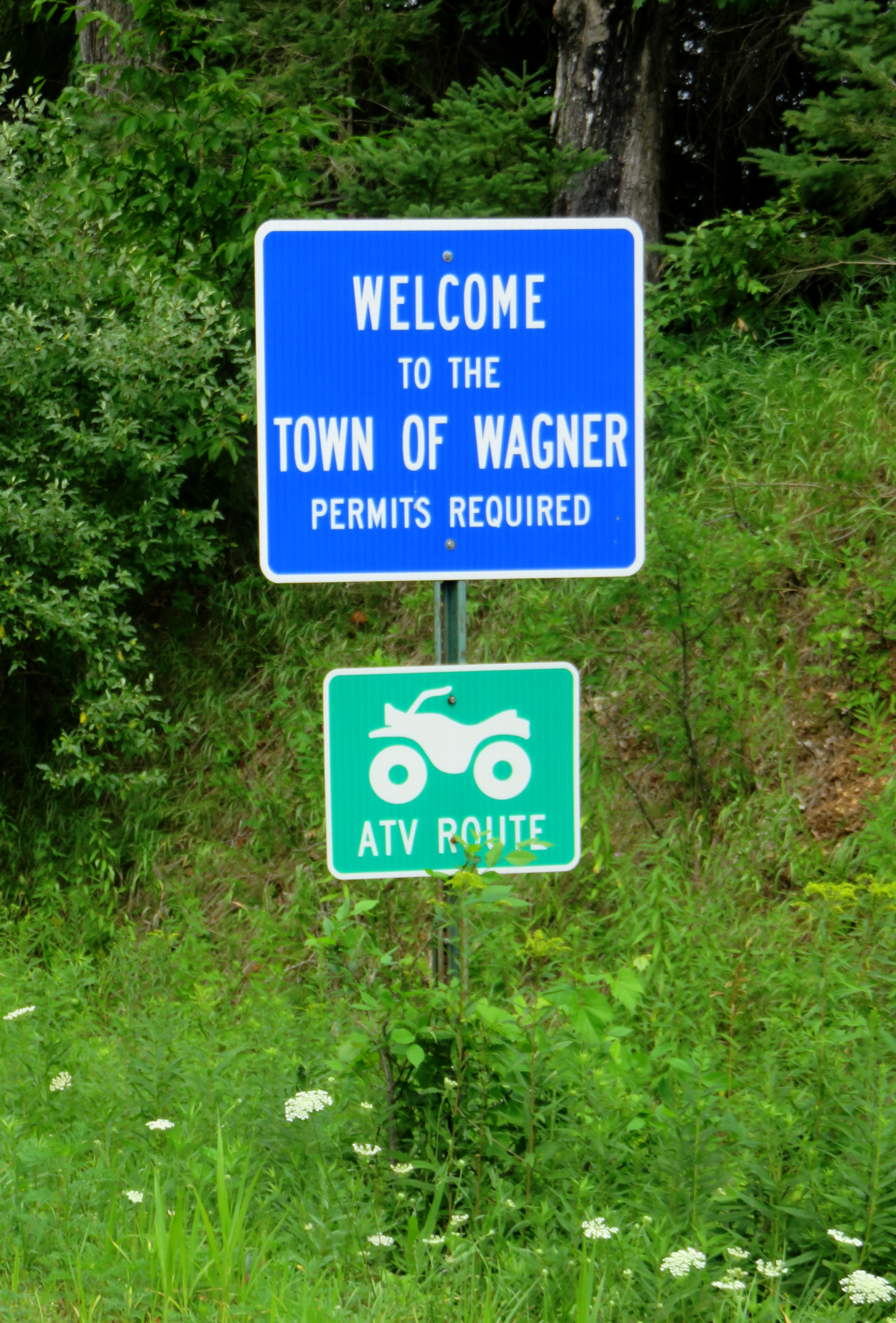
Town of Wagner welcome sign

According to the United States Census Bureau, the town has a total area of 54.6 square miles (141.4 km^{2}), of which 53.2 square miles (137.8 km^{2}) is land and 1.4 square miles (3.6 km^{2}) (2.55%) is water.

== Demographics ==
As of the census of 2000, there were 722 people, 283 households, and 213 families residing in the town. The population density was 13.6 inhabitants per square mile (5.3/km^{2}). There were 384 housing units at an average density of 7.2 per square mile (2.8/km^{2}). The racial makeup of the town was 98.06% White, 0.42% Native American, 0.14% Asian, 0.55% from other races, and 0.83% from two or more races. Hispanic or Latino of any race were 0.28% of the population.

There were 283 households, out of which 31.1% had children under the age of 18 living with them, 68.2% were married couples living together, 4.6% had a female householder with no husband present, and 24.4% were non-families. 21.2% of all households were made up of individuals, and 10.6% had someone living alone who was 65 years of age or older. The average household size was 2.55 and the average family size was 2.98.

In the town, the population was spread out, with 25.3% under the age of 18, 6.2% from 18 to 24, 25.8% from 25 to 44, 27.3% from 45 to 64, and 15.4% who were 65 years of age or older. The median age was 40 years. For every 100 females, there were 110.5 males. For every 100 females age 18 and over, there were 111.4 males.

The median income for a household in the town was $39,792, and the median income for a family was $45,185. Males had a median income of $31,313 versus $20,446 for females. The per capita income for the town was $15,165. About 4.1% of families and 4.8% of the population were below the poverty line, including 6.8% of those under age 18 and 8.5% of those age 65 or over.
