= Silver Cliff =

Silver Cliff may refer to:

== Places ==
United States

- Silver Cliff, Colorado
- Silver Cliff, Wisconsin

== Other ==
- The Silver Cliff, a 2011 Brazilian film
