= Miles, Wisconsin =

- Unincorporated community
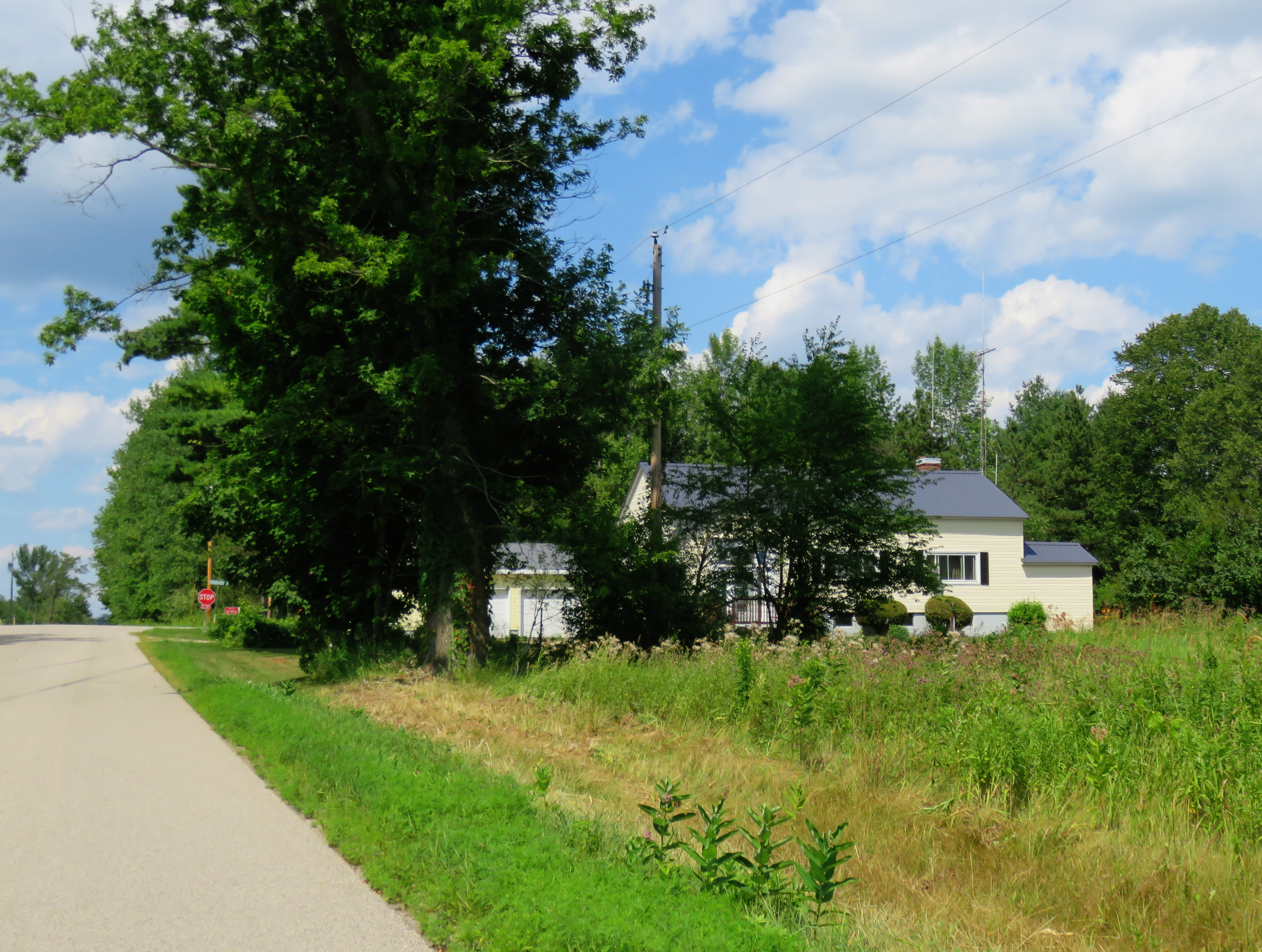

- Location within Wisconsin Location within the United States
- Coordinates: 45°13′45″N 87°46′45″W
- Country: United States
- State: Wisconsin
- County: Marinette
- Elevation: 669 ft (204 m)
- Time zone: UTC-6 (Central (CST))
  - Summer (DST): UTC-5 (CDT)
- Area codes: 715 & 534
- GNIS feature ID: 1876857

Miles is an unincorporated community located in the town of Porterfield, Marinette County, Wisconsin, United States.

== Geography ==
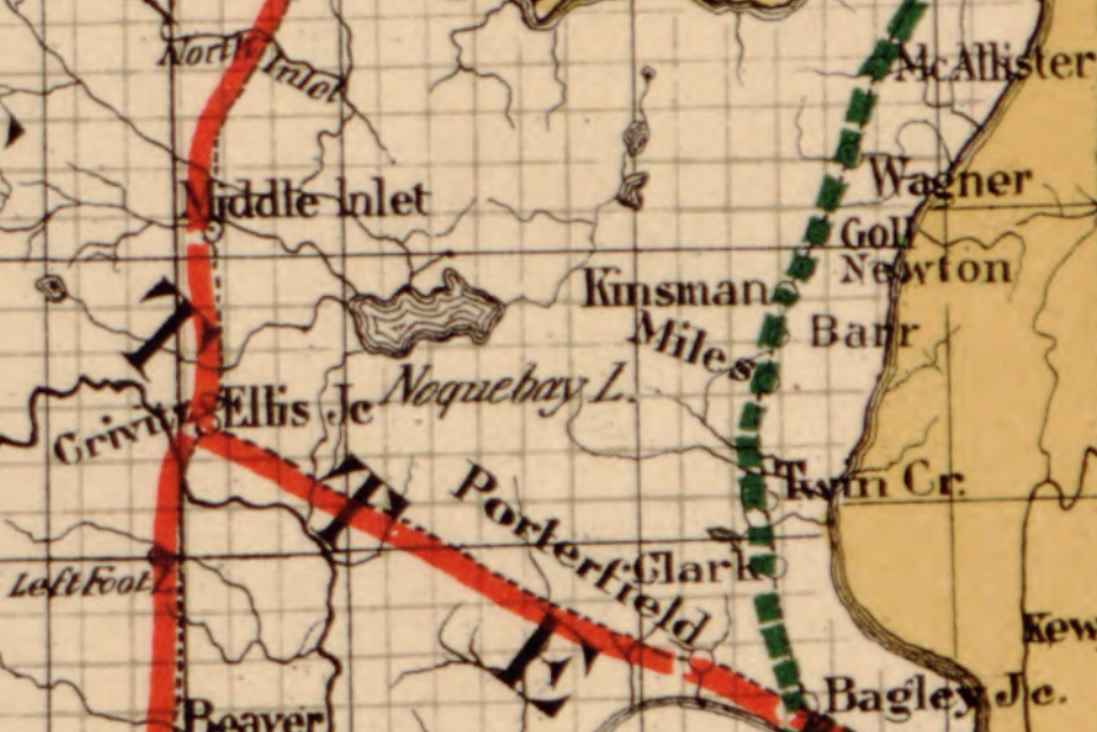
1900 railroad map

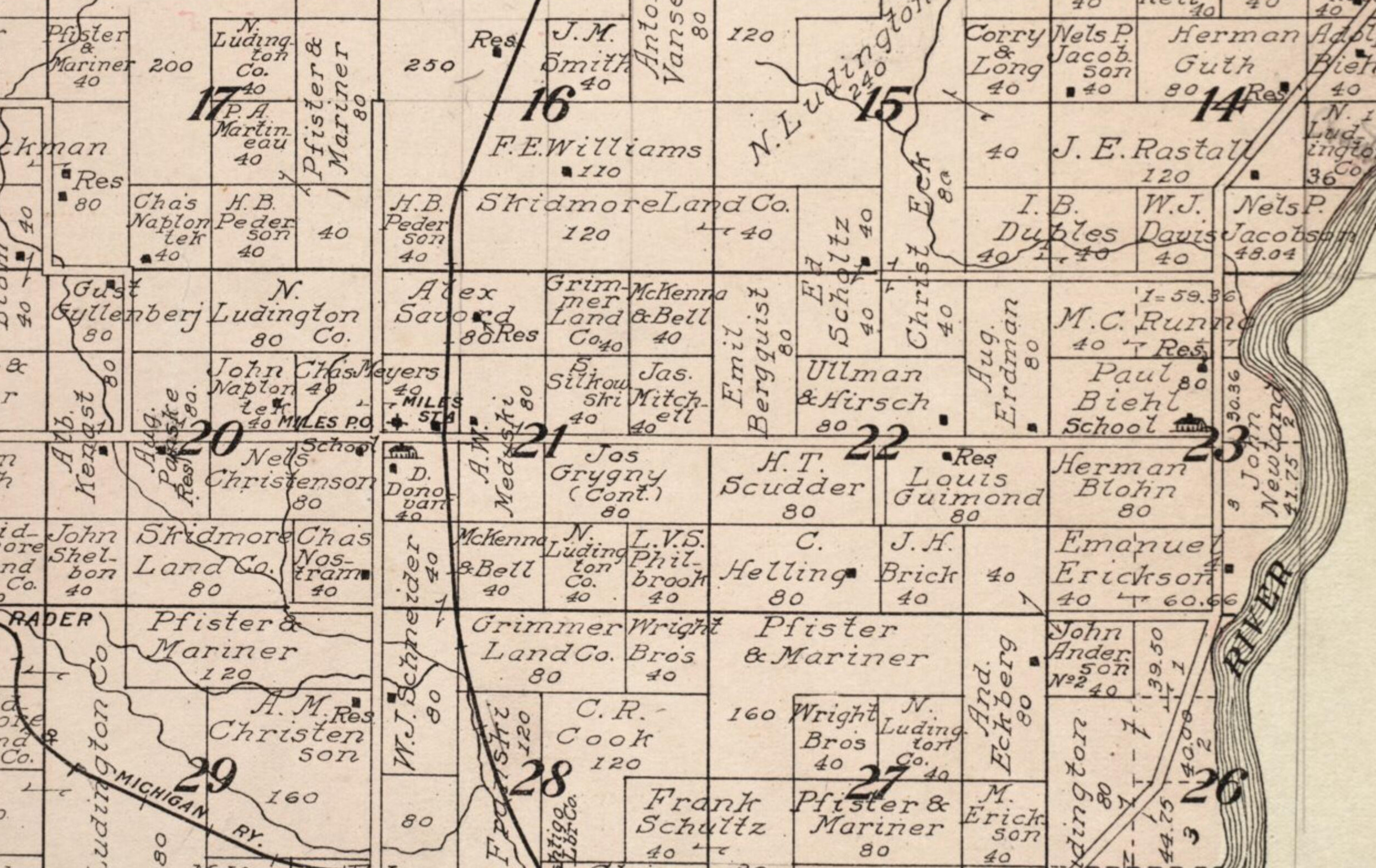
1912 plat book

Location of Miles

Miles is located at the intersection of Miles Road and Winesville Road, at an elevation of 689 feet (210 m). It is connected by road to Goll and Wagner (via Old Rail Road, formerly Right of Way Road) to the north, Walsh (via County Highway G) and Porterfield to the south, and Wisconsin Highway 180 to the east.

== History ==
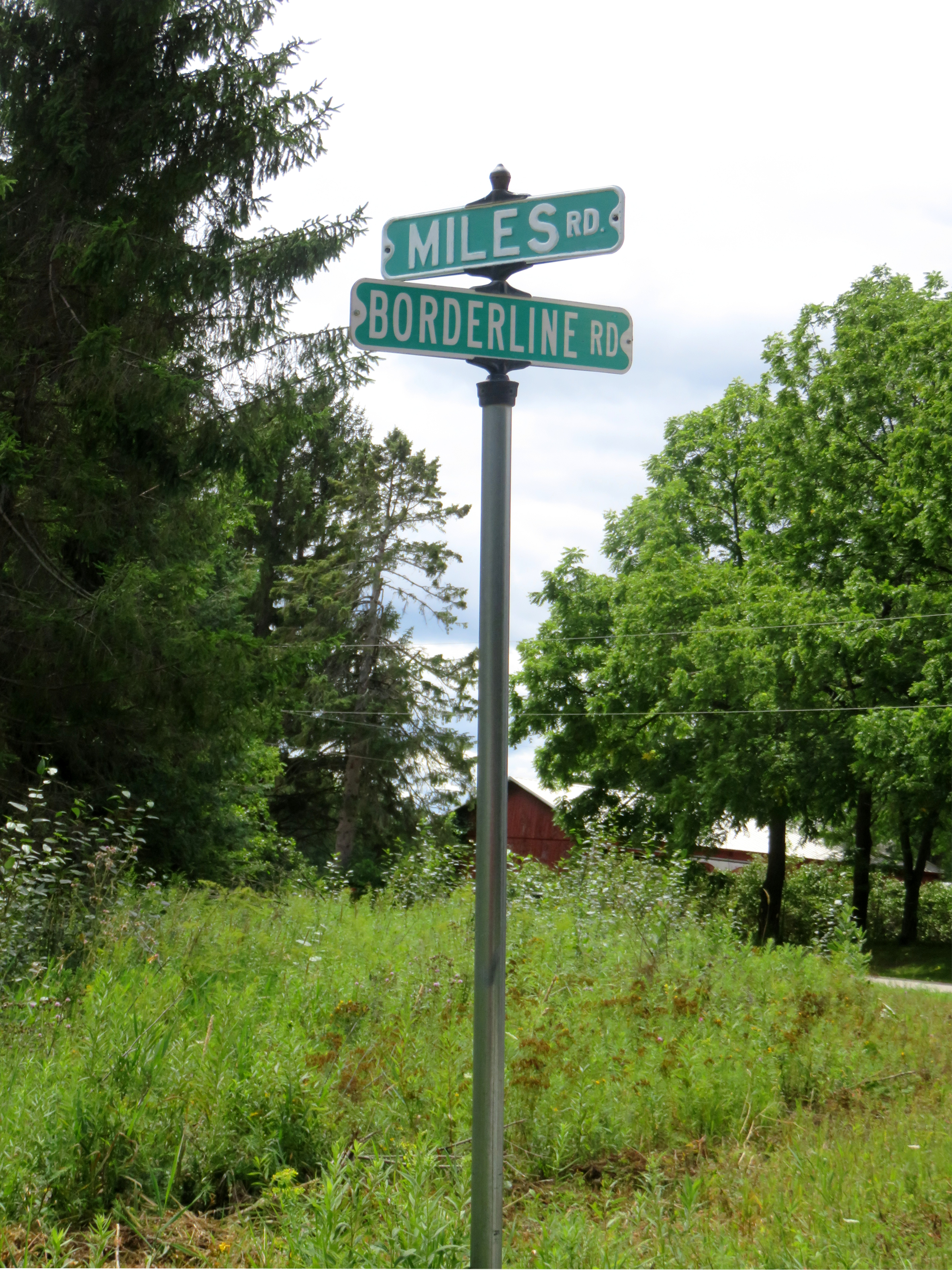
Sign for Miles Road north of Miles

Miles was a stop between Twin Creek and Goll on the Wisconsin & Michigan (W. & M.) Railway line from Bagley Junction to Iron Mountain. The rail line through Miles was discontinued in 1938, when the tracks were torn out and the rolling stock sold off. Miles Road runs through the community east of the old rail line. A post office was established in Miles in 1909, and it operated until 1912. There was also a school in Miles; it operated until 1963, when a new elementary school was built in Porterfield.
