= Wagner (community), Wisconsin =

Wagner, Wisconsin
- Unincorporated community
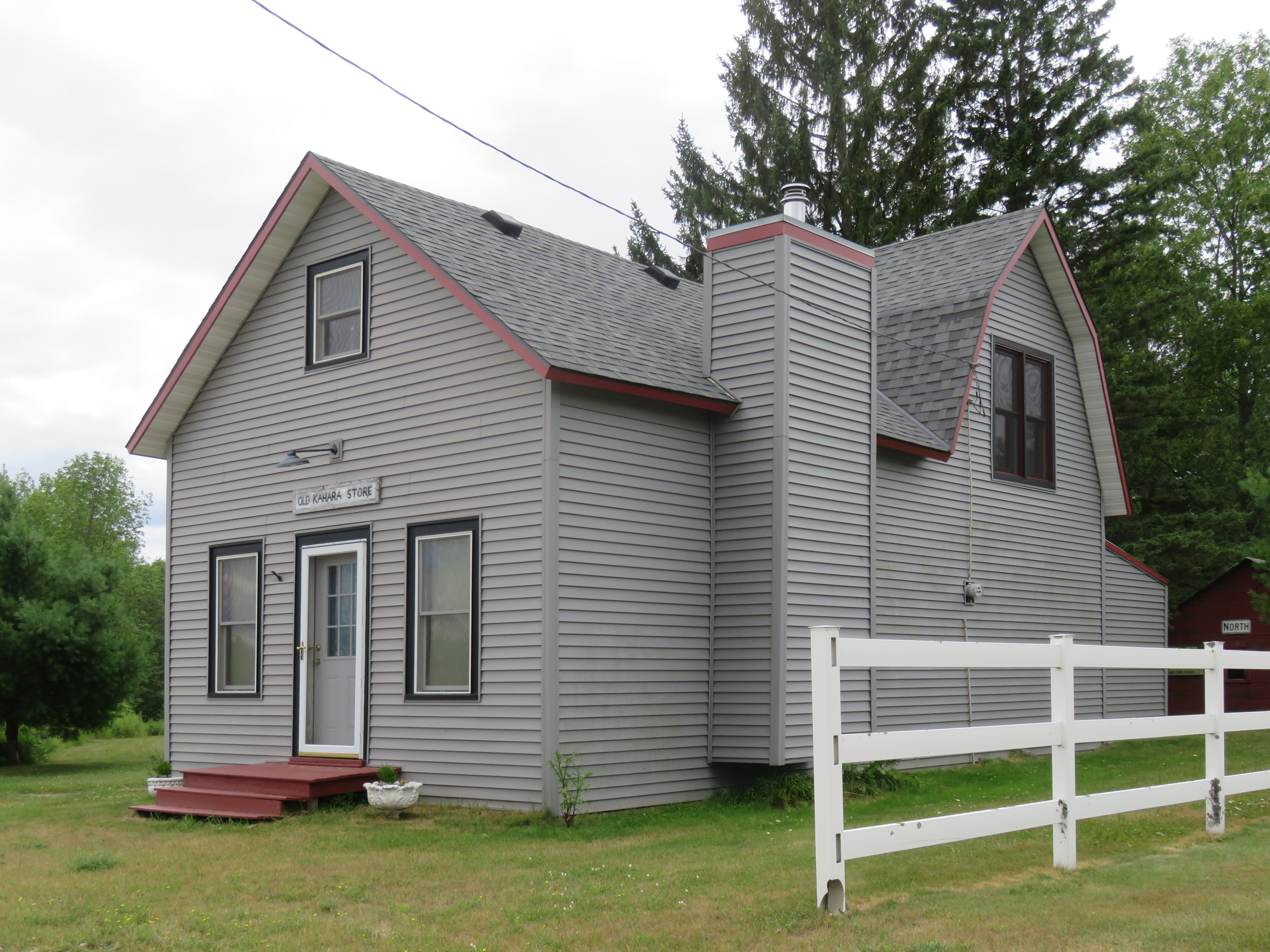
- Old Karara Store, the former general store in Wagner

- Location within Wisconsin Location within the United States
- Coordinates: 45°18′08″N 87°44′08″W
- Country: United States
- State: Wisconsin
- County: Marinette
- Elevation: 702 ft (214 m)
- Time zone: UTC-6 (Central (CST))
  - Summer (DST): UTC-5 (CDT)
- Area codes: 715 & 534
- GNIS feature ID: 1577871

Wagner is an unincorporated community located in the town of Wagner, Marinette County, Wisconsin, United States. Wagner is 11.5 miles (18.5 km) east-southeast of Wausaukee.

== Geography ==
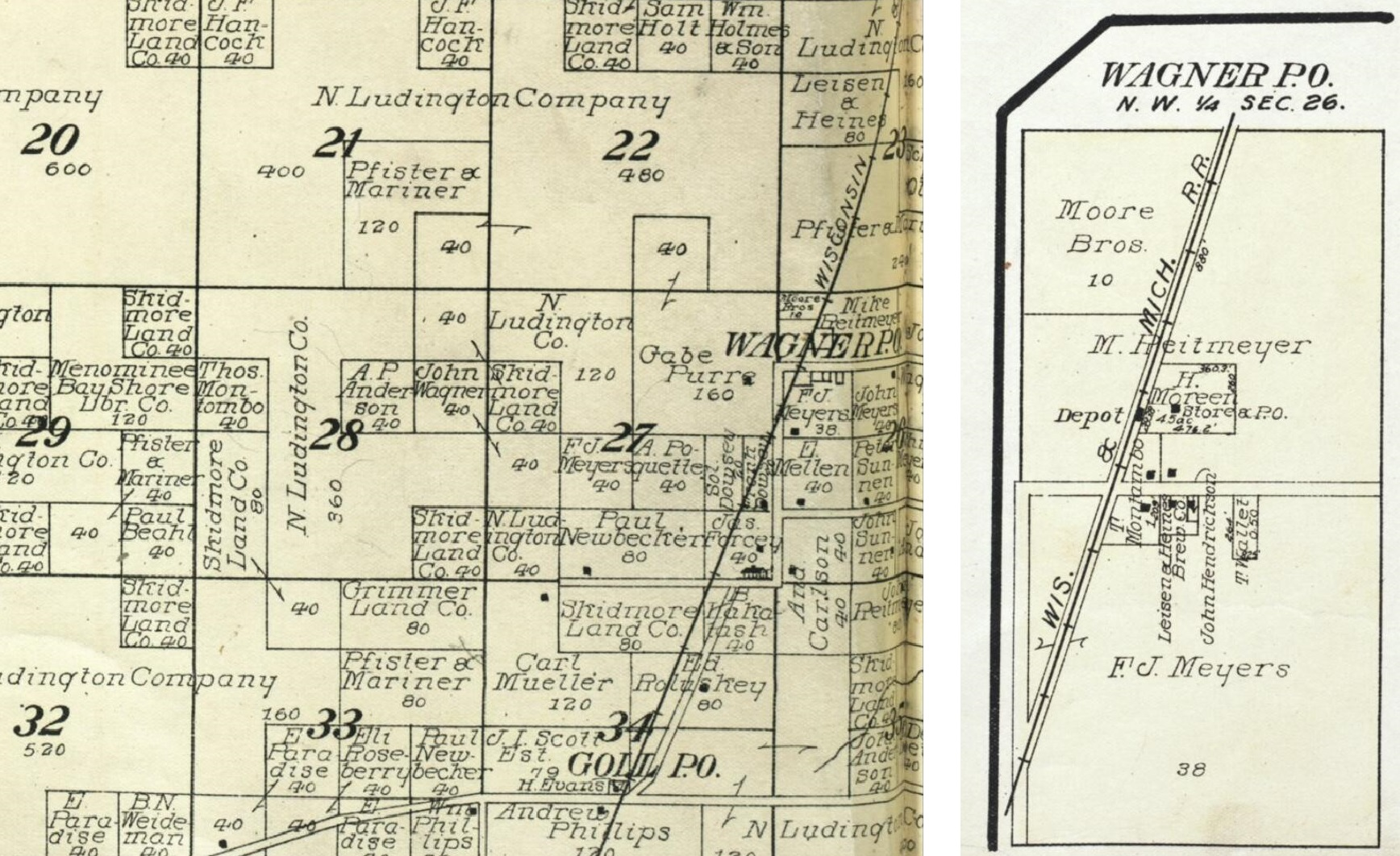
Wagner, 1912 map detail

Wagner is located at the intersection of Old Rail Road (formerly Right of Way Road) and Wagner Road, at an elevation of 702 feet (214 m). It is connected by road to McAllister to the north, Goll to the south, and Wisconsin Highway 180 to the east.

== Name ==
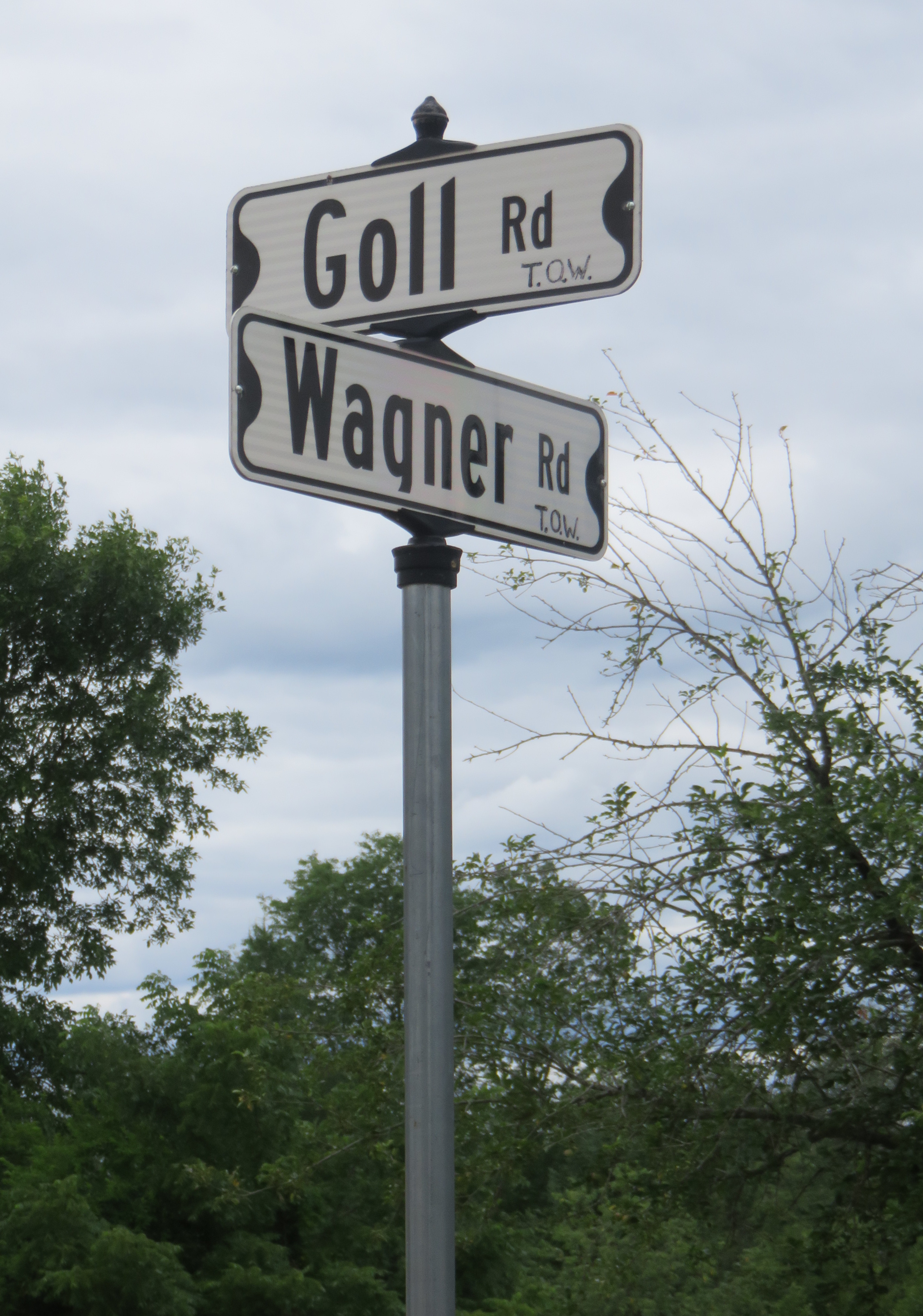
Sign for Wagner Road at the intersection with Goll Road in Wagner

Wagner is named after Joseph Wagner (1850–1925), an early settler of the area. Wagner was born in Austria and emigrated to the United States in 1865, initially to Chicago and then relocating to Mankato, Minnesota, where he met and married Susan Dauffenbach (1860–1941). They later moved to what is now Wagner, where Joseph Wagner was the first white settler. Wagner built a cabin there and worked for the sawmills in nearby Wallace, Michigan. Wagner Road, which passes through the community, is also named after Joseph Wagner.

== History ==
Wagner was gradually settled by Swedish, French-Canadian, German, Dutch, Polish, and Czech immigrants. Wagner formerly had a railroad depot, two small hotels, a cheese factory, sawmills and a shingle mill, a dance hall, taverns, and a general store. The Goll schoolhouse stood south of the settlement. In 1908 a fire destroyed all of the structures west of the railroad, including the mills, after which the settlement stagnated. Wagner was a stop between Goll and McAllister on the Wisconsin & Michigan (W. & M.) Railway line from Bagley Junction to Iron Mountain. The rail line through Wagner was discontinued in 1938, when the tracks were torn out and the rolling stock sold off. A post office was established in Wagner in 1897, and it operated until 1934.

== Church ==
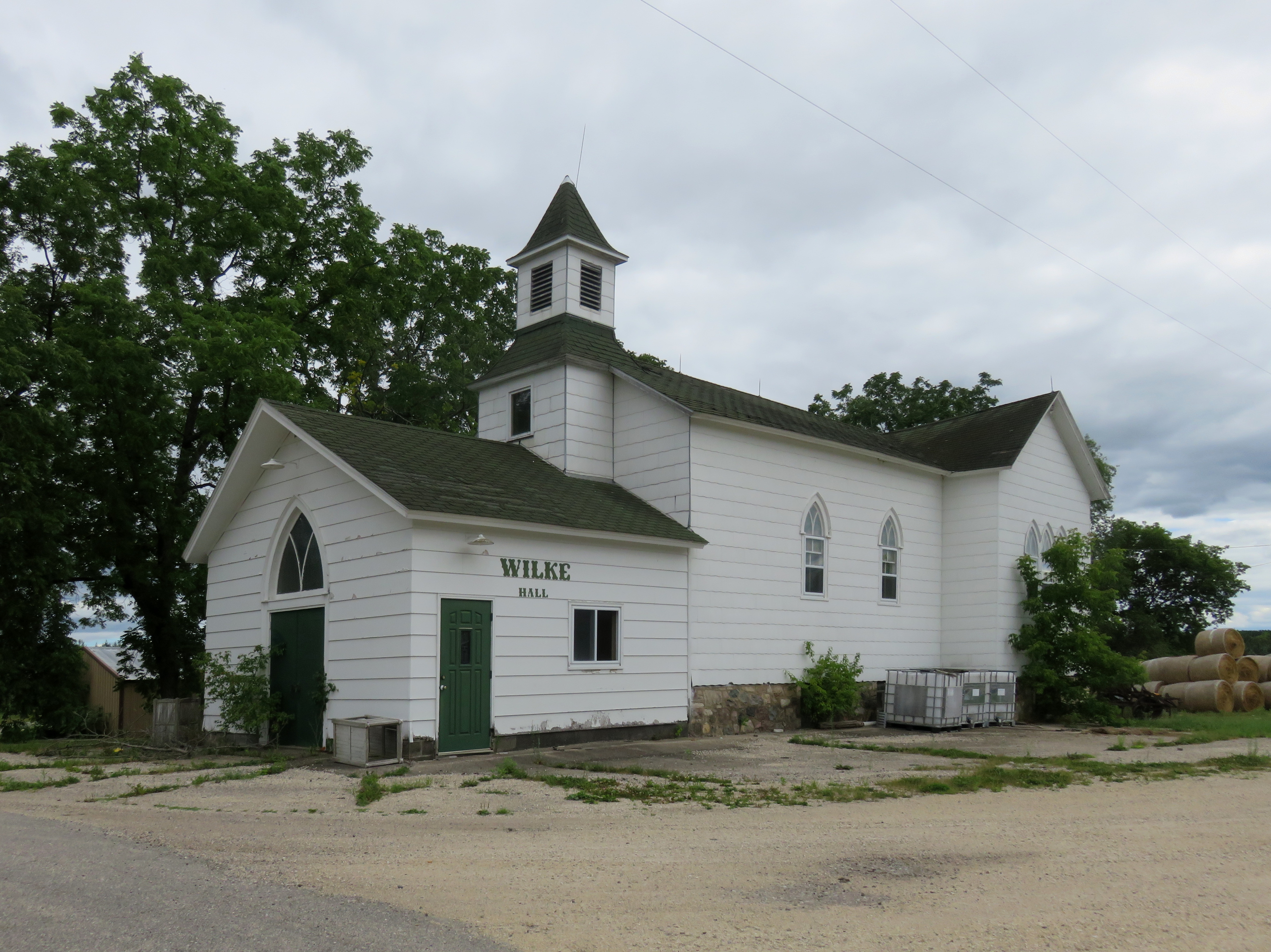
Former Saint Edward's Church in Wagner

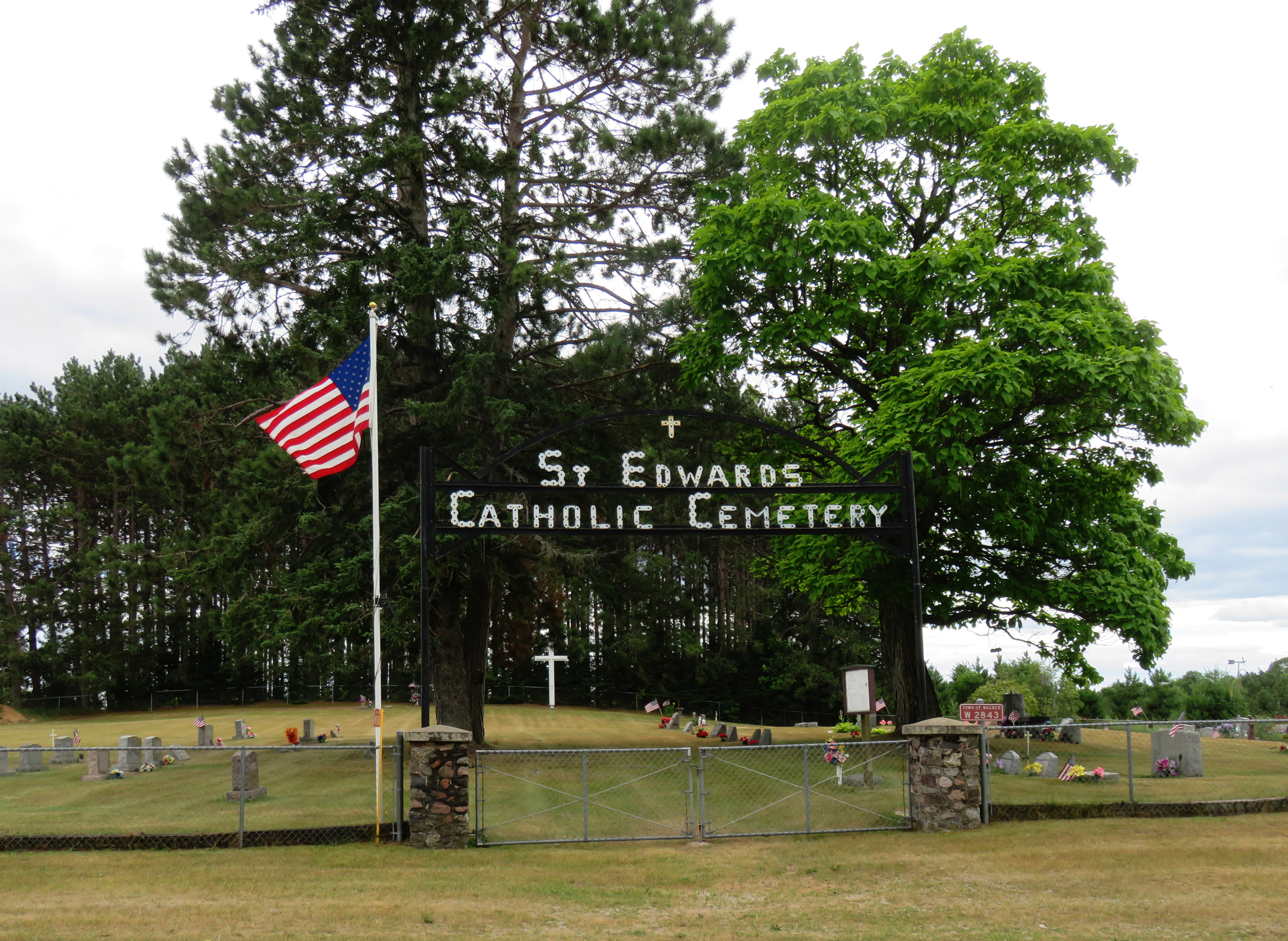
Catholic cemetery in Wagner

Before the church was built in Wagner, masses were initially held by Father Joseph Hemmer (1870–1958) in the 1890s and then regularly celebrated at the Bernardy residence by Father Joseph John Fox. A congregation dedicated to Saint Cecilia was established in 1905, and masses were held in various residences in Wagner. Land for a church was purchased in 1917, and a $500 donation was received in memory of Edward M. Dougherty, due to which the decision was made to dedicate the new church to Saint Edward the Confessor in 1918. The church was a "mission church" (a chapel of ease) subordinated to the parish church in Walsh, and it was built by moving and combining two taverns. The main and side altars, altar stone, and linens were brought from the old church at Walsh. Land for the church cemetery was purchased in 1922. The church was moved further from the road in 1924, when a basement was also added, and electricity was installed in 1948. A new altar for the church was built by Gene Rolkosky in 1966. The church was closed and the property sold in 2004.
