= Goll, Wisconsin =

- Unincorporated community
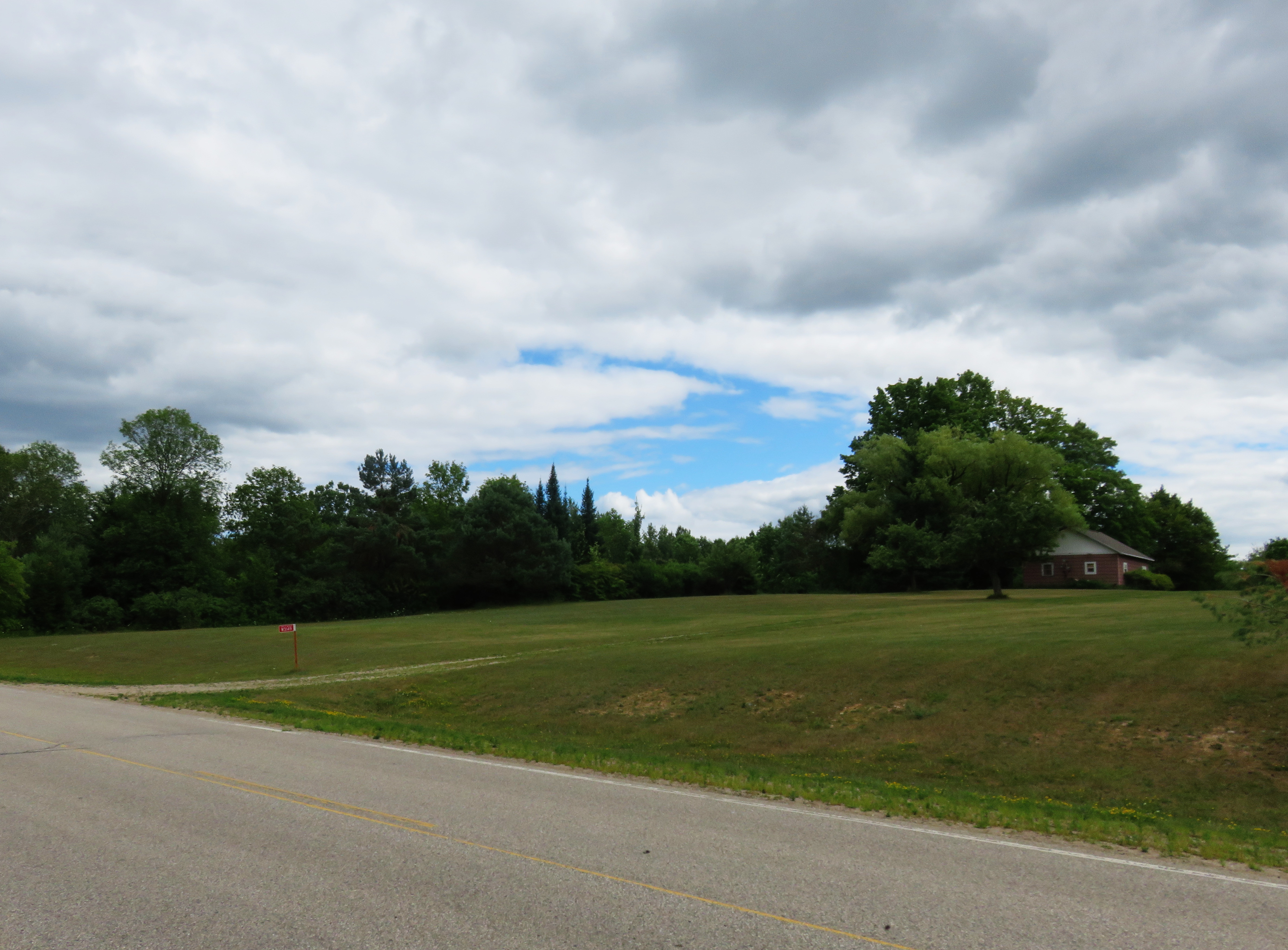

- Location within Wisconsin Location within the United States
- Coordinates: 45°16′49″N 87°45′03″W
- Country: United States
- State: Wisconsin
- County: Marinette
- Elevation: 702 ft (214 m)
- Time zone: UTC-6 (Central (CST))
  - Summer (DST): UTC-5 (CDT)
- Area codes: 715 & 534
- GNIS feature ID: 1565617

Goll is an unincorporated community located in the town of Wagner, Marinette County, Wisconsin, United States.

== Geography ==
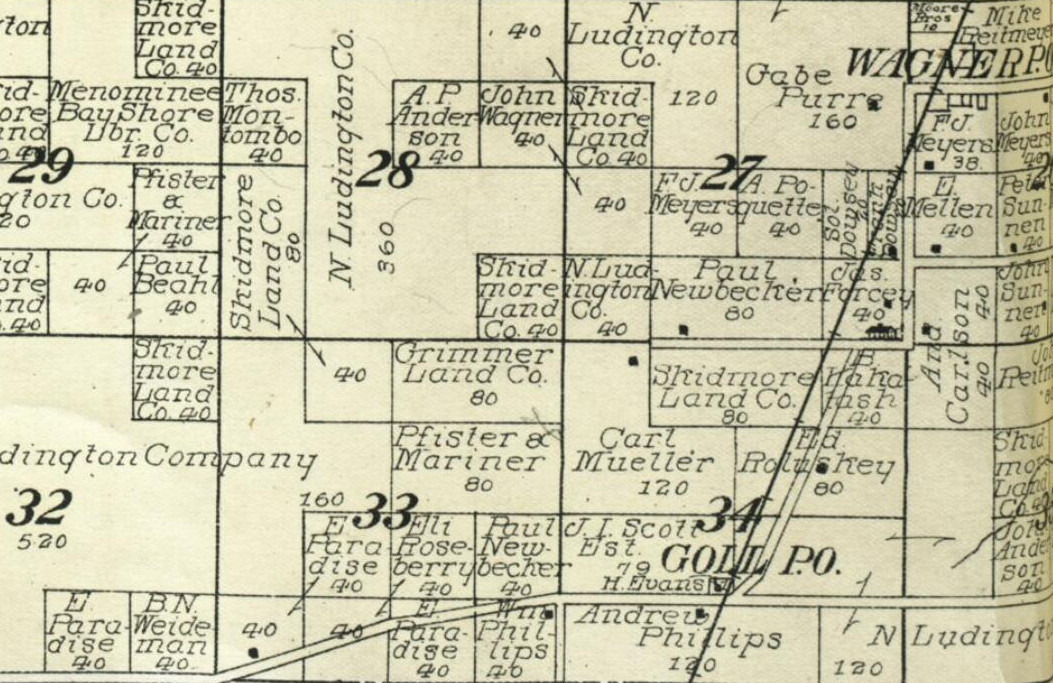
Goll, 1912 map detail

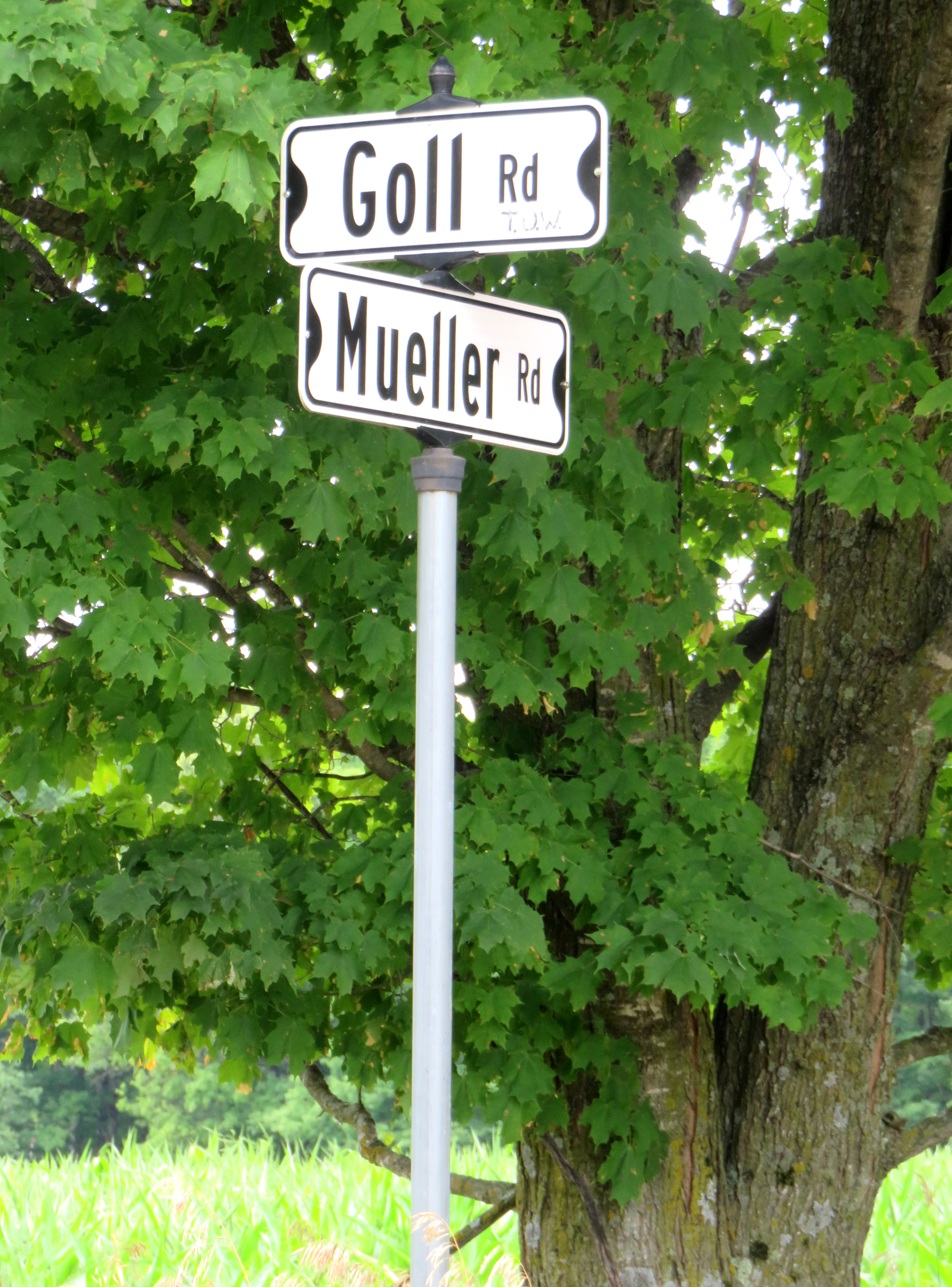
Sign for Goll Road

Goll is located at the intersection of County Trunk Highway X and Old Rail Road (formerly Right of Way Road), at an elevation of 702 feet (214 m). It is connected by road to Wagner to the north, Middle Inlet to the west, and Wisconsin Highway 180 to the east. Goll Road runs obliquely to the east of the former rail line.

== History ==
Goll was a stop between Miles and Wagner on the Wisconsin & Michigan (W. & M.) Railway line from Bagley Junction to Iron Mountain. The rail line through Goll was discontinued in 1938, when the tracks were torn out and the rolling stock sold off. A post office was established in Goll in the 1896, and Edward Ashburton Lindsley (1869–1940) was appointed postmaster at Goll that year, replacing H. S. Brooks. The post office in Goll was closed in 1913.
