= Wilcox, Wisconsin =

- Unincorporated community
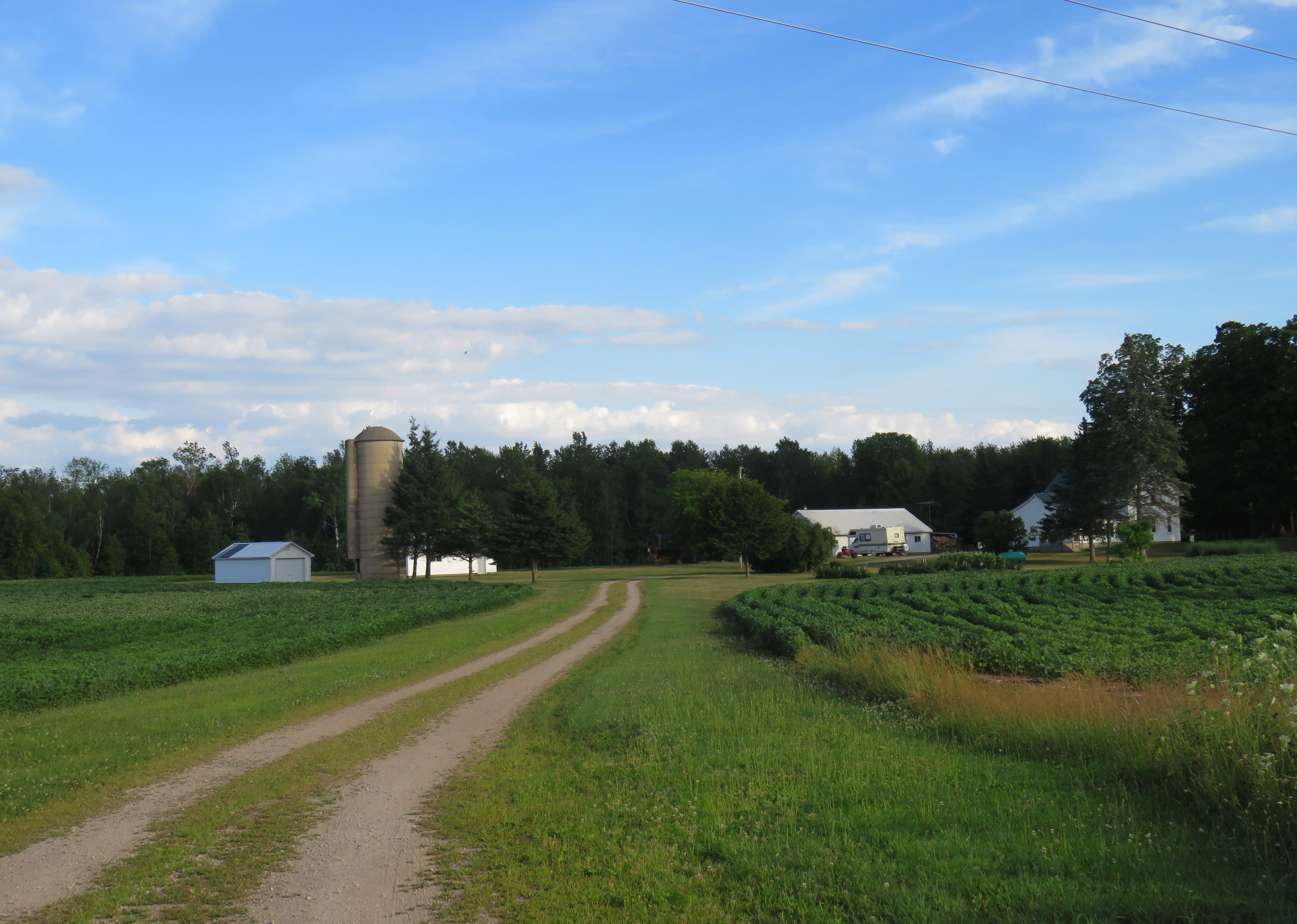

- Location within Wisconsin Location within the United States
- Coordinates: 44°59′52″N 87°50′07″W
- Country: United States
- State: Wisconsin
- County: Marinette
- Elevation: 614 ft (187 m)
- Time zone: UTC-6 (Central (CST))
  - Summer (DST): UTC-5 (CDT)
- Area code: 715 & 534
- GNIS feature ID: 1577885

Wilcox is an unincorporated community located in the town of Grover, Marinette County, Wisconsin, United States. Wilcox is located on the Canadian National Railway, 6 miles (9.7 km) southwest of Peshtigo.

== Name ==
Wilcox was named for a local settler.

== History ==
A creamery operated at Wilcox, owned by the Feifarek family. The creamery was destroyed in a fire in 1909 while operated by F. B. Feifarek, but it was later reopened and run by Lawrence Feifarek. There was formerly a railroad freight station at Wilcox; it was removed in 1935.
