= Marinette County, Wisconsin =

County in Wisconsin, United States

- County
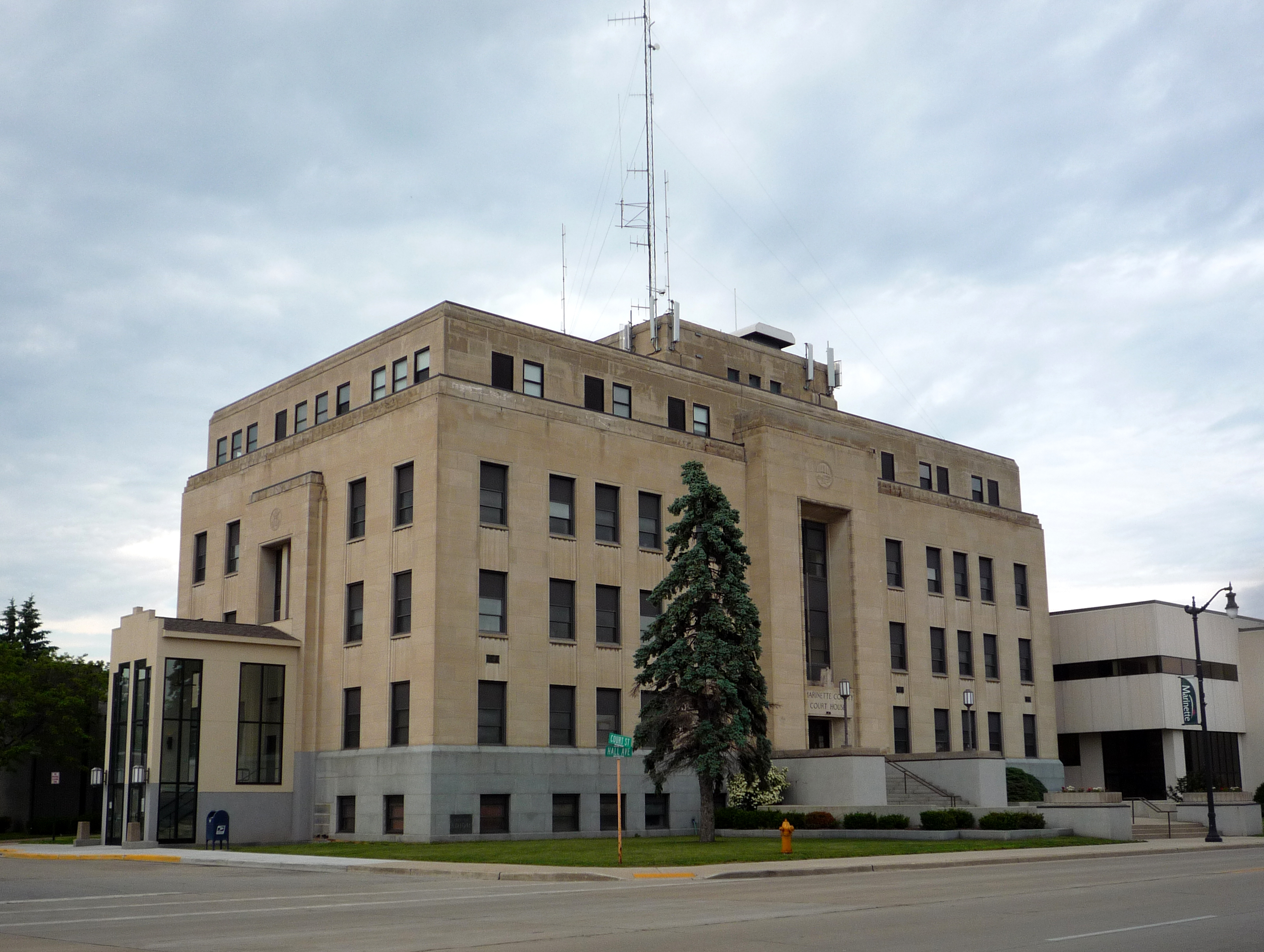
- Marinette County Courthouse, Marinette

- Location within the U.S. state of Wisconsin
- Coordinates: 45°20′N 88°00′W
- Country: United States
- State: Wisconsin
- Founded: 1879
- Seat: Marinette
- Largest city: Marinette

Area
  - Total: 1,550 sq mi (4,000 km^{2})
  - Land: 1,399 sq mi (3,620 km^{2})
  - Water: 151 sq mi (390 km^{2}) 9.7%

Population (2020)
  - Total: 41,872
  - Estimate (2025): 42,574 ▲
  - Density: 29.9/sq mi (11.5/km^{2})
- Time zone: UTC−6 (Central)
  - Summer (DST): UTC−5 (CDT)
- Congressional district: 8th
- Website: www.marinettecountywi.gov

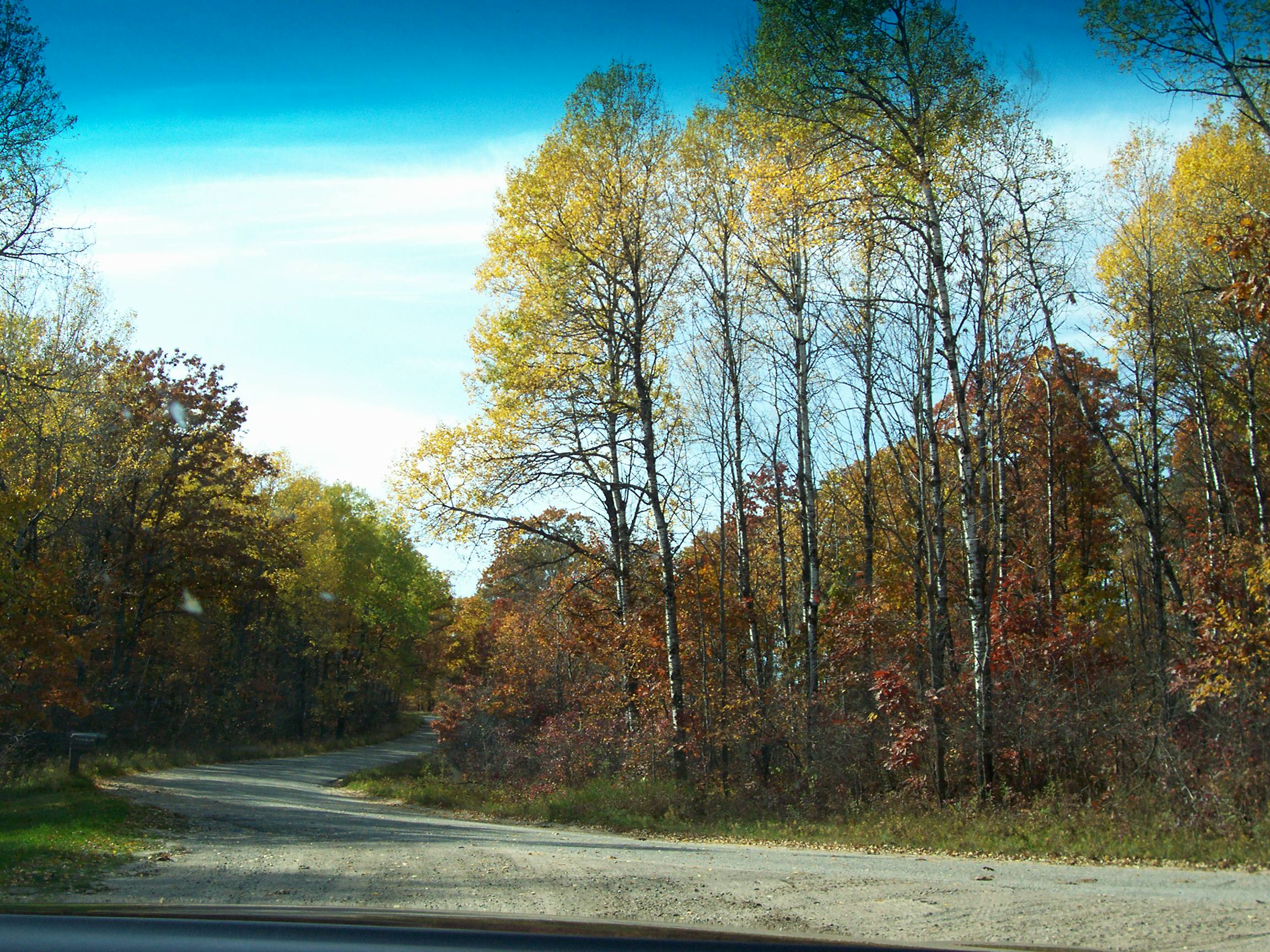
Marinette County woods in fall

Marinette County is a county in the U.S. state of Wisconsin. As of the 2020 census, the population was 41,872. Its county seat is Marinette. Marinette County is part of the Marinette, WI–MI Micropolitan Statistical Area.

== Geography ==
According to the U.S. Census Bureau, the county has a total area of 1,550 square miles (4,000 km^{2}), of which 1,399 square miles (3,620 km^{2}) is land and 151 square miles (390 km^{2}) (9.7%) is water. It is the third-largest county in Wisconsin by land area and fifth-largest by total area. Part of Marinette County borders Lake Michigan, and this area is home to endemic plants.

=== Adjacent counties ===
- Dickinson County, Michigan – north
- Menominee County, Michigan – northeast
- Door County – east and southeast, border is in Green Bay
- Oconto County – southwest
- Forest County – west
- Florence County – northwest

=== Major highways ===
- U.S. 8
- U.S. 41
- U.S. 141
- Highway 64
- Highway 180

=== Railroads ===
- Canadian National
- Escanaba and Lake Superior Railroad
- Watco

=== Airport ===
Crivitz Municipal Airport (FAA LID: 3D1) serves Marinette County and surrounding communities.

== Demographics ==
Historical population
Census	Pop.	Note	%±
1880	8,929		—
1890	20,304		127.4%
1900	30,822		51.8%
1910	33,812		9.7%
1920	34,361		1.6%
1930	33,530		−2.4%
1940	36,225		8.0%
1950	35,748		−1.3%
1960	34,660		−3.0%
1970	35,810		3.3%
1980	39,314		9.8%
1990	40,548		3.1%
2000	43,384		7.0%
2010	41,749		−3.8%
2020	41,872		0.3%
2025 (est.)	42,574	▲	1.7%
U.S. Decennial Census; 1790–1960 1900–1990; 1990–2000 2010 2020

=== Racial and ethnic composition ===
Marinette County, Wisconsin – Racial and ethnic composition Note: the US Census treats Hispanic/Latino as an ethnic category. This table excludes Latinos from the racial categories and assigns them to a separate category. Hispanics/Latinos may be of any race.
Race / ethnicity (NH = Non-Hispanic)	Pop 1980	Pop 1990	Pop 2000	Pop 2010	Pop 2020	% 1980	% 1990	% 2000	% 2010	% 2020
White alone (NH)	39,023	40,164	42,354	40,260	38,754	99.26%	99.05%	97.63%	96.43%	92.55%
Black or African American alone (NH)	13	8	87	106	192	0.03%	0.02%	0.20%	0.25%	0.46%
Native American or Alaska Native alone (NH)	114	149	202	216	203	0.29%	0.37%	0.47%	0.52%	0.48%
Asian alone (NH)	48	63	118	217	180	0.12%	0.16%	0.27%	0.52%	0.43%
Native Hawaiian or Pacific Islander alone (NH)	x	x	8	8	8	x	x	0.02%	0.02%	0.02%
Other race alone (NH)	40	8	11	20	96	0.10%	0.02%	0.03%	0.05%	0.23%
Mixed race or Multiracial (NH)	x	x	279	400	1,360	x	x	0.64%	0.96%	3.25%
Hispanic or Latino (any race)	76	156	325	522	1,079	0.19%	0.38%	0.75%	1.25%	2.58%
Total	39,314	40,548	43,384	41,749	41,872	100.00%	100.00%	100.00%	100.00%	100.00%

=== 2020 census ===
As of the 2020 census, the county had a population of 41,872 and a median age of 49.3 years. 19.0% of residents were under the age of 18 and 25.2% of residents were 65 years of age or older. For every 100 females there were 103.3 males, and for every 100 females age 18 and over there were 102.4 males age 18 and over.

The population density was 29.9 people per square mile (11.5 people/km^{2}). There were 29,189 housing units at an average density of 20.9 units per square mile (8.1 units/km^{2}).

The racial makeup of the county was 93.4% White, 0.5% Black or African American, 0.6% American Indian and Alaska Native, 0.4% Asian, <0.1% Native Hawaiian and Pacific Islander, 1.1% from some other race, and 4.0% from two or more races. Hispanic or Latino residents of any race comprised 2.6% of the population.

39.2% of residents lived in urban areas, while 60.8% lived in rural areas.

There were 18,735 households in the county, of which 22.1% had children under the age of 18 living in them. Of all households, 47.3% were married-couple households, 22.1% were households with a male householder and no spouse or partner present, and 22.4% were households with a female householder and no spouse or partner present. About 32.7% of all households were made up of individuals and 15.5% had someone living alone who was 65 years of age or older.

Of those units, 35.8% were vacant. Among occupied housing units, 76.8% were owner-occupied and 23.2% were renter-occupied. The homeowner vacancy rate was 1.7% and the rental vacancy rate was 5.6%.

=== 2000 census ===
2000 Census Age Pyramid for Marinette County

As of the census of 2000, there were 43,384 people, 17,585 households, and 11,834 families residing in the county. The population density was 31 people per square mile (12 people/km^{2}). There were 26,260 housing units at an average density of 19 units per square mile (7.3 units/km^{2}). The racial makeup of the county was 98.08% White, 0.23% Black or African American, 0.50% Native American, 0.27% Asian, 0.02% Pacific Islander, 0.21% from other races, and 0.69% from two or more races. 0.75% of the population were Hispanic or Latino of any race. 37.8% were of German, 11.7% Polish, 6.4% French and 5.6% American ancestry.

There were 17,585 households, out of which 28.80% had children under the age of 18 living with them, 56.40% were married couples living together, 7.40% had a female householder with no husband present, and 32.70% were non-families. 28.30% of all households were made up of individuals, and 13.30% had someone living alone who was 65 years of age or older. The average household size was 2.38 and the average family size was 2.92.

In the county, the population was spread out, with 23.50% under the age of 18, 8.10% from 18 to 24, 25.90% from 25 to 44, 25.00% from 45 to 64, and 17.60% who were 65 years of age or older. The median age was 40 years. For every 100 females, there were 97.50 males. For every 100 females age 18 and over, there were 95.00 males.

In 2017, there were 383 births, giving a general fertility rate of 61.2 births per 1000 women aged 15–44, the 30th lowest rate out of all 72 Wisconsin counties. Additionally, there were 16 reported induced abortions performed on women of Marinette County residence in 2017.

== Tourism ==
Tourism is important to many of the communities in Marinette County. The county's two main rivers, the Peshtigo and Menominee, and many lakes, streams, and forests make the area an outdoor destination.

Snowmobiling is popular in the winter, and there is a large network of trails to accommodate the sport.

Dave's Falls are located in Marinette County, near Amberg.

== Communities ==
=== Cities ===
- Marinette (county seat)
- Niagara
- Peshtigo

=== Villages ===
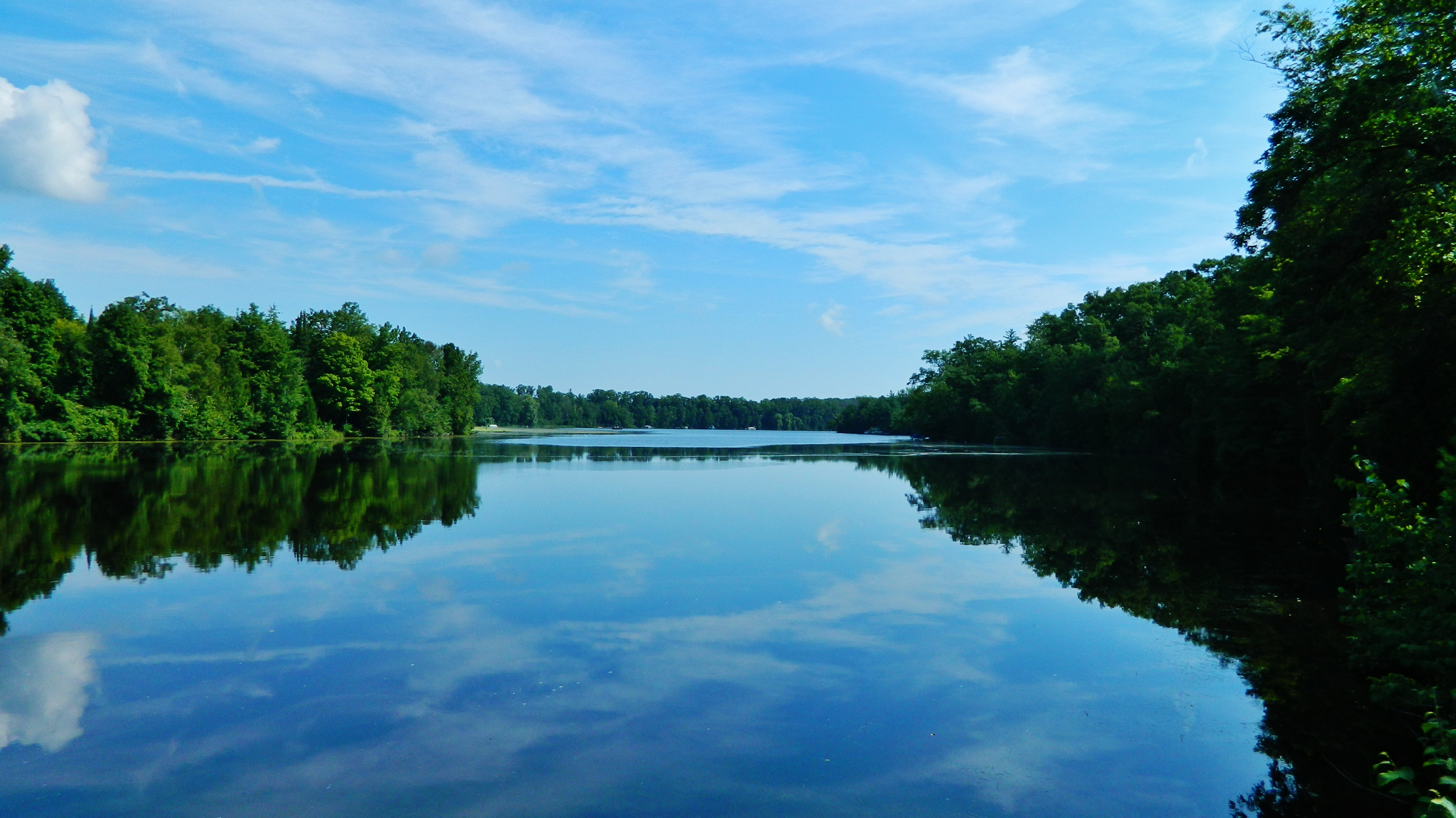
The Peshtigo River as seen from the town of Stephenson

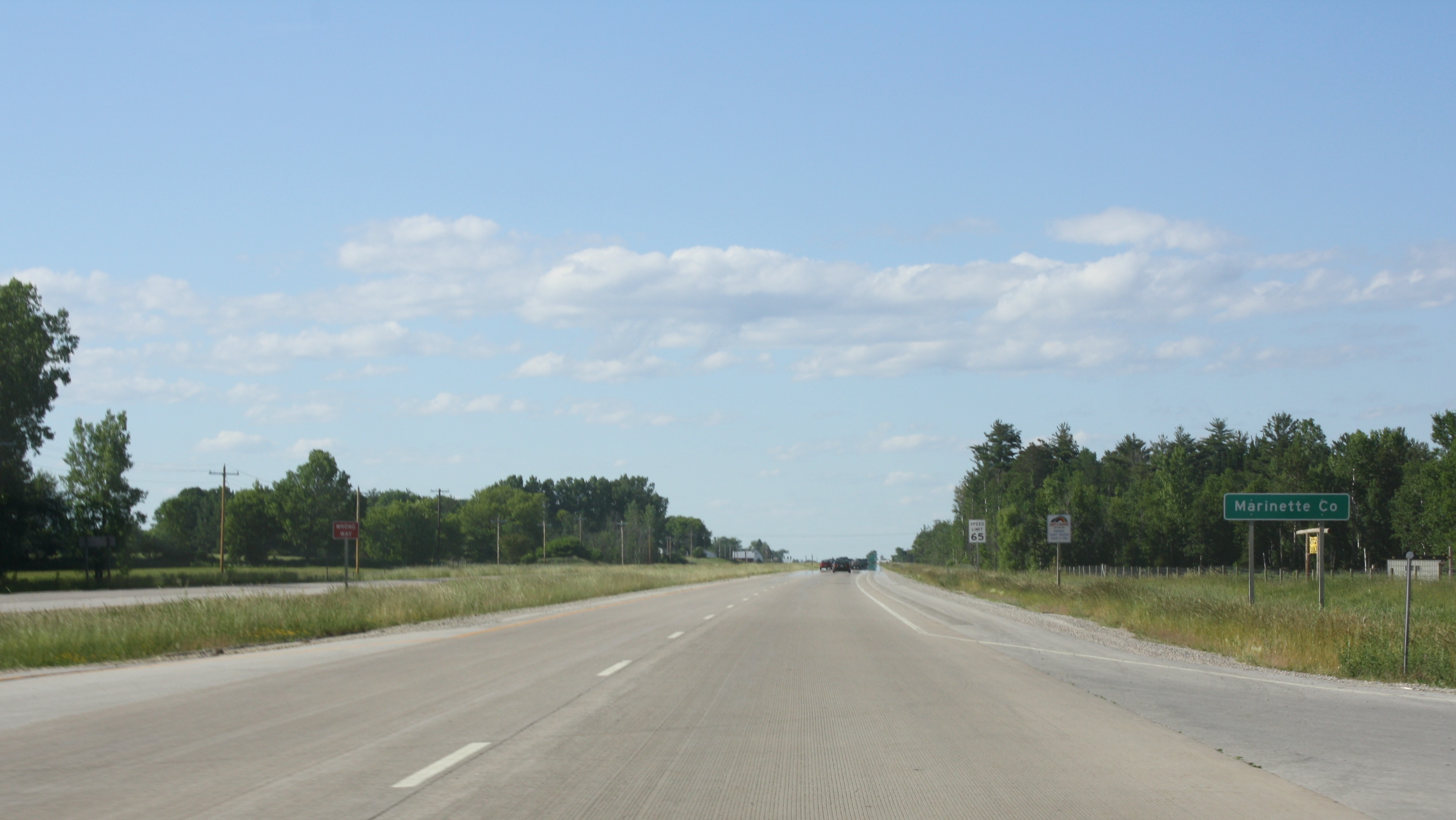
Entering Marinette County on U.S. Route 141

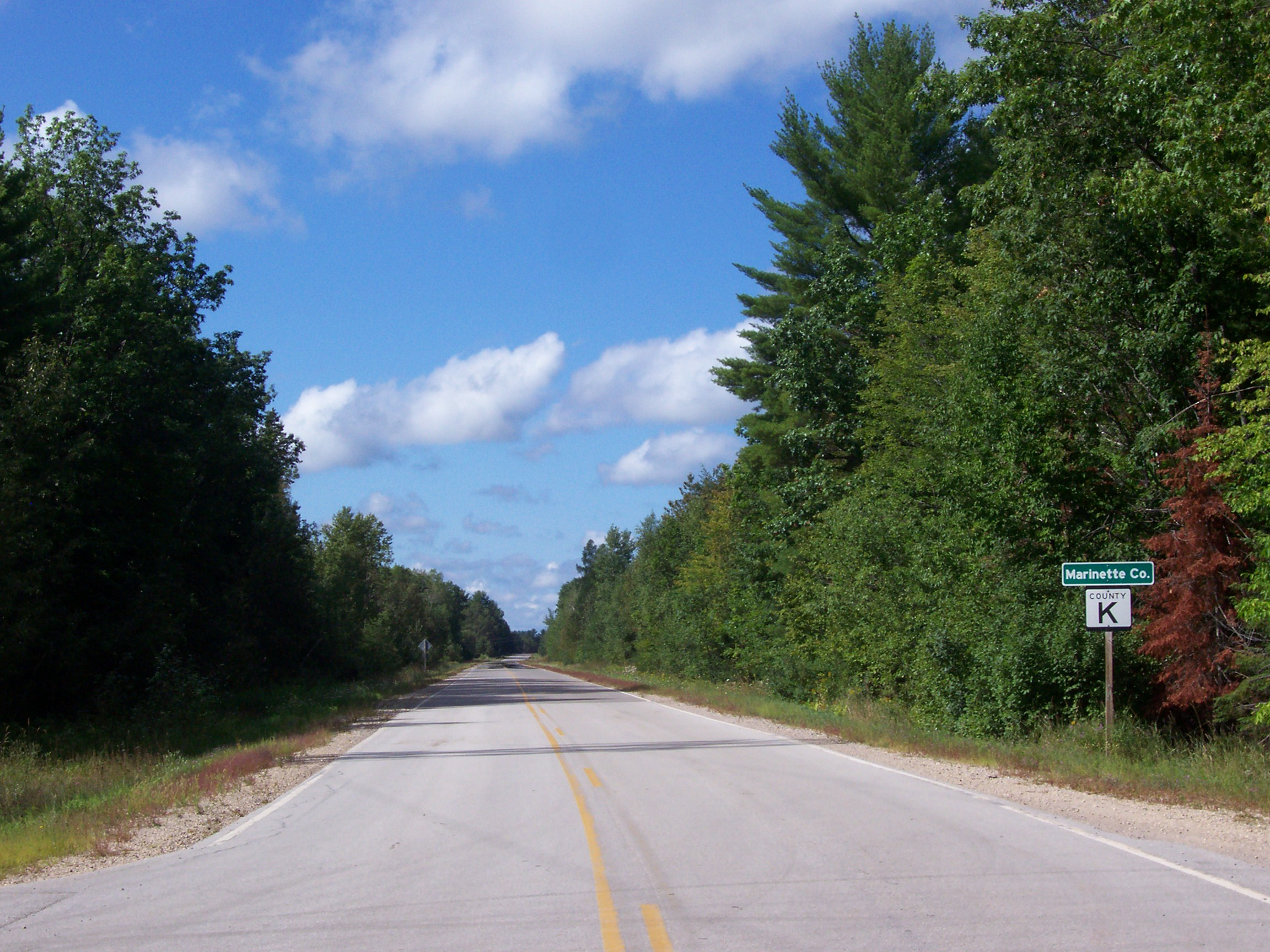
Entering Marinette County at the Menominee River

- Coleman
- Crivitz
- Pound
- Wausaukee

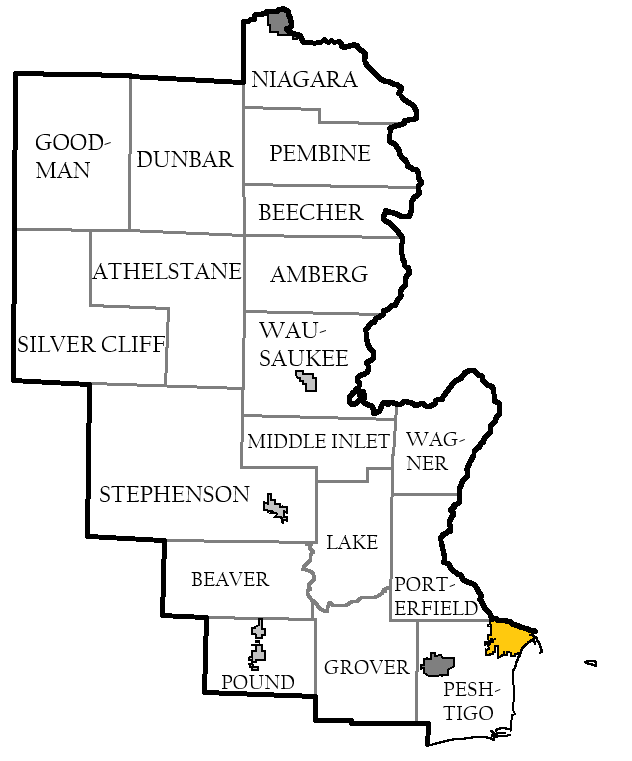
Towns of Marinette County

=== Towns ===
- Amberg
- Athelstane
- Beaver
- Beecher
- Dunbar
- Goodman
- Grover
- Lake
- Middle Inlet
- Niagara
- Pembine
- Peshtigo
- Porterfield
- Pound
- Silver Cliff
- Stephenson
- Wagner
- Wausaukee

=== Census-designated places ===
- Amberg
- Dunbar
- Goodman
- Pembine

=== Other unincorporated communities ===
- Athelstane
- Bagley Junction
- Beaver
- Beecher
- Beecher Lake
- Cedarville
- County Line (partial)
- Goll
- Harmony
- Loomis
- Kremlin
- McAllister
- May Corner
- Menekaunee
- Middle Inlet
- Miles
- Packard
- Porterfield
- Rubys Corner
- Sweetheart City
- Walsh
- Wagner
- White Pine Haven
- Wilcox

== Politics ==
United States presidential election results for Marinette County, Wisconsin
Year	Republican		Democratic		Third party(ies)	
Year	No.	%	No.	%	No.	%
1892	1,837	42.87%	1,994	46.53%	454	10.60%
1896	4,277	68.26%	1,867	29.80%	122	1.95%
1900	4,237	70.98%	1,535	25.72%	197	3.30%
1904	3,977	77.30%	816	15.86%	352	6.84%
1908	3,454	63.45%	1,597	29.34%	393	7.22%
1912	1,618	34.55%	1,559	33.29%	1,506	32.16%
1916	2,767	53.12%	2,205	42.33%	237	4.55%
1920	6,138	75.55%	1,314	16.17%	672	8.27%
1924	4,911	54.68%	571	6.36%	3,499	38.96%
1928	6,516	57.04%	4,781	41.85%	127	1.11%
1932	5,249	43.08%	6,508	53.41%	428	3.51%
1936	4,938	34.60%	8,884	62.25%	450	3.15%
1940	7,688	49.65%	7,703	49.75%	92	0.59%
1944	7,159	52.21%	6,483	47.28%	70	0.51%
1948	5,869	46.71%	6,468	51.48%	228	1.81%
1952	9,313	61.73%	5,727	37.96%	47	0.31%
1956	8,874	63.12%	5,113	36.37%	73	0.52%
1960	8,205	52.50%	7,408	47.40%	17	0.11%
1964	5,332	35.52%	9,657	64.32%	24	0.16%
1968	7,134	48.24%	6,415	43.37%	1,241	8.39%
1972	8,740	57.36%	5,900	38.72%	598	3.92%
1976	8,591	49.30%	8,482	48.68%	352	2.02%
1980	10,444	54.49%	7,718	40.27%	1,005	5.24%
1984	11,444	62.35%	6,798	37.04%	111	0.60%
1988	9,637	54.25%	8,030	45.20%	97	0.55%
1992	7,984	37.85%	7,626	36.15%	5,483	25.99%
1996	7,231	39.70%	8,413	46.18%	2,572	14.12%
2000	10,535	52.88%	8,676	43.55%	710	3.56%
2004	11,866	53.28%	10,190	45.76%	214	0.96%
2008	9,726	45.76%	11,195	52.67%	334	1.57%
2012	10,619	51.11%	9,882	47.56%	276	1.33%
2016	13,122	64.50%	6,409	31.50%	812	3.99%
2020	15,304	66.60%	7,366	32.06%	309	1.34%
2024	16,670	68.28%	7,415	30.37%	330	1.35%

== See also ==
- Ansul Islands
- Green Island (Wisconsin)
- National Register of Historic Places listings in Marinette County, Wisconsin
- USS Marinette County (LST-953)
