= Packard, Wisconsin =

- Unincorporated community
- Location within Wisconsin Location within the United States
- Coordinates: 45°21′17″N 87°41′39″W
- Country: United States
- State: Wisconsin
- County: Marinette
- Elevation: 692 ft (211 m)
- Time zone: UTC-6 (Central (CST))
  - Summer (DST): UTC-5 (CDT)
- Area codes: 715 & 534
- GNIS feature ID: 1577764

Packard is an unincorporated community located in the town of Wagner, Marinette County, Wisconsin, United States.

== Geography ==
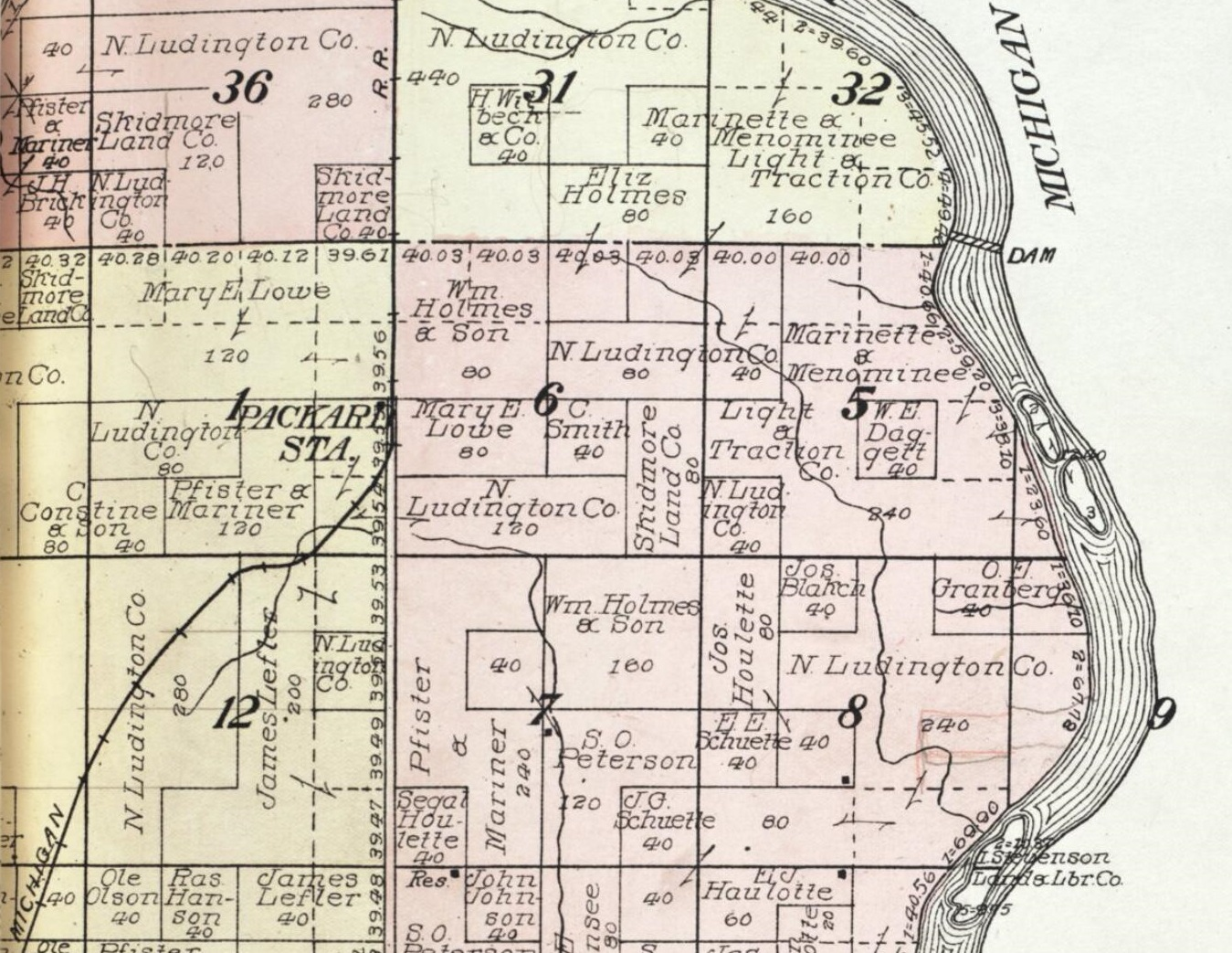
Packard, 1912 map detail

Packard is located at the intersection of Country Trunk Highway RR and Chapin Road, at an elevation of 692 feet (211 m). It is connected by road to McAllister to the south and Koss, Michigan to the north.

== History ==
Packard was a stop between McAllister and Koss on the Wisconsin & Michigan (W. & M.) Railway line from Bagley Junction to Iron Mountain. The rail line through Packard was discontinued in 1938, when the tracks were torn out and the rolling stock sold off. The entire town was destroyed by a forest fire in October, 1908.
