= Middle Inlet (community), Wisconsin =

Middle Inlet, Wisconsin
- Unincorporated community
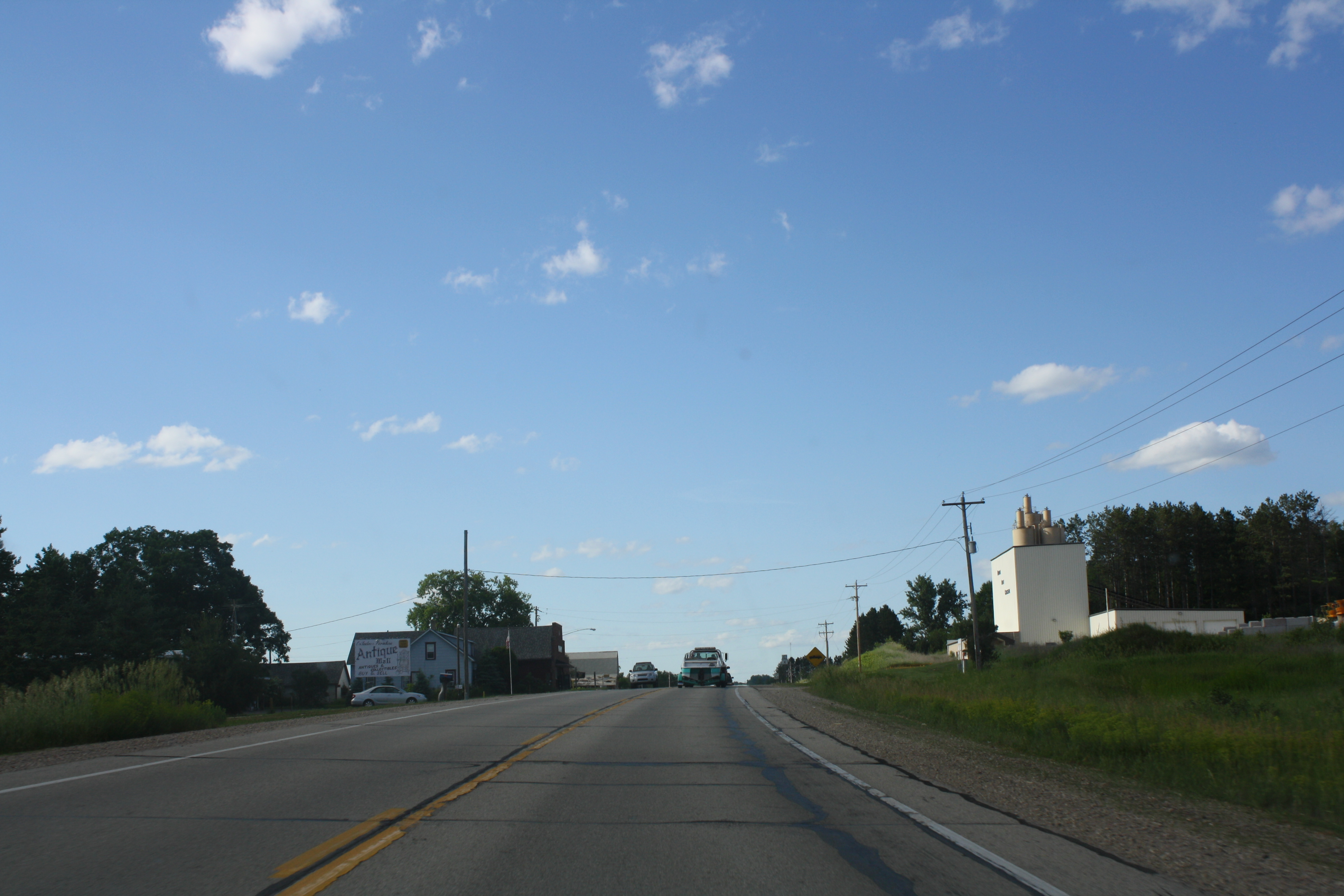
- Downtown Middle Inlet

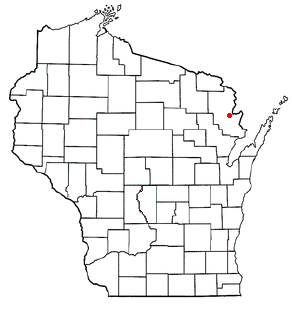
- Location in Wisconsin
- Coordinates: 45°17′30″N 87°59′32″W
- Country: United States
- State: Wisconsin
- County: Marinette
- Elevation: 722 ft (220 m)
- Time zone: UTC-6 (Central (CST))
  - Summer (DST): UTC-5 (CDT)
- Area codes: 715 & 534
- GNIS feature ID: 1569420

Middle Inlet is an unincorporated community in Marinette County, Wisconsin, United States, in the town of Middle Inlet.

== Geography ==
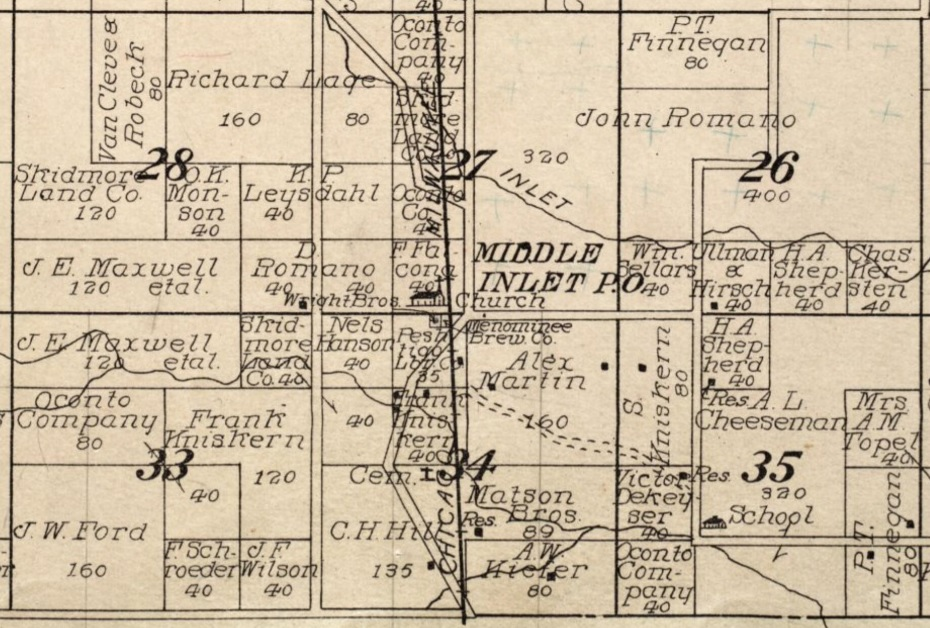
Middle Inlet, 1912 map detail

Middle Inlet is located 6 miles (9.7 km) south of the village of Wausaukee, at the intersection of U.S. Highway 141 and County Highway X at an elevation of 722 feet (220 m). It is located along the Escanaba and Lake Superior Railroad. Middle Inlet is connected by road to Wausaukee to the north and Crivitz to the south (both via Highway 141), and Goll to the east (via Highway X). Middle Inlet Creek runs north of the settlement, and Lower Middle Inlet Creek flows to the south; a third stream, Upper Middle Inlet Creek, flows further north. All three streams feed Lake Noquebay, which lies to the southeast.

== History ==
A post office was established in Middle Inlet in 1890, and it operated until 1974. Middle Inlet was formally established in 1910, when it was separated from the town of Wausaukee. It is named for Middle Inlet Creek, one of three streams flowing into Lake Noquebay. On October 9, 1910, a log train wreck in Middle Inlet killed one man and injured two others. The accident partially destroyed the railroad depot at Middle Inlet. The settlement formerly had a cheese factory and a sawmill. In the 1950s and 1960s a ski area called Fun Valley operated just west of Middle Inlet; it was shut down around 1970.

== Images ==
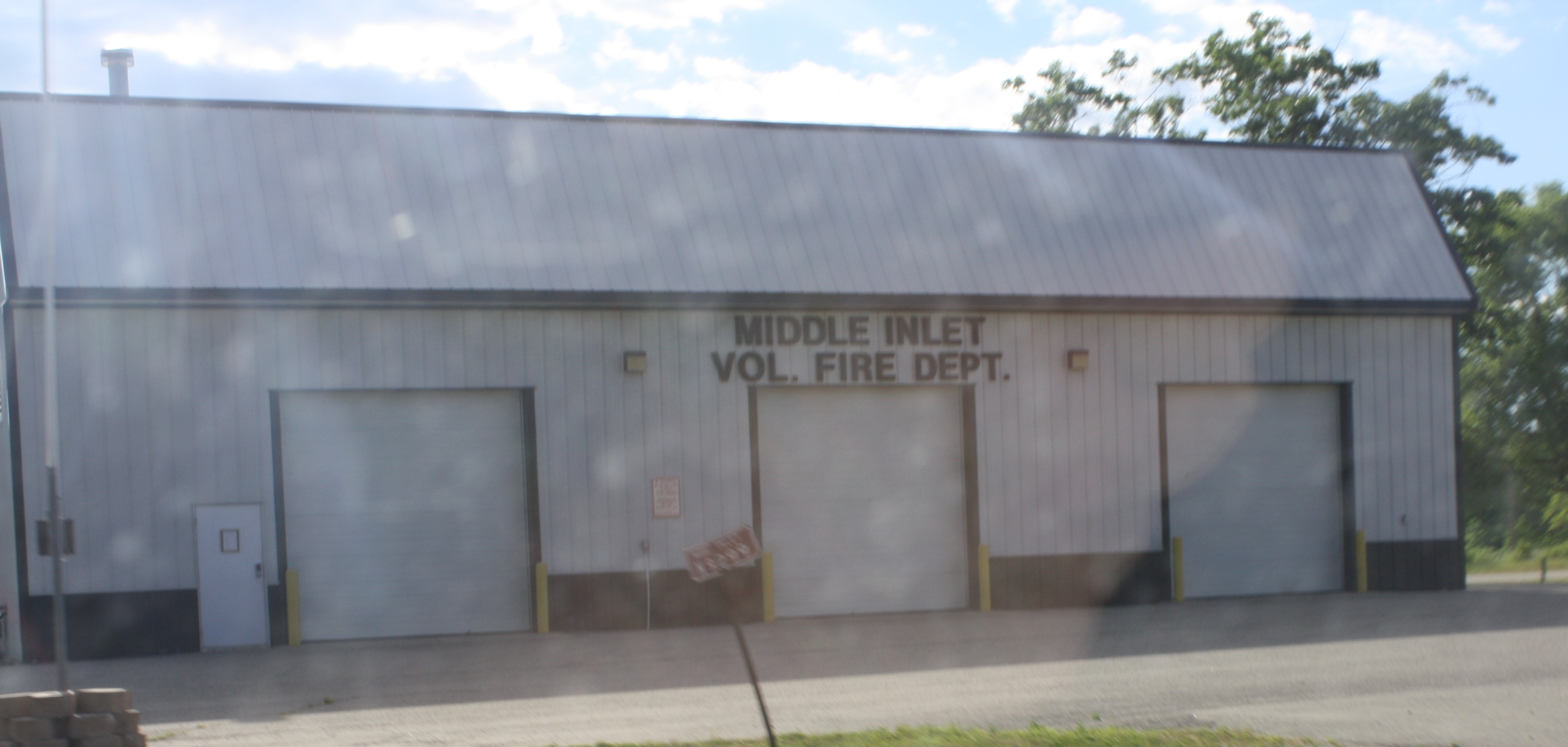
Fire station

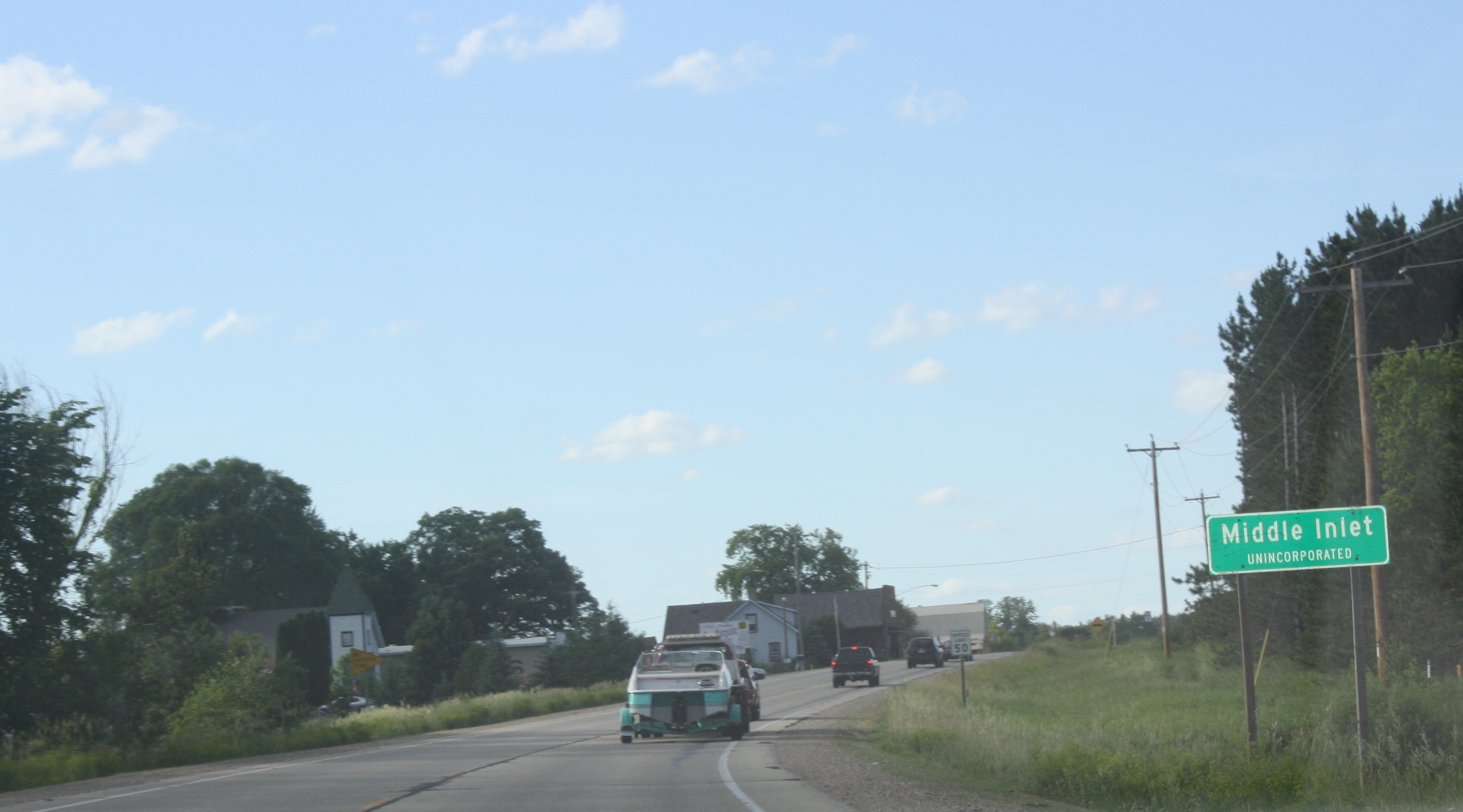
Sign on U.S. Route 141
