= McAllister, Wisconsin =

- Unincorporated community
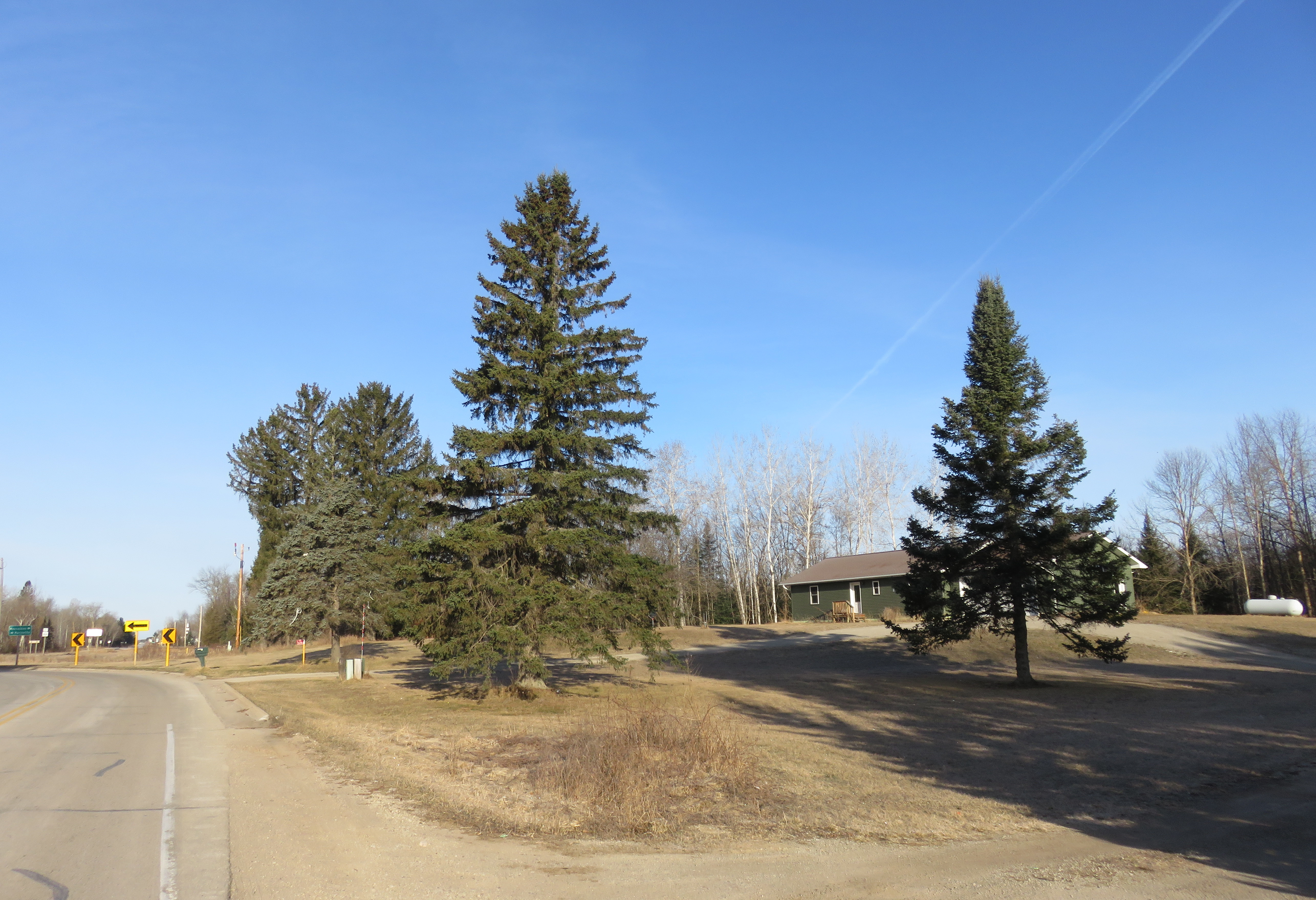

- Location within Wisconsin Location within the United States
- Coordinates: 45°19′38″N 87°43′16″W
- Country: United States
- State: Wisconsin
- County: Marinette
- Elevation: 692 ft (211 m)
- Time zone: UTC-6 (Central (CST))
  - Summer (DST): UTC-5 (CDT)
- Area codes: 715 & 534
- GNIS feature ID: 1569158

McAllister is an unincorporated community located in the town of Wagner, Marinette County, Wisconsin, United States.

== Geography ==
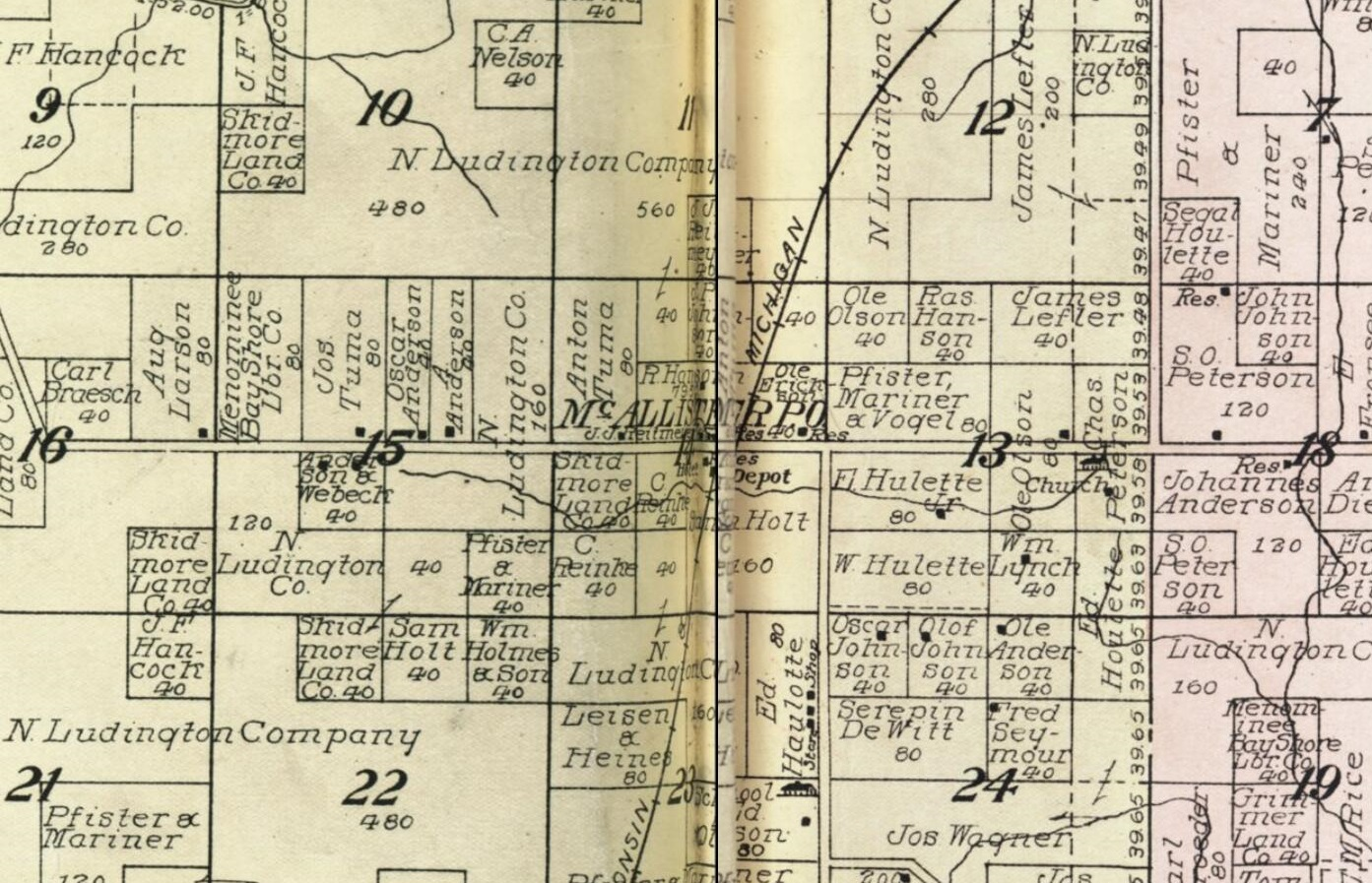
McAllister, 1912 map detail

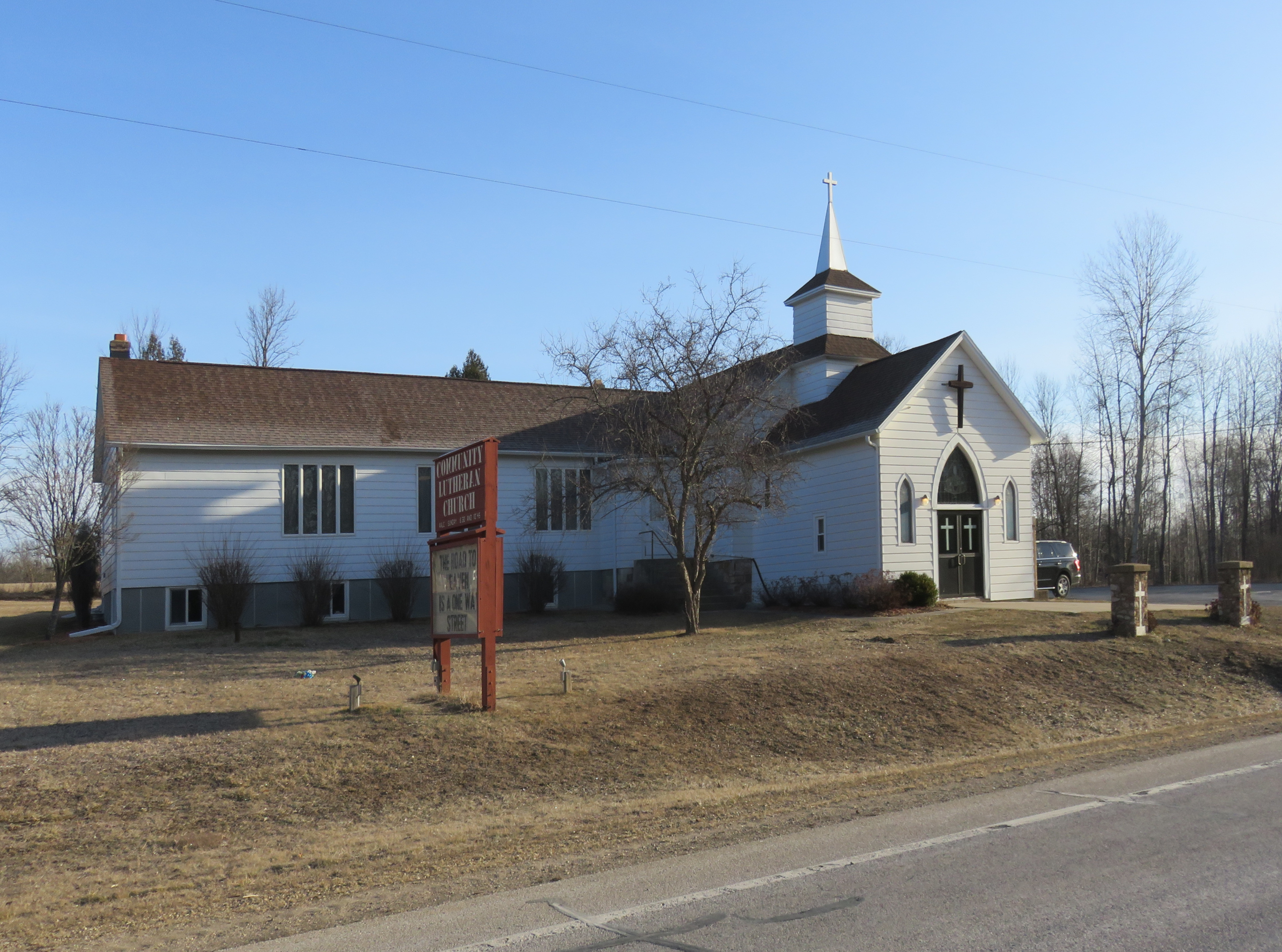
Lutheran church

McAllister is located at the intersection of Wisconsin Highway 180 and County Highway JJ, 11.5 miles (18.5 km) east-southeast of Wausaukee at an elevation of 692 feet (211 m). It is connected by road to Wausaukee to the west, Packard to the north, Wagner to the south, and Wallace, Michigan, to the east via a bridge across the Menominee River. There is a Lutheran church in the community, and the Wagner town hall and Tabor Lutheran Cemetery are located to the east.

== History ==
McAllister was a stop between Wagner and Packard on the Wisconsin & Michigan (W. & M.) Railway line from Bagley Junction to Iron Mountain. The rail line through McAllister was discontinued in 1938, when the tracks were torn out and the rolling stock sold off. A post office was established in McAllister in 1895 and operated until 1966. Segal Haulotte (1871–1939) served as the first postmaster at McAllister; he held the position for 26 years and also operated a general store. Mike Pissato operated a cheese factory in McAllister in the 1920s. The cheese factory was purchased by Theodore Phillips in 1929. In 1946, the Franciscan Friars of the Assumption of the Blessed Virgin Mary Province in Pulaski purchased a riverside property in McAllister as a summer camp and retreat, dubbing it Villa Alvernia.
