= Silver Cliff, Wisconsin =

- Town
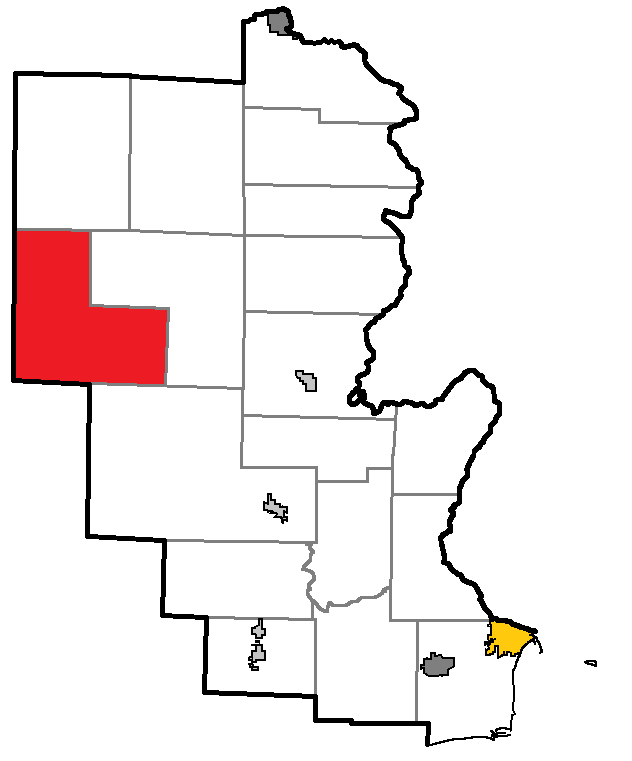
- Location of Silver Cliff, within Marinette County
- Coordinates: 45°25′22″N 88°18′39″W
- Country: United States
- State: Wisconsin
- County: Marinette

Area
  - Total: 107.0 sq mi (277.1 km^{2})
  - Land: 106.4 sq mi (275.5 km^{2})
  - Water: 0.62 sq mi (1.6 km^{2})
- Elevation: 1,158 ft (353 m)

Population (2020)
  - Total: 514
  - Density: 4.83/sq mi (1.87/km^{2})
- Time zone: UTC-6 (Central (CST))
  - Summer (DST): UTC-5 (CDT)
- FIPS code: 55-73975
- GNIS feature ID: 1584161
- Website: https://www.silvercliffwi.com/

Silver Cliff is a town in Marinette County, Wisconsin, United States. As of the 2020 census, the town had a population of 514. It was originally called Rat River when it was formed in 1920.

== History ==
The town was originally called Rat River when it was separated from the Town of Athelstane in March 1920, but was renamed Silver Cliff in June 1920.

On June 15, 2022, the town had suffered an EF2 Tornado. This had destroyed the town's public safety building and caused an estimated $3–5 million in damage. Nobody was injured.

Famous drag queen and winner of the third season of RuPaul's Drag Race All Stars, Trixie Mattel, was raised in the town until the age of 18, when they relocated to Milwaukee to pursue a tertiary education.

== Geography ==
According to the United States Census Bureau, the town has a total area of 107.0 square miles (277.1 km^{2}), of which 106.4 square miles (275.5 km^{2}) is land and 0.6 square mile (1.6 km^{2}) (0.59%) is water.

== Demographics ==
As of the census of 2000, there were 529 people, 216 households, and 157 families residing in the town. The population density was 5.0 inhabitants per square mile (1.9/km^{2}). There were 963 housing units at an average density of 9.1 per square mile (3.5/km^{2}). The racial makeup of the town was 98.11% White, 0.19% African American, 0.76% Native American, and 0.95% from two or more races. Hispanic or Latino of any race were 0.19% of the population.

There were 216 households, out of which 19.4% had children under the age of 18 living with them, 69.4% were married couples living together, 0.9% had a female householder with no husband present, and 26.9% were non-families. 25.0% of all households were made up of individuals, and 10.2% had someone living alone who was 65 years of age or older. The average household size was 2.45 and the average family size was 2.92.

In the town, the population was spread out, with 23.4% under the age of 18, 4.2% from 18 to 24, 20.8% from 25 to 44, 35.2% from 45 to 64, and 16.4% who were 65 years of age or older. The median age was 46 years. For every 100 females, there were 114.2 males. For every 100 females age 18 and over, there were 110.9 males.

The median income for a household in the town was $31,053, and the median income for a family was $33,000. Males had a median income of $33,750 versus $22,500 for females. The per capita income for the town was $15,956. About 6.5% of families and 15.1% of the population were below the poverty line, including 36.4% of those under age 18 and 12.0% of those age 65 or over.
