= Loomis, Wisconsin =

- Unincorporated community
- Location within Wisconsin Location within the United States
- Coordinates: 45°11′33″N 87°53′57″W
- Country: United States
- State: Wisconsin
- County: Marinette
- Elevation: 692 ft (211 m)
- Time zone: UTC-6 (Central (CST))
  - Summer (DST): UTC-5 (CDT)
- Area codes: 715 & 534
- GNIS feature ID: 1568616

Loomis is an unincorporated community located in the town of Lake, Marinette County, Wisconsin, United States.

== Geography ==
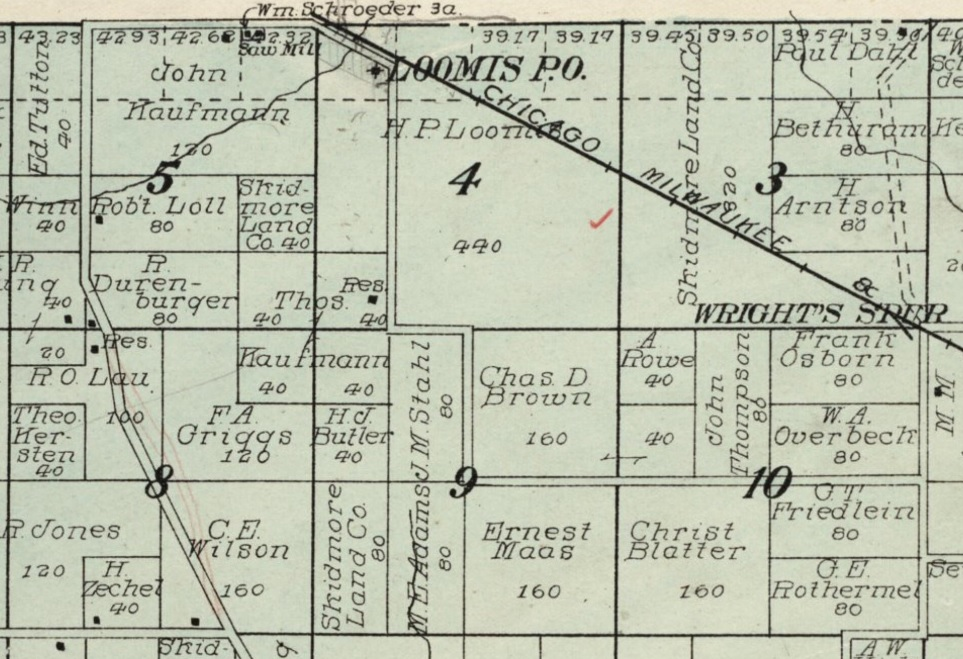
Loomis, 1912 map detail

Loomis is located along the Escanaba and Lake Superior Railroad at the intersection of Loomis Road and County Highway G, at an elevation of 692 feet (211 m). It is connected by road to Crivitz (County Highway W) to the west, Lake Noquebay (via County Highway GG) to the north, Walsh (via County Highway G) to the east, and Porterfield (via County Highway E) to the southeast.

== History ==
A post office formerly operated in Loomis, but was shut down in 1933. In 1911 a grocery store was established by Joseph Schroeder (1885–1931), an early settler who also served as postmaster, and soon afterward a cheese factory was started by Bonaventura Cubalchini (1885–1948). In 1915, the railroad removed the station agent at Loomis due to the low volume of traffic there, and the depot was removed by the 1970s. The local school in Loomis closed in the 1990s.
