= Middle Inlet, Wisconsin =

- Town
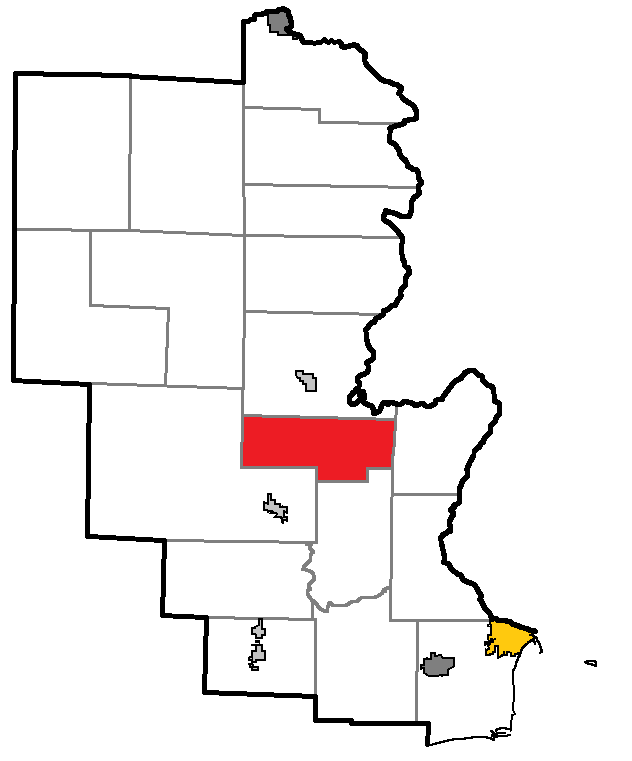
- Location of Middle Inlet, within Marinette County
- Coordinates: 45°17′3″N 87°56′7″W
- Country: United States
- State: Wisconsin
- County: Marinette

Area
  - Total: 51.5 sq mi (133.4 km^{2})
  - Land: 50.7 sq mi (131.4 km^{2})
  - Water: 0.77 sq mi (2.0 km^{2})
- Elevation: 686 ft (209 m)

Population (2020)
  - Total: 851
  - Density: 16.8/sq mi (6.48/km^{2})
- Time zone: UTC-6 (Central (CST))
  - Summer (DST): UTC-5 (CDT)
- FIPS code: 55-51537
- GNIS feature ID: 1583710
- Website: https://www.townofmiddleinletwi.gov/

Middle Inlet is a town in Marinette County, Wisconsin, United States. The population was 851 at the 2020 census.

== Communities ==
- Middle Inlet is an unincorporated community located on US Highway 141 south of its junction with County Road X.
- Sweetheart City is a mostly residential community located near a local lake north of an access road leading to County Road X.

== Geography ==
According to the United States Census Bureau, the town has a total area of 51.5 square miles (133.4 km^{2}), of which 50.7 square miles (131.4 km^{2}) is land and 0.8 square mile (2.0 km^{2}) (1.50%) is water.

== Demographics ==
As of the census of 2000, there were 831 people, 366 households, and 245 families residing in the town. The population density was 16.4 inhabitants per square mile (6.3/km^{2}). There were 643 housing units at an average density of 12.7 per square mile (4.9/km^{2}). The racial makeup of the town was 98.32% White, 0.24% African American, 0.72% Native American, 0.24% Asian, and 0.48% from two or more races. Hispanic or Latino of any race were 0.12% of the population.

There were 366 households, out of which 21.9% had children under the age of 18 living with them, 59.8% were married couples living together, 4.9% had a female householder with no husband present, and 32.8% were non-families. 27.6% of all households were made up of individuals, and 12.6% had someone living alone who was 65 years of age or older. The average household size was 2.27 and the average family size was 2.77.

In the town, the population was spread out, with 19.0% under the age of 18, 5.4% from 18 to 24, 22.3% from 25 to 44, 32.1% from 45 to 64, and 21.2% who were 65 years of age or older. The median age was 46 years. For every 100 females, there were 103.2 males. For every 100 females age 18 and over, there were 105.2 males.

The median income for a household in the town was $32,054, and the median income for a family was $36,750. Males had a median income of $29,808 versus $17,969 for females. The per capita income for the town was $16,082. About 6.1% of families and 9.4% of the population were below the poverty line, including 14.7% of those under age 18 and 8.4% of those age 65 or over.
