= Milwaukee Road Depot =

Milwaukee Road Depot can refer to the following former and active train stations used by the Chicago, Milwaukee, St. Paul and Pacific Railroad:, Chicago, Milwaukee & St Paul, Chicago, Milwaukee & Puget Sound Railway, Idaho & Washington Northern and Washington, Idaho & Montana RY, Plus all other former variations of the Milwaukee Road. The published September 1910 passenger schedule lists over 1300 stops. Most of these had permanent structures.

== Idaho ==
MAINLINE

- Avery Depot – located on the mainline from Chicago, Illinois to Tacoma, Washington
- St Maries Depot - now used as the St Maries River Railroad office.
- Worley Depot

BRANCHLINES

- Fernwood Depot - Elk River Branch. owned by STMA, unused
- Potlatch Depot - built by the WI&M, now a museum
- Princeton Depot - built by the WI&M. moved to Potlatch, ID
- Bovill Depot - Elk River Branch
- Coeur d'Alene Depot - Coeur D'Alene Branch
- Deary Depot - built by the WI&M. Now a B&B
- Elk River Depot - Elk River Branch
- Rathdrum Depot - built by the I&WN, private residence

== Iowa ==
- Albert City Depot – located on a branch line from Des Moines, Iowa to Spencer, Iowa
- Browns Depot - locited in the corridor between Chicago and Omaha
- Calmar Passenger Depot – located on the line from Madison, Wisconsin to Rapid City, South Dakota
- Charles City Depot – located on the line from Madison, Wisconsin to Rapid City, South Dakota
- Clear Lake Depot – located on the line from Madison, Wisconsin to Rapid City, South Dakota
- Davenport Freighthouse – located on the mainline from Chicago, Illinois to Kansas City, Missouri
- Decorah Combination Depot – located on a branch line from Conover to Decorah
- Delmar Depot – located on the mainline from Chicago, Illinois to Omaha, Nebraska
- Elk River Depot - located on the main line between Chicago and Omaha
- Fayette Depot – located on the line from Jackson Junction to Cedar Rapids
- Grafton Depot - located on the line from Mason City to Austin, Minnesota
- Hornick Combination Depot – located along the abandoned Sioux City Branch that operated from 1887 to 1980. It has been converted into a museum.
- Jefferson Depot - located on the line from Spirit Lake to Des Moines
- Knoke Depot - located on the line between Des Moines and Spirit Lake
- La Motte Depot – located on the line from Bellevue to Cascade
- Mason City Depot – located on the line from Chicago, Illinois to Rapid City, South Dakota
- New Albin Depot – located on the line from La Crescent, Minnesota to Davenport, Iowa
- Preston Depot – located on the line from Elk River Junction to Delmar
- Rodney Depot - located in the line between Aberdeen and Manilla
- Spirit Lake Depot – located along U.S. Highway 71/Iowa Highway 9 where the Milwaukee Road line from Spirit Lake, Iowa to Spencer, Iowa sat between 1883 and 1972. It is now used as the Dickinson County Museum.
- Tama Depot - located on the Chicago to Omaha main line
- Woodward Depot - located on the Chicago-Omaha main line

== Illinois ==
- Adeline station - located on the main line between Chicago, Illinois and Omaha, Nebraska
- Bartlett Station – located on the suburban line from Chicago, Illinois to Elgin, Illinois
- Cedar Point Depot - located on the line between Davis Junction and Oglesby
- Deerfield Station – located on the mainline from Chicago, Illinois to Milwaukee, Wisconsin
- Durand Depot - located on the line from Racine, Wisconsin to Kitteredge, Illinois
- Elgin station - located on the commuter line between Chicago and Elgin
- Freeport Depot - located on the line from Racine, Wisconsin to Kitteredge, Illinois
- Fulton Depot - located on the secondary line from Savanna, Illinois to Moline, Illinois.
- Grayslake station - located on the suburban line between Chicago, Illinois and Walworth, Wisconsin.
- Hampshire station - located on the main line between Chicago and Omaha.
- Ingleside station - located on the suburban line between Chicago, Illinois and Walworth, Wisconsin.
- Joliet station - location is on the branch of the Terre Haute Division
- Kingston station - located on the main line between Chicago and Omaha.
- Libertyville station - located on the suburban line between Chicago, Illinois and Walworth, Wisconsin.
- Mendota Station - located on the line between Davis Junction and Oglesby which was abandoned in 1980.
- Moline Depot - located on the secondary line from Savanna, Illinois to Moline, Illinois.
- National Street station - located on the suburban line from Chicago to Elgin
- Oglesby station - located on the line between Davis Junction and Oglesby
- Pingree Grove station - location on the line between Chicago and Omaha
- Rock City Depot - located on the line from Racine, Wisconsin to Kitteredge, Illinois
- Spring Grove station - located on the suburban line from Chicago, Illinois to Walworth, Wisconsin
- Techny station - located on the suburban line between Chicago, Illinois and Walworth, Wisconsin
- Wilson Road station - located on the suburban line between Chicago, Illinois and Walworth, Wisconsin.

== Indiana ==
- Azalia station - located on the Terre Haute Division
- Bedford station - located on the Terre Haute Division
- Elnora station - located on the Terre Haute Division
- Grover station - located om the Terre Haute Division
- Jasonville station - located on the Terre Haute Division
- Linton station - located on the Terre Haute Division
- Mount Olive station - located on the Terre Haute Division
- Odon station - located on the Terre Haute Division
- Rock Ledge station - located on the Terre Haute Division
- Seymour station - located on the Terre Haute Division
- Sullivan station - located on the Sullivan Branch
- Terre Haute station - located on the Terre Haute Division

== Michigan ==
- Amasa Depot
- Channing Depot
- Iron Mountain Depot
- Iron River Depot – located on a branch line from Kelso Junction (near Channing, Michigan) to the terminus at Iron River, Michigan
- Menominee Depot – the terminus of the branch line from Crivitz, Wisconsin to Menominee, Michigan
- Ontonagon Depot
- Randville Depot

== Minnesota ==
=== In Use ===
- Red Wing Station – located on the mainline from Chicago to Tacoma, Washington
- Winona Station – located on the mainline from Chicago to Tacoma, Washington

=== No Longer In Use ===
- Albert Lea Depot – located on the mainline from Milwaukee, Wisconsin to Madison, South Dakota
- Alpha Depot – located on the line from La Crosse, Wisconsin to Wessington Springs, South Dakota
- Austin Passenger Depot – located on a branch line from Madison, Wisconsin to Austin, Minnesota
- Bixby Depot – located on the line from Farmington to Ramsey
- Brownsdale Depot – located on the line from La Crosse, Wisconsin to Wessington Springs, South Dakota
- Brownsville Depot – located on the line from La Crescent to Davenport, Iowa
- Canton Depot – located on the line from Reno to Isinours
- Chaska Depot – located on the line from Farmington to Cologne
- Clinton Depot – located on a branch line from Ortonville, Minnesota to Fargo, North Dakota
- Dexter Depot – located on the line from La Crosse, Wisconsin to Wessington Springs, South Dakota
- Dresbach Depot – located on the mainline from Chicago, Illinois to Tacoma, Washington
- Faribault Depot – located on the line from Farmington to Ramsey
- Farmington Depot – located at the junction of multiple lines
- Fulda Depot – located on the line from La Crosse, Wisconsin to Wessington Springs, South Dakota
- Granada Depot – located on the line from La Crosse, Wisconsin to Wessington Springs, South Dakota
- Granite Falls Depot – located on the mainline from Chicago, Illinois to Tacoma, Washington
- Harmony Depot – located on the line from Reno to Isinours
- Hastings Depot – located on the mainline from Chicago, Illinois to Tacoma, Washington
- Huntley Depot – located on the line from La Crosse, Wisconsin to Wessington Springs, South Dakota
- Jackson Depot – located on the line from La Crosse, Wisconsin to Wessington Springs, South Dakota
- La Crescent Depot – located at the junction of the line from La Crosse, Wisconsin to Wessington Springs, South Dakota, and the line from La Crescent to Davenport, Iowa
- Le Center Depot – located on the line from Farmington to Wells
- Minneapolis Depot – located on the mainline from Chicago, Illinois to Tacoma, Washington
- Montevideo Depot – located on the mainline from Chicago, Illinois to Tacoma, Washington
- Northfield Depot – located on the line from Farmington to Ramsey
- Peterson Depot – located on the line from La Crosse, Wisconsin to Wessington Springs, South Dakota
- Prosper Depot – located on the line from Reno to Isinours
- Rapidan Depot – located on the line from Farmington to Wells
- Rushford Depot – located on the line from La Crosse, Wisconsin to Wessington Springs, South Dakota
- St. Louis Park Depot – located on the mainline from Chicago, Illinois to Tacoma, Washington
- Spring Grove Depot – located on the line from Reno to Isinours
- Vermillion Depot – located on the line from Hastings to Farmington
- Wanamingo Depot – located on the line from Faribault to Zumbrota
- Whalan Depot – located on the line from La Crosse, Wisconsin to Wessington Springs, South Dakota
- Wheaton Depot - located on a branch line from Ortonville, Minnesota to Fargo, North Dakota
- Welcome Depot – located on the line from La Crosse, Wisconsin to Wessington Springs, South Dakota
- Wells Depot and Lunchroom – a junction located on the mainline from Milwaukee, Wisconsin to Madison, South Dakota and the branch line from Wells, Minnesota to Farmington, Minnesota
- Wirock Depot – located on the line from La Crosse, Wisconsin to Wessington Springs, South Dakota

== Montana ==
- Haugan Depot – moved to private property
- Superior Depot – moved to private property
- Alberton Depot – located on the mainline from Chicago, Illinois to Tacoma, Washington
- Missoula Depot – located on the mainline from Chicago, Illinois to Tacoma, Washington
- Deer Lodge Depot - sits along mainline, now a church
- Drummond Depot - moved to Fort Missoula
- 1st & 2nd Butte Depot - located on the mainline from Chicago, Illinois to Tacoma, Washington
- Three Forks Depot - sits along mainline, currently a Chinese restaurant
- Carterville Depot - located on the main line between Chicago and Seattle/Tacoma
- East Portal Depot - located on the Chicago to Seattle main line
- Forsyth Depot - located on the main line between Chicago, illinois and Seattle, Washington
- Geraldine Depot – located on a branch line from Harlowton, Montana to Great Falls, Montana
- Great Falls Passenger Depot – located on a branch line from Harlowton, Montana to Great Falls, Montana
- Kinsey Depot - located on the Chicago-Seattle main line
- Lavina Depot - located on the main line between Chicago and Seattle
- Whitney Depot - located on the main line between Chicago and Seattle

== North Dakota ==
- Abercrombie Depot - located on the line between Fargo and Ortonville
- Bowman Depot - located on the mainline from Chicago, Illinois to Tacoma, Washington
- Brisbane Depot - located on a branch line from Mclaughlin, South Dakota to New England, North Dakota
- Bucyrus Depot - located on the mainline from Chicago, Illinois to Tacoma, Washington
- Christine Depot - located on a branch line from Ortonville, Minnesota to Fargo, North Dakota
- Elgin Depot - located on a branch line from Mclaughlin, South Dakota to New England, North Dakota
- Ellendale Depot - located on a branch line from Aberdeen, South Dakota to Edgeley, North Dakota
- Fairmount Depot - located on a branch line from Ortonville, Minnesota to Fargo, North Dakota
- Fargo Depot - located on a branch line from Ortonville, Minnesota to Fargo, North Dakota
- Gascoyne Depot - located on the mainline from Chicago, Illinois to Tacoma, Washington
- Haynes Depot - located on the mainline from Chicago, Illinois to Tacoma, Washington
- Hettinger Depot - located on the mainline from Chicago, Illinois to Tacoma, Washington
- Linton Depot - located on the line between Linton and Orient
- Marmarth Depot - located on the mainline from Chicago, Illinois to Tacoma, Washington
- New England Depot - located on the branch line between McLaughlin and New England
- Raleigh Depot - located on a branch line from Mclaughlin, South Dakota to New England, North Dakota
- Reeder Depot - located on the mainline from Chicago, Illinois to Tacoma, Washington
- Scranton Depot - located on the mainline from Chicago, Illinois to Tacoma, Washington
- Selfridge Depot - located on a branch line from Mclaughlin, South Dakota to New England, North Dakota
- Strasburg Depot - located on a branch line from Roscoe, South Dakota to Bismarck, North Dakota
- Tyler Depot - located on the line between Fargo and Ortonville
- Whiterock Depot - located on the line between Fargo and Ortonville

== South Dakota ==
- Aberdeen Depot a junction located on the mainline from Chicago, Illinois to Tacoma, Washington and the mainline from Sioux City, Iowa to Aberdeen, South Dakota, and where a branch to Edgely diverged.
- Bigstone City Depot - located on the main line between Chicago and Tacoma
- Canton Depot - located on the main line between Chicago and Rapid City
- Dupree Depot - located on the branch line to Faith
- Eagle Butte Depot - located on the branch line to Faith
- Frederick Depot - located on the Edgeley Branch
- Geddes Depot - located on the line between Platte and Yankton
- Hosmer Depot - located on the line between Linton and Orient
- Interior Depot - located on the main line between Chicago and Rapid City
- Java Depot - located on the mainline from Chicago, Illinois to Tacoma, Washington
- Kadoka Depot – located on the mainline from Milwaukee, Wisconsin to Rapid City, South Dakota
- Lake Andes Depot - located on the line between Platte and Yankton
- Madison Depot – a junction located on the mainline from Milwaukee, Wisconsin to Madison, South Dakota and on a branch line from Madison, South Dakota to Bristol, South Dakota
- Morristown Depot - located on the mainline from Chicago, Illinois to Tacoma, Washington
- Napa Depot - on the line between Platte and Yankton
- Platte Depot -Located on the line between Platte and Yankton
- Rapid City Freighthouse – located on the mainline from Milwaukee, Wisconsin to Rapid City, South Dakota
- Summit Depot - located on the Chicago to Tacoma main line
- Thunder Hawk Depot - located on the mainline from Chicago, Illinois to Tacoma, Washington
- Utica Depot - located on a branch line from Sioux City, Iowa to Mitchell, South Dakota
- Watauga Depot - located on the mainline from Chicago, Illinois to Tacoma, Washington
- Yankton Depot – located on the mainline from Sioux City, Iowa to Aberdeen, South Dakota and the line between Platte and Yankton

== Washington ==
MAINLINE

- Pine City Depot - moved to private property, used as a shed
- Warden Depot - moved
- Kittitas Depot – located on the mainline from Chicago, Illinois to Tacoma, Washington
- South Cle Elum Depot and Yard – located on the mainline from Chicago, Illinois to Tacoma, Washington
- Auburn Depot
- Black River Depot
- Cedar Falls Depot - moved to Covington as a private residence
- Dishman Depot
- Ellensburg station - also used by the Northern Pacific
- Kent Depot - moved, now a orthodontic
- Lind Depot
- Ralston Depot
- Tacoma Depot

BRANCHLINES

Metaline Falls Branch

- Newport Depot - constructed by the I&WN, now a museum.
- Cusick Depot - constructed by the I&WN, moved and is now a private residence
- Metaline Falls Depot - sits in park along the tracks

Everett Branch

- Everett Depot - now a restaurant
- Snohomish Depot - now American Legion Post 96
- Monroe Depot - Now a hair Salon

Hoquiam Branch

- Hoquiam Depot

== Wisconsin ==
=== In Use ===
- Divisions and Mileposts listed are from the September 1910 published timetable.

| Structure name | location | Image | Division | Milepost | Built | Construction/style/notes |
|---|---|---|---|---|---|---|
| Columbus Station | 43.340683°N 89.012597°W | | La Crosse | 149.9 | 1906 | Wisconsin Historical Society (WHS) property record HI3493 |
| Milwaukee Intermodal Station | 43.034327°N 87.917386°W | | La Crosse | 85.0 | 1965 | |
| La Crosse Station | 43.833408°N 91.246996°W | | La Crosse | 282.6 | 1927 | NHRP 1997 97001512 |
| Tomah Station | 43.986000°N 90.505500°W | | La Crosse | 239.8 | unk | WHS record HI79316 |

=== No Longer In Use ===
- Arena Depot – located on the mainline from Madison to Rapid City
- Avoca Depot – located on the mainline from Madison to Rapid City
- Beaver Dam Depot - located on the line from Portage to Horicon
- Black Earth Depot – located on the mainline from Chicago to Rapid City
- Blue River Depot – located on the mainline from Madison to Rapid City
- Boscobel Depot – located on the mainline from Chicago to Rapid City
- Brodhead Depot – located on the line from Janesville to Mineral Point
- Brookfield Depot – located on the mainline from Chicago to Tacoma, Washington and the commuter line between Milwaukee and Watertown
- Cedarburg Depot - located on the mainline from Milwaukee to Ontonagon
- Darlington Depot – located on the line from Janesville to Mineral Point
- Doylestown Depot – located on the mainline from Chicago to Tacoma, Washington
- Dunbarton Depot – located on the branch line from Gratiot to Shullsburg
- Duplainville Depot - located on the commuter line between Milwaukee and Watertown
- Edgerton Depot - located on the main line from Rapid City to Chicago, also located on the original Milwaukee Road line between Milwaukee and Madison
- Elm Grove Depot - located on the commuter line between Milwaukee and Watertown
- Fox Lake Depot - located on the line from Portage to Horicon
- Gifford Depot - located on the commuter line between Milwaukee and Watertown
- Gotham Depot – located on the branch line from Lone Rock to Richland Center
- Gratiot Depot – located on the line from Janesville to Mineral Point
- Green Bay Depot – located on the mainline from Chicago to Ontonagon, Michigan
- Hartland Depot – located on the mainline from Chicago to Tacoma, Washington and the commuter line between Milwaukee and Watertown
- Ixonia Depot - located on the commuter line between Milwaukee and Watertown
- Juda Depot – a demolished station located on the line from Janesville to Mineral Point
- Knowlton Depot – located on the line from New Lisbon to Star Lake
- Lakeside Depot - located on the commuter line between Milwaukee and Watertown
- Madison Depot – located on the main line from Chicago, Illinois, to Rapid City, South Dakota, the line from Portage to Madison, the line from Watertown to Madison, and the original Milwaukee Road line between Milwaukee and Madison, western terminus of the line
- Marinette Depot – located on a branch line from Crivitz to Menominee, Michigan
- Mazomanie Depot – located on the mainline from Chicago to Rapid City
- Middleton Depot - located on the line from Madison to Rapid City
- Milwaukee Everett Street Depot – demolished, was located on the mainline from Chicago to Tacoma, main hub of the Milwaukee Road with lines to Ontonagon, Oshkosh, North Lake, and Madison
- Mineral Point Depot – located on the line from Janesville to Mineral Point
- Monroe Depot – located on the line from Janesville to Mineral Point
- Monticello Depot – located on the line from Janesville to Mineral Point
- Nagawicka Depot - located on the commuter line between Milwaukee and Watertown
- Nashota Depot – located on the mainline from Chicago to Tacoma, Washington and the commuter line between Milwaukee and Watertown
- New Glarus Depot - located on the branch line from New Glarus to Brodhead
- New Lisbon Depot – located on the mainline from Chicago to Tacoma, Washington
- Oakdale Depot – located on the mainline from Chicago to Tacoma, Washington
- Oconomowoc Depot – located on the mainline from Chicago to Seattle and Tacoma and the commuter line from Milwaukee to Watertown
- Okauchee Depot - located on the commuter line between Milwaukee and Watertown
- Orfordville Depot – located on the line from Janesville to Mineral Point
- Pewaukee Depot - located on the commuter line between Milwaukee and Watertown
- Prairie du Chien Depot – located on the mainline from Chicago to Rapid City
- Prairie du Sac Depot – located on the branch line from Mazomanie to Prairie du Sac
- Richland Center Depot - located on a branch line from Lone Rock to Richland Center
- South Wayne Depot – located on the line from Janesville to Mineral Point
- Sturtevant Depot - located on the mainline from Chicago to Tacoma, Washington, relocated to park, new Amtrak depot
- Tamarack Depot - a demolished station located on the Chicago to Seattle main line
- Viroqua Depot - located on a branch line from Sparta to Viroqua
- Walworth Depot - located on the main line from Chicago, Illinois to Rapid City, South Dakota, and the commuter line between Chicago and Walworth
- Watertown Depot - located on the commuter line between Milwaukee and Watertown
- Wauwatosa station - location is on the commuter line between Milwaukee and Watertown
- Wausau Depot – located on the line from New Lisbon to Star Lake
- Woodman Depot – located on the mainline from Madison to Rapid City
- Wyocena Depot - located on the Chicago to Seattle main line.
- Zenda Depot - located on the Chicago to Rapid City main line and the commuter line between Chicago and Walworth
