= Chicago, Milwaukee, St. Paul and Pacific Railroad Depot =

Chicago, Milwaukee, St. Paul and Pacific Railroad Depot may refer to:

- Chicago, Milwaukee, St. Paul and Pacific Railroad Depot (Albert Lea, Minnesota), listed on the National Register of Historic Places in Freeborn County, Minnesota
- Chicago, Milwaukee, St. Paul and Pacific Railroad Depot (Farmington, Minnesota), listed on the National Register of Historic Places in Dakota County, Minnesota
- Chicago, Milwaukee, St. Paul and Pacific Railroad Depot (Aberdeen, South Dakota), listed on the NRHP in Brown County, South Dakota

== See also ==
- Chicago, St. Paul, Minneapolis, and Omaha Depot (disambiguation)
