= Jefferson station =

Jefferson Station may refer to:

- Jefferson City station in Jefferson City, Missouri
- Jefferson Street (BMT Canarsie Line)
- Jefferson station (Jacksonville), in Jacksonville, Florida, United States
- Jefferson Station (SEPTA), in Philadelphia, Pennsylvania, United States
- Jefferson Fire Station, located in Jefferson, Wisconsin
- Jefferson station (Iowa), located in Jefferson, Iowa
