= Milwaukee Road Depot (Iron Mountain, Michigan) =

Former Milwaukee Road train station in Iron Mountain, Michigan

Iron Mountain
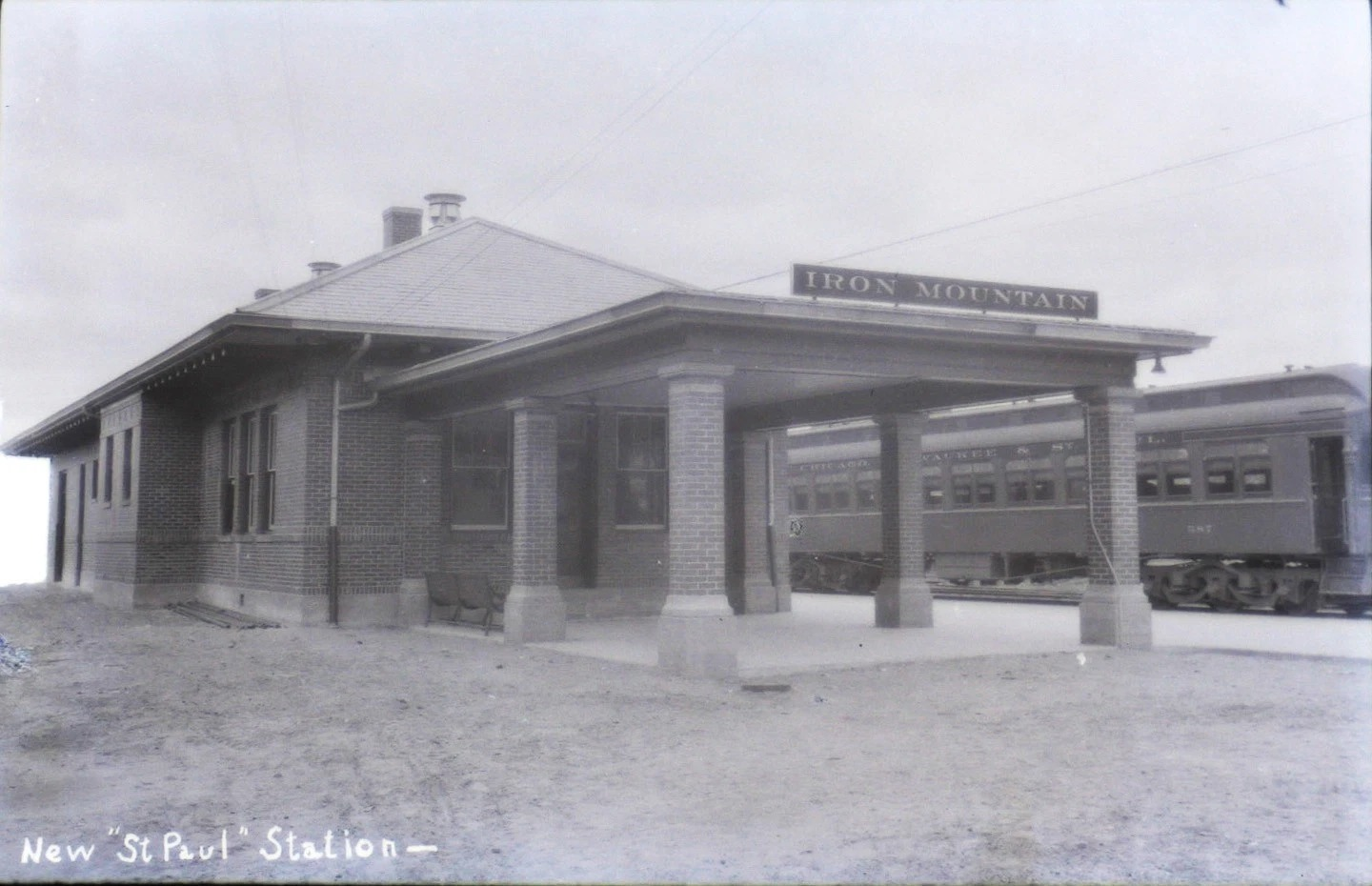
- The Iron Mountain Milwaukee Road depot in 1915.

General information
- Location: 101 East B Street; Iron Mountain, Michigan; United States
- Owner: Escanaba & Lake Superior Railroad
- Line: Superior Division
- Platforms: 1 side platform
- Tracks: 1
- Connections: Bus transport

Construction
- Parking: yes
- Architectural style: modified Neoclassical

Other information
- Website: elsrr.com

History
- Opened: 1910
- Closed: March 7, 1968
- Former names: Wisconsin & Michigan Railway
- Original company: Milwaukee Road

Former services
Preceding station	Milwaukee Road	Following station
Antoine toward Ontonagon	Ontonagon – Milwaukee	East Kingsford toward Milwaukee
Location

The Iron Mountain depot (Note: In North America, the terms "depot" and "station" have historically been interchangeable for such structures.) was built by the Chicago, Milwaukee, St. Paul and Pacific Railroad—better known as the Milwaukee Road at milepost 208 in 1910. The current station has one of the last standing semaphore signals in Michigan.

The original depot (burned June 17, 1987) was moved to south of East C Street to face East D Street and repurposed as a freight house.

Located at 101 East B Street in Iron Mountain, Michigan, the depot is part of the Iron Mountain Central Historic District. The 130 foot long brick depot has a modified Neoclassical design and is rectangular in shape with a slate roof. The depot has a 20x30 foot pavilion on the B Street end that connected to the general (non-smoking) waiting room. The station agent's office is located in the middle of the building, along with two restrooms. A baggage room is located on the south end.

Soon after this area was settled, the news of mineral riches brought the railroads. Milwaukee Road predecessor Milwaukee and Northern Railway was the first railroad to reach Iron Mountain on November 20, 1887.

The Wisconsin & Michigan Railway reached the town in 1898. The Wisconsin & Michigan Railway used the train station at Iron Mountain jointly with the Milwaukee Road.

== Passenger services endings ==
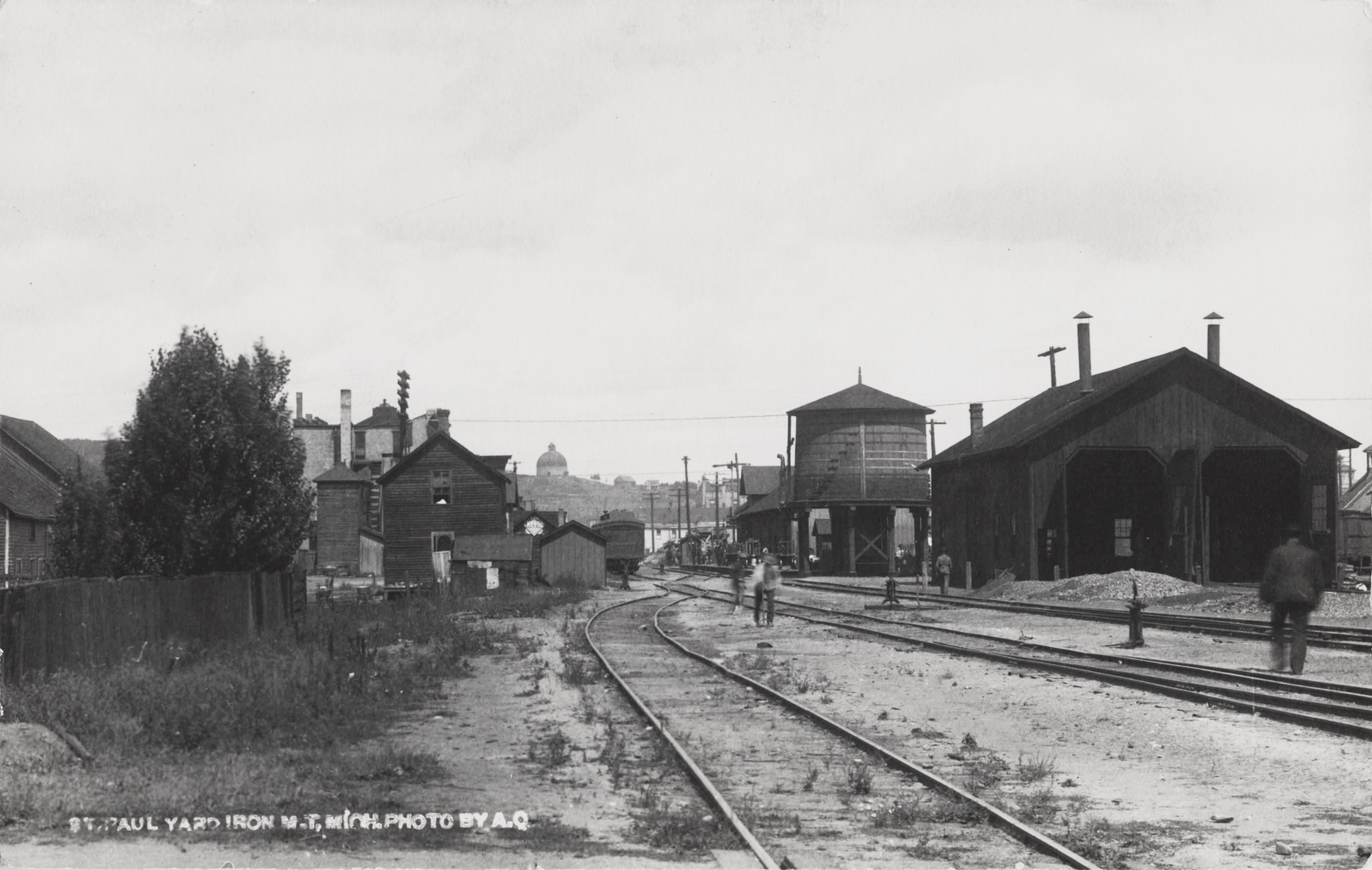
Iron Mountain engine house, water tower, passenger station 1918.

Automobile usage growth in the late 1950s caused the rail passenger usage to diminish greatly. Currently, there is no direct rail passenger service to Iron Mountain, Michigan.

- The Wisconsin & Michigan Railway after its abandonment was approved in 1938 ended all service on its entire line.
- The Milwaukee Road discontinued the Chippewa passenger train altogether on February 2, 1960.
- By the late 1960s with few riders remaining, the Milwaukee Road's Copper Country Limited made its last runs on March 7, 1968.
- The C&NW also discontinued its service to its Iron Mountain station (320 S. Stephenson Ave.) in 1969.

Passenger service to Green Bay, Wisconsin and cities beyond (Milwaukee/Chicago) forever ended on March 7th, 1968. There is an Amtrak Thruway Bus Service that connects to Marinette, Wisconsin.

== Nearby Milwaukee Road stations ==
- Amberg, Wi
- Amasa, Mi
- Channing, Mi
- Crivitz, Wi
- Iron River, Mi
- Marinette, Wi
- Menominee, Mi
- Ontonagon, Mi
- Pembine, Wi destroyed by fire in 2019.

== See also ==
- Milwaukee Road
- Milwaukee Road Depot
- Chicago & Northwestern
- Stiles Junction, Wisconsin
- Wisconsin & Michigan Railway
