= Chicago, Milwaukee and St. Paul Depot =

Chicago, Milwaukee and St. Paul Depot may refer to:

- Chicago, Milwaukee and St. Paul Depot (Montevideo, Minnesota), listed on the National Register of Historic Places in Chippewa County, Minnesota
- Chicago, Milwaukee and St. Paul Depot (Yankton, South Dakota), listed on the National Register of Historic Places in Yankton County, South Dakota
- Chicago, Milwaukee and St. Paul Railway Company Passenger Depot, listed on the National Register of Historic Places in Dodge County, Wisconsin
