= Hornick station =

Hornick
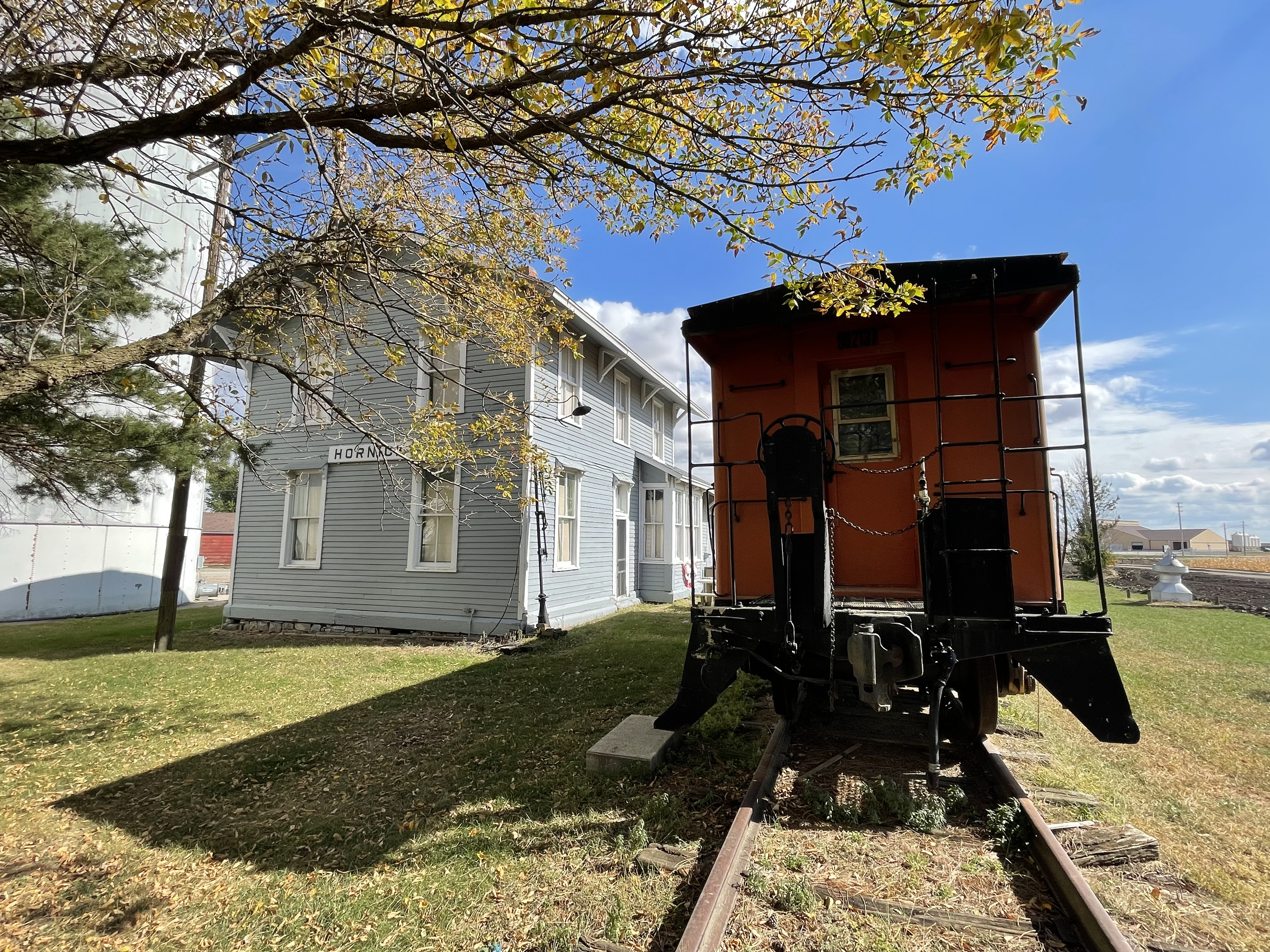
- Hornick station (2022)

General information
- Location: 201 Main Street, Hornick, Iowa 51026
- System: Former Milwaukee Road passenger rail station

Services
Preceding station	Milwaukee Road	Following station
Owego toward Aberdeen	Aberdeen – Manilla	Grant Center toward Manilla
- Chicago, Milwaukee, St. Paul & Pacific Combination Depot-Hornick
- U.S. National Register of Historic Places
- Location within Iowa Location within the United States
- Location: Main St. south of Railway St. Hornick, Iowa
- Coordinates: 42°13′42.8″N 96°05′51.3″W
- Area: less than one acre
- Built: 1886-1887
- Architect: CMSP&P Railroad
- Architectural style: Late Victorian
- MPS: Advent & Development of Railroads in Iowa MPS
- NRHP reference No.: 90001309
- Added to NRHP: September 6, 1990
Location

The Chicago, Milwaukee, St. Paul & Pacific Combination Depot-Hornick, also known as the Hornick Depot, is a historic building located in Hornick, Iowa, United States. The town was patted by the Chicago, Milwaukee, St. Paul & Pacific Railroad's land company when the railroad created a branch line from Manilla, Iowa to Sioux City. Completed in 1887, the railroad built this two-story frame structure to serve as its passenger and freight depot. It is one of six such depots that remain in Iowa, and the best preserved. These buildings were built from a standard design used by the railroad. The two-story stations included living quarters for the station manager because the towns had yet to develop when the depot was built. This was an island depot, with freight loaded on the north side and passengers boarded on the south. Decorative elements on this depot include lathe-turned wooden finials, angled wooden brackets, and bracketed door and window hoods. Passenger service ended in the 1950s, and grain was loaded here until 1980 when the Milwaukee Road abandoned the Sioux City branch line. The building was listed on the National Register of Historic Places in 1990. It has been converted into a local history museum.
