= Utica station (South Dakota) =

Utica

General information
- Location: 28562 431st Ave, Menno, South Dakota 57045
- Coordinates: 43°14′48″N 97°34′36″W
- System: Former Milwaukee Road passenger rail station

History
- Opened: 1890s

Services
Preceding station	Milwaukee Road	Following station
Lesterville toward Aberdeen	Aberdeen – Manilla	Yankton toward Manilla
- Utica Depot
- U.S. National Register of Historic Places
- Location within South Dakota
- Location: 28562 431st Ave; Menno, South Dakota
- Coordinates: 43°14′48″N 97°34′36″W
- Built: 1890s
- NRHP reference No.: 80003755
- Added to NRHP: April 16, 1980
Location

The Utica Depot was built by the Chicago, Milwaukee and St. Paul Railway ("Milwaukee Road") in the 1890s. It is a rectangular one story structure with wide overhanging bracketed eaves. It is a standardized depot design constructed by railroads in many rural locations. The depot has belled siding and an irregular stone foundation; a bay window and the main door are located on the front façade.

The depot was listed in the National Register of Historic Places because of its architecture and also because of its association with the development of Utica and Yankton County. Since closing, the depot was moved from Utica to a museum in Menno.
