= Chicago, St. Paul, Minneapolis, and Omaha Depot =

Chicago, St. Paul, Minneapolis, and Omaha Depot may refer to:

- Chicago, St. Paul, Minneapolis, and Omaha Depot (St. James, Minnesota), listed on the National Register of Historic Places in Watonwan County, Minnesota
- Chicago, St. Paul, Minneapolis, and Omaha Depot (Westbrook, Minnesota), listed on the National Register of Historic Places in Cottonwood County, Minnesota

== See also ==
- Chicago, Milwaukee, St. Paul and Pacific Railroad Depot (disambiguation)
