= Iron River station (Michigan) =

Railway station in Iron River, Michigan, United States

Iron River
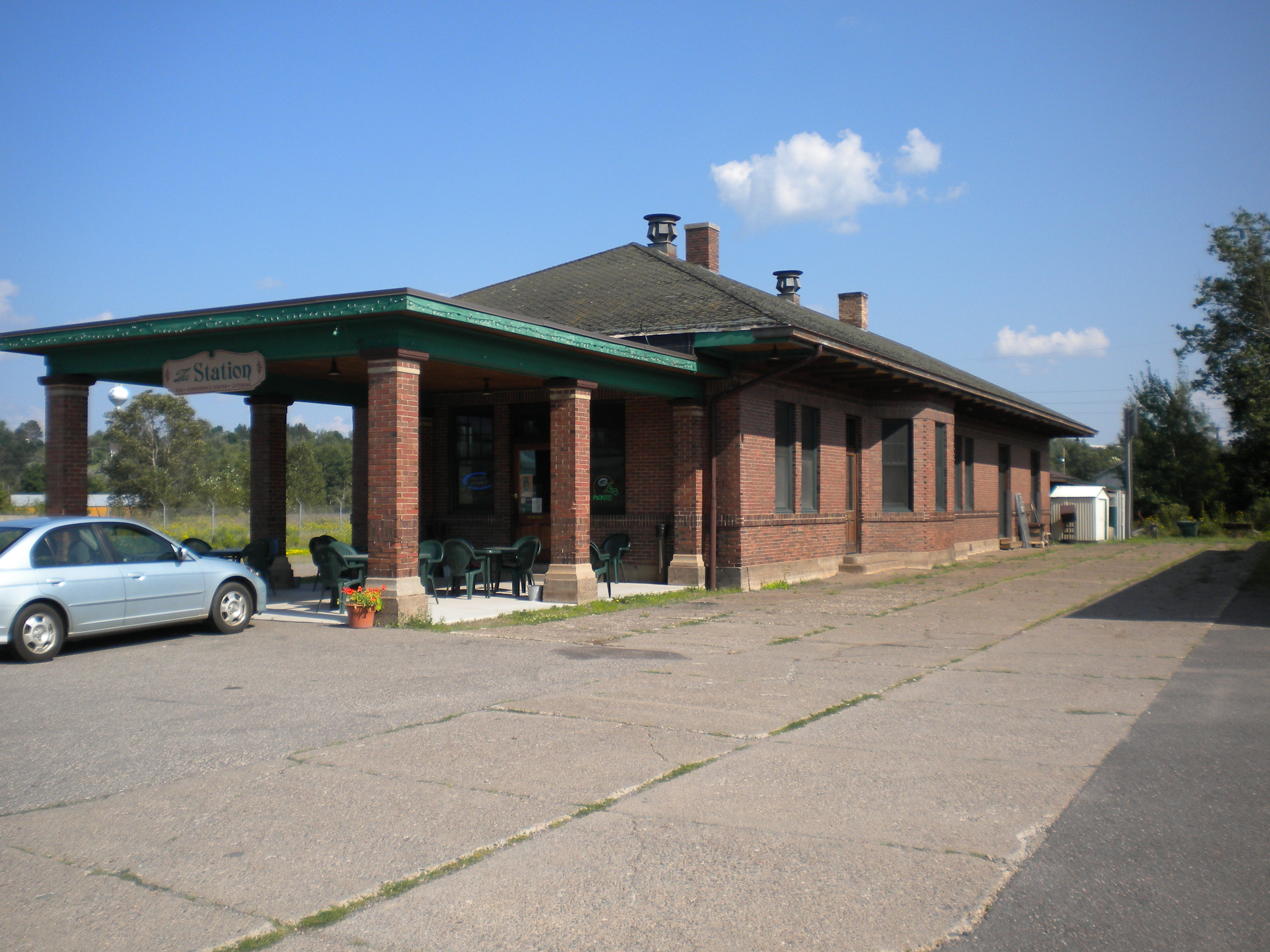
- The Iron River depot in 2010, when a restaurant was located in it

General information
- Location: 50 North Fourth Avenue (M-189), Iron River, Michigan 49935
- System: Former Milwaukee Road passenger rail station

History
- Opened: 1913
- Closed: 1945

Services
Preceding station	Milwaukee Road	Following station
Terminus	Iron River – Channing	Stambaugh toward Channing
- Chicago, Milwaukee and Saint Paul Railway Iron River Depot
- U.S. National Register of Historic Places
- Location within Michigan
- Location: 50 N. 4th Avenue; Iron River, Michigan
- Coordinates: 46°05′17″N 88°38′32″W
- Built: 1914
- Architectural style: Neoclassical
- MPS: Iron County MRA
- NRHP reference No.: 07000479
- Added to NRHP: May 30, 2007
Location

The Iron River depot was built by the Chicago, Milwaukee, St. Paul and Pacific Railroad—better known as the Milwaukee Road—in 1913. Located in Iron River, Michigan, the brick depot has a modified Neoclassical design and is rectangular in shape. The depot has a covered porch on one end that connected to the waiting room. The station agent's office was located in the middle of the building, and a freight room was on the other end.

The CNW railroad came to the Upper Peninsula of Michigan to serve the local iron mines and timber industry, and built a branch line that terminated in Iron River in 1913. Passenger service connected to the main line at Channing, Michigan until it ended in 1945; the railroad provided bus service between Sagola, Michigan and Iron River until 1956. The railroad ceased bus service in 1956.

The depot was sold to a local produce company for use as a warehouse. The depot was subsequently sold to an equipment company. In 1993, the depot was sold again. The new owners rehabilitated the depot and turned it into a restaurant and bakery. The new owners also bought two old ex-Long Island Rail Road passenger coaches and added them to the depot as part of a railroad-themed restaurant, but has since closed after the death of one owner. The depot was listed on the National Register of Historic Places because of its architecture and also because of its association with the development of Iron River. It is also significant as the last remaining railway station in Iron River.

== Nearby Milwaukee Road stations ==
- Amasa, Mi
- Channing, Mi
- Iron Mountain, Mi
- Ontonagon, Mi
- Pembine, Wi destroyed by fire in 2019.

== See also ==
- Milwaukee Road
- Milwaukee Road Depot
- Chicago & Northwestern
