= Hornick, Iowa =

- City
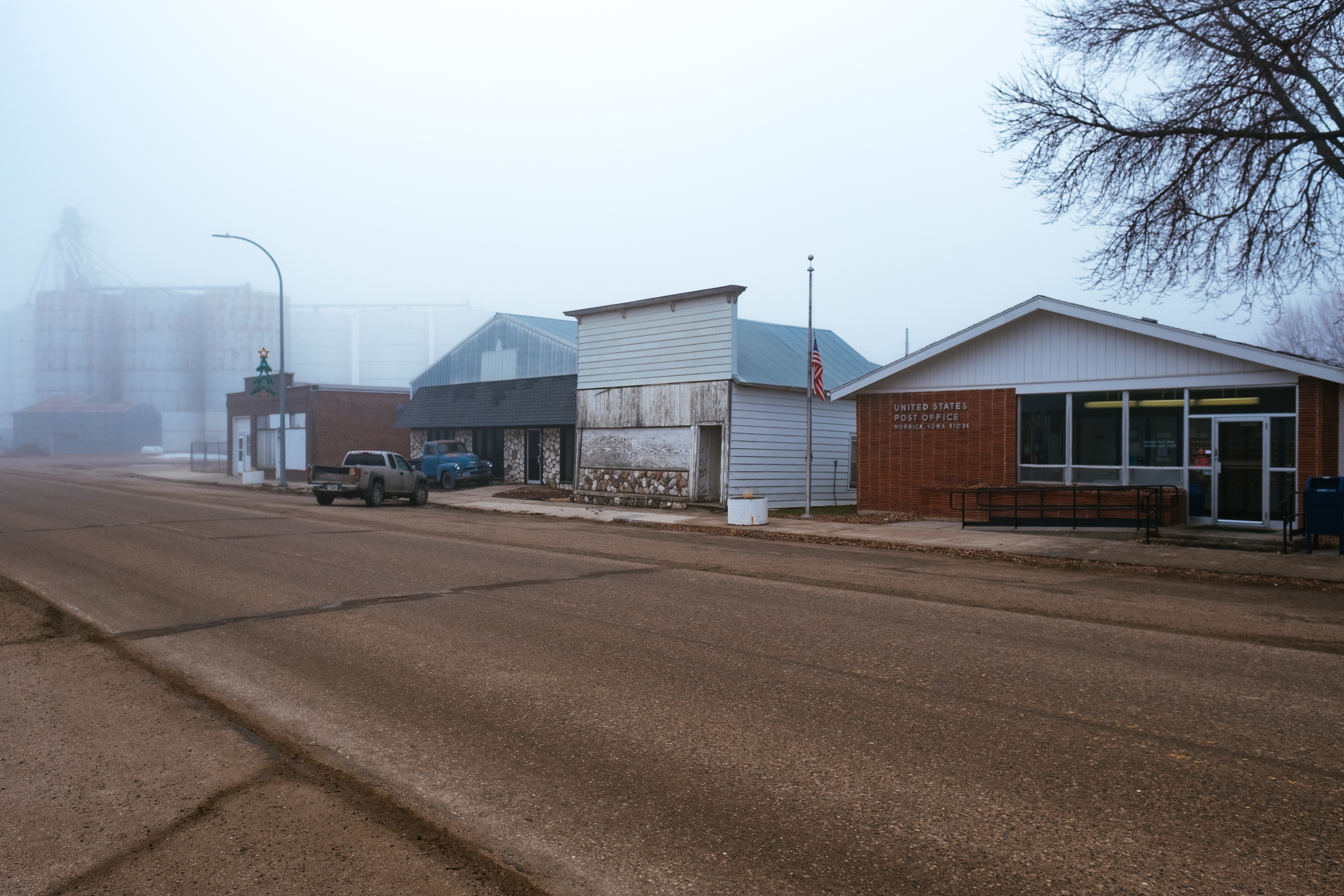
- Main Street looking southwest from 4th Street

- Location of Hornick, Iowa
- Coordinates: 42°13′50″N 96°05′50″W
- Country: USA
- State: Iowa
- County: Woodbury
- Incorporated: June 23, 1896

Area
  - Total: 0.25 sq mi (0.66 km^{2})
  - Land: 0.25 sq mi (0.65 km^{2})
  - Water: 0.0039 sq mi (0.01 km^{2})
- Elevation: 1,066 ft (325 m)

Population (2020)
  - Total: 255
  - Density: 1,016.8/sq mi (392.57/km^{2})
- Time zone: UTC-6 (Central (CST))
  - Summer (DST): UTC-5 (CDT)
- ZIP code: 51026
- Area code: 712
- FIPS code: 19-37200
- GNIS feature ID: 2394422
- Website: www.hornickiowa.com

Hornick is a city in Woodbury County, Iowa, United States. It is part of the Sioux City, IA–NE–SD metropolitan statistical area. The population was 255 at the time of the 2020 census.

== Geography ==
According to the United States Census Bureau, the city has a total area of 0.26 square miles (0.67 km^{2}), of which 0.25 square miles (0.65 km^{2}) is land and 0.01 square mile (0.03 km^{2}) is water. The town is located on the floodplain of the Missouri River, near the edge of the Loess Hills, adjacent to the old (meandered) channel of the West Fork of the Little Sioux River.

== History ==
Hornick was impacted the 2019 floods. The town was under 2 feet of water. Funding has been allocated for the construction of a berm, similar to the temporary berm which prevented flooding in 1996.

Hornick formerly had passenger train service provided by the Milwaukee Road. Today, Hornick station is listed on the NRHP.

== Demographics ==
Historical populations
Year	Pop.	±%
1900	284	—
1910	245	−13.7%
1920	296	+20.8%
1930	309	+4.4%
1940	291	−5.8%
1950	310	+6.5%
1960	275	−11.3%
1970	250	−9.1%
1980	239	−4.4%
1990	222	−7.1%
2000	253	+14.0%
2010	225	−11.1%
2020	255	+13.3%
Source:"U.S. Census website". United States Census Bureau. and Iowa Data Center; Source: U.S. Decennial Census

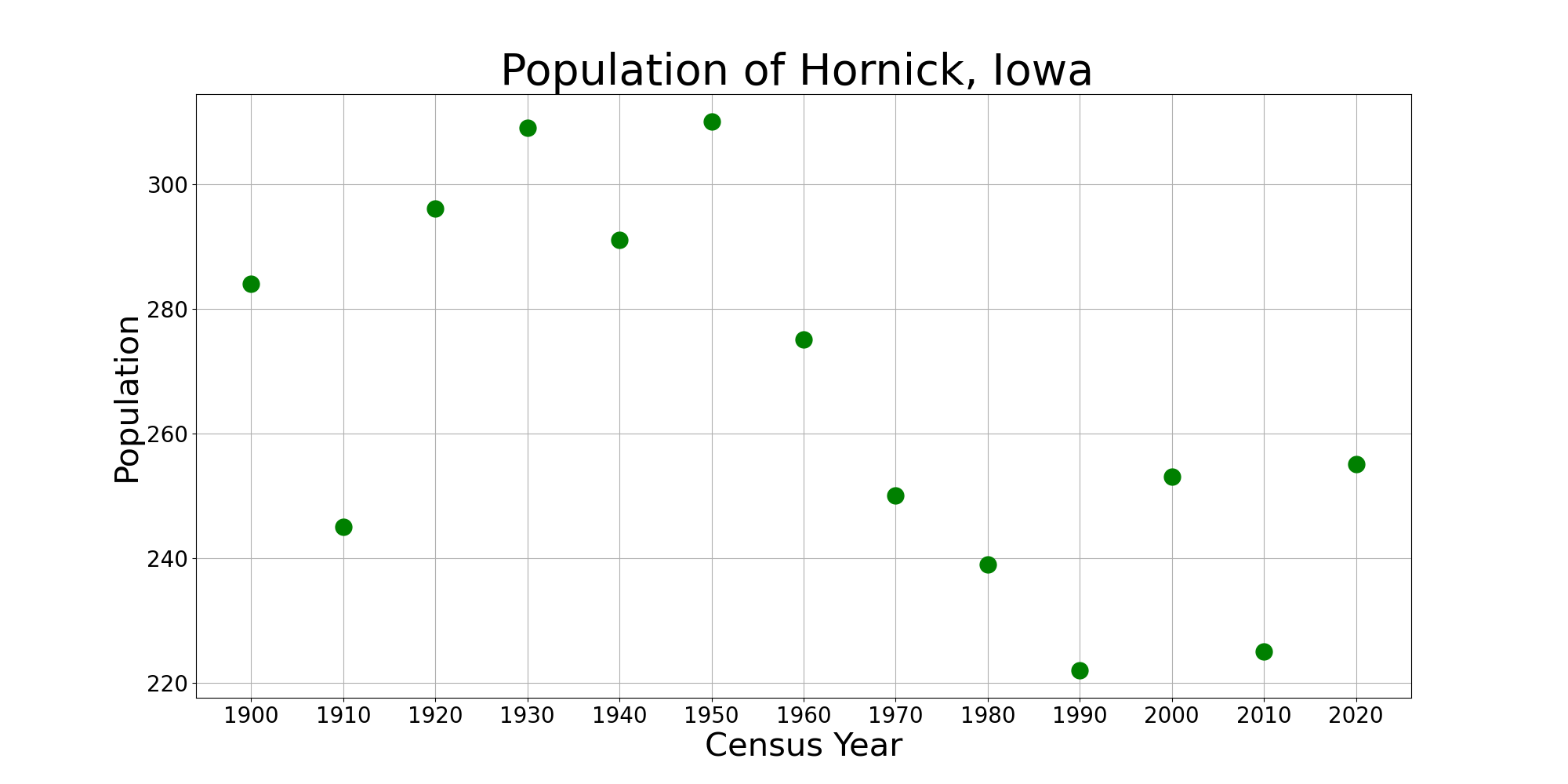
The population of Hornick, Iowa from US census data

=== 2020 census ===
As of the census of 2020, there were 255 people, 94 households, and 70 families residing in the city. The population density was 1,016.8 inhabitants per square mile (392.6/km^{2}). There were 105 housing units at an average density of 418.7 per square mile (161.6/km^{2}). The racial makeup of the city was 96.9% White, 0.8% Black or African American, 0.0% Native American, 0.4% Asian, 0.0% Pacific Islander, 0.0% from other races and 2.0% from two or more races. Hispanic or Latino persons of any race comprised 1.2% of the population.

Of the 94 households, 40.4% of which had children under the age of 18 living with them, 50.0% were married couples living together, 12.8% were cohabitating couples, 21.3% had a female householder with no spouse or partner present and 16.0% had a male householder with no spouse or partner present. 25.5% of all households were non-families. 16.0% of all households were made up of individuals, 7.4% had someone living alone who was 65 years old or older.

The median age in the city was 35.4 years. 31.4% of the residents were under the age of 20; 3.5% were between the ages of 20 and 24; 29.0% were from 25 and 44; 22.7% were from 45 and 64; and 13.3% were 65 years of age or older. The gender makeup of the city was 51.4% male and 48.6% female.

=== 2010 census ===
As of the census of 2010, there were 225 people, 102 households, and 65 families living in the city. The population density was 900.0 inhabitants per square mile (347.5/km^{2}). There were 113 housing units at an average density of 452.0 per square mile (174.5/km^{2}). The racial makeup of the city was 98.2% White, 0.4% African American, 0.4% Asian, 0.4% from other races, and 0.4% from two or more races. Hispanic or Latino of any race were 0.9% of the population.

There were 102 households, of which 33.3% had children under the age of 18 living with them, 47.1% were married couples living together, 12.7% had a female householder with no husband present, 3.9% had a male householder with no wife present, and 36.3% were non-families. 35.3% of all households were made up of individuals, and 13.7% had someone living alone who was 65 years of age or older. The average household size was 2.21 and the average family size was 2.82.

The median age in the city was 38.3 years. 26.7% of residents were under the age of 18; 5.2% were between the ages of 18 and 24; 24.8% were from 25 to 44; 25.3% were from 45 to 64; and 17.8% were 65 years of age or older. The gender makeup of the city was 48.0% male and 52.0% female.

=== 2000 census ===
As of the census of 2000, there were 253 people, 101 households, and 68 families living in the city. The population density was 984.4 inhabitants per square mile (380.1/km^{2}). There were 113 housing units at an average density of 439.7 per square mile (169.8/km^{2}). The racial makeup of the city was 98.42% White, 0.79% African American, and 0.79% from two or more races.

There were 101 households, out of which 34.7% had children under the age of 18 living with them, 56.4% were married couples living together, 8.9% had a female householder with no husband present, and 31.7% were non-families. 27.7% of all households were made up of individuals, and 17.8% had someone living alone who was 65 years of age or older. The average household size was 2.50 and the average family size was 3.10.

Age spread: 24.1% under the age of 18, 8.3% from 18 to 24, 30.0% from 25 to 44, 21.3% from 45 to 64, and 16.2% who were 65 years of age or older. The median age was 38 years. For every 100 females, there were 90.2 males. For every 100 females age 18 and over, there were 88.2 males.

The median income for a household in the city was $28,958, and the median income for a family was $37,083. Males had a median income of $26,750 versus $20,781 for females. The per capita income for the city was $15,246. About 8.5% of families and 8.9% of the population were below the poverty line, including 8.9% of those under the age of eighteen and 10.9% of those 65 or over.
