= Rushford station =

Train station

Rushford
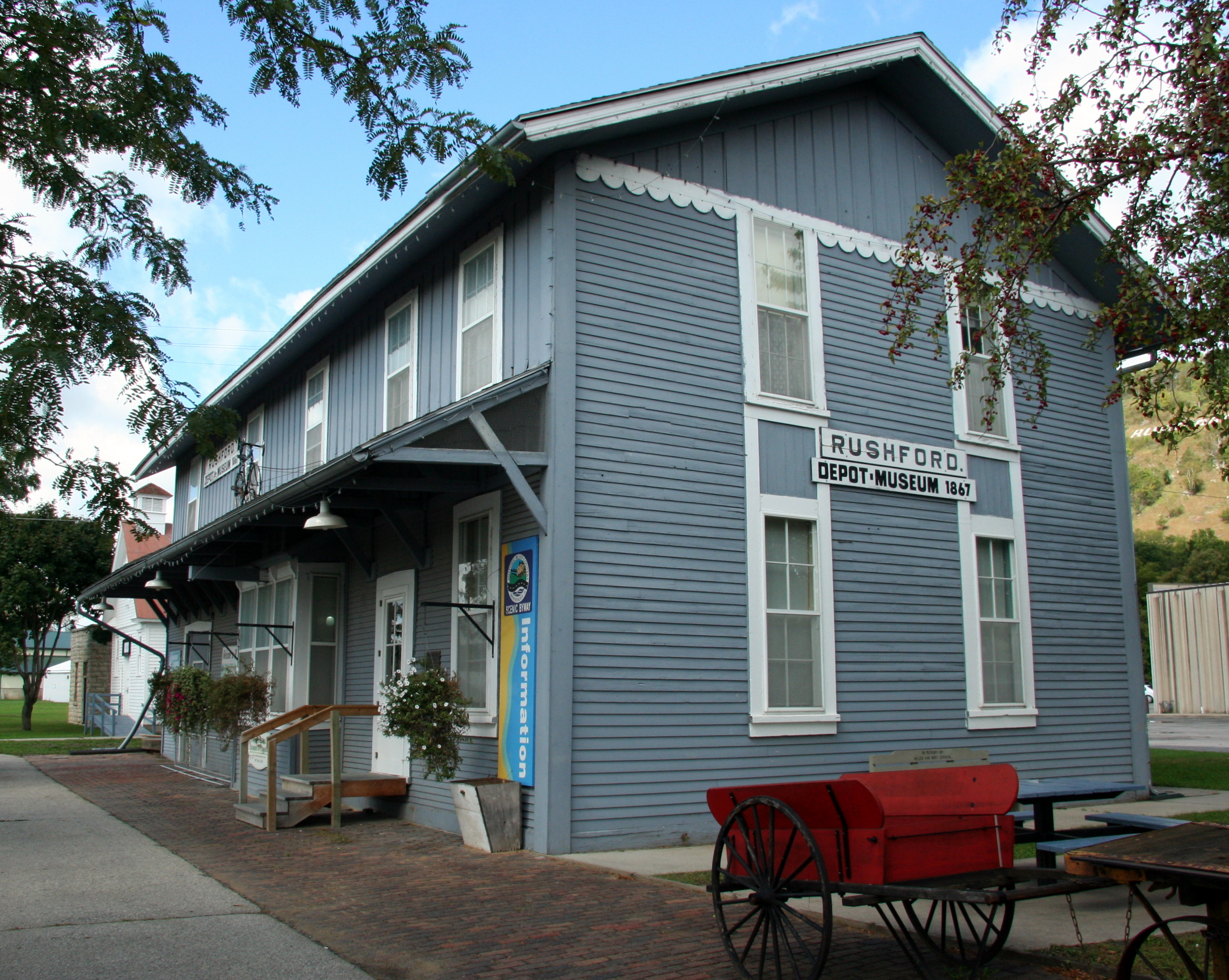
- The Rushford, MN Depot in 2001

General information
- Location: 401 S. Elm St.
- Coordinates: 43°48′25″N 91°45′19″W
- System: Former Milwaukee Road passenger rail station

History
- Opened: 1867
- Closed: 1960

Services
Preceding station	Milwaukee Road	Following station
Peterson toward Wessington Springs	Wessington Springs – La Crosse	Perkins toward La Crosse
- Southern Minnesota Depot
- U.S. National Register of Historic Places
- Location within Minnesota Location within the United States
- Location: Rushford, Minnesota
- Coordinates: 43°48′25″N 91°45′19″W
- Built: 1867
- Architect: Southern Minnesota Railroad
- NRHP reference No.: 86001363
- Added to NRHP: June 20, 1986
Location

The Southern Minnesota Depot in Rushford, Minnesota, United States, is a historic railway station. It was added to the National Register of Historic Places in 1986.

Constructed in 1867 as a one-story building. The depot’s second level was added in 1868 as a residence for the depot agent’s family. The Rushford depot is thought to be the last two-story depot still standing in its original location on the Southern Minnesota Railroad line. The Southern Minnesota Railroad ran from La Crosse, Wisconsin, to Austin, Minnesota, prior to being bought out by the Milwaukee Railroad. The last passenger train stopped in Rushford in 1975 and the last freight train left town in 1980.

When the railroad closed the line in 1980, the depot was used as storage for a local business.

The depot was purchased by the Rushford Area Historical Society (RAHS) for $10,000 in 1987. Restoration efforts began immediately through grant writing, fundraising, and volunteer help.

In the early years the depot housed the local telegraph and post office and was a popular gathering place and communications center. RAHS restored the building to be a visitor’s center, museum, and genealogy research center. The museum showcases artifacts and stories from area people, organizations, and businesses.

The railway bed adjacent to the depot became the Root River State Bike Trail in 1988 and the visitors' center provides local and regional travel information, restrooms, and a drinking fountain for those using the trail.
