= Yankton station =

Railway station in Yankton, South Dakota, United States

Yankton
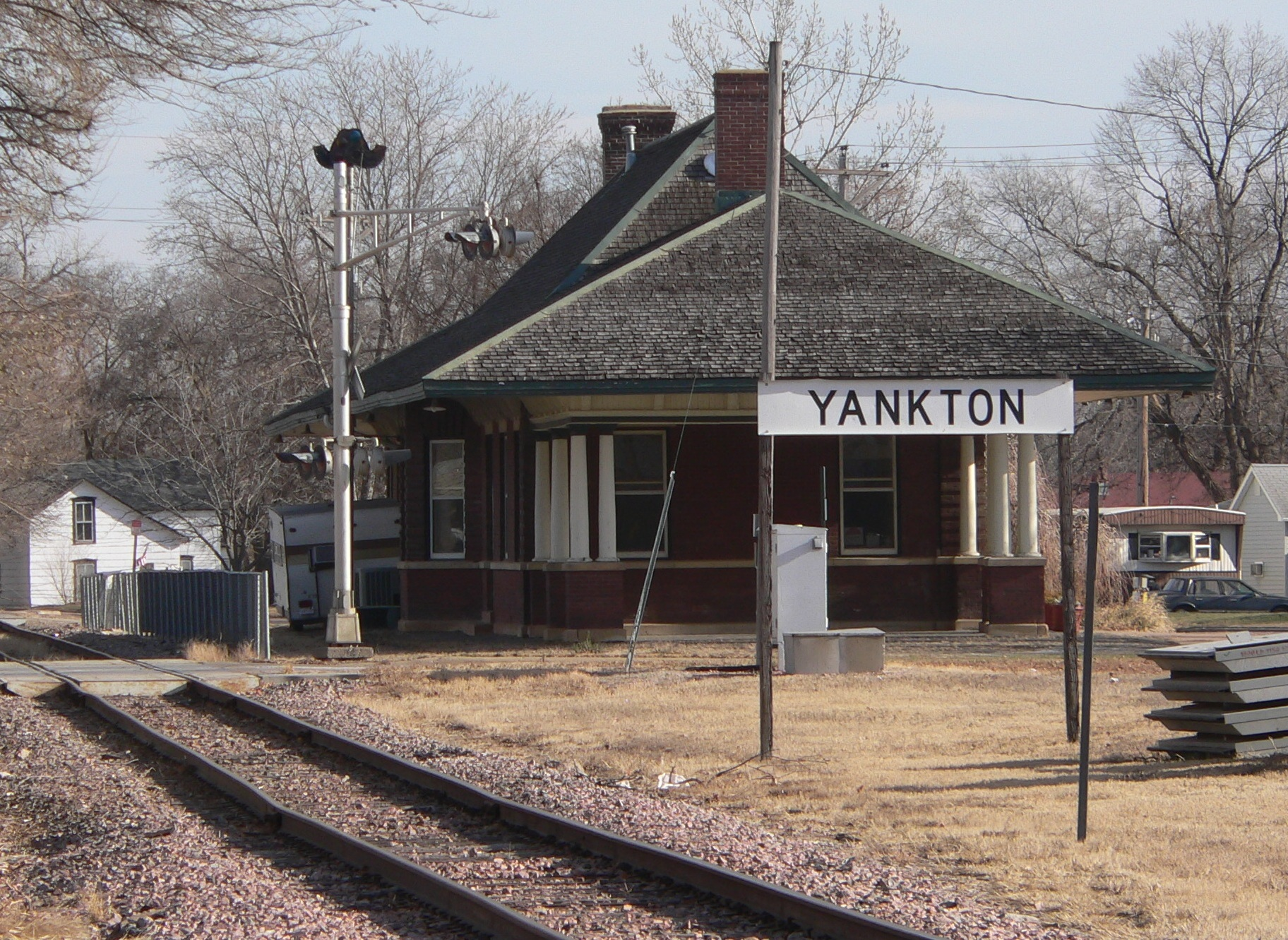

General information
- Location: 800 Douglas Avenue, Yankton, South Dakota 57078
- System: Former Milwaukee Road passenger rail station

History
- Rebuilt: 1905

Services
Preceding station	Milwaukee Road	Following station
Utica toward Aberdeen	Aberdeen – Manilla	Fullerville toward Manilla
Napa toward Platte	Platte – Yankton	Terminus
- Chicago, Milwaukee and St. Paul Depot
- U.S. National Register of Historic Places
- Location within South Dakota
- Location: 800 Douglas Ave. (corner of 8th St. and Douglas Ave.); Yankton, South Dakota
- Coordinates: 42°52′36″N 97°23′29″W
- Built: 1905
- NRHP reference No.: 82003947
- Added to NRHP: March 5, 1982
Location

The Chicago, Milwaukee and St. Paul Depot in Yankton, South Dakota was built in 1905 by the Chicago, Milwaukee, St. Paul and Pacific Railroad (otherwise known as The Milwaukee Road).

== History ==
Prior to the 1870s, Yankton was served by steamboats along the Missouri River. As service declined, railroads took over to serve the communities in South Dakota. In the late 1870s, the Dakota Southern Railroad entered Yankton. Shortly afterward, the Dakota Southern was bought by The Milwaukee Road. The Milwaukee Road then expanded westward toward Rapid City, South Dakota and the Black Hills.

In 1905, The Milwaukee Road built its depot in Yankton. Using a common design, the depot is rectangular in shape and single story. It is built of brick with wood and stone trim. There is a covered area at one end of the depot that leads to the waiting room. A baggage room is located at the other end and the station agent's office is located between the two.

As railroad passenger service declined after the 1940s, the depot was sold. The Milwaukee Road itself went bankrupt in the 1980s, and the tracks adjacent to the depot were sold to BNSF Railway predecessor Burlington Northern. At the time of nomination to the National Register of Historic Places, the depot was used as offices for a local cable television company. In 2008, the depot houses the offices of an architectural firm.

The depot was listed in the National Register because of its architecture and also because of it association with the commercial development of Yankton and the development of railroads in South Dakota.
