= Jefferson Fire Station =

- U.S. National Register of Historic Places
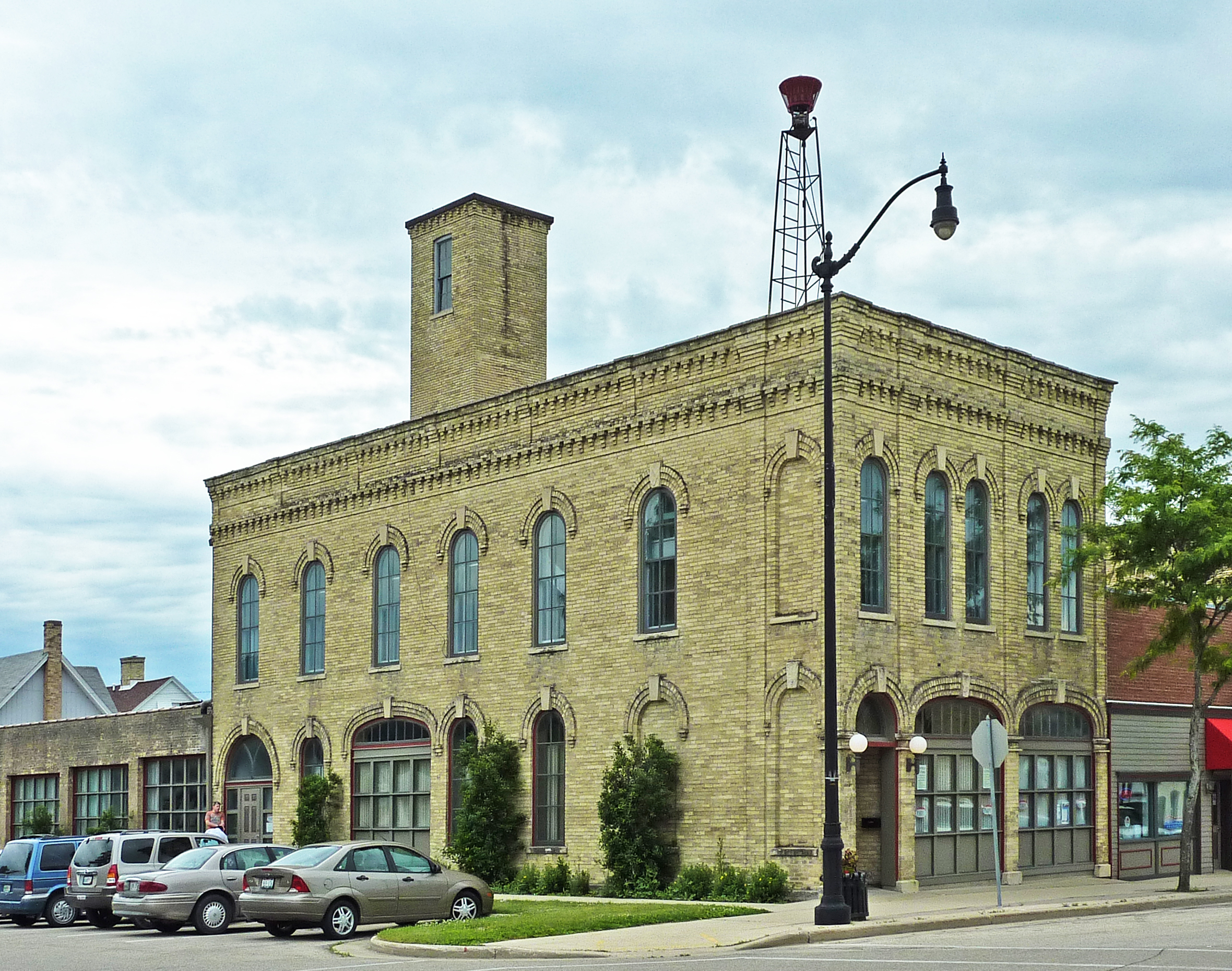
- Jefferson Fire Station
- Location: 146 E. Milwaukee St., Jefferson, Wisconsin
- Coordinates: 43°00′15″N 88°48′22″W
- Area: less than one acre
- Built: 1871; 1876 (addition)
- Built by: Adam Spangler
- Architect: Alexander Kirkland
- Architectural style: Italianate
- NRHP reference No.: 84000695
- Added to NRHP: December 6, 1984

The Jefferson Fire Station is a historic firehouse at 146 E. Milwaukee Street in Jefferson, Wisconsin.

== History ==
The City of Jefferson built the fire station in 1871 for its new volunteer fire department, which formed the same year. Architect Alexander Kirkland, who practiced in Scotland before moving to Jefferson in 1868, designed the two-story Italianate building. The station has a yellow brick exterior and features arch windows with keystones, four pilasters on the north face, and a corbelled cornice. In addition to its primary function, the fire station served as a community center, as the department hosted social gatherings and many of Jefferson's prominent residents volunteered for the department. The building also housed Jefferson's municipal offices from 1878 to 1965.

The fire department used the fire station until 1983. The building has since been converted from its original use and is occupied by a number of businesses. It was listed on the National Register of Historic Places in 1984 and on the State Register of Historic Places in 1989.
