= Menominee station =

Milwaukee Road train station in Menominee, Michigan

Menominee
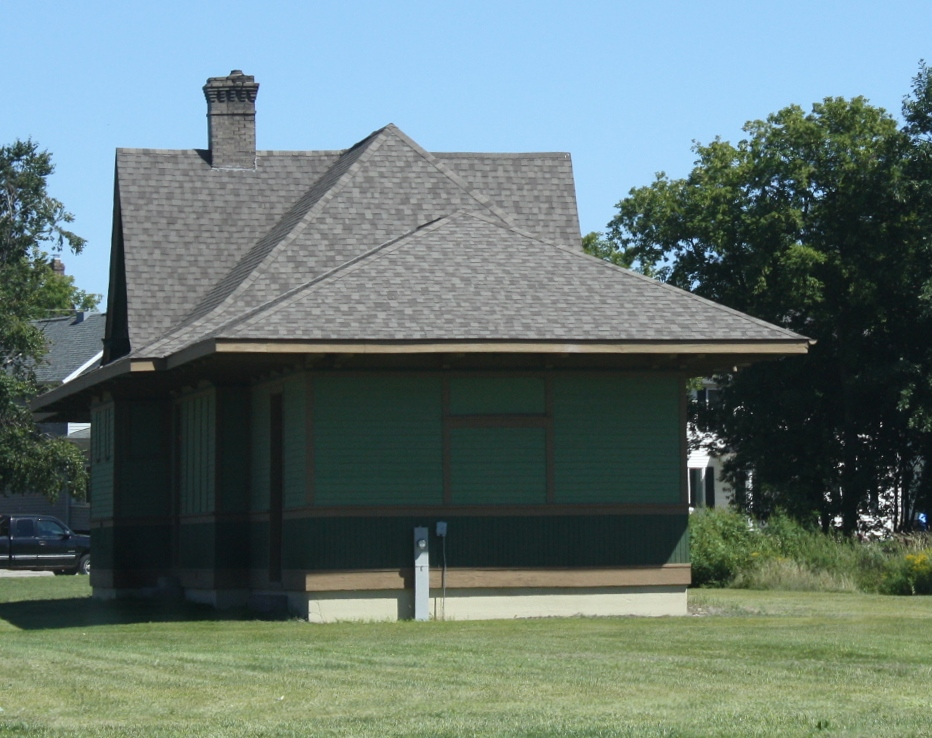
- Menominee station in August 2011.

General information
- Location: 219 West Fourth Avenue, Menominee, Michigan 49858
- System: Former Milwaukee Road passenger rail station
- Line: Superior Division
- Platforms: 1 side platform

Construction
- Parking: yes

Other information
- Website: www.menomineedepot.com

History
- Opened: December 7, 1903
- Closed: 1938

Services
Preceding station	Milwaukee Road	Following station
Marinette toward Crivitz	Crivitz – Menominee	Terminus
- Chicago, Milwaukee, St. Paul and Pacific Railroad Station
- U.S. National Register of Historic Places
- Michigan State Historic Site
- Location within Michigan
- Location: 219 West Fourth Ave., Menominee, Michigan
- Coordinates: 45°6′3″N 87°36′9″W
- Area: 1.1 acres (0.45 ha)
- Built: 1903
- Architect: James U. Nettenstrom
- NRHP reference No.: 82002852

Significant dates
- Added to NRHP: April 22, 1982
- Designated MSHS: November 11, 1977
Location

The Chicago, Milwaukee, St. Paul and Pacific Railroad Station, also known as the Milwaukee Road Depot, is a railroad depot located at 219 West Fourth Avenue in Menominee, Michigan. It was listed on the National Register of Historic Places in 1982 and designated a Michigan State Historic Site in 1977.

== History ==
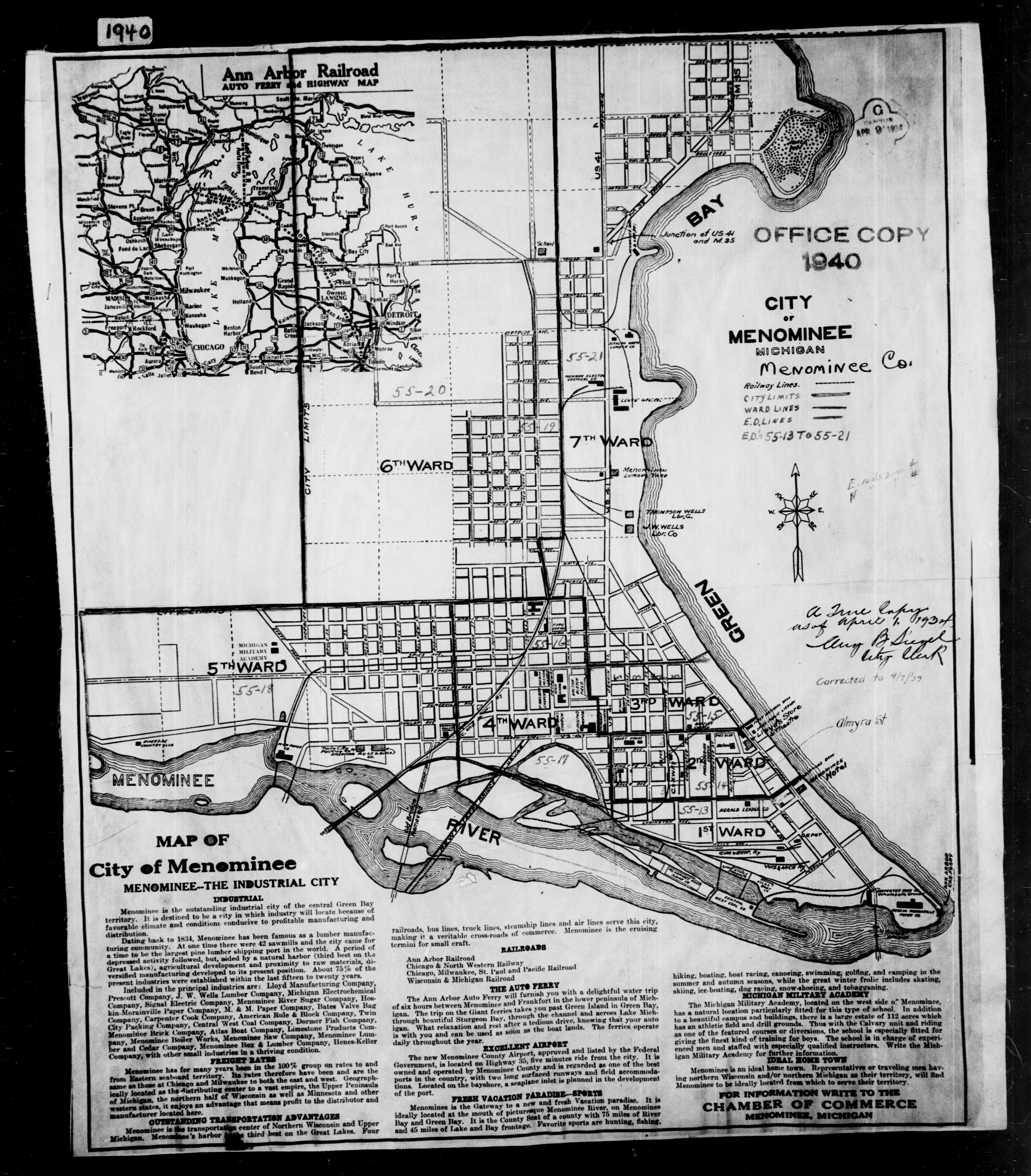
Menominee, Michigan census map showing 4 railroads in the 1st Ward

A rail service was originally extended to Menominee to serve the logging industry. However, as the 19th century drew to a close, the logging in the area was slumping. To offset the decrease in business, the Chicago, Milwaukee, St. Paul and Pacific Railroad (Milwaukee Road) turned to passenger service.

In 1903, they constructed a new passenger depot in Menominee from a design by architect James U. Nettenstrom; the design is substantially similar to the nearby depot at Marinette, Wisconsin, constructed at the same time.

The railroad ran three daily passenger trains between Menominee and Crivitz, Wisconsin from 1903 until 1914. From 1915 until 1927, the rail line offered both passenger and freight service, but the venture ultimately failed. The new station, first occupied on December 7, 1903 was used as a freight stop until 1938, after which it was shuttered.

The Wisconsin and Michigan Railroad discontinued their Menominee freight service in 1938 after which their portion of the 3 railroads in town was removed.

In 1979, a private partnership, Depot Enterprises, purchased the building. As of 2012, the building is for sale.

== Description ==
The current Chicago, Milwaukee, St. Paul, and Pacific Depot, built in 1903 is a single story frame structure clad with clapboards and vertical tongue and groove siding and resting on a poured concrete foundation. The main section of the depot is covered with a gabled roof, having wide overhanging eaves supported by metal brackets. A covered waiting platform topped with a hip roof and lined with Doric columns is set at one end of the building. The interior has approximately 2000 square feet of floor space, with an additional 500 square feet under the covered waiting platform. The platform and tracks are currently below grade.

The original depot here was built in 1885 was destroyed in a fire October 24, 1903 and was to be repurposed as the freight house. This depot was located on 3rd Street. Measuring at 20' by 80' it had a hipped roof, wide overhanging eaves and a covered passenger waiting platform at the end of the station.
