= Edgerton station =

Edgerton
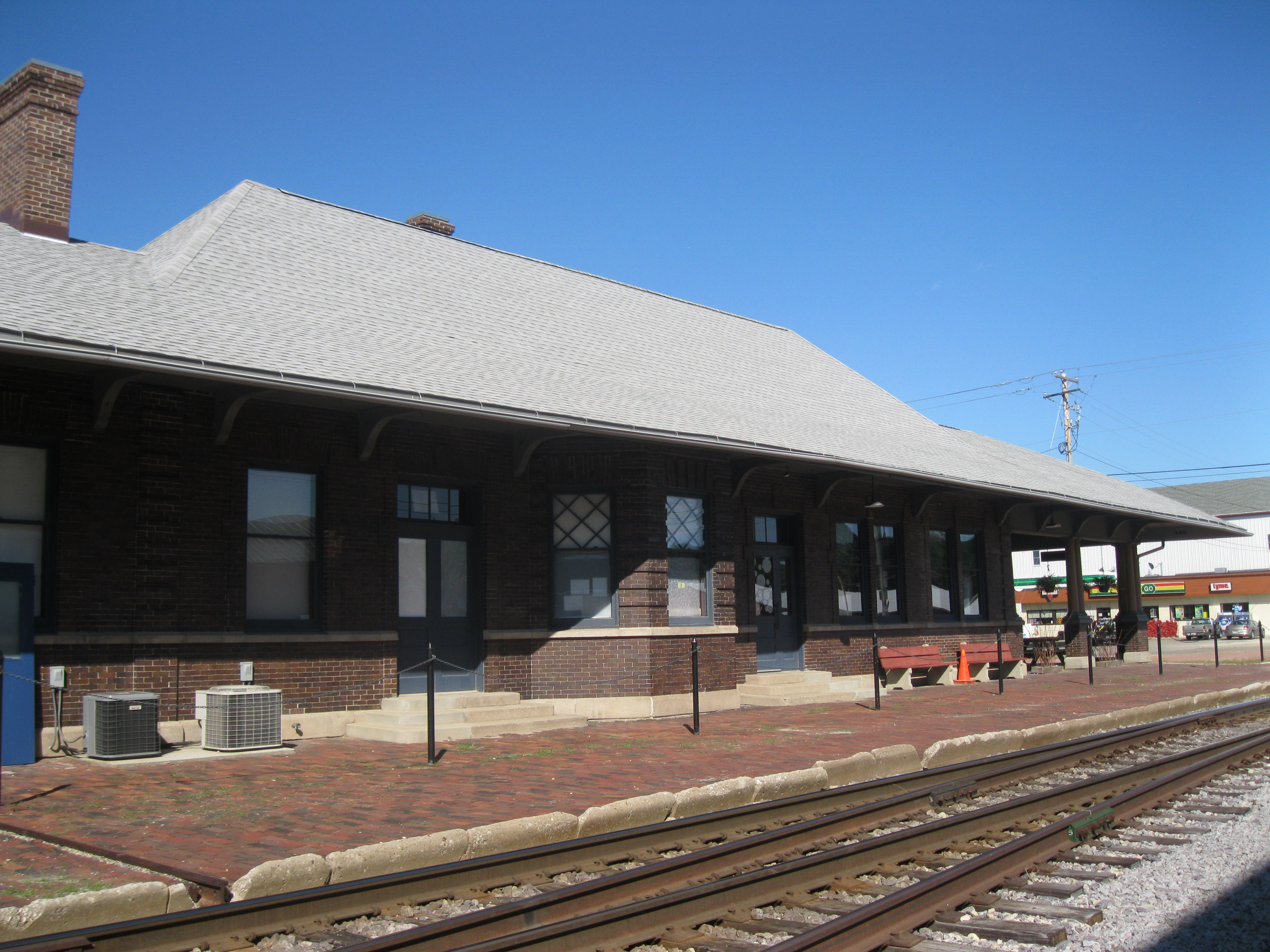
- South side of the station, facing the railroad tracks

General information
- Location: 20 South Main Street, Edgerton, Wisconsin 53534
- System: Former Milwaukee Road passenger rail station

History
- Opened: 1853
- Closed: 1971
- Rebuilt: 1906–1907

Services
| Preceding station | Milwaukee Road | Following station |
|---|---|---|
| Stoughton toward Madison | Madison – Milwaukee via Waukesha | Milton toward Milwaukee |
| Stoughton toward Madison | Madison – Rondout | Milton Junction toward Rondout |
- Edgerton Depot
- U.S. National Register of Historic Places
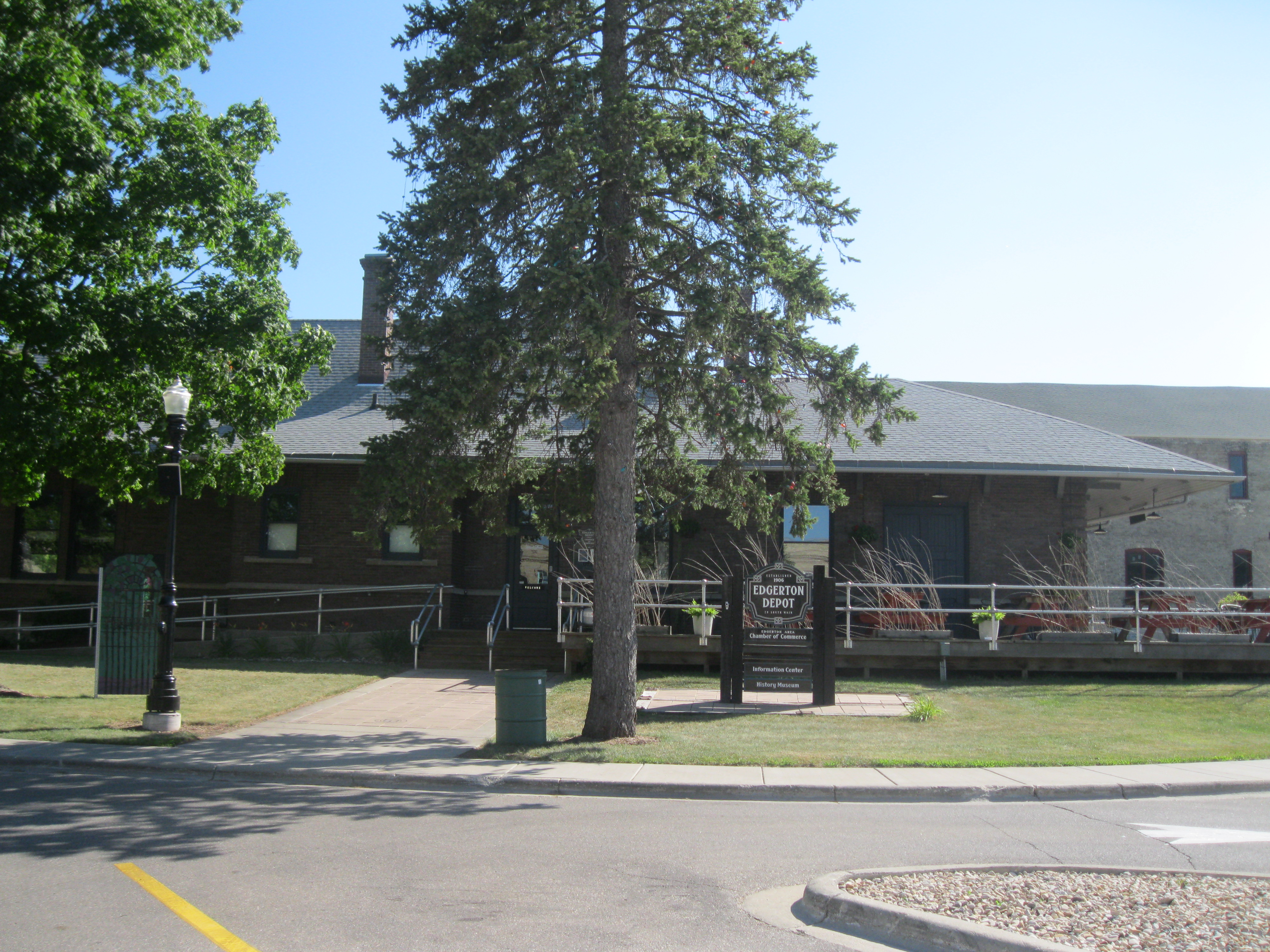
- Northern side of the station

- Location within Wisconsin Location within the United States
- Coordinates: 42°50′0″N 89°4′13″W
- Area: less than one acre
- Built: 1906-07
- Architects: Loweth, C.F.
- NRHP reference No.: 98000283
- Added to NRHP: April 13, 1998
Location

The Edgerton Depot is a historic railway station located at 20 South Main Street in Edgerton, Wisconsin. The station was built in 1906 to 1907 to serve the Chicago, Milwaukee, St. Paul and Pacific Railroad, also known as the Milwaukee Road; it replaced the city's original depot, which opened in 1853 with the railroad. Railroad engineer C.F. Loweth designed the station, which features a hipped roof, bracketed overhanging eaves, a red brick exterior with stone trim, and decorative brick quoins and keystones. The station was critical to the city's tobacco industry, which attracted customers from as far away as Europe; the railroad both shipped tobacco to larger cities and brought business agents to the city's firms. Passenger trains to the station, which were used both by residents and the aforementioned businessmen, primarily served routes to Milwaukee and Chicago. The station was remodeled in 1939, though rail travel in Edgerton had already begun to decline by this point; it fell even more significantly in the 1950s and 1960s, and the station closed in 1971.

The station was added to the National Register of Historic Places on April 13, 1998.
