= Grafton station (Iowa) =

Historic train station in America

Grafton
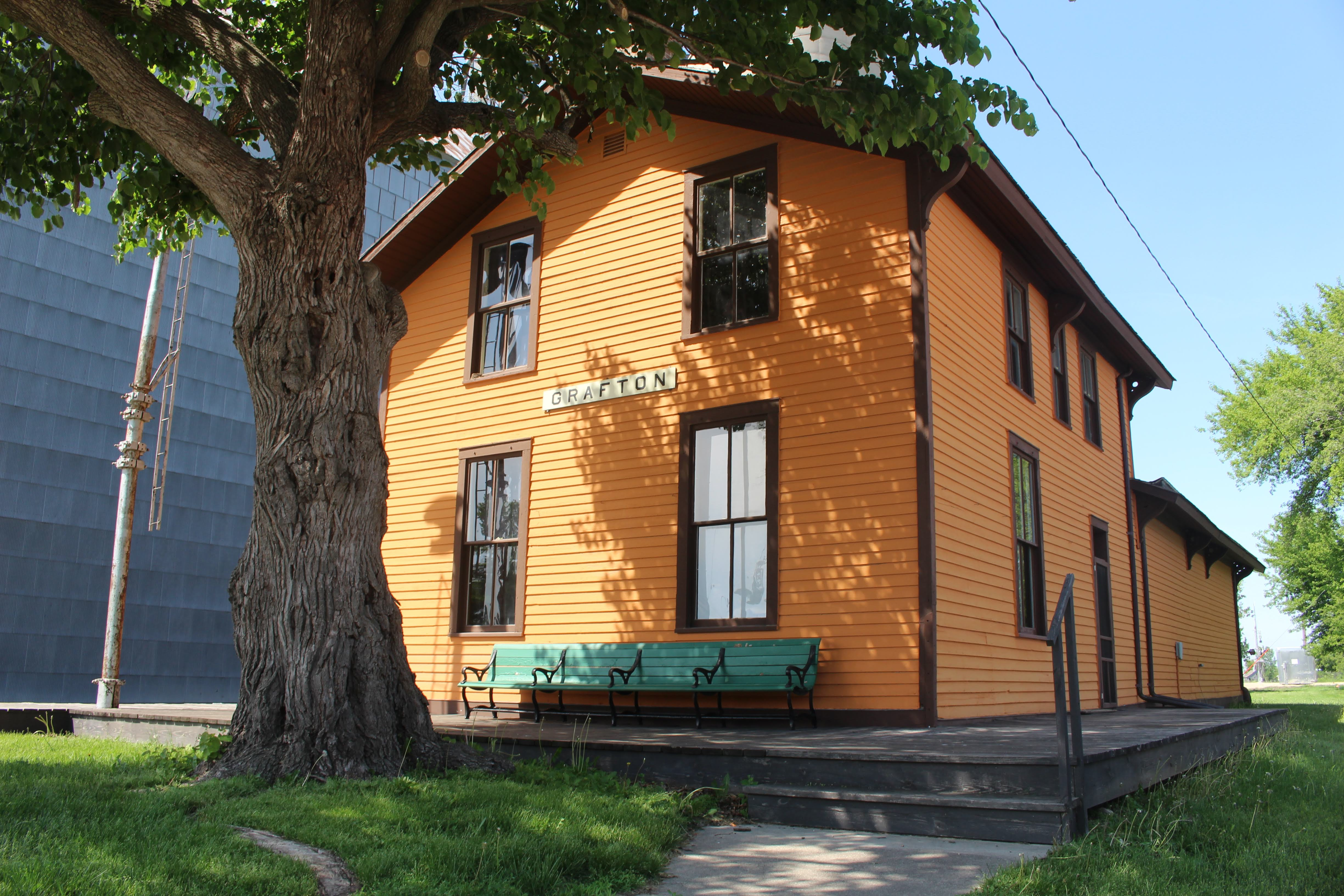
- The Milwaukee Road depot in Grafton in May, 2018

General information
- Location: 303 3rd Street, Grafton, Iowa 50440
- System: Former Milwaukee Road passenger rail station

History
- Opened: 1879

Services
Preceding station	Milwaukee Road	Following station
Carpenter toward Austin	Austin – Mason City	Plymouth toward Mason City
- Chicago, Milwaukee, and St. Paul Railroad-Grafton Station
- U.S. National Register of Historic Places
- Location within Iowa Location within the United States
- Location: Grafton, Iowa
- Coordinates: 43°19′49″N 93°04′14″W
- Area: less than one acre
- Built: 1879
- NRHP reference No.: 76000815
- Added to NRHP: June 23, 1976
Location

The Chicago, Milwaukee, and St. Paul Railroad-Grafton Station, also known as Grafton Depot, is a historic structure located in Grafton, Iowa, United States. The town of Grafton was surveyed and platted by the Chicago, Milwaukee and St. Paul Railroad in 1878, and the depot was completed by the railroad the following year. The railroad was important to the economic life of the town as it was the main source for receiving consumer goods and selling agricultural products, which was the area's primary industry. The depot closed in October 1974, one of the last small town depots to close in Iowa. It was listed on the National Register of Historic Places in 1976. The former depot was refurbished and it now houses a local history museum.

The depot is a two-story, frame structure built on a brick foundation. There is a single story wing off of the back of the building. It is capped with a gable roof, with wooden brackets under the eaves. The first floor of the main block housed the waiting room and ticket office, while the second floor was the living space for the agent. The back wing housed the freight room. The first floor remains now as it was when it was a depot, with local artifacts housed on the second floor.
