= Milwaukee Road Freight House =

- U.S. National Register of Historic Places
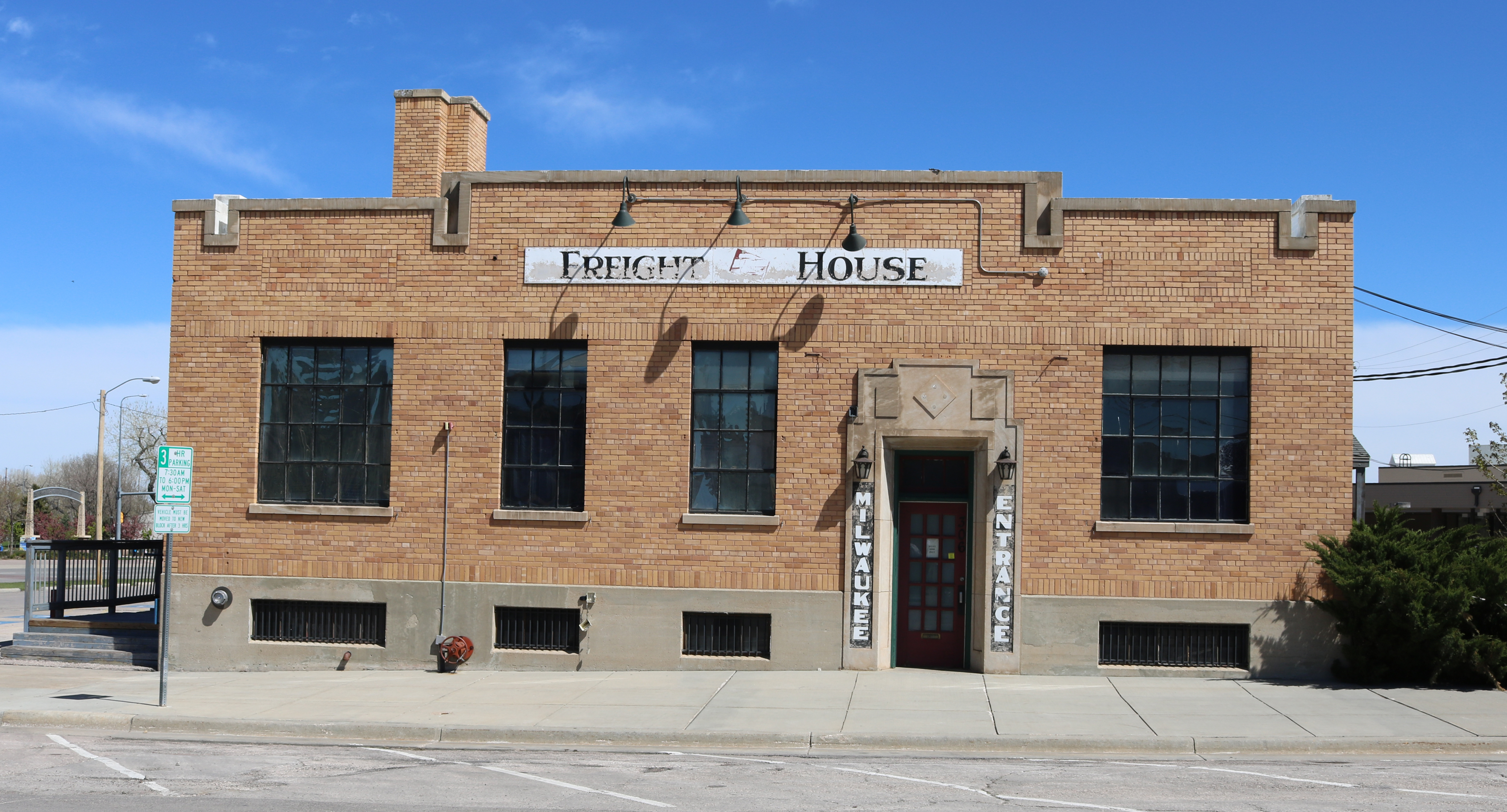
- The property in 2017.

- Location within South Dakota Location within the United States
- Location: Seventh and Omaha Sts. Rapid City, South Dakota
- Coordinates: 44°04′59″N 103°13′39″W
- Built: 1923
- NRHP reference No.: 88003200
- Added to NRHP: January 19, 1989

The Milwaukee Road Freight House in Rapid City, South Dakota, United States, was built by the Chicago, Milwaukee, St. Paul and Pacific Railroad (also known as The Milwaukee Road) in 1923 to store and ship freight. The building is single storey, rectangular, and constructed of brick. Offices were placed at one end with warehouse space occupying the rest of the building. Large freight doors and bays are along each side. The circa 1915 depot is located east of the freight house.

The Milwaukee Road built its line from eastern South Dakota to Rapid City in 1906–07. With the increase of tourists in the late 1910s, the railroad built the freight house. It was built of brick. The design was a modern one, based on other early 20th century commercial buildings. When The Milwaukee Road went bankrupt and abandoned its lines in South Dakota in 1980, it sold the freight house to local businesses for use as offices.

The freight house was placed on the National Register of Historic Places because of its association with The Milwaukee Road and railroad development in South Dakota.
