= Marinette station =

Former railway station in Marinette, Wisconsin, U.S.

Marinette
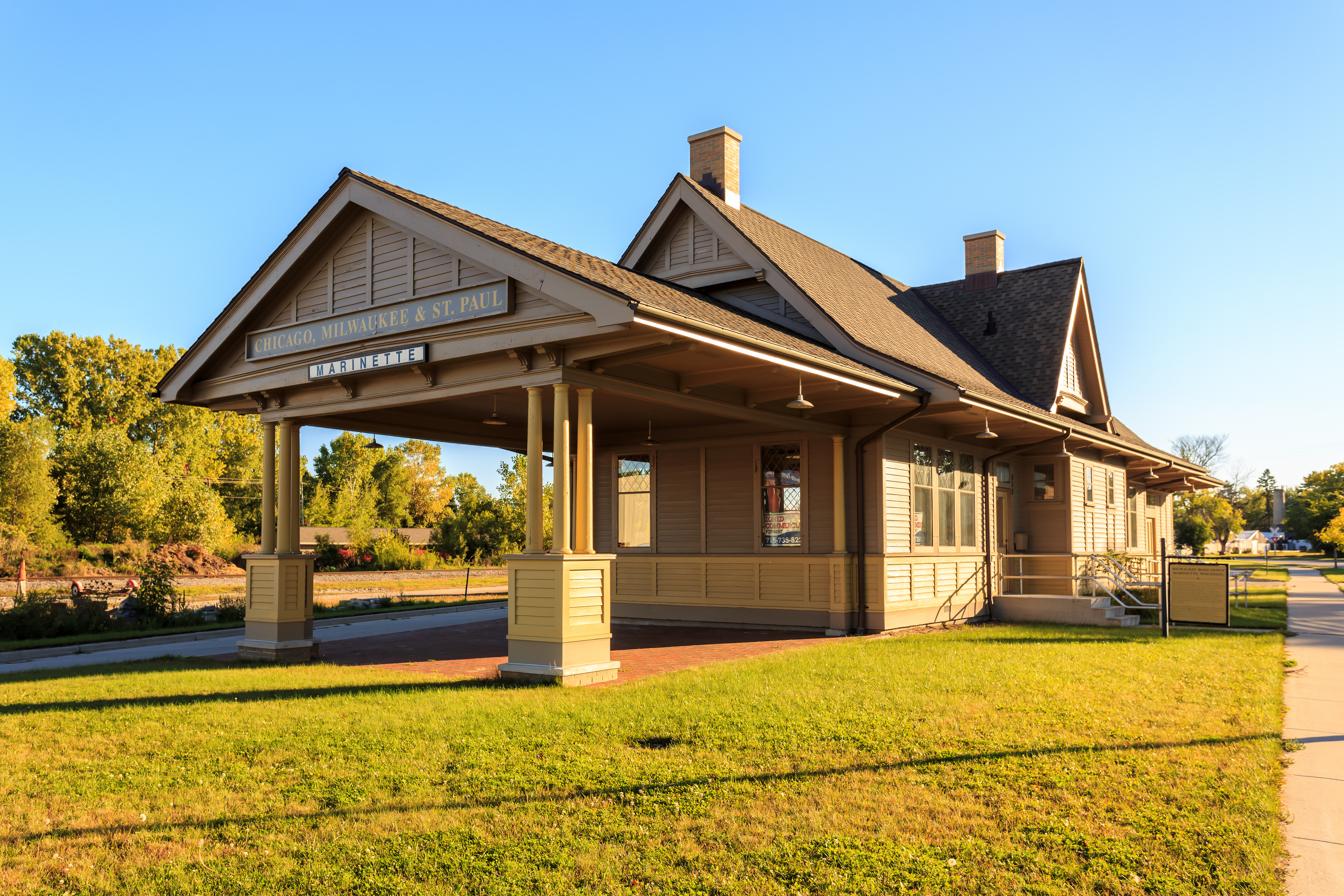
- Marinette station in September 2013.

General information
- Location: 650 Hattie Street, Marinette, Wisconsin 54143
- System: Former Milwaukee Road passenger rail station

History
- Opened: 1883

Services
Preceding station	Milwaukee Road	Following station
Bagley Junction toward Crivitz	Crivitz – Menominee	Menominee Terminus
- Milwaukee Road Depot
- U.S. National Register of Historic Places
- Location within Wisconsin
- Location: 650 Hattie Street; Marinette, Wisconsin
- Coordinates: 45°05′52″N 87°39′18″W
- Built: 1903
- Architect: J. U. Nettenstrom
- Architectural style: Late Victorian
- NRHP reference No.: 04001485
- Added to NRHP: January 12, 2005
Location

The Milwaukee Road Depot in Marinette, Wisconsin was built in 1903 by the Chicago, Milwaukee, St. Paul and Pacific Railroad (otherwise known as The Milwaukee Road) to replace an earlier depot.

== Overview ==
The depot is a one-story rectangular structure in the Queen Anne style. An open, covered area is located at one end of the depot. The depot originally had two passenger waiting areas, a women's waiting room at one end and the men's waiting room and freight room at the other. The station agent's office was located between the two waiting rooms. The depot was designed by J. U. Nettenstrom, a staff architect from the railroad. Nettenstrom also designed other depots in Wisconsin.

The railroads first entered Wisconsin for the lumber. Before the railroads, lumber had to be shipped by boat. Railroads allowed for the year-round harvesting of timber. The early economy of Marinette was based on the lumber industry. The Milwaukee Road entered Marinette in 1883. It built a spur from the mainline at Crivitz, Wisconsin to Marinette and Menominee, Michigan. The first Milwaukee & Northern Railroad passenger train from Ellis Junction, Wi arrived in January 1884.

As the number of passengers declined on the Milwaukee Road after World War II, it ceased passenger trains to Marinette and Menominee. The depot was served by buses from Crivitz. The depot continued to serve freight. In 1985, The Milwaukee Road went out of business and sold the rail line and depot to the Escanaba and Lake Superior Railroad (E&LS). The E&LS continued to use the depot as an office until 2004. The land was sold in order to build a drugstore and to realign the city street. The depot was sold to a developer, who moved it 400 feet to the south of its original position. The depot is still located adjacent to the E&LS tracks, thus preserving its setting. The developer plans to remodel the depot and make it into offices.

The depot was listed in the National Register of Historic Places because of its architecture and also because of its association with the commercial development of Marinette and with the railroad's association with the development of the timber industry.
