= Java station (South Dakota) =

Java

General information
- Location: 4020 Main Street, Java, South Dakota 57452
- System: Former Milwaukee Road passenger rail station

History
- Opened: 1901
- Closed: 1975

Services
| Preceding station | Milwaukee Road | Following station |
|---|---|---|
| Selby toward Seattle or Tacoma | Main Line | Bowdle toward Chicago |
- Java Depot
- U.S. National Register of Historic Places
- Location within South Dakota Location within the United States
- Location: Northwest corner of Railway Ave. and Main St., Java, South Dakota
- Coordinates: 45°30′17″N 99°53′12″W
- Area: less than one acre
- Built: 1901
- Architectural style: Combination depot
- NRHP reference No.: 01000640
- Added to NRHP: June 6, 2001
Location

The Java Depot, a combination passenger and freight railway station in Java, South Dakota, was built in 1901 by the Chicago, Milwaukee, and St. Paul Railway. It was listed on the National Register of Historic Places in 2001.

Started in the spring of 1901, it was built to a standardized plan and was completed quickly, in July. It served as a passenger depot until 1975, when passenger service was discontinued.
