= Albert Lea station =

Historic railway station in Minnesota, U.S.

Albert Lea
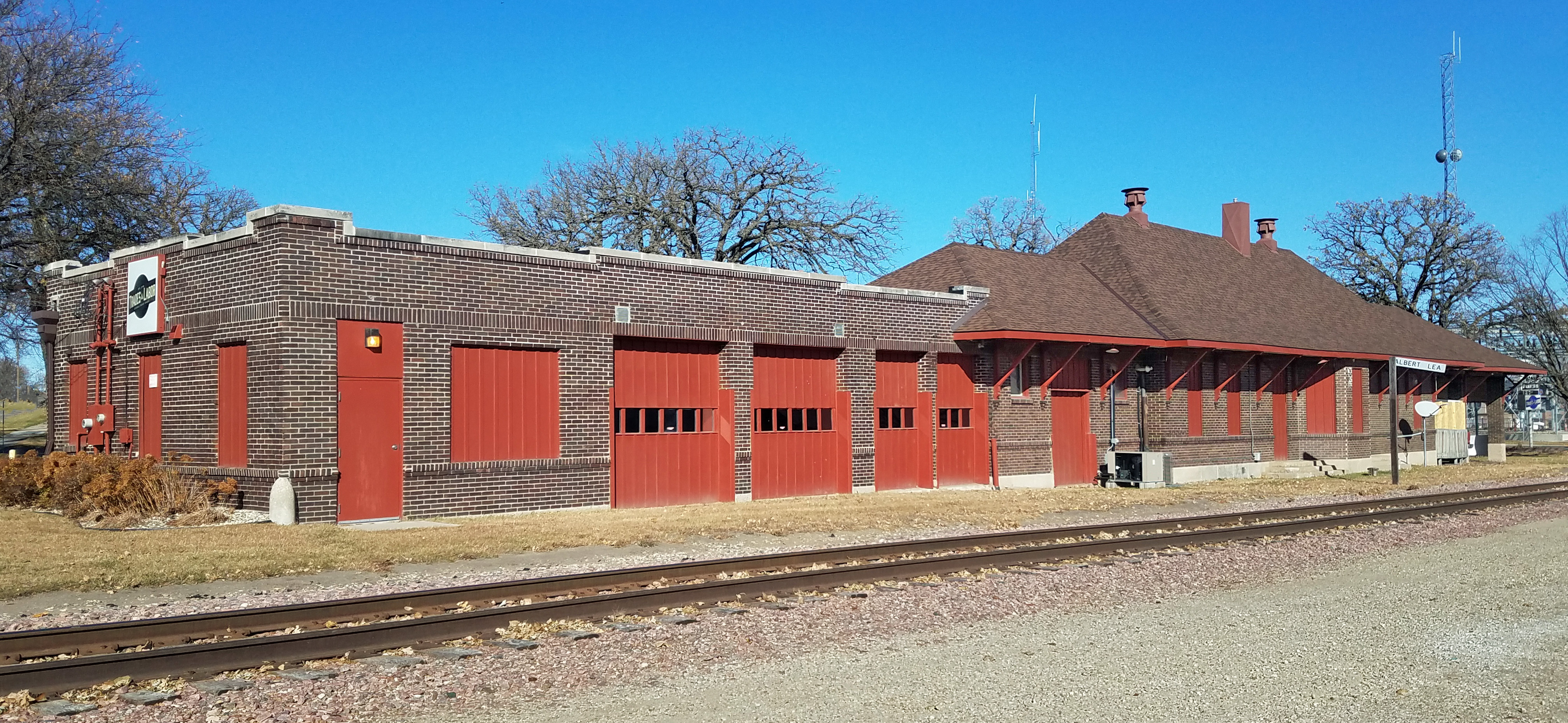
- Albert Lea station viewed from the south

General information
- Location: 606 South Broadway, Albert Lea
- Coordinates: 43°38′41″N 93°22′10″W
- System: Former Milwaukee Road passenger rail station

History
- Opened: 1914

Services
Preceding station	Milwaukee Road	Following station
Armstrong toward Wessington Springs	Wessington Springs – La Crosse	Hayward toward La Crosse
Freeborn toward St. Clair	Albert Lea – St. Clair	Terminus
- Chicago, Milwaukee, St. Paul and Pacific Railroad Depot
- U.S. National Register of Historic Places
- Location within Minnesota Location within the United States
- Location: Albert Lea, Minnesota
- Coordinates: 43°38′41″N 93°22′10″W
- Built: 1914
- Architect: J.A. Sundstrand
- NRHP reference No.: 82002954
- Added to NRHP: February 4, 1982
Location

The Chicago, Milwaukee, St. Paul and Pacific Railroad Depot in Albert Lea, Minnesota, United States, is a historic railway station. It was added to the National Register of Historic Places in 1982. The railroad line through Albert Lea was originally built by the Southern Minnesota Railroad circa 1868. The depot was built in 1914 and housed waiting, office and freight areas. An express office was added around 1930.
