= Jefferson station (Iowa) =

Historic building

Jefferson
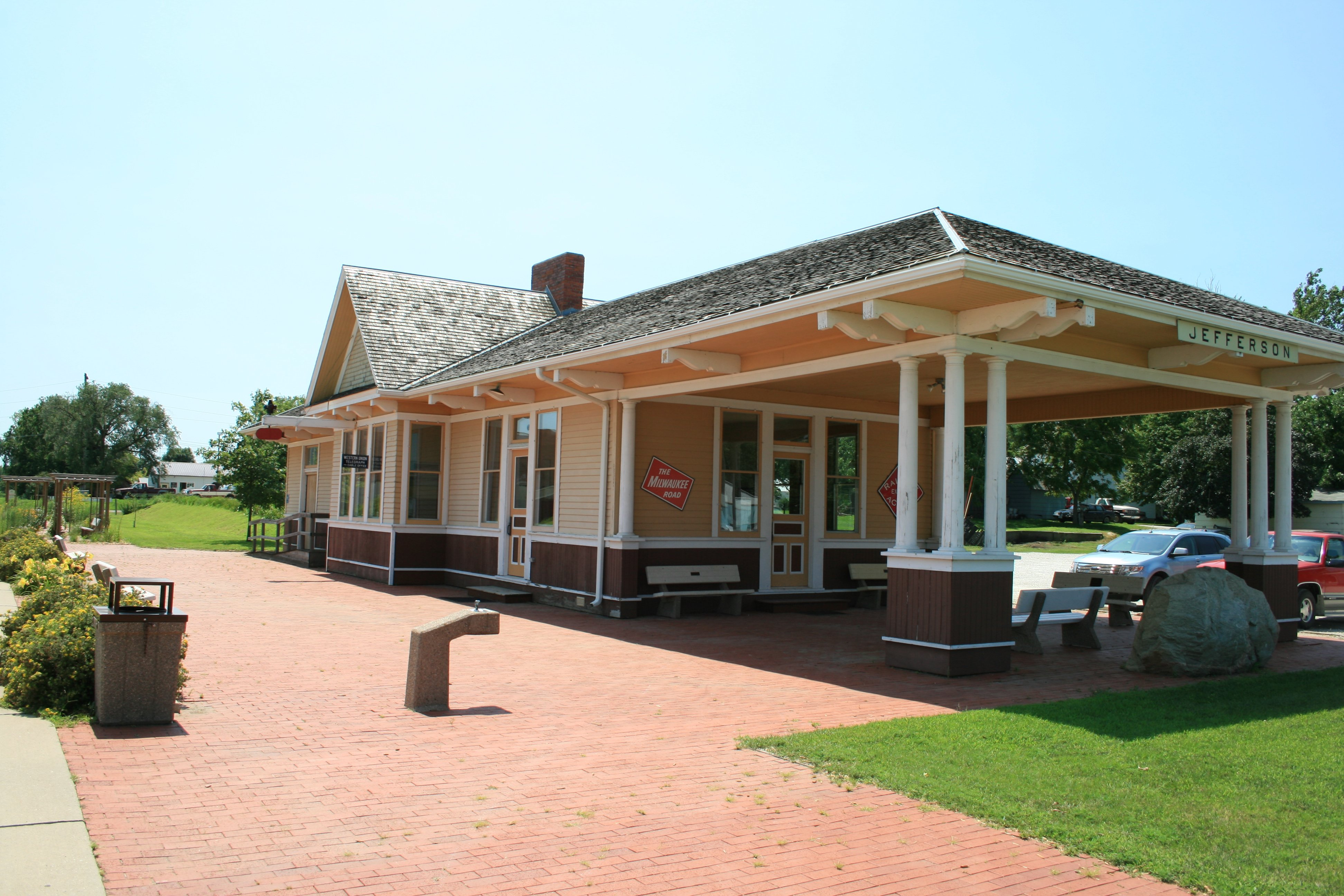
- Jefferson station in September 2012.

General information
- Location: 507 East Lincoln Way, Jefferson, Iowa 50129
- System: Former Milwaukee Road passenger rail station

Services
Preceding station	Milwaukee Road	Following station
Farlin toward Spirit Lake	Spirit Lake – Des Moines	Winkelmans toward Des Moines
- Chicago, Milwaukee & St. Paul Depot-Jefferson
- U.S. National Register of Historic Places
- Location within Iowa Location within the United States
- Location: 507 E. Lincoln Way; Jefferson, Iowa
- Coordinates: 42°0′54″N 94°22′06″W
- Built: 1906
- Architect: Chicago, Milwaukee & St Paul Bridge and Building Department
- MPS: Advent & Development of Railroads in Iowa MPS
- NRHP reference No.: 93000326
- Added to NRHP: September 30, 1994
Location

The Chicago, Milwaukee & St. Paul Depot-Jefferson, also known simply as the Milwaukee Depot is an historic building located in Jefferson, Iowa, United States. The rail line that this station served was built by the Wabash, St. Louis and Pacific Railway in either 1882 or 1883. It was part of the 500 miles (800 km) of track developed by Jay Gould in Iowa. Known as the High Bridge Route because of the height of the bridge over the Des Moines River, it was acquired by the Des Moines, Northern and Western Railroad in 1891. Four years later the Chicago, Milwaukee and St. Paul Railway acquired the line. The Milwaukee Road built this train station from their standard building plan between 1906 and 1909. It is almost identical to the station built in 1906 in Adel, Iowa. This passenger station replaced a combination passenger and freight depot that was moved and used solely as a freight depot. The Milwaukee Road discontinued passenger service in Jefferson in the early 1950s, and the depot continued as a freight office until 1980. The building was listed on the National Register of Historic Places in 1994.
