= Wisconsin & Michigan Railway =

Defunct Michigan railroad

Overview
- Other name(s): W&M
- Status: Defunct
- Locale: Wisconsin & Michigan

Service
- Type: Heavy Rail

History
- Commenced: 1894
- Planned opening: 1893
- Completed: 1908
- Closed: 1938

Technical
- Line length: 114 mi (183 km)
- Track length: 132.25 mi (212.84 km)
- Track gauge: 1,435 mm (4 ft 8 1/2 in)
- Old gauge: 3 ft (914 mm)
Wisconsin & Michigan Railway
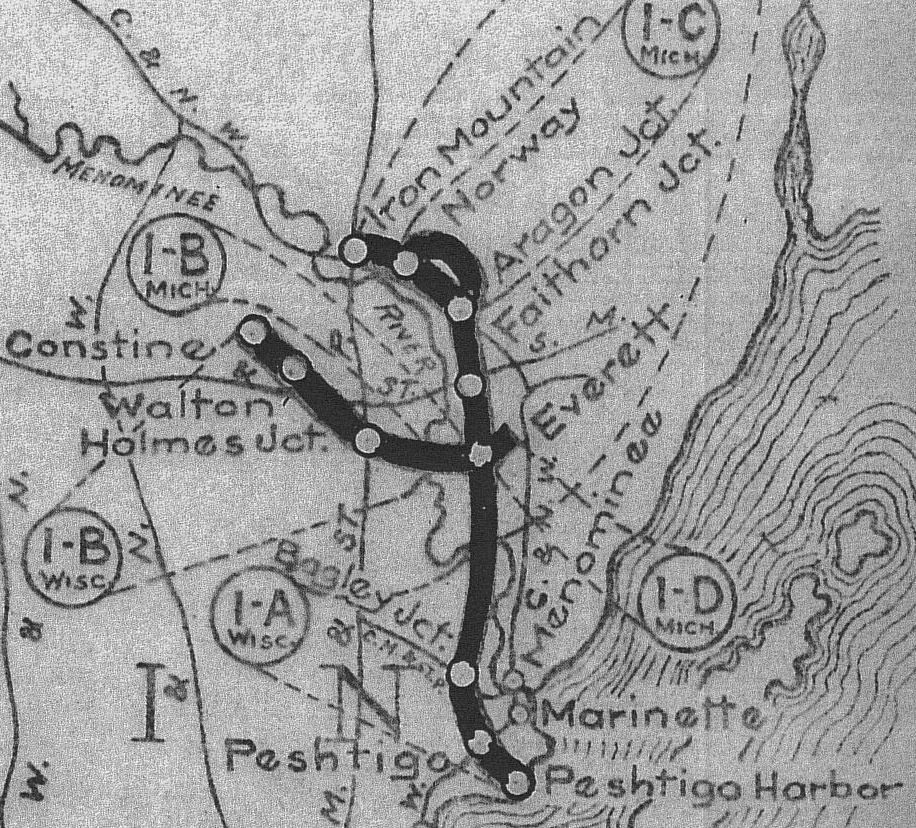
- Wisconsin & Michigan Railway map of June 30, 1916. ICC Division of Valuation.
Overview
- Other region: Wisconsin Michigan
- Headquarters: Bagley Junction, Wi
- Reporting mark: WM
- Predecessor: Ingalls, White Rapids and Northern

This article is about the Wisconsin & Michigan Railway. The Wisconsin and Michigan Railroad was incorporated January 31, 1881, in Wisconsin.

The Wisconsin & Michigan Railway (W&M) was incorporated October 26, 1893, under the general laws of Wisconsin for the purpose of constructing, maintaining, and operating a railroad as described in its articles of incorporation.

Chicago railroadman John N. Faithorn and his financial backers conceived of the Wisconsin and Michigan Railway as part of a railroad-car ferry transportation system which would connect the rich iron and timber lands of Michigan's Northern Peninsula with Chicago steel plants and lumber markets.

== Incorporation to 1900 ==
=== Early history ===
The W&M railway acquired six railroad corporations by purchasing their property, rights, and franchises. The railway also purchased the railroad property of the Peshtigo Lumber Company of Peshtigo, Wi. The W&M Railway was conceived in 1893 by John N Faithorn, a railroad tycoon from Chicago, Il. His idea was to build a railroad connect the iron-rich Upper Peninsula of Michigan, with the steel mills in cities using both railroads and lake ferries.

=== First track is laid (1894) ===
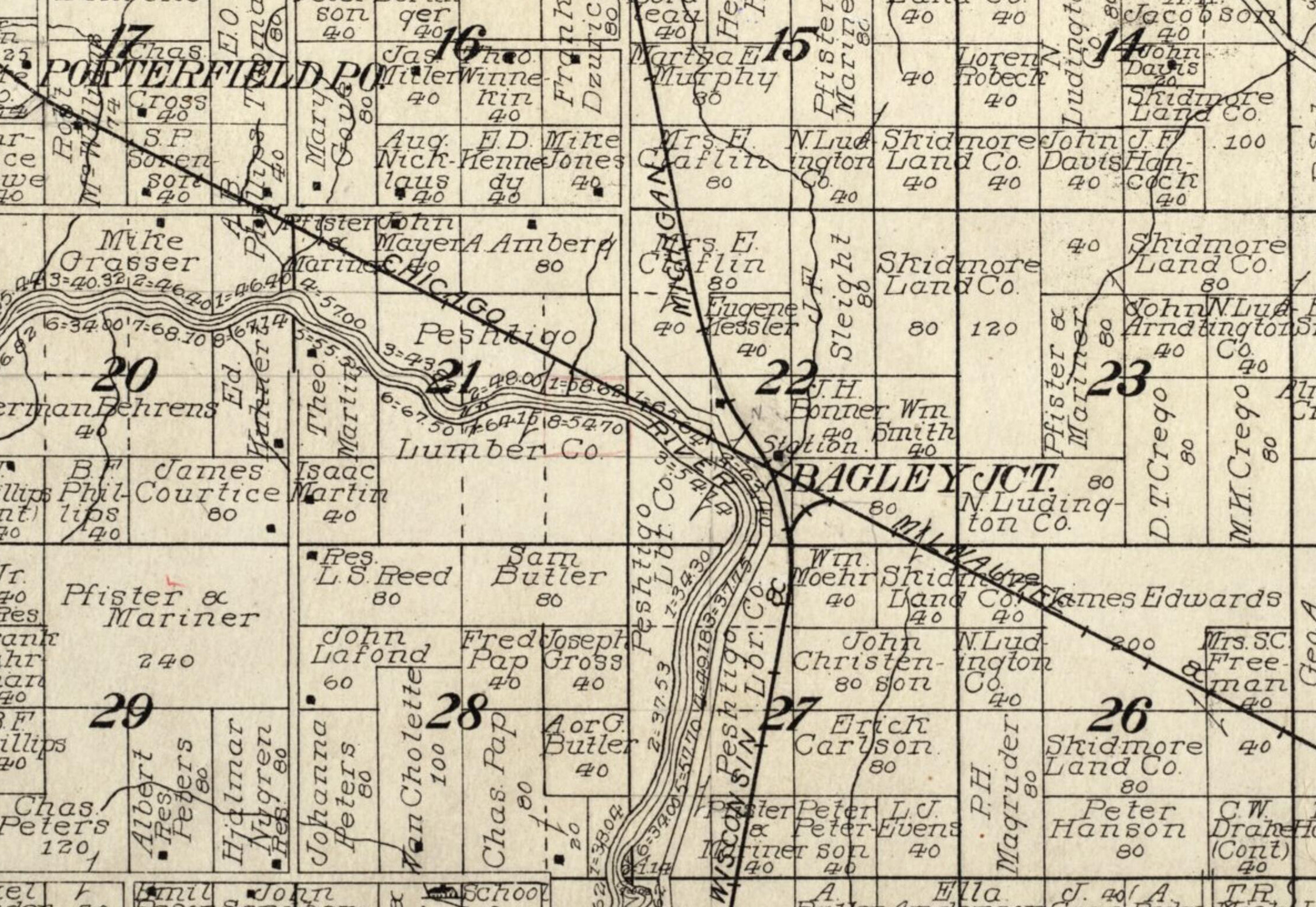
1912 map detail of Bagley Junction, Wisconsin

This railroad began building from the Soo Line railroad at Faithorn Junction in Michigan south about five miles. Faithorn was named for J. Nathan Faithorn, an official of the railroad. The initial ending point was the Ingalls, White Rapids & Northern Logging railway aka IWR&N. This location would later become known as Bagley Junction.

A five-mile section of the IWR&N was standard gauged from Ingalls, Michigan to the Menominee River, the state line. A bridge was built in 1894 to cross the Menominee River at Koss, Michigan to Wagner, Wisconsin.

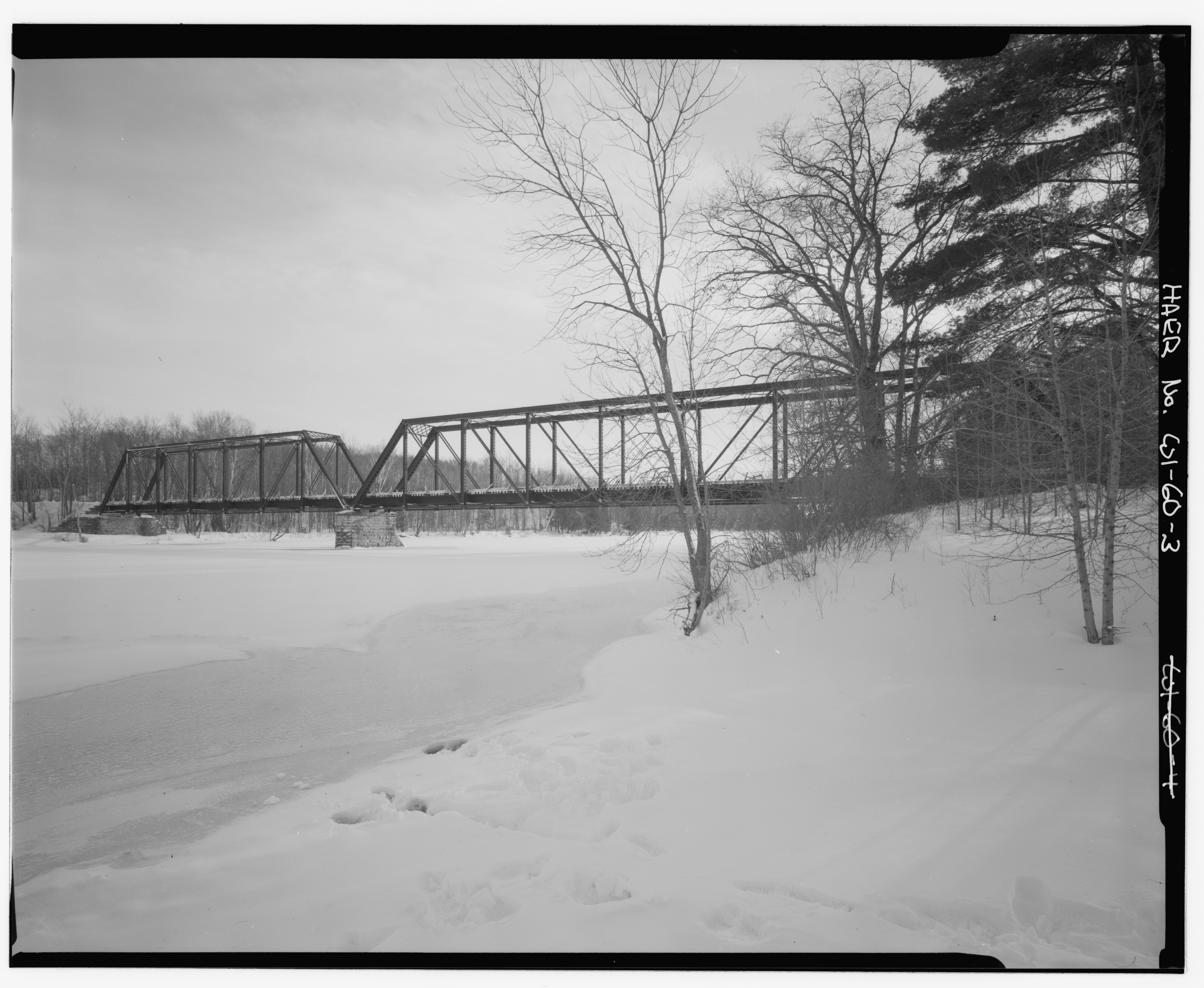
Wisconsin-Michigan Railroad bridge, spanning Menominee River, Marinette County, WI

On December 2, 1894, the Wisconsin & Michigan Railway began passenger service from Peshtigo, Wi to Faithorn Junction and two days later followed with freight trains.

=== Line south to Peshtigo (1894) ===
The railway had been unable to get dock frontage in Marinette or Menominee for its planned ferry service so the W&M instead purchased a line south to the harbor at Petshigo, Wi.

From 1894 to 1938, Bagley Junction was a railroad junction for the W & M line that ran north to Iron Mountain, Michigan. In 1894 the W & M built multiple coal sheds and water tanks at Bagley Junction. In 1894, the W & M opened an office and established a repair shop at Bagley Junction, employing near to sixty people.

In 1894, a number of branch lines would be constructed. This included a short lived one near Koss (abandoned 1895).

A branch line would be extended from Miscauno Island to Everett, Michigan. This branch to Miscauno Island connected to a logging railroad there Miscauno & North Western Railway Company that ran ~28 miles to Constine, Wisconsin. See map.

=== Ferry service begins (1895) ===
Begun in 1895 by a newly formed subsidiary of the Wisconsin and Michigan Railway: Lake Michigan Car Ferry Transportation Company (LMCFT Co.). Begun with a pair of wooden barges from the Peshtigo Harbor the service was run from there to South Chicago. Each barge was capable of holding 28 cars on deck, but no propulsion engine.

With a newly acquired tug the LMCFT Co. inaugurated service on August 31, 1895, delivering 26 cars of coal and merchandise from South Chicago to the Wisconsin and Michigan harbor slip in Peshtigo.

=== New locomotives arrive and lumber business expands (1895–1897) ===
In 1895 the W&M received a new Baldwin 10 wheeler and gave it number 8. It was too heavy for their light rail and was returned to Baldwin. They bought a smaller 10 wheeler, but it too performed poorly on the track north of Fischer. They kept the new locomotive and improved that section of track.

=== Lumber subsidiary sold (1889) ===
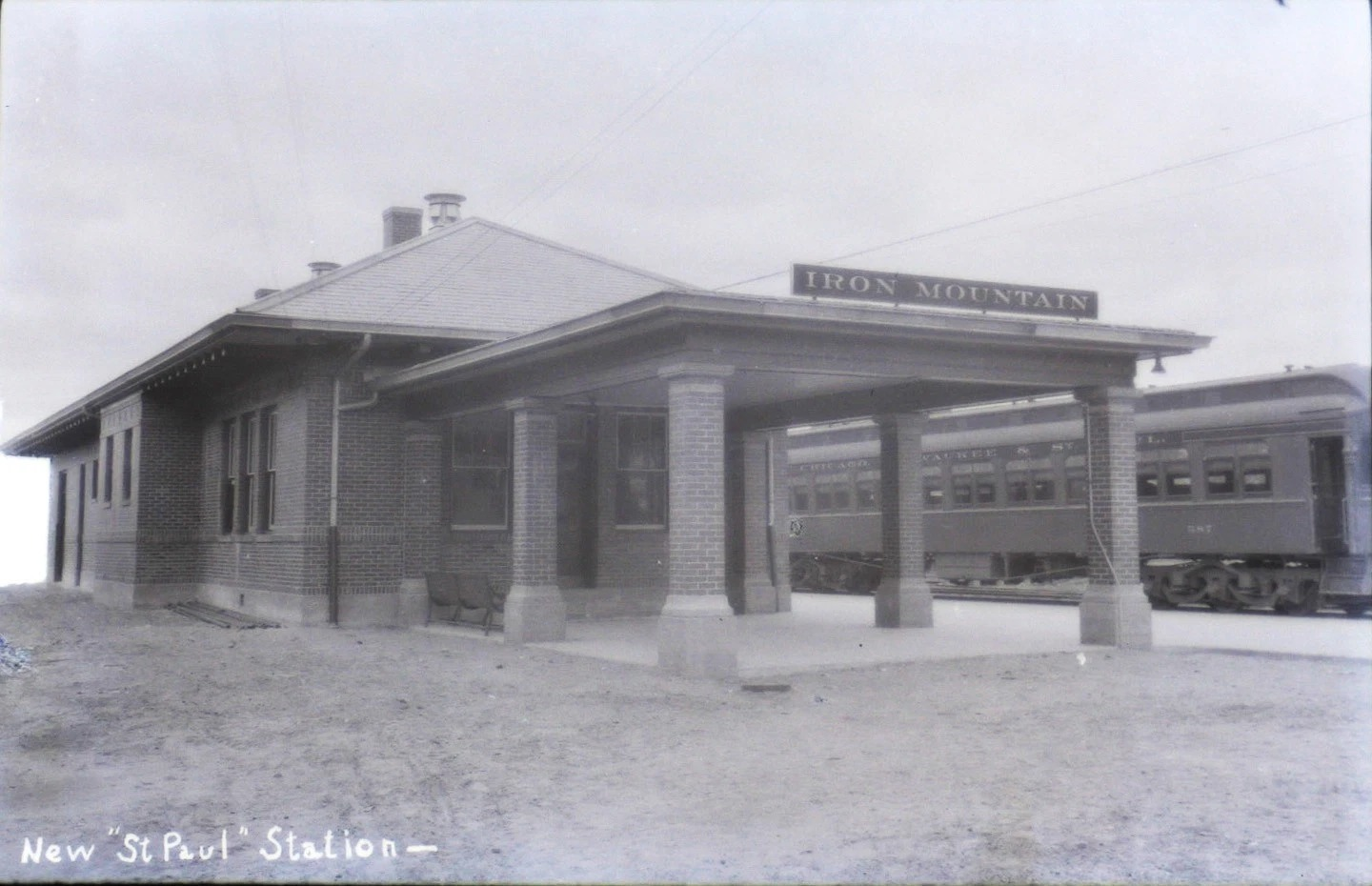
Iron Mountain Michigan - Chicago, Milwaukee, St. Paul and Pacific Railroad passenger train station.

=== Northward extension begins and misfortunes beset railway (1898) ===
From the cited references - "Wisconsin and Michigan Railway will Build Thirty Miles of New Road and Iron Mountain will be its Terminus. " and "Railroad scene near Quinnesec, Mich". Behind the train is C&NW RR line from Quinnesec to Iron Mountain, Mi.

The Wisconsin and Michigan Railway shared the Milwaukee Road train station at Iron Mountain.

=== Walsh orders improvements (1900) ===
Chicago capitalist John R. Walsh, owner of the Chicago Southern railroads, owner of the Chicago Terminal Transfer, founder of the Chicago National Bank and owner of the Southern Indiana purchased a controlling interest in the Railway in October 1900. Walsh ordered a rapid series of improvements. The W&M completely rebuilt the track between Faithorn Junction and Koss, improved the entire main line with new ballast, upgraded to 75 pound rail and constructed new stations to convert the ailing W&M into a major trunk line.

== 1901–1910 ==
=== Two branch lines added, new locomotives and cars and western division added (1901-04) ===
In 1903, the mainline would be extended north from Faithorn to Quinnesec, Michigan.

=== Miscauno Inn Opens & Ore Traffic Begins, Extension To Lake Superior & Walsh's Empire Collapses (1905) ===
Photograph of a crew employed by John Marsch to extend the Wisconsin & Michigan Railway from Faithorn Junction to Norway in 1903.

=== Improvements initiated and railway reaches maximum size (1905–1908) ===
In 1905 an extension of the Lake Noquebay Branch (begun in 1902)) 3.0 miles. In 1906 an extension of the Lake Noquebay Branch 1.0 miles. In 1907 an extension of the Lake Noquebay Branch 1.95 miles. Log shipments from Lake Noquebay to Peshtigo soon became the railroad's primary revenue source.

The railroad reached its maximum size in 1908, with a few logging operations on several branch lines.

==== Stations ====
Station	Miles (km)	Date opened	Date closed	Notes
Iron Mountain, Mi	76.3		1938	Freight House - H St.
Cundy Mine Junction	71.9		1938	aka Fumee Creek. Water tank.
Quinnesec, Mi	71.8		1938	
Few Mine	69.5		1938	
Nunro Mine	68.9		1938	
Omun, Mi			1938	
Norway, Mi	67.9		1938	
Bergam, Mi	64.1		1938	Vulcan Branch - Bergam to O'Callaghan Mill Spur
Loretto Junction	63.6		1938	Interchange with the C&NW Ore Line
O'Callaghan, Mi	62.8		1938	crossed under the C&NW
Aragon Junction	62.1		1938	5.5 mile branch to Aragon Mine in Norway, Mi.
Vista, Mi	60.4		1938	
Hamlin, Mi	52.0/58.8		1938	Miles to Peshtigo / miles to Peshtigo harbor
Berta, Mi	50.0		1938	
Faithorn Junction, Mi	48.5		1938	Soo Line Railroad connection
Blum, Mi	46.5		1938	
Brooks, Mi	46.0		1938	
Bird, Mi	45.5		1938	
Houte, Mi	43.5		1938	
Hammond "Y"	41.0		1938	
Nathan, Mi	40.5		1938	
Everett Junction, Mi	40.0		1938	Walton branch - 22.1 mi.
Arnold, Mi	39.25		1938	
Gardner, Mi	38.0		1938	
Ames, Mi	34.25		1938	
Swanson, Mi	33.25		1938	
Kells, Mi	30.5		1938	
Longrie, Mi	28		1938	
Koss, Mi	26.5		1938	
Menominee River bridge		1894	1991	converted to road use 1938; Replaced 1991
Packard, Wi	23		1938	
McAllister, Wi	21		1938	
Wagner, Wi	19		1938	
Goll, Wi	17.75		1938	
Kinsman, Wi	16.5		1938	
Miles, Wi	14.5		1938	
Twin Creek, Wi	13		1938	Lake Noquebay Branch
Walsh, Wi	11		1938	
Bagley Junction, Wi	6		1938	Milwaukee Road interchange. 8.5 miles to Menominee, Mi
Knox, Wi	1.75		1938	
Peshtigo, Wi	0		1938	Interchange with the C&NW
Places Rapids, Wi	-3.1		1938	
Peshtigo Harbor, Wi	-6.1		1938	

=== Financier Sent To Prison & Railway Service Reduced - 1910 ===
John Walsh was the financier chiefly responsible for the 1900 upgrading and re-equipping the railroad. He began serving a 5 year prison term at Leavenworth for loaning himself millions of dollars from his Chicago National Bank and used it to develop his various railroads.

== 1911 - 1938 ==
=== Marsch buys the railway - 1917 ===
On June 13, 1916, the railway line extended from Peshtigo Harbor, Wisconsin, to Iron Mountain, Michigan, with branch lines extending from Everett, Aragon Junction, and Bergam, Michigan. A total of 114 miles of mainline and 17 miles of yard and sidings.

=== Ferry automobile traffic increases - 1919 ===
Congressman Frank D. Scott helped the railroad obtained more favorable freight rates. Businessmen from Chicago and Minneapolis were persuaded by Menominee and Marinette shippers to route their freight via the W&M which increased between the Ann Arbor ferry slip at Menominee and the rest of their railway and onward to the Soo Line as well. Automobiles transported from lower Michigan factories to Minneapolis and the Northwest was a big boost to the railroad. Some traffic from Ohio and Michigan agricultural implements and machinery grew this volume following the Ann Arbor - W&M - Soo Line route. A heavy traffic in automobiles, covered with tarps were shipped on flat cars or in boxcars. A record load was hauled On June 7, 1920 - 90 new Dort automobiles on 31 flat cars to the Soo Line. Lumber for Ford Motor company was also hauled to be forwarded by the Ann Arbor Railroad ferrys.

The railroad opened business offices in Pittsburgh, Dayton, Detroit, Minneapolis and Seattle. They began using the motto "Short Route To and From The Northwest" in advertising.

=== New locomotives arrive - 1920 ===
The Commercial Atlas of America; Rand McNally Black and White Mileage Map, Michigan 1924 edition has an excellent depiction of the railroad's mainline.

=== Depression era - 1929 ===
The Wisconsin & Michigan Railway was unable to find a buyer for the line, applied for abandonment on April 10, 1937.

On January 20, 1938, the ICC authorized the Wisconsin & Michigan Railway abandonment. The branch line to Walsh, Wi was removed in 1938. The Chicago & North Western Railroad bought the Menominee W & M Railroad property in early 1939.
