= Aberdeen station (Milwaukee Road) =

Aberdeen
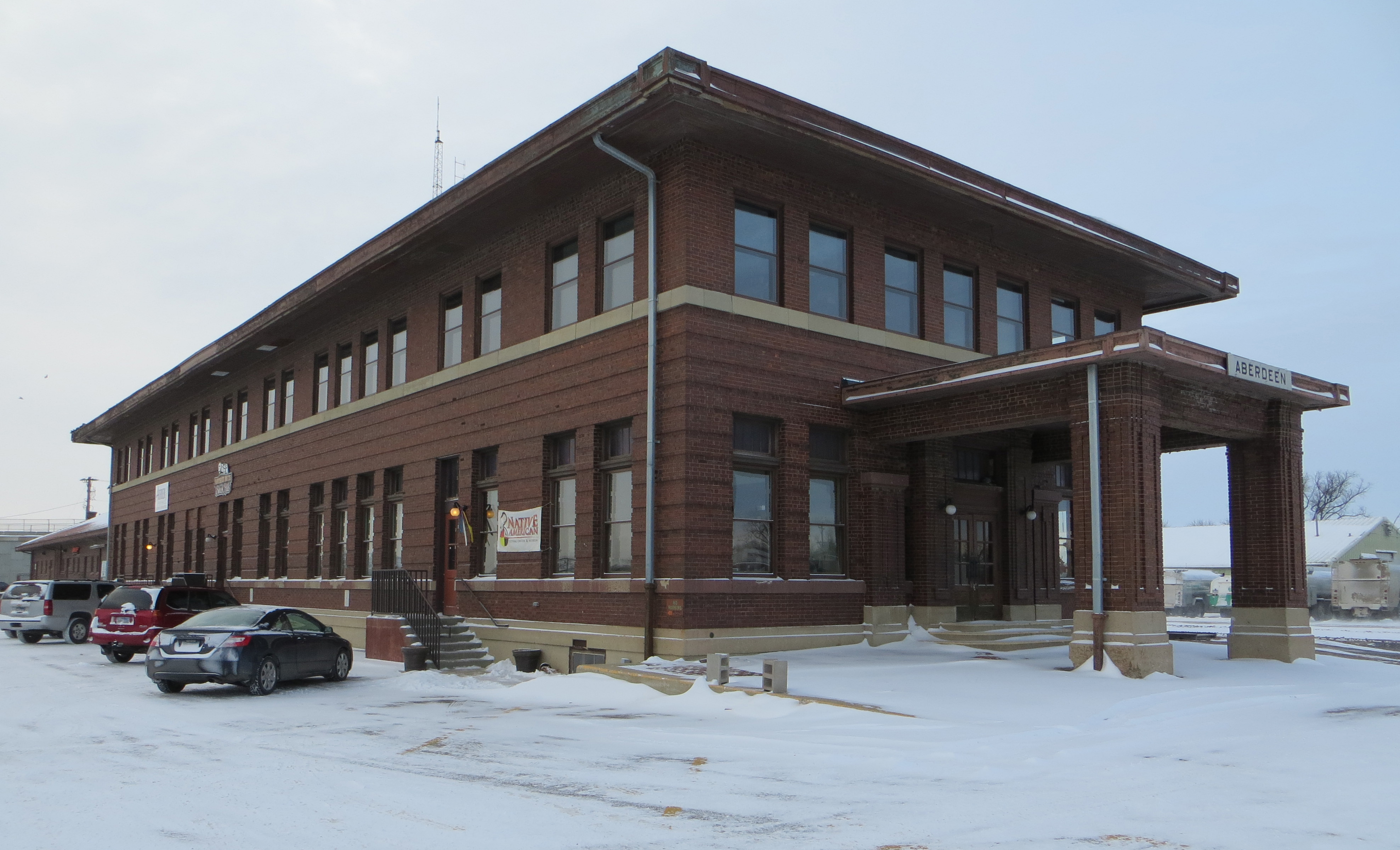
- Aberdeen station in January 2015.

General information
- Location: 10 Railroad Avenue SW, Aberdeen, South Dakota 57041
- System: Former Milwaukee Road passenger rail station

History
- Opened: 1911
- Closed: April 17, 1969

Former services
Preceding station	Milwaukee Road	Following station
Mina toward Seattle or Tacoma	Main Line	Bath toward Chicago
Terminus	Aberdeen – Manilla	Warner toward Manilla
Gage toward Edgeley	Edgeley Branch	Terminus
- Chicago, Milwaukee, St. Paul and Pacific Railroad Depot
- U.S. National Register of Historic Places
- Location within South Dakota Location within the United States
- Location: Main St and Railroad Ave; Aberdeen, South Dakota
- Coordinates: 45°27′56″N 98°29′21″W
- Built: 1911
- Architectural style: Prairie School
- NRHP reference No.: 77001238
- Added to NRHP: September 20, 1977
Location

The Chicago, Milwaukee, St. Paul and Pacific Railroad Depot in Aberdeen, South Dakota was built by the Chicago, Milwaukee, St. Paul and Pacific Railroad (also known as The Milwaukee Road) in 1911.

The depot is rectangular in shape, two stories, and is built of brick and concrete. Its style reflects the Craftsman/Prairie influences of the early 20th century. It was built to replace an earlier wooden depot that burned. Aberdeen served as a division point on the Milwaukee Road and the upper floors of the depot contained railroad offices. In its heyday the station served the Milwaukee Road's Olympian Hiawatha, which ran from Chicago to Seattle and Tacoma. Passenger trains last served the station for Minneapolis on April 17, 1969.

The depot is the largest brick passenger depot still standing in South Dakota. It was listed in the National Register due to its architecture and association with the development of railroads in South Dakota.

The building was bought by an investment company that leases office space. The basement of the depot houses a model railroad club.
