= Menominee (automobile) =

Defunct American motor vehicle manufacturer

Menominee Electric (Dudly Electric)
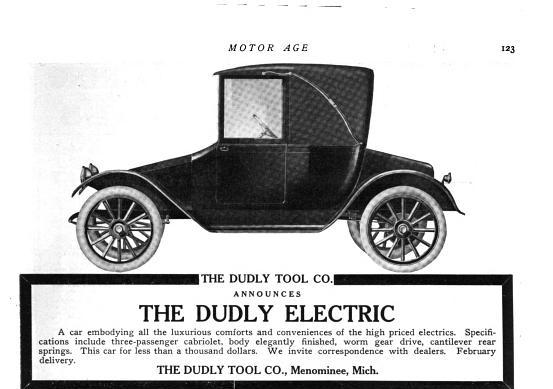
- 1915 Menominee Electric (Dudly Electric)

Overview
- Type: Automobile
- Manufacturer: Menominee Electric Company
- Production: 1915
- Assembly: Menominee, Michigan

Body and chassis
- Body style: Cabriolet
- Related: Dudly Bug

Powertrain
- Electric motor: Menominee
- Power output: Top-speed - 20 mph
- Electric range: 50-60 miles

Dimensions
- Wheelbase: 108-inches

The Menominee was an electric automobile built in Menominee, Michigan by the Menominee Electric Manufacturing Company in 1915.

== History ==
Menominee Electric Manufacturing Company mainly built electric motors, telephones and electric appliances. Menominee controlled Dudly Tool Company, makers of the Dudly Bug cyclecar and used that experience to develop a light electric cabriolet. The cabriolet had a 108-inch wheelbase, with a top speed of 20 mph and a range of 50–60 miles on each charge. A price of $1,250 also included a recharging kit for the battery. Production had started in July 1915, but had ended by the end of the year. The planned production quota of 125 electric automobiles was not reached; unsold Menominees were rebranded as the Dudly Electric and offered for less than $1,000.

== See also ==
- List of defunct United States automobile manufacturers
- History of the electric vehicle
