= Menominee Opera House =

Entertainment venue in Menominee, Michigan

Coordinates: 45°6′12″N 87°36′10″W

- Menominee Theatre
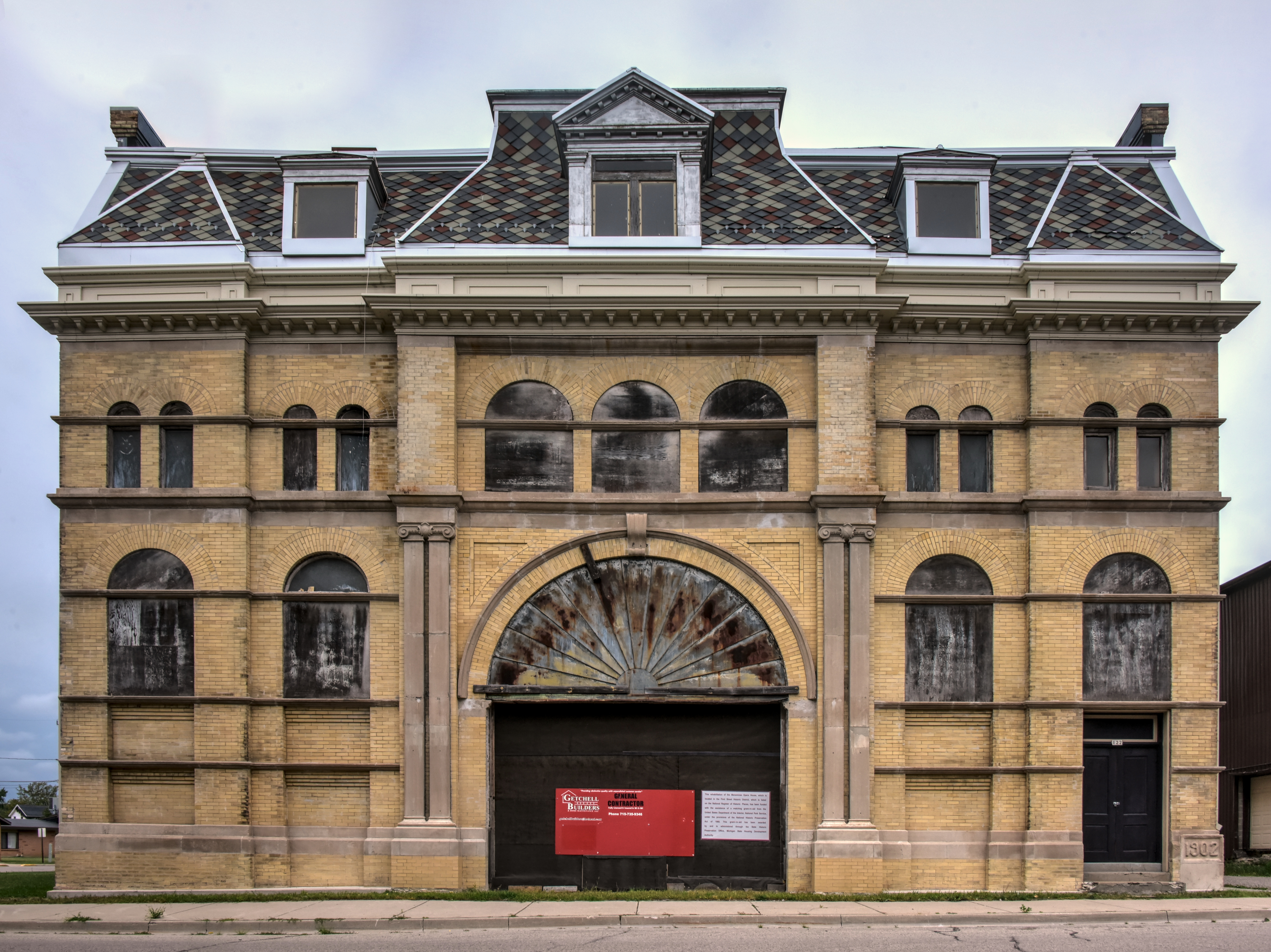
- Menominee Opera House in September 2020
- Interactive map of Menominee Opera House
- Location: Menominee, Michigan

History
- Built: 1902
- Original use: Live performance venue

Site notes
- Area: First Street Historic District
- Architect: George O. Garnsey
- Owner: The Menominee Opera House Committee, Inc.
- Website: http://www.menomineeoperahouse.org

Built in 1902, the Menominee Opera House (later known as Menominee Theatre) resides in the Historic Waterfront District of downtown Menominee, Michigan. It was designed by well-known American architect George O. Garnsey, whose other designs include the Ogle County Courthouse in Oregon, Illinois and Queen Anne style homes such as the Ellwood House in DeKalb, Illinois.

== History ==
Construction of The Menominee Opera House was funded "primarily through the sale of stock by a group of prominent lumber barons who desired to enhance the cultural life of the community". Early performances included the talents of John Philip Sousa, Maude Adams and Texas Guinan. The opera house was also used for political rallies, suffrage meetings and local productions as well.

The diminishing popularity of live entertainment, brought on by the rise of motion pictures, caused the facility to shift its primary focus from live performances to movies. However, the opening of a competing movie theater quickly proved too much for the opera house. The facility closed its doors in 1929.

After ownership of the building was turned over to the city, The Menominee Opera House served as a local community auditorium (a.k.a. Civic Auditorium) from 1929 until around 1945. At which time, it was opened once again as a movie house under the name of The Menominee Theater. In addition to movies, the re-opened entertainment venue still managed to bring in a few live acts as well, including performances by big band leader Tiny Hill.

Despite a successful re-opening of the facility that had at one time been the pride of the city, the new era would be short-lived. Around 2 AM on March 9, 1950, a fire broke out in the boiler room under the stage. By the time that the fire was discovered, flames were already rising out from the roof. Although firefighters were able to contain the fire before it reached the auditorium, the damage sustained as a result of the fire was increased due to the freezing of the water used to battle the blaze in the harsh winter cold. Overall, the cost of the damage was estimated at around $30,000 - a total loss. However, after the fire, the building was purchased during bankruptcy proceedings. The new owner re-purposed the building as a warehouse. This action saved it from being torn down.

== Future ==
While the ultimate fate of this historic building has balanced the line between restoration and condemnation, there have been several different efforts over the past few decades to restore The Menominee Opera House. The most recent group was put together in 2004 under the name of The Menominee Opera House Committee, Inc. After two years of fundraising, this non-profit organization of local volunteers was given the deed to the building by the Vennema family corporation, which had owned it since 1979. Their goal is summed up in the group's objective: "Restoring the historic Menominee Opera House to become a multifunctional performing arts center".

Fundraising efforts and restoration work by The Menominee Opera House Committee, Inc. are currently in full swing. They were awarded a $45,000 grant in June 2012 and a $27,000 grant in May 2015 by the State Historic Preservation Office of Michigan. The group also had its first in a series of planned live events titled "Theatre in the Ruin" on September 14, 2014. The event included four musical acts. It was the first time that a scheduled live performance had taken place in the building in over 70 years. Although the overall pace of the project work has increased in recent years, the restoration is still expected to take several years to complete depending on funding.
