= Bagley Junction, Wisconsin =

- Unincorporated community
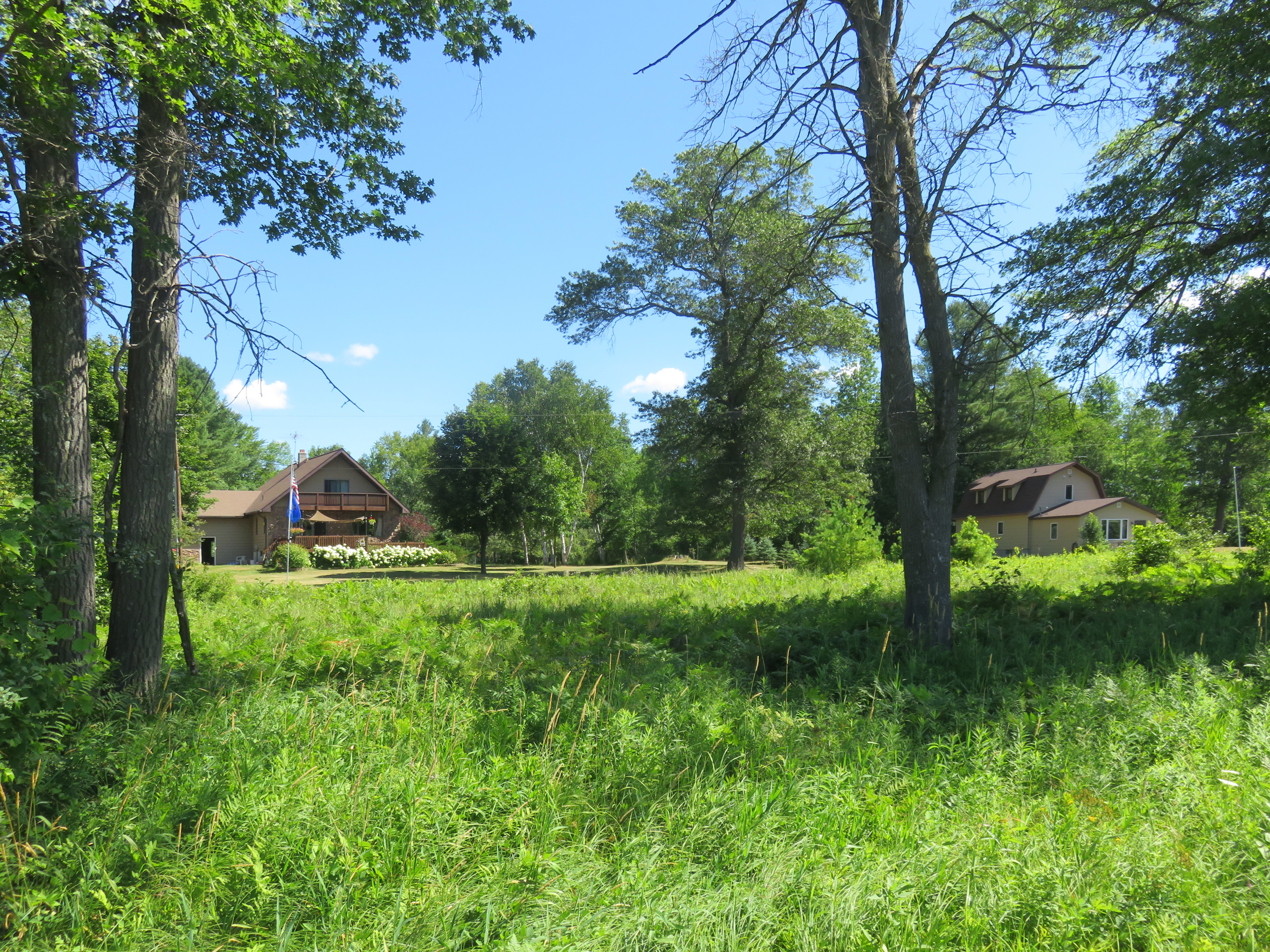

- Location within Wisconsin Location within the United States
- Coordinates: 45°08′18″N 87°45′04″W
- Country: United States
- State: Wisconsin
- County: Marinette
- Elevation: 630 ft (190 m)
- Time zone: UTC-6 (Central (CST))
  - Summer (DST): UTC-5 (CDT)
- Area codes: 715 & 534
- GNIS feature ID: 1577500

Bagley Junction is an unincorporated community located in the town of Porterfield, Marinette County, Wisconsin, United States.

== Geography ==
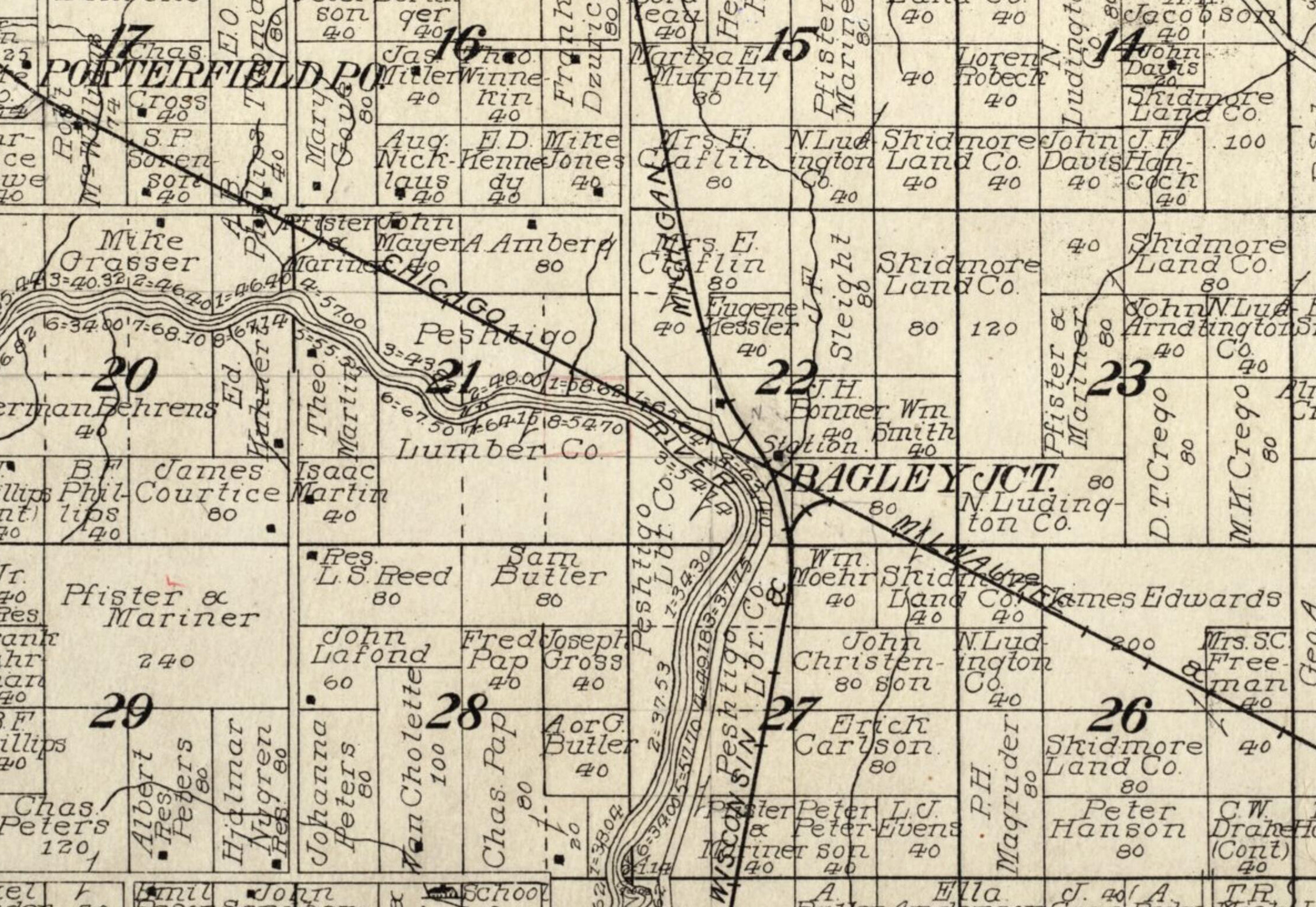
Bagley Junction, 1912 map detail

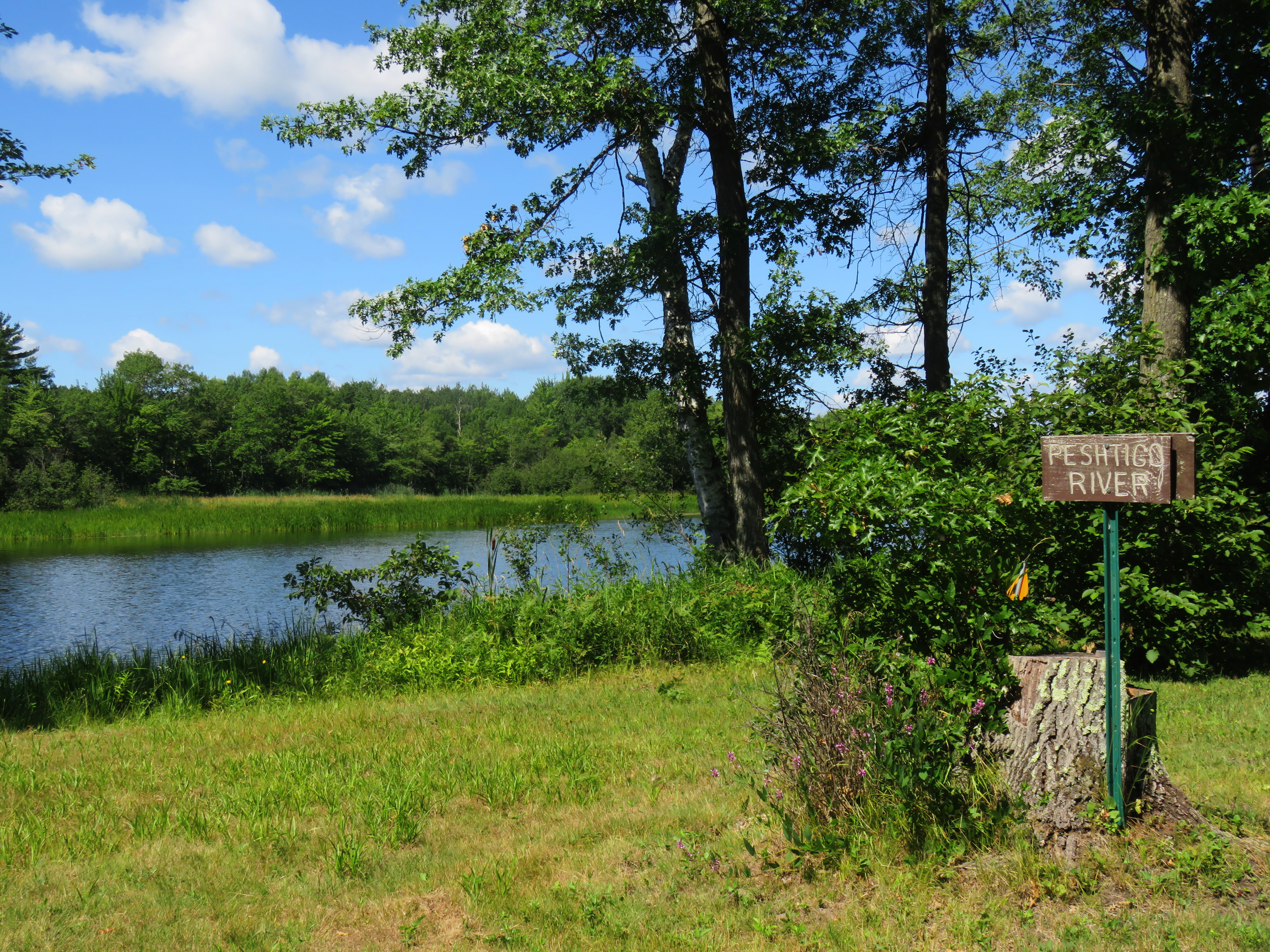
The Peshtigo River in Bagley Junction

Bagley Junction is located on Bagley Road on the left bank of the Peshtigo River, at the north end of the Potato Rapids Reservoir, at an elevation of 630 feet (190 m). It is connected by road to Walsh to the north, Porterfield to the west (via Grasser Road), Peshtigo to the south (via Right of Way Road), and Marinette to the east (via Wisconsin Highway 64).

== Etymology ==
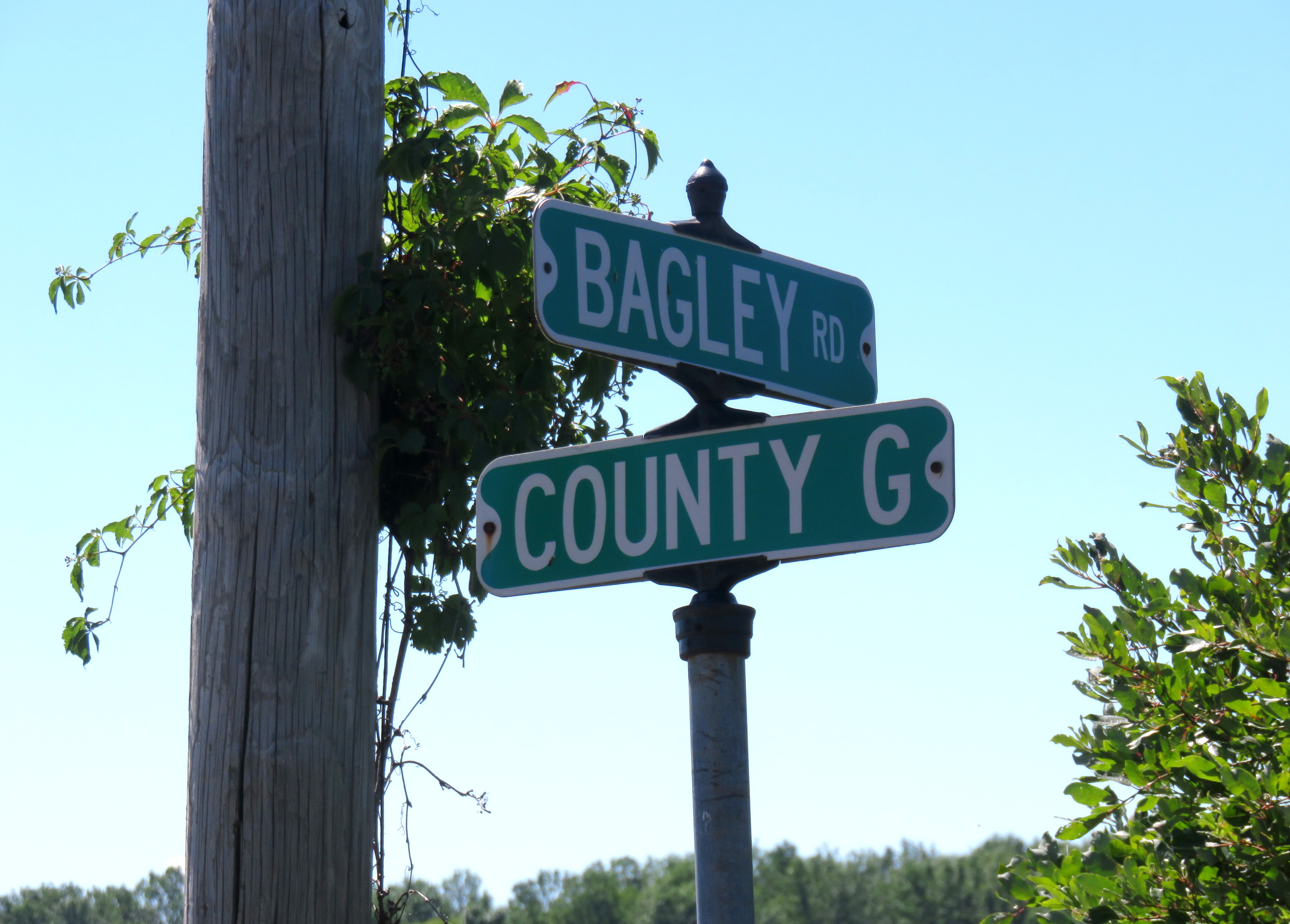
Sign for Bagley Road in Walsh

Bagley Junction and Bagley Road, which passes through the community, are named for John Bagley (June 20, 1852 Quebec – August 17, 1920 Tacoma, Washington), a lumberman. After his early activity in Wisconsin, Bagley was active in Washington and later became president of the Tacoma Eastern Railroad. There is another Bagley Junction, also named after John Bagley, in King County, Washington.

== History ==
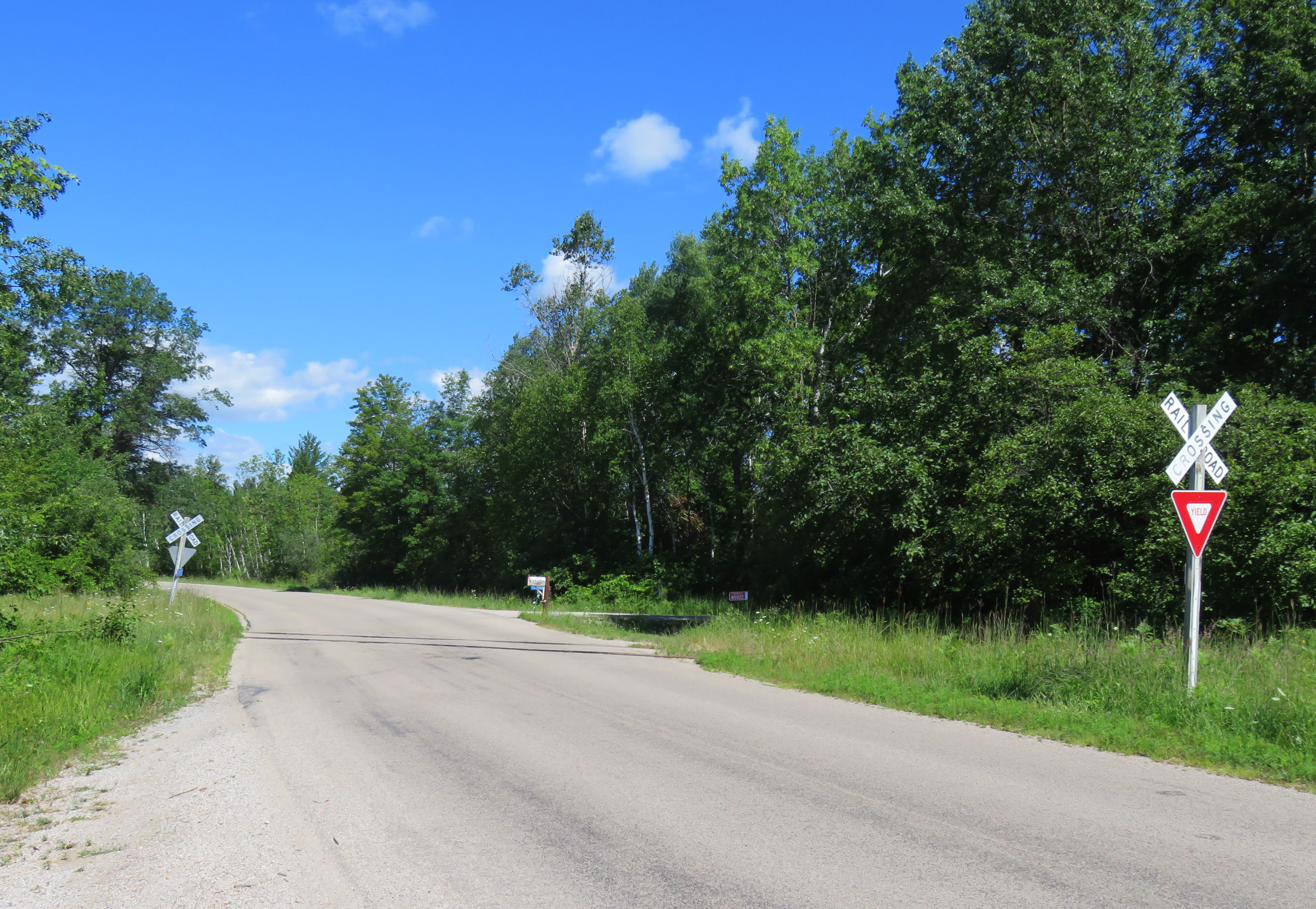
Rail crossing in Bagley Junction

Bagley Junction was inhabited by Native Americans before the arrival of white settlers. Four oval burial mounds known as the Bagley Junction Mounds were mapped by Harvey O. Younger (1889–1956) in 1913, when he also discovered a stone hoe at the site. Shell content indicates that the mounds were formed from soil taken from the bank of the Peshtigo River. The mounds may be associated with a Late Woodland habitation. The burial mounds were further investigated in 2007 during an archaeological survey for a road project. The survey identified two mounds about 75 feet (23 m) apart between Bagley Road and the Peshtigo River; the southern mound measures 30 by 18.5 feet (9.1 m × 5.6 m) and is about 15 inches (380 mm) high, and the northern mound measures 22 by 19 feet (6.7 m × 5.8 m) and is about 18 inches (460 mm) high. There is no surface evidence of the other two mounds mapped in 1913; it is believed they were destroyed by a former driveway that is now used as a snowmobile trail.

In 1894, the Wisconsin & Michigan Railway opened an office and established workshops at Bagley Junction, employing up to sixty men. That year the company also erected coal sheds and water tanks at the site. From 1894 to 1938, the site was a railroad junction for a line that ran north to Walsh and onward to Iron Mountain, Michigan. The line was built using surplus rail from the Chicago World's Fair, which had closed in 1893. The line to Walsh was removed in 1938, but an east-west branch line that belonged to the former Milwaukee Road still exists. The track is currently owned by Escanaba and Lake Superior Railroad.

In the early 20th century a lumber camp and sawmill operated in Bagley Junction. In the 1920s, Andrew Jackson Smith (1832–1929), a resident of the community and a Civil War veteran, was jocularly known as the "mayor" of Bagley Junction.

Bagley Junction had three houses in 2010, when it was also the site of the USCA National Canoe and Kayak Championships.

Preceding station	Milwaukee Road	Following station
Porterfield toward Crivitz	Crivitz – Menominee	Marinette toward Menominee
