= Jordan College (Michigan) =

Jordan College was a liberal arts college in Michigan that closed in 1996. It had campuses at Cedar Springs, Flint, Grand Rapids (School of Hair Design/ Business) and Detroit. Earlier in the 1990s Jordan College had been involved in litigation regarding claims of mismanagement of federal student aid dollars.

== History ==
The college was originally known as Wesleyan Bible Institute, an affiliate of the United Holiness Church. In 1980, the college, with seven branches throughout Michigan, severed its ties with the church and changed its mission to serve needy students.

Jordan College opened its branch campuses in 1967. It first sought accreditation with a regional accreditation organization in 1988. By the 1990s it was faced with charges of fraud, although it was claimed by Carl Levin among others, that Jordan was just suffering from hard economic times. However it appears some individuals, specifically one time trustee James Moored, had been involved in outright fraud.

== Jordan University ==
There are also records of a school that was established in 1932 and closed in 1955 called "Team Jordan College" or sometimes "Team Jordan Seminary" located in Menominee, Michigan. Records from this institution have been believed to be housed at University of Wisconsin–Whitewater. The reference cite however has falsely sited UW-W as they hold only UW-W and some Milton records The school had a sports program and football team coached by Leonard J. Umnus.

Jordan College's basketball team appeared in the 1938 NAIA basketball tournament. They team advanced to the quarterfinals, losing to Washburn, 44–21.
