= Porterfield, Wisconsin =

- Town
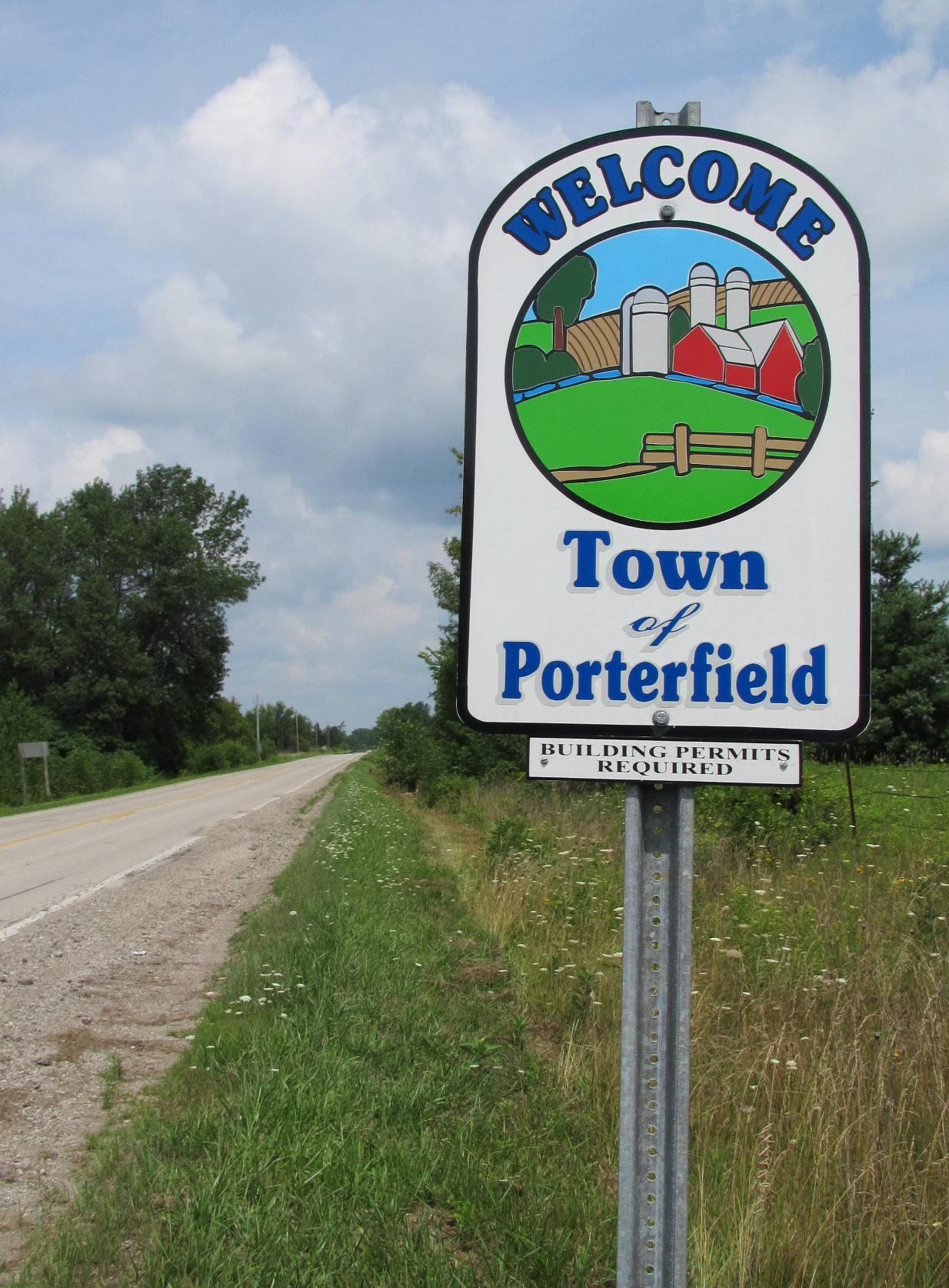
- Welcome sign at County Hwy E and State Hwy 64

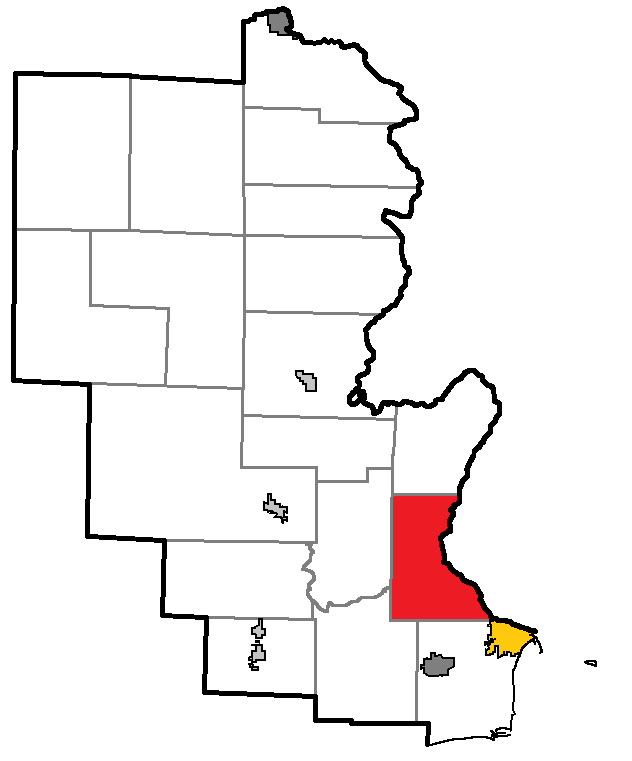
- Location of Porterfield, within Marinette County
- Coordinates: 45°10′0″N 87°44′38″W
- Country: United States
- State: Wisconsin
- County: Marinette

Area
  - Total: 53.3 sq mi (138.1 km^{2})
  - Land: 51.8 sq mi (134.1 km^{2})
  - Water: 1.5 sq mi (4.0 km^{2})
- Elevation: 659 ft (201 m)

Population (2020)
  - Total: 1,888
  - Density: 36.46/sq mi (14.08/km^{2})
- Time zone: UTC-6 (Central (CST))
  - Summer (DST): UTC-5 (CDT)
- FIPS code: 55-64275
- GNIS feature ID: 1583957
- Website: https://www.townofporterfield.com/

Porterfield is a town in Marinette County, Wisconsin, United States. The population was 1,888 at the 2020 census. The unincorporated communities of Bagley Junction, Miles, Porterfield, Rubys Corner, and Walsh are located in the town.

== History ==
The Town of Porterfield was separated from the original two townships in the county, Marinette and Peshtigo, on March 26, 1887. It was named after a local farmer and businessman, John Porterfield.

== Geography ==
According to the United States Census Bureau, the town has a total area of 53.3 square miles (138.1 km^{2}), of which 51.8 square miles (134.1 km^{2}) is land and 1.5 square miles (4.0 km^{2}) (2.89%) is water.

== Demographics ==
As of the census of 2000, there were 1,991 people, 770 households, and 603 families residing in the town. The population density was 38.5 inhabitants per square mile (14.9/km^{2}). There were 848 housing units at an average density of 16.4 per square mile (6.3/km^{2}). The racial makeup of the town was 98.95% White, 0.10% African American, 0.05% Native American, 0.05% from other races, and 0.85% from two or more races. Hispanic or Latino of any race were 0.10% of the population.

There were 770 households, out of which 33.5% had children under the age of 18 living with them, 69.0% were married couples living together, 5.2% had a female householder with no husband present, and 21.6% were non-families. 17.7% of all households were made up of individuals, and 6.2% had someone living alone who was 65 years of age or older. The average household size was 2.59 and the average family size was 2.91.

In the town, the population was spread out, with 25.0% under the age of 18, 5.8% from 18 to 24, 30.1% from 25 to 44, 27.4% from 45 to 64, and 11.7% who were 65 years of age or older. The median age was 40 years. For every 100 females, there were 106.5 males. For every 100 females age 18 and over, there were 106.8 males.

The median income for a household in the town was $46,898, and the median income for a family was $50,676. Males had a median income of $36,914 versus $23,958 for females. The per capita income for the town was $19,025. About 4.2% of families and 4.7% of the population were below the poverty line, including 4.4% of those under age 18 and 2.1% of those age 65 or over.

== Culture ==
Porterfield is home to the annual Porterfield Country Music Festival, a weekend of open-air concerts held every summer which draws both local and nationally known country music artists such as Johnny Cash, Charlie Daniels, Crystal Gayle, Merle Haggard, and Loretta Lynn.

Artists who appeared at the 2005 Porterfield Country Music Festival included: Juice Newton, The Oak Ridge Boys, SHeDaisy, Glen Campbell, Sugarland, and Trick Pony.

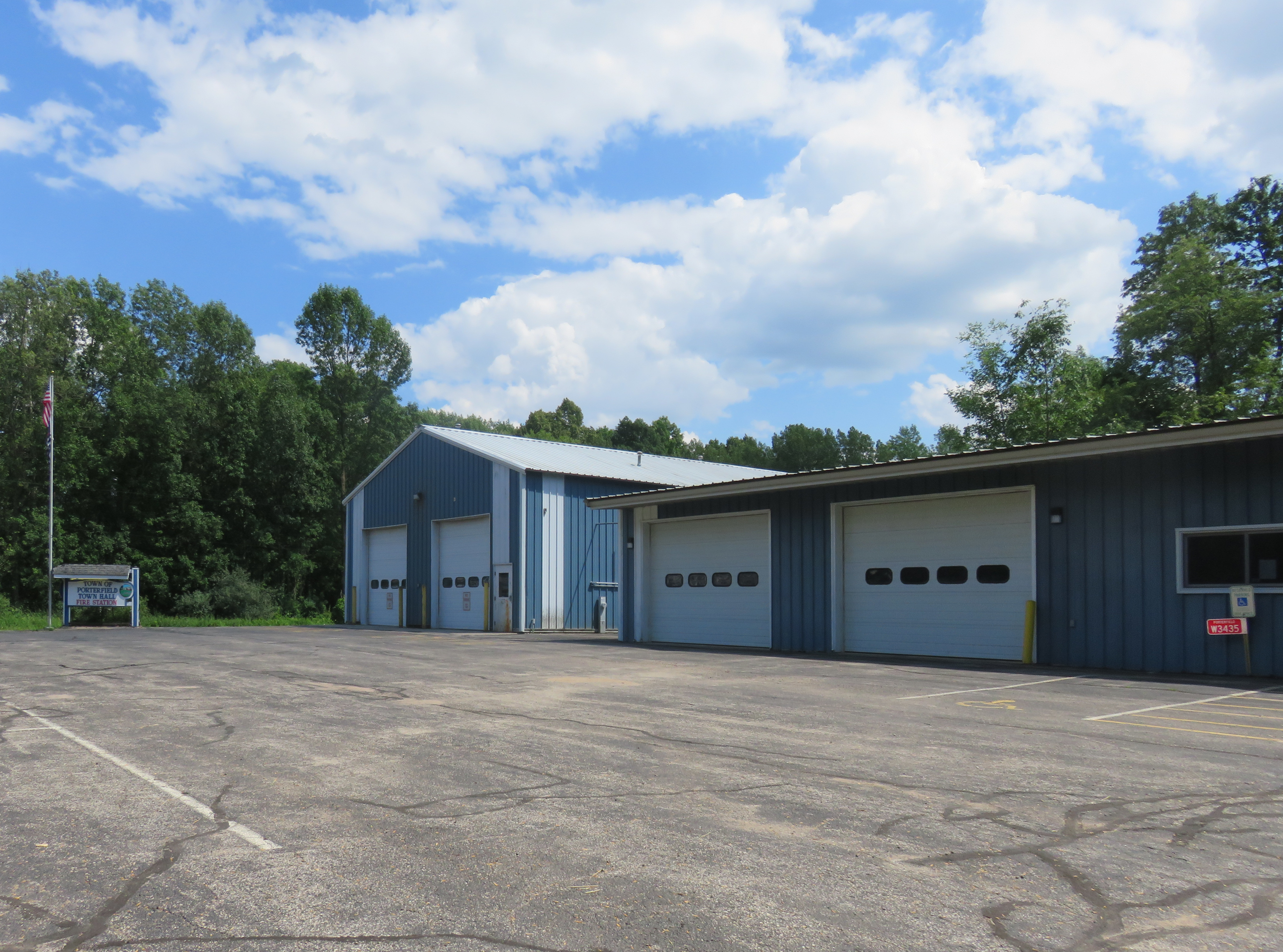
Porterfield town hall and fire station in Walsh

== Notable people ==
- Stan Gruszynski (born 1949), politician

== See also ==
- List of towns in Wisconsin
