= James Bonk =

American educator (1931–2013)

- Born: February 6, 1931; Menominee, Michigan, US
- Died: March 15, 2013 (aged 82); Durham, North Carolina, US
- Education: Carroll College; Ohio State University
- Awards: Duke University Medal 2011
- Scientific career
- Workplaces: Duke University primarily
- Website: fds.duke.edu/db/aas/Chemistry/faculty/james.bonk

James Frederick Bonk (February 6, 1931 – March 15, 2013) was an American university professor noted for eschewing a research career in favor of teaching introductory chemistry courses for over 50 years, primarily at Duke University. He did, however, also teach advanced and graduate courses, and wrote his own textbooks and laboratory manuals. His students fondly labeled his main chemistry class Bonkistry.

== Education and career ==
Bonk obtained a B.S. in Chemistry in 1953 from Carroll College (Waukesha, Wisconsin). He obtained a Ph.D. in chemistry in 1958 from Ohio State University.

While a graduate student at Ohio State University, he received a DuPont Lecturing Fellowship that enabled him to teach there and to coordinate the teaching of introductory chemistry classes at OSU's branch campuses. He also taught summers at Muskingum College.

In 1959 he joined the Department of Chemistry at Duke University as an assistant professor and rose to the rank of full professor.

Bonk was known for his sense of humor. One oft-repeated story regarding him is that a group of students went out of town for a party and got back late, telling Bonk that they were delayed by a flat tire and thus missed an exam. Bonk reportedly told them they could take a makeup exam the next day. When they came for the makeup exam, the students were each put in a different room. The first question on the exam was reputedly a straightforward question worth 5 points. The story goes that the second question, on the next page, was worth 95 points and said "Which Tire?" This version of events is listed on Snopes as an embellished and unproveable story possibly based on a real incident, and the entry includes a 1996 letter from Bonk stating that the story had been embellished and he could not remember the exact details of what really happened; Bonk reiterated in 2001 that the story had been embellished, and added that he would never place that much emphasis on a trick question.

Bonk was also known for his love of tennis, and he played the sport throughout his life. The Duke University tennis teams recognized his many years of service by officially naming Court Number 3 at Ambler Tennis Stadium as "Bonk Court" in 2011. This interest in sports and fitness came in handy when a student tried to hit his face with a pie in 1975. Bonk frequently recounted the story of spryly leaping aside so that the pie got him in the shoulder, and then charging after the perpetrator, who ran out the classroom door and into the neighboring woods. Bonk’s fitness allowed him to keep pace with the much younger student as they ran around in the woods until, in Bonk’s words, "the young man made a tactical error by jumping down into a stream." At that point he was no longer able to evade Bonk, who demanded his Duke University identification. The story was picked up by the Associated Press and garnered national attention.

== Personal life and death ==
Bonk was born February 6, 1931, in Menominee, Michigan, the son of Joseph Frank Bond and Beatrice (Colburn) Bond. He died March 15, 2013, in Durham, North Carolina. A memorial service was held at Duke Chapel on March 21, 2013. Also on March 21, 2013, his ashes were interred in the Sarah P. Duke Memorial Gardens on the Duke campus.

== Awards ==
Bonk received numerous awards:

- The David and Janet Brooks Teaching Award at Duke University in 2001.
- Dean's Distinguished Service Award at Duke University in 2010
- The University Medal at Duke University in 2011
