= Menominee Crack =

Unexplained geologic phenomenon that appeared sudeenin 2010 in Menominee, Michigan

The Menominee Crack is an unusual geological pop-up feature that was created rapidly one morning in October 2010. Located in Menominee, Michigan the crack stretches through the woods, is 361 feet long, over half a meter wide in some places, and up to 1.7 meters deep. In 2013, a group of Michigan Tech researchers led by Joshua Richardson began research on the crack. The researchers concluded that the crack is the first recorded example of such a popup without an obvious trigger. A description and analysis of the event is published in Seismological Research Letters.
