= Leonard J. Umnus =

American sports coach (1903–1996)

Biographical details
- Born: April 18, 1903; Menominee, Michigan, U.S.
- Died: April 13, 1996 (aged 92); Watertown, Wisconsin, U.S.

Playing career

Football
- 1922–1924: Illinois
- Position: Center

Coaching career (HC unless noted)

Football
- 1925–1927: Fairmount/Wichita
- 1929: Illinois (freshmen line)
- 1930: Tracy HS (CA)
- 1932–1933: Jordan
- 1935–1970: Northwestern (WI)

Basketball
- 1925–1928: Fairmount/Wichita

Baseball
- 1930: Tracy HS (CA)

Track and field
- 1925–1928: Fairmount

Administrative career (AD unless noted)
- 1925–1928: Fairmount

Accomplishments and honors

Awards
- Wisconsin Football Coaches Hall of Fame; Upper Peninsula Sports Hall of Fame (2010)

Leonard John Umnus (April 18, 1903 – April 13, 1996) was an American football, basketball, and baseball coach and athletics administrator. He served as the head football coach at Fairmont College (now known as Wichita State University) in Wichita, Kansas from 1925 to 1927, Jordan College in Menominee, Michigan from 1932 to 1933, and Northwestern College (later merge into Martin Luther College) in Watertown, Wisconsin from 1935 to 1970.

== Playing career ==
Umnus enrolled at the University of Illinois in the fall of 1921. While at Illinois he played football with Red Grange under coach Robert Zuppke. Umnus was awarded "letters" for three years as a center and guard. He also was awarded athletic letters for Illinois in boxing.

== Coaching career ==
In 1925, Umnus was hired as the athletic director at Fairmont College—now known as Wichita State University—in Wichita, Kansas, succeeding Sam H. Hill. He served as the head football coach at the school from 1925 to 1927, compiling a record of 12–7–4. He also coached the basketball team for three seasons, tallying a mark of 47–14.

In 1929, Umnus returned to his alma mater, Illinois, as line coach for the freshman football team, assistant Carl M. Voyles, head coach of the freshman team. He earned a master's degree of the University of Iowa, and in late 1929, he was hired as athletic coach and physical education director at Tracy High School in Tracy, California, a position he took up in early 1930. That spring, Tracy was retained for the 1930–31 school year. in 1932, Umnus was appointed head athletic coach at Jordan College in Menominee, Michigan. He resigned from his post at Jordan College in 1934.

Umnus later coached at Northwestern College in Watertown, Wisconsin, which was later merged into Martin Luther College in New Ulm, Minnesota. He was the head football coach at the school for 35 seasons and his teams produced a record of 135–64–9. At Northwestern, he coached all sports including baseball, basketball, tennis, and wrestling.

== Death ==
Umnus died in 1996.

== Head coaching record ==
=== College football ===
Year	Team	Overall	Conference	Standing	Bowl/playoffs
Fairmount Wheatshockers / Wichita Shockers (Kansas Collegiate Athletic Conference) (1925–1927)
1925	Fairmount	3–1–4	3–0–4	3rd	
1926	Wichita	6–2	5–1	4th	
1927	Wichita	3–4	2–4	T–10th	
Fairmount/Wichita:		12–7–4	10–5–4		
Jordan (Independent) (1932–1933)
1932	Jordan				
1933	Jordan				
Jordan:					
Northwestern Trojans (Tri-State Intercollegiate / Badger State Intercollegiate / Badger-Illini Conference) (1935–1956)
1935	Northwestern	4–2–1	3–1–1	T–2nd	
1936	Northwestern	3–3	2–3	4th	
1937	Northwestern	5–2		1st	
1938	Northwestern	4–2		1st	
1939	Northwestern	3–1–2			
1940	Northwestern	2–4			
1941	Northwestern	5–1–1		T–1st	
1942	Northwestern	3–2	3–1	T–1st	
1943	No team–World War II				
1944	No team–World War II				
1945	Northwestern	5–1			
1946	Northwestern	3–2–1	2–0–1	1st	
1947	Northwestern	5–2	3–1	T–1st	
1948	Northwestern	6–2	5–1	T–1st	
1949	Northwestern	3–4	3–4	5th	
1950	Northwestern	5–1	5–1	2nd	
1951	Northwestern	6–0–1	6–0–1	1st	
1952	Northwestern			1st	
1953	Northwestern			1st	
1954	Northwestern			1st	
1955	Northwestern	6–1	5–1	T–1st	
1956	Northwestern		3–2	T–2nd	
Northwestern Trojans (Badger-Gopher Conference) (1957–1961)
1957	Northwestern				
1958	Northwestern				
1959	Northwestern				
1960	Northwestern				
1961	Northwestern				
Northwestern Trojans (Gateway Conference) (1962–1970)
1962	Northwestern		1–2	4th	
1963	Northwestern		3–1	1st	
1964	Northwestern	4–2	3–1	2nd	
1965	Northwestern	6–1	4–0	1sts	
1966	Northwestern	3–5	2–1	2nd	
1967	Northwestern	1–7	1–3	4th	
1968	Northwestern		1–3	4th	
1969	Northwestern		1–3	T–3rd	
1970	Northwestern		1–3	4th	
Northwestern:		135–64–9			
Total:					
National championship Conference title Conference division title or championship game berth
