= Marshall B. Lloyd =

American inventor (1858–1927)

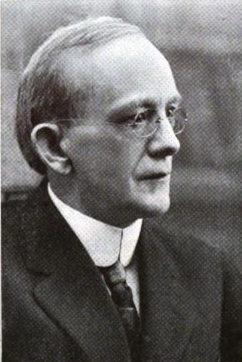
Lloyd c. 1920

Marshall Burns Lloyd (March 10, 1858 – August 10, 1927) was an American inventor and manufacturer, best known for inventing the Lloyd Loom which was used for making a popular style of furniture and baby carriages. He also was noted for filing patents for the production of steel tubing which he sold for $800,000, a substantial amount at the time. Lloyd sold his loom patents for 3 million dollars in the 1920s. Lloyd held about 200 patents.
