= Menominee, Michigan =

City in and the county seat of Menominee County, Michigan, United States

Menominee, Michigan Menekaunee (Menominee)
- City
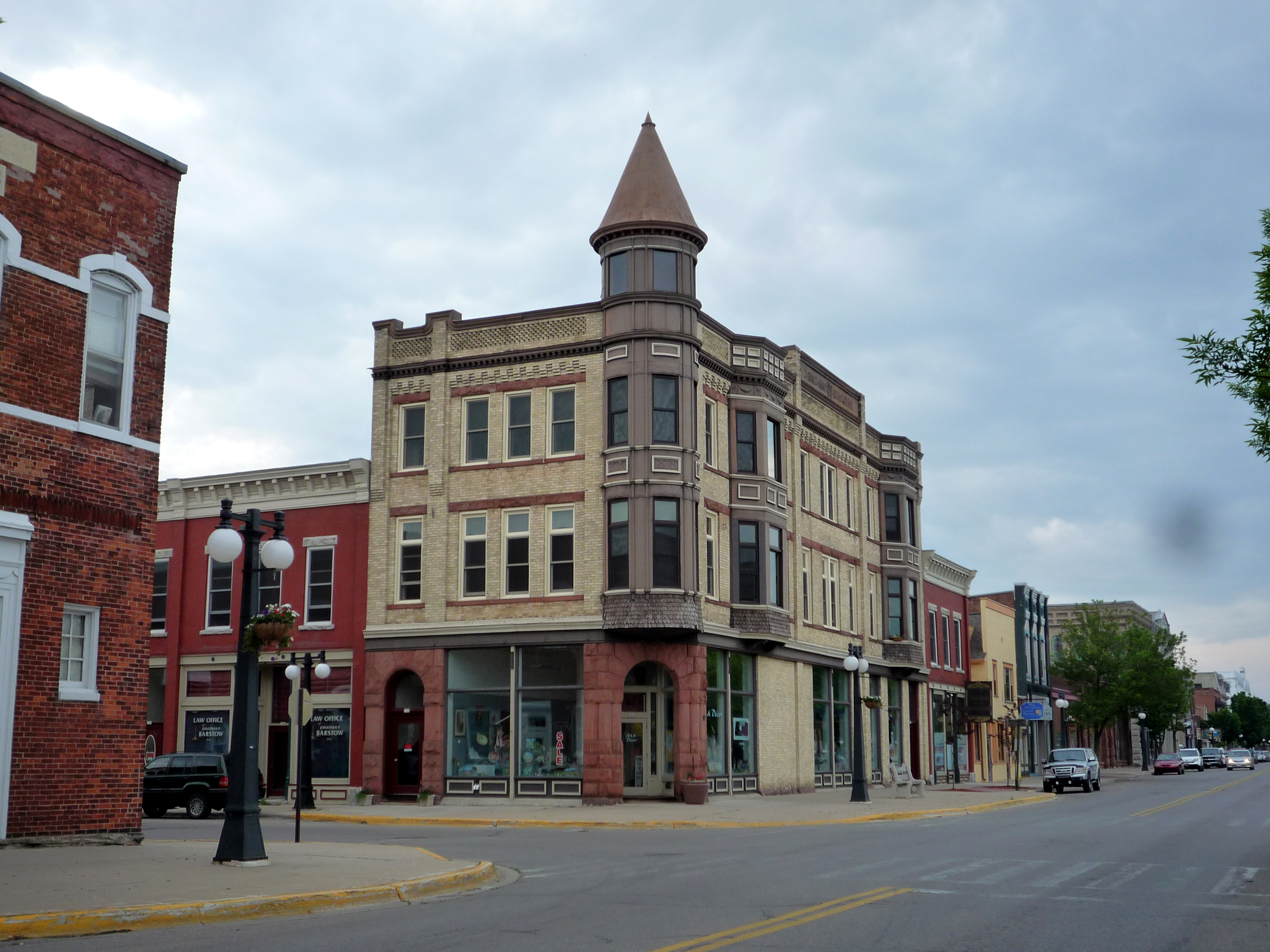
- First Street Historic District
- Interactive map of Menominee, Michigan
- Location within Michigan Location within the United States
- Coordinates: 45°06′28″N 87°36′51″W
- Country: United States
- State: Michigan
- County: Menominee

Government
  - Mayor: Casey Hoffman

Area
  - Total: 5.49 sq mi (14.22 km^{2})
  - Land: 5.16 sq mi (13.37 km^{2})
  - Water: 0.33 sq mi (0.85 km^{2})
- Elevation: 594 ft (181 m)

Population (2020)
  - Total: 8,488
  - Density: 1,644.0/sq mi (634.74/km^{2})
- Time zone: UTC-6 (CST)
  - Summer (DST): UTC-5 (CDT)
- ZIP Code: 49858
- Area code: 906
- FIPS code: 26-53020
- GNIS feature ID: 0632104
- Website: www.menominee.us

Menominee (/məˈnɒməni/ mə-NOM-ə-nee; Menominee: Menekaunee) is a city in Menominee County, Michigan, United States, and its county seat. The population was 8,488 at the 2020 census. It is the southernmost city of the Upper Peninsula, on the north bank of the Menominee River at its mouth on Green Bay, part of Lake Michigan. Menominee is the fourth-largest city in the Upper Peninsula, behind Marquette, Sault Ste. Marie, and Escanaba. Menominee Township is located to the north of the city, but is politically autonomous. Menominee is part of the Marinette micropolitan area.

== History ==
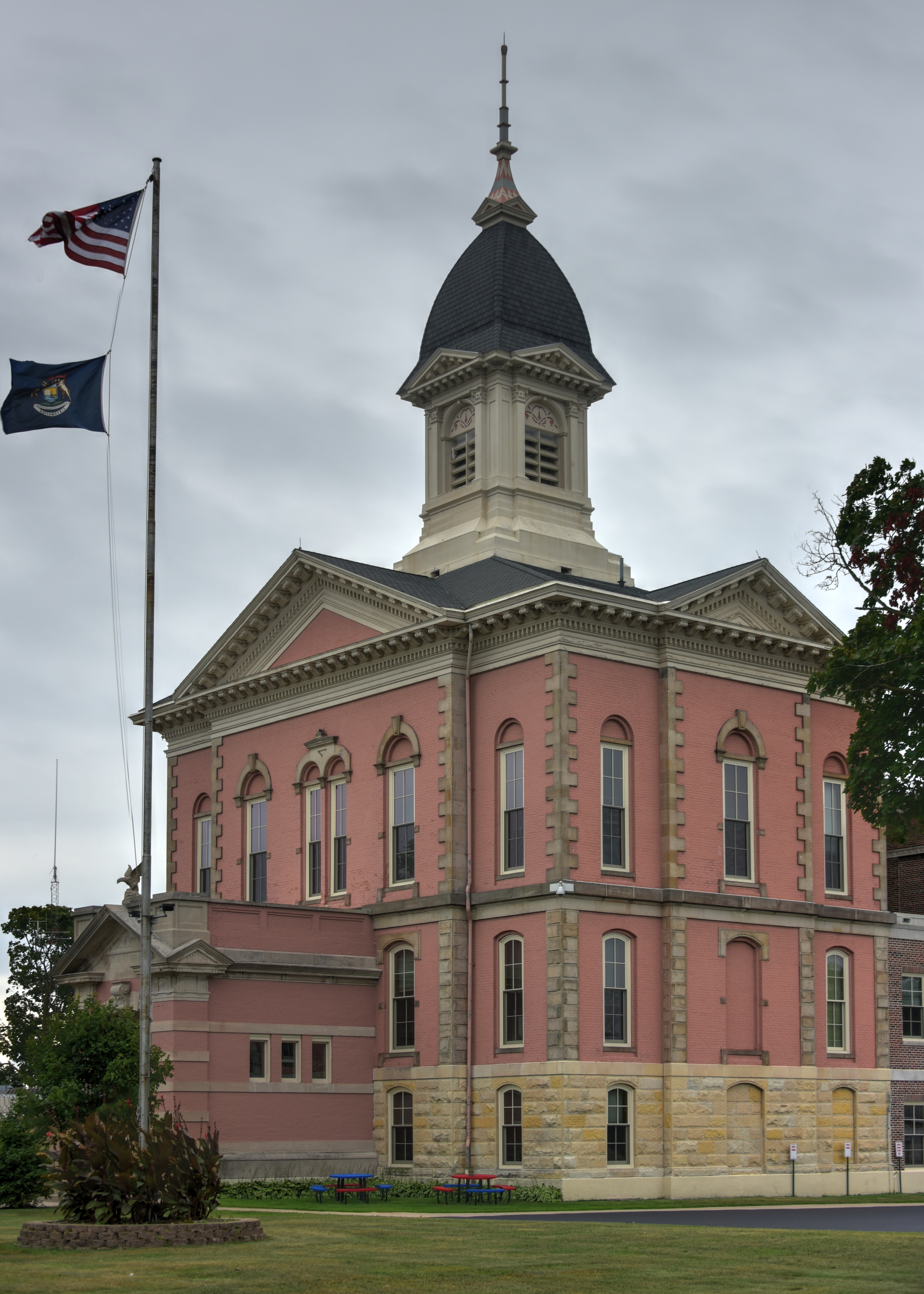
Menominee County Courthouse

In historic times, this area was the traditional territory of the Menominee Indian Tribe. The town of Menominee was named after their English name which roughly translates as "wild rice," a nickname given to them by their Ojibwe neighbors based on their cultivation of wild rice as a staple food. In their own language, they are known as Mamaceqtaw which means simply "the people", and the town of Menominee is known as Menekaunee (sometimes spelled Menīkāneh), which means "at the good village". They were removed to west of the Mississippi River and now have a reservation along the Wolf River in North Central Wisconsin after ceding their territory to the United States in the 1836 Treaty of the Cedars.

Menominee gained prominence in the 19th century as a lumber town; in its heyday, it produced more lumber than any other city in the United States of America. During this time of prosperity, the Menominee Opera House was built. It is being restored. In the 1910s, a cycle car, the "Dudly Bug", was manufactured in Menominee. In the waning years of lumber production, local business interests, interested in diversifying Menominee's manufacturing base, attracted inventor Marshall Burns Lloyd and his Minneapolis company Lloyd Manufacturing, which made wicker baby buggies. In 1917, Lloyd invented an automated process for weaving wicker and manufactured it as the Lloyd Loom. This machine process is still in use today. In the 21st century, the economy of Menominee is based on manufacturing (paper products, wicker lawn furniture, and auto supplies) and tourism.

In 1940, during the "Vote for Gracie" publicity stunt in which comedian Gracie Allen ran for president, she was nominated for mayor of Menominee, but was disqualified because she was not a resident of the city.

=== Sports ===
The Menominee Maroons won the state high school championship in its division for basketball in 1967 and football in 1998, 2006, 2007, and 2025. In the 2006 season, the Maroons finished unbeaten and only allowed 38 points scored against them but their offense scored 513 points in that entire season. They beat the former Wisconsin and Minnesota Division One state champions. Menominee shares a historic high school football rivalry with neighbor Marinette, Wisconsin. The two have conducted the third-longest rivalry in the nation.

Menominee, like most good-sized towns, embraced the newly emerging 19th-century sport of football. A local group took the name of North End Athletic Club and, under manager McPhaul, were the visiting opponent for the newly formed Green Bay team sponsored by the Indian Packing Co. led by captain Curly Lambeau. The Indian Co. Packers of Green Bay defeated the N.E.A.C. Colts of Menominee 53–0 at Hagemeister Field.

== Geography ==
According to the United States Census Bureau, the city has a total area of 5.48 square miles (14.19 km^{2}), of which 5.15 square miles (13.34 km^{2}) is land and 0.33 square miles (0.85 km^{2}) is water. It is the southernmost city and location in Michigan's Upper Peninsula.

Menominee has a cairn marking the halfway point between the North Pole and the Equator. This is slightly north of the 45th parallel north, due to the flattening of the earth at the poles. This is one of six Michigan sites and 29 places in the U.S.A. where such signs are known to exist.

Menominee, Michigan, is also the site of the Menominee Crack, an unusual geological feature that formed spontaneously in 2010.

=== Climate ===
This climatic region is typified by large seasonal temperature differences, with warm to hot (and often humid) summers and cold (sometimes severely cold) winters. According to the Köppen Climate Classification system, Menominee has a humid continental climate, abbreviated "Dfb" on climate maps.

Climate data for Menonimee, Michigan
Month	Jan	Feb	Mar	Apr	May	Jun	Jul	Aug	Sep	Oct	Nov	Dec	Year
Mean daily maximum °F (°C)	27 (−3)	30 (−1)	39 (4)	52 (11)	65 (18)	75 (24)	80 (27)	78 (26)	70 (21)	56 (13)	43 (6)	31 (−1)	54 (12)
Mean daily minimum °F (°C)	11 (−12)	13 (−11)	22 (−6)	33 (1)	45 (7)	55 (13)	59 (15)	58 (14)	50 (10)	39 (4)	28 (−2)	18 (−8)	36 (2)
Average precipitation inches (mm)	0.43 (11)	0.16 (4.1)	0.51 (13)	1.13 (29)	1.46 (37)	1.5 (38)	1.48 (38)	1.33 (34)	1.39 (35)	1.23 (31)	0.81 (21)	0.39 (9.9)	11.82 (300)

== Demographics ==
Historical population
Census	Pop.	Note	%±
1870	1,597		—
1880	3,288		105.9%
1890	10,630		223.3%
1900	12,818		20.6%
1910	10,507		−18.0%
1920	8,907		−15.2%
1930	10,320		15.9%
1940	10,230		−0.9%
1950	11,151		9.0%
1960	11,289		1.2%
1970	10,748		−4.8%
1980	10,099		−6.0%
1990	9,398		−6.9%
2000	9,131		−2.8%
2010	8,599		−5.8%
2020	8,488		−1.3%
U.S. Decennial Census

=== 2020 census ===
As of the 2020 census, Menominee had a population of 8,488. The median age was 44.5 years. 19.1% of residents were under the age of 18 and 22.8% of residents were 65 years of age or older. For every 100 females there were 101.2 males, and for every 100 females age 18 and over there were 97.9 males age 18 and over.

98.2% of residents lived in urban areas, while 1.8% lived in rural areas.

There were 4,101 households in Menominee, of which 21.5% had children under the age of 18 living in them. Of all households, 35.3% were married-couple households, 26.1% were households with a male householder and no spouse or partner present, and 30.6% were households with a female householder and no spouse or partner present. About 41.7% of all households were made up of individuals and 19.0% had someone living alone who was 65 years of age or older.

There were 4,462 housing units, of which 8.1% were vacant. The homeowner vacancy rate was 1.4% and the rental vacancy rate was 5.4%.

Racial composition as of the 2020 census
Race	Number	Percentage
White	7,799	91.9%
Black or African American	89	1.0%
American Indian and Alaska Native	72	0.8%
Asian	48	0.6%
Native Hawaiian and Other Pacific Islander	0	0.0%
Some other race	81	1.0%
Two or more races	399	4.7%
Hispanic or Latino (of any race)	271	3.2%

=== 2010 census ===
As of the census of 2010, there were 8,599 people, 3,987 households, and 2,311 families living in the city. The population density was 1,669.7 inhabitants per square mile (644.7/km^{2}). There were 4,456 housing units at an average density of 865.2 per square mile (334.1/km^{2}). The racial makeup of the city was 96.7% White, 0.4% African American, 0.9% Native American, 0.5% Asian, 0.2% from other races, and 1.2% from two or more races. Hispanic or Latino of any race were 1.4% of the population.

There were 3,987 households, of which 26.3% had children under the age of 18 living with them, 40.0% were married couples living together, 12.6% had a female householder with no spouse present, 5.4% had a male householder with no spouse present, and 42.0% were non-families. 37.1% of all households were made up of individuals, and 14.5% had someone living alone who was 65 years of age or older. The average household size was 2.13 and the average family size was 2.74.

The median age in the city was 44 years. 21.8% of residents were under the age of 18; 7% were between the ages of 18 and 24; 22.7% were from 25 to 44; 30.3% were from 45 to 64; and 18.3% were 65 years of age or older. The gender makeup of the city was 48.7% male and 51.3% female.

=== 2000 census ===
As of the census of 2000, there were 9,131 people, 4,063 households, and 2,441 families living in the city. The population density was 1,763.2 inhabitants per square mile (680.8/km^{2}). There were 4,393 housing units at an average density of 848.3 per square mile (327.5/km^{2}). The racial makeup of the city was 97.35% White, 0.14% African American, 0.82% Native American, 0.32% Asian, 0.27% from other races, and 1.10% from two or more races. Hispanic or Latino of any race were 1.12% of the population. 31.6% were of German, 9.3% French, 8.7% Swedish, 8.7% Polish, 7.2% Irish and 6.7% French Canadian ancestry according to Census 2000.

There were 4,063 households, out of which 27.9% had children under the age of 18 living with them, 43.6% were married couples living together, 12.4% had a female householder with no husband present, and 39.9% were non-families. 35.3% of all households were made up of individuals, and 15.0% had someone living alone who was 65 years of age or older. The average household size was 2.22 and the average family size was 2.86.

In the city, the population was spread out, with 23.9% under the age of 18, 9.4% from 18 to 24, 25.8% from 25 to 44, 22.8% from 45 to 64, and 18.2% who were 65 years of age or older. The median age was 39 years. For every 100 females, there were 92.8 males. For every 100 females age 18 and over, there were 90.4 males.

The median income for a household in the city was $30,523, and the median income for a family was $38,867. Males had a median income of $32,850 versus $22,145 for females. The per capita income for the city was $17,500. About 9.9% of families and 13.3% of the population were below the poverty line, including 18.2% of those under age 18 and 11.9% of those age 65 or over.

== Economy ==
The greater Menominee area is home to a variety of industries, including shipbuilding, auto parts, chemicals, helicopter design and construction, airplane components, health care, and paper-making. In good financial times, some local companies have reported a shortage of skilled workers.

Menominee is also the headquarters and manufacturing plant of Enstrom Helicopter Corporation, a US helicopter manufacturer. Enstrom manufactures its F-28F & F-280FX piston helicopters and its 480B turbine helicopter in Menominee.

== Arts and culture ==
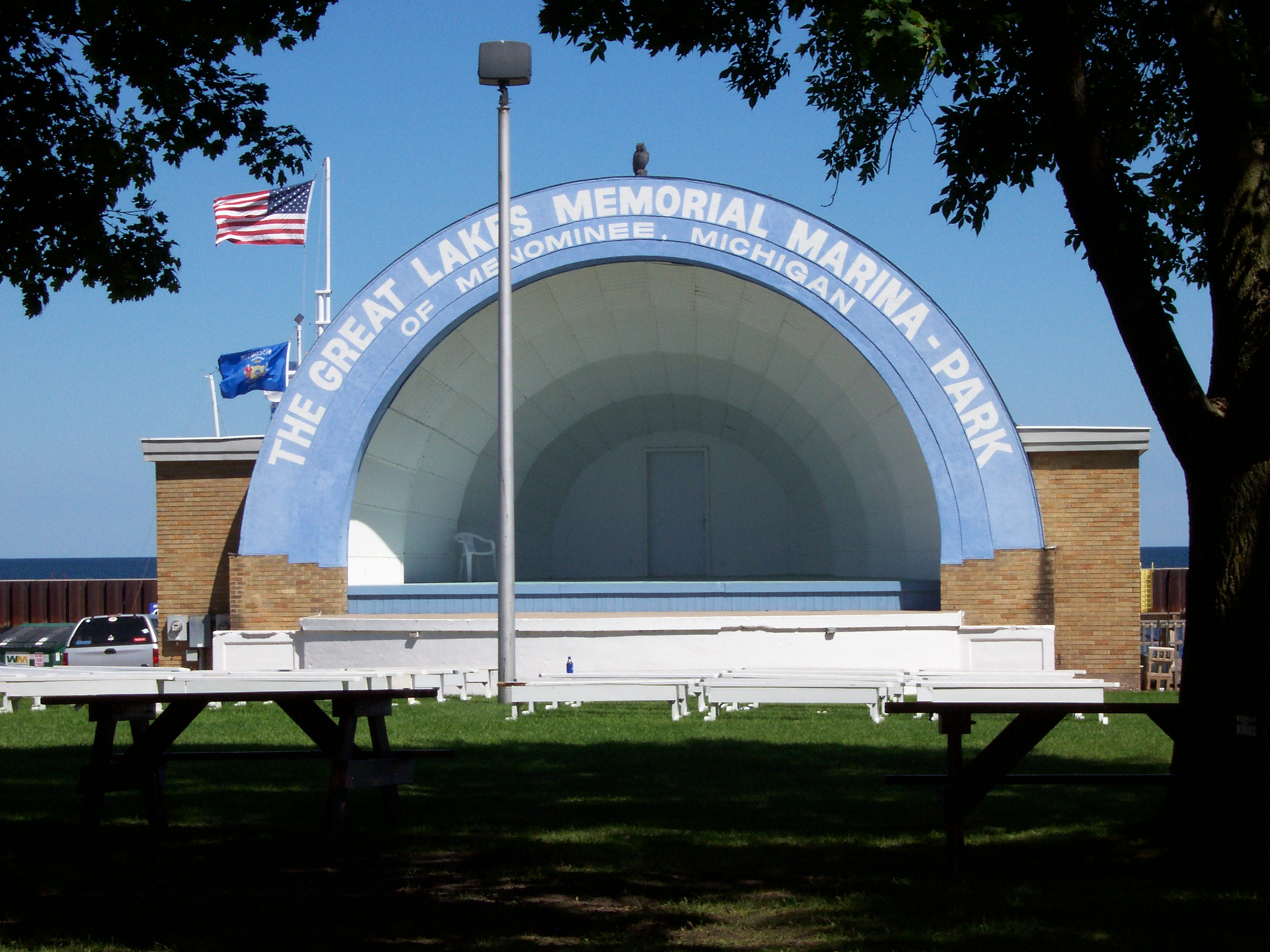
Bandshell

Much of Menominee's L-shaped downtown runs along the shores of the bay of Green Bay and includes the Great Lakes Memorial Marina and park. Many of the downtown buildings in the First Street Historic District, built at the end of the 19th century or the beginning of the 20th, have been restored. They now provide space for several upscale restaurants, gift shops, beauty salons and day spas, antique shops, galleries, and a variety of essential services. The Menominee Bandshell is a focal point for concerts, an art show, a car show and a four-day community festival.

== Parks and recreation ==
Menominee's waterfront is the setting for public events in the summer, including a city-sponsored festival. The Marinette Menominee Area Chamber of Commerce coordinates a concert series held on Thursdays from late June to mid-August. The Cabela Master Walleye Circuit brought hundreds of fishermen and women to the area for tournaments in 2005, 2008 and 2009. Menominee Pierhead Light Station is located here. The National Historic Places Register Reference Number is 05000738.

== Government ==
Beginning in January 2012, the mayor of Menominee was Jean Stegeman, who held the office until January 2024. In November 2023, Mayor Stegeman was narrowly defeated by her challenger, Casey Hoffman. Hoffman took office as mayor in January 2024. Hoffman made history in the city by being the first openly gay GOP member to win the mayor seat, and one of the first in the state

Since November 2021, the city manager has been Brett J Botbyl .

== Education ==
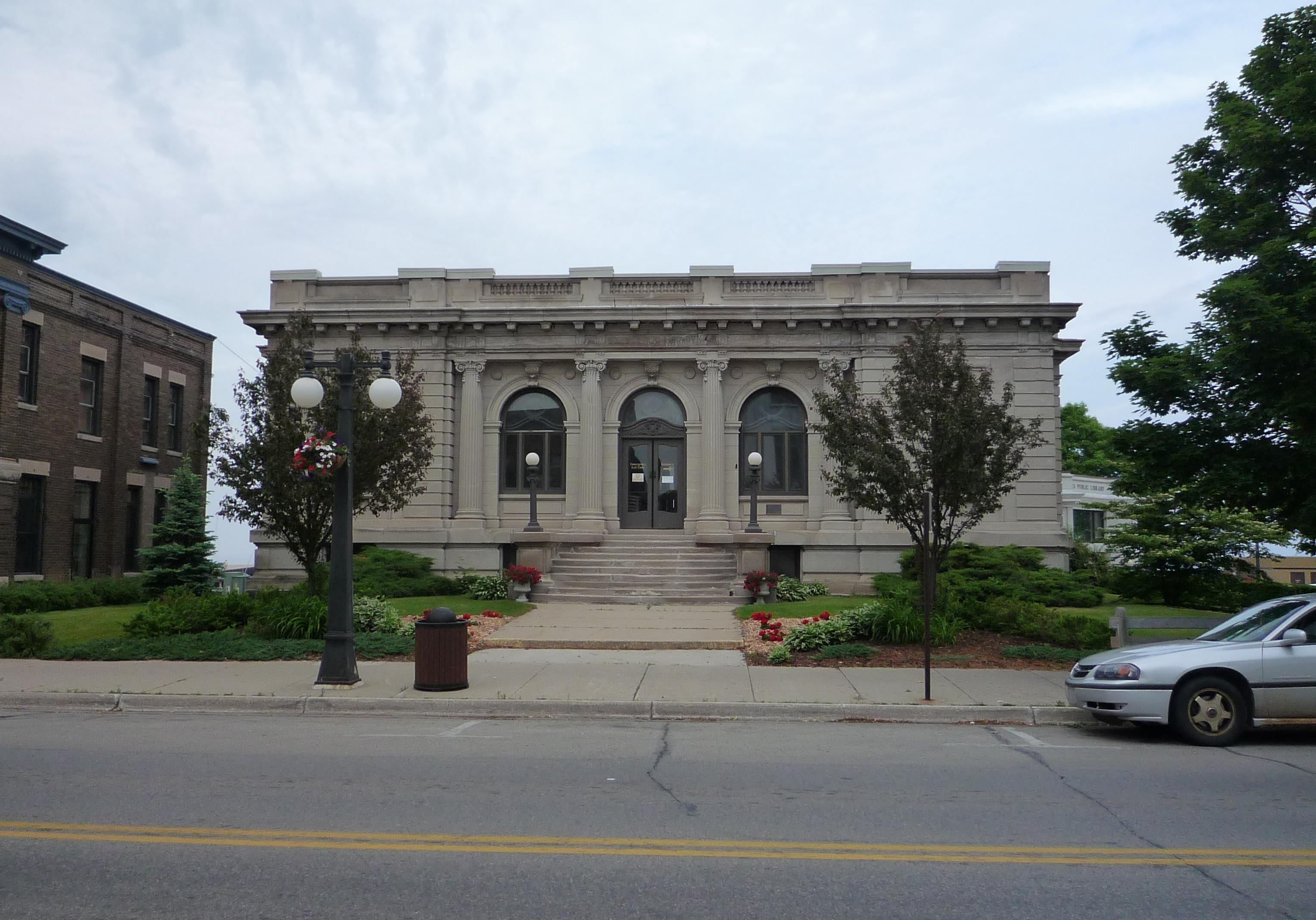
Spies Public Library is on the waterfront in downtown Menominee.

The school district is Menominee Area Public Schools.

In 1918 the school district withdrew its German courses and set its German textbooks on fire.

== Transportation ==
=== Ground transportation ===
Several highways connect through the Menominee area:

- US 41 connects with Escanaba and Marquette to the north and Marinette, Wisconsin and Green Bay, Wisconsin to the south.
- M-35 runs northeast to provide a more direct route to Escanaba along the shore of Lake Michigan's Green Bay.
- WIS 64 starts just across the state line in Marinette and travels westerly.
- WIS 180 starts just across the state line in Marinette and travels northerly and then westerly.

Indian Trails bus lines operates daily intercity bus service between Hancock and Milwaukee, Wisconsin, with a stop in Menominee.

=== Airport ===
Menominee is serviced by the Menominee-Marinette Twin County Airport (KMNM)

=== Car ferries ===
Ann Arbor Railroad ran cross-Lake Michigan car ferries from Betsie Lake, Elberta, Michigan, to Menominee starting in 1894, and also connected railcar freight with the Wisconsin & Michigan Railway until 1938 or some time after. In January 1970 the Interstate Commerce Commission authorized the Ann Arbor Railroad to abandon this service.

The location of the Ann Arbor car ferry slip in Lighthouse Ann Arbor Park has been converted to a boat launch.

=== Railroad ===
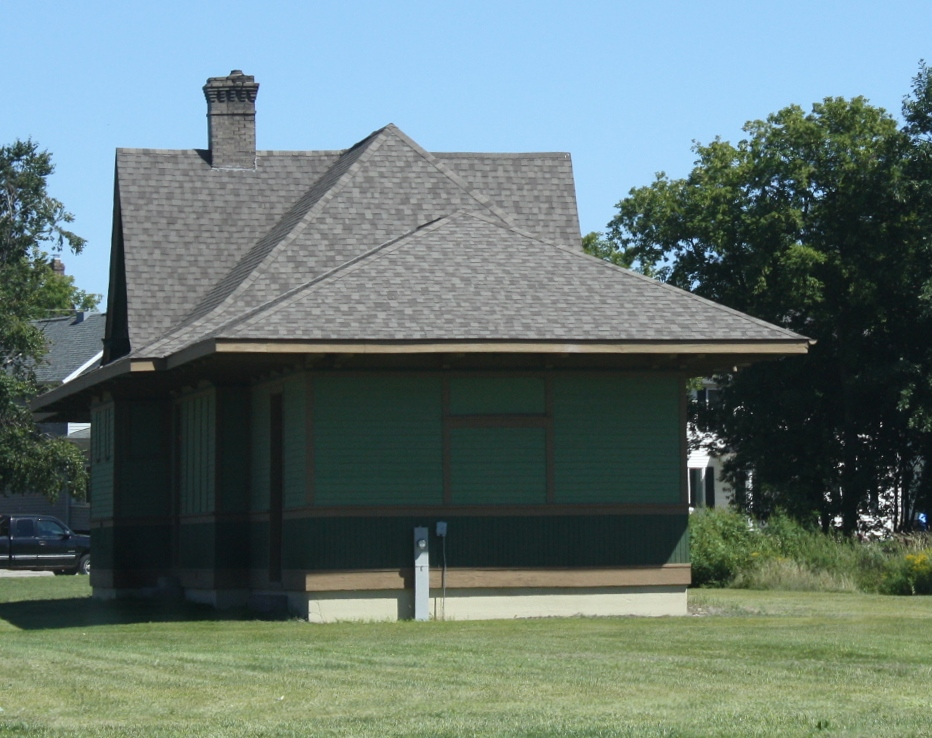
Menominee Michigan Railroad Station

Currently, railroad lines serving the twin cities only offer freight service as provided by the Escanaba and Lake Superior Railroad.

The Milwaukee Road railroad began passenger service to Menominee station in 1903. That year the railroad constructed a rail passenger depot on Fourth Avenue, running frequent trips between Menominee and Ellis Junction (now Crivitz). It shared the station tracks with the Wisconsin & Michigan Railway. Passenger ridership dropped significantly by 1920 causing the Milwaukee Road to abandon service to the Menominee station in May 1927 and after that closed the station. The Wisconsin and Michigan Railroad continued freight service to 1938.

The Chicago and Northwestern Railroad also had a freight and passenger station on 7th Street . Passenger service to the C&NW station ended on July 16, 1969.

The Milwaukee Road railroad passenger station is located at 219 West Fourth Avenue. The station was built in 1903 originally as a part of the Menominee Branch Railroad Company (chartered July 2, 1883). It is currently under private ownership.

== Relationship with Marinette, Wisconsin ==
Menominee and Marinette, Wisconsin are sometimes described as "twin cities". Menominee shares a hospital, community foundation, newspaper and chamber of commerce with Marinette, and Menominee is part of the Marinette micropolitan area as defined by the Office of Management and Budget. Numerous city groups work together to benefit the entire two-city, two-county and two-state community.

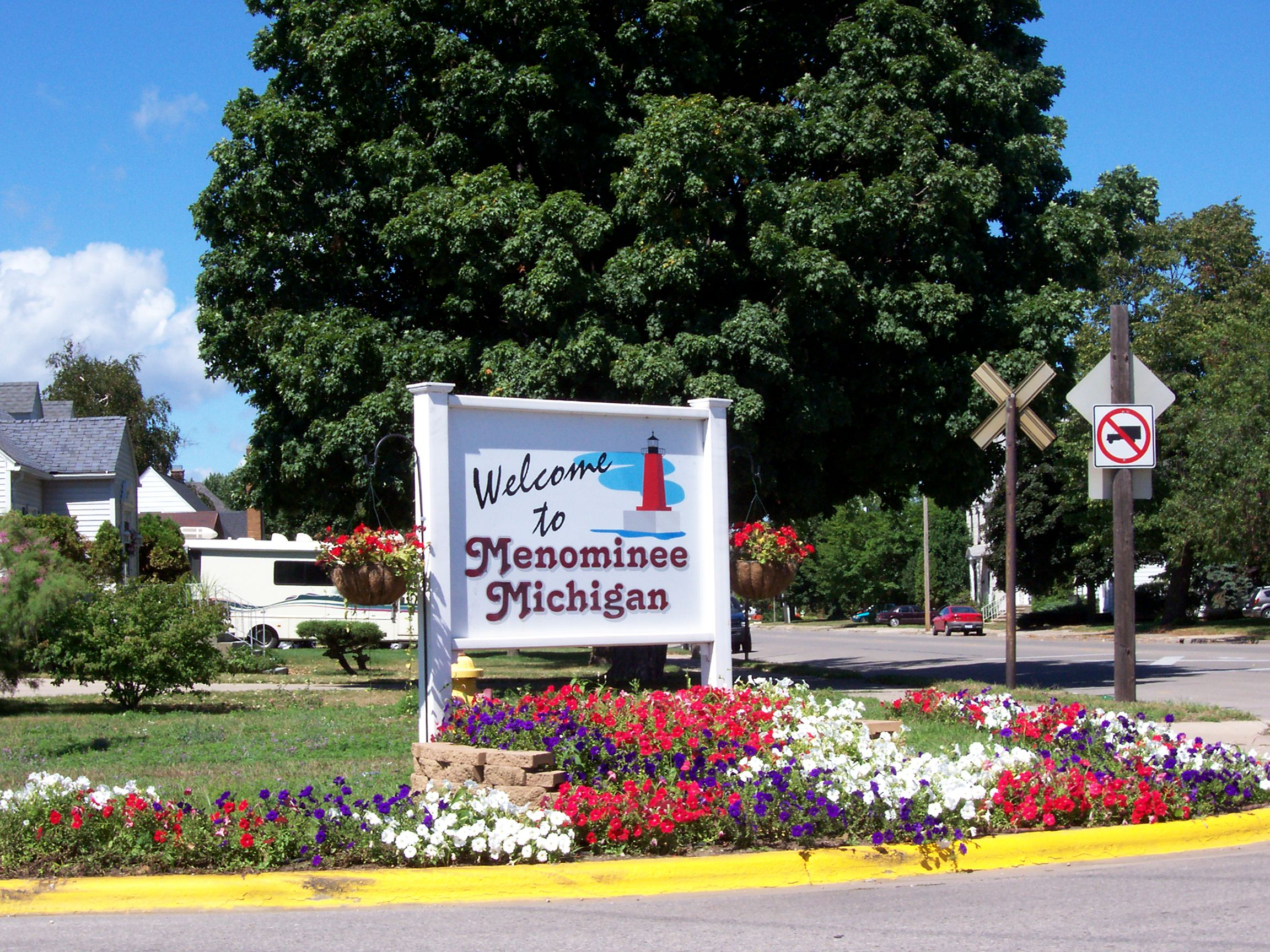
Welcome sign

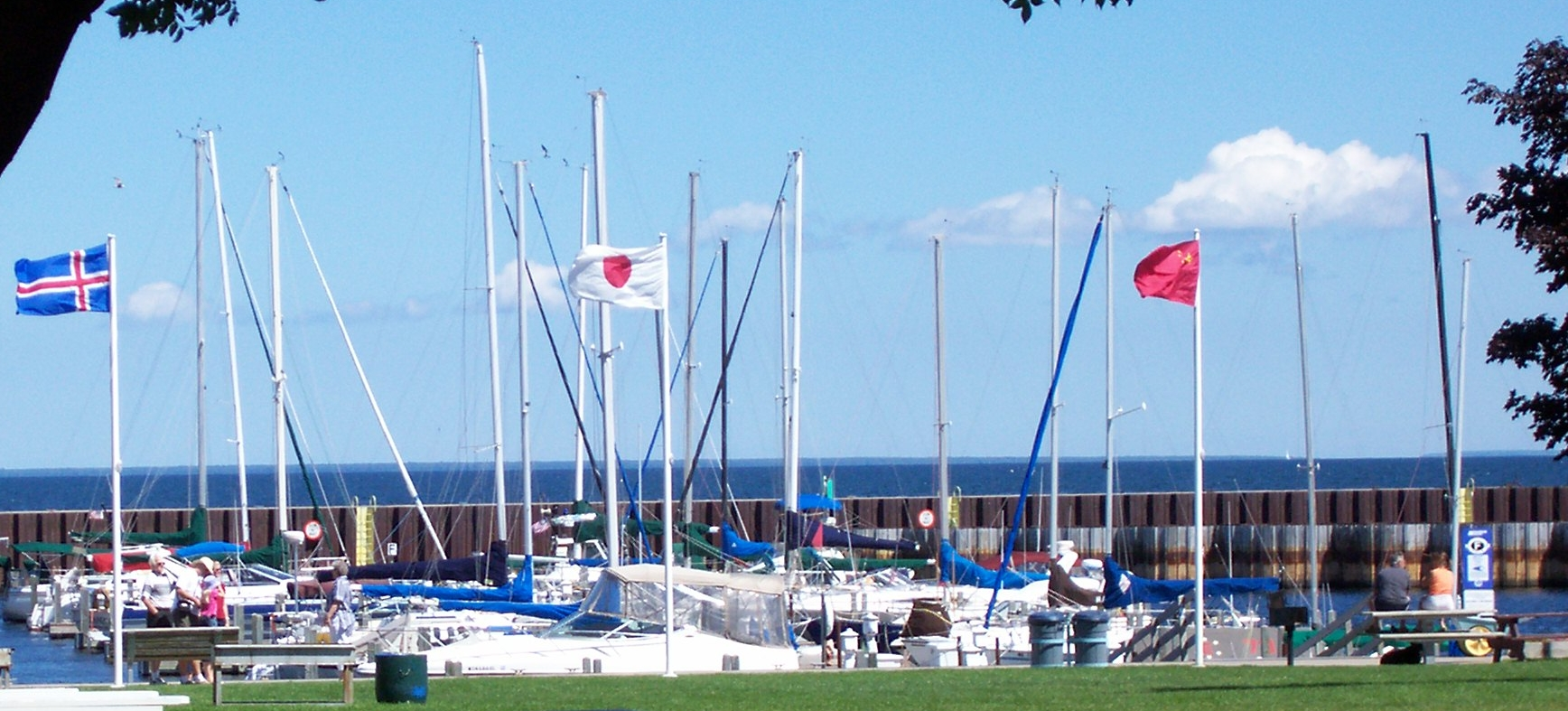
Marina

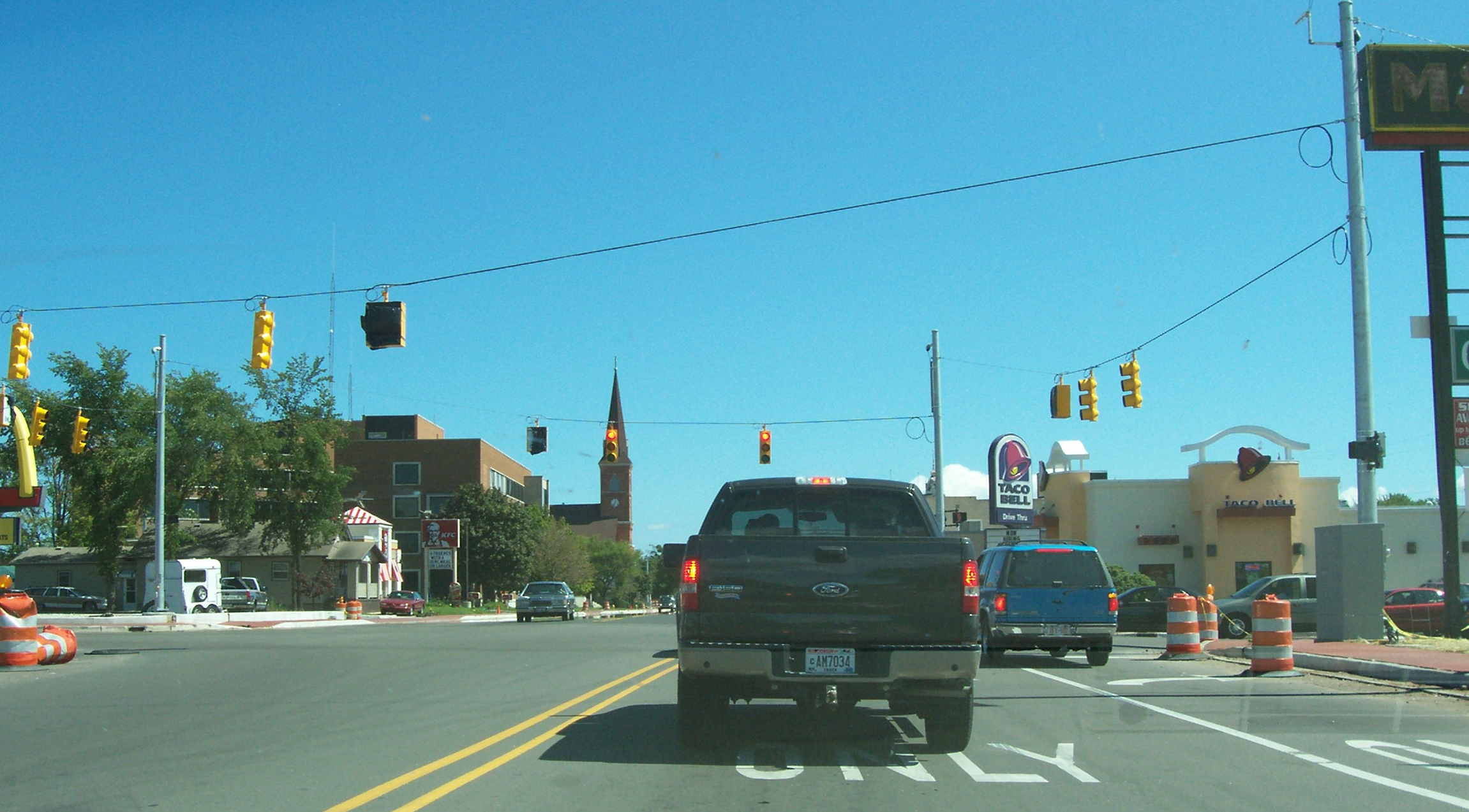
US 41 in Menominee

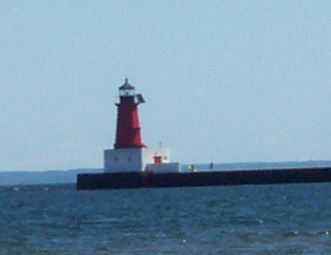
Menominee Pier Light

== Notable people ==
- James Bonk, longtime chemistry professor, Duke University
- Audrey Cleary, North Dakota state legislator
- John O. Henes, businessman and philanthropist
- Lewis L. Johnson, Wisconsin state assemblyman
- Kathleen Kirkham, silent-film actress
- Mitchell Leisen, Hollywood director, art director and costumer designer
- Kent T. Lundgren, pharmacist and Michigan state senator
- Dave Mason, NFL player
- Richard P. Matty, Wisconsin state assemblyman
- John McLean, Olympic silver medal winner
- Alvin H. Nielsen, molecular spectroscopist
- Harald Herborg Nielsen, physicist
- William Nolde, last American soldier killed in Vietnam
- Fred Stephenson Norcross, University of Michigan football captain, coach Oregon State University
- Doris Packer, actress who played Mrs. Rayburn, Theodore Cleaver's principal in the television series Leave It to Beaver
- Bill Rademacher, NFL player, Super Bowl III champion
- Mitzi Shore, owner of The Comedy Store in Los Angeles
- Samuel M. Stephenson, member of United States House of Representatives from Michigan
- Bart Stupak, member of US House of Representatives from Michigan
- Robyn Leigh Tanguay, molecular toxicologist, Oregon State University
- Leonard J. Umnus, college football player and coach

== See also ==
- Interstate Bridge (Marinette, Wisconsin – Menominee, Michigan)
- Menominee Depot webpage
