= Lloyd Loom =

Process of twisting paper around metal wiring used to make popular furniture

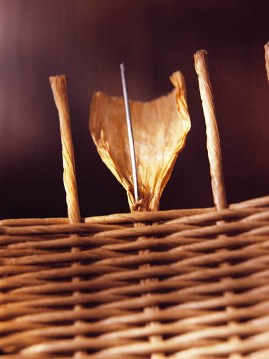
Piece of Lloyd Loom weave

Lloyd Loom is machine-woven wicker created from tightly twisted kraft paper reinforced with wire. The Lloyd Loom process was patented in 1917 by the American Marshall B. Lloyd. Lloyd Loom chairs quickly became very popular in the United States and in 1921, Marshall B. Lloyd sold the British rights to W (William) Lusty & Sons, who used Lloyd Loom wicker to create a range of furniture simpler in design than the American originals.

At the height of its popularity, in the 1930s, Lusty Lloyd Loom furniture could be found in hotels, restaurants and tea rooms, as well as aboard a Zeppelin, cruise ships and ocean-going liners, becoming a household name. The Lusty family developed over one thousand designs, and over ten million pieces of Lusty Lloyd Loom were made in America and Great Britain before 1940.

== Lusty Lloyd Loom ==
William Lusty began in business in 1872 with a hardware shop in London's East End. Specialising in timber products the business benefitted from the demand for ammunition packing cases during the First World War. In May 1920 Frank Lusty sought the British rights to the new Lloyd Loom fabric, having been tipped off by Lusty's New York agent. Full patent rights were acquired in 1921 and the Lustys were in production the following year.

A few years later the Lusty Lloyd Loom factory covered seventeen acres at Bromley-by-Bow in East London and employed over 500 people making a range of products from baby carriages to kitchen cupboards. By 1933 over four hundred designs were featured in the Lusty Lloyd Loom catalogue. The factory was completely destroyed by bombing during the afternoon of 7 September 1940, together with over twenty thousand items of stock; there were no fatalities. The Lustys relaunched their business with a new catalogue in 1951, though post war austerity prevented them achieving the pre-war sales level. The London factory site was eventually sold and the business moved to Martley near Worcester. Production ceased in 1968. Whilst the Lusty family found other interests and pursuits Lloyd Loom production continued in the United States at Menominee until 1982. After a brief hiatus, production resumed in Menominee in 1982 after Flanders Industries purchased the Lloyd Manufacturing works there, forming the Lloyd Flanders company. Lloyd Flanders continues to make Lloyd Loom furniture in Menominee today.

In the 1990s, Geoffrey Lusty, a grandson of founder William Lusty, resumed production by relocating manufacturing to the Far East. In 2008, following difficulties expanding sales in the United Kingdom, the company sought a new owner. W Lusty & Sons was renamed The Lusty Furniture Company in July 2008, and production continued in Indonesia using the company's original designs.

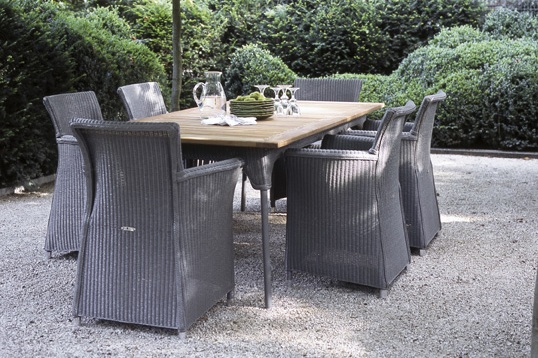
Set of St. Tropez chairs in Lloyd Loom

During the fallow period between 1951 and the late 1990s a raft of commercial furniture producers entered the Lloyd Loom marketplace, such as the now defunct Lloyd Loom of Spalding in the United Kingdom and Vincent Sheppard in Belgium. A number of Lloyd Loom manufacturers and retailers both in the UK and abroad have emerged designing, producing and selling various indoor and outdoor Lloyd Loom product lines. Some manufacturers and retailers have developed synthetic fibres based on the original paper loom - for use in outdoor furniture.

The majority of current worldwide Lloyd Loom production takes place in Indonesia, China and Vietnam. Whilst Lloyd Loom is made on a small scale in the UK the larger number of Lloyd Loom companies and retailers operate as importers with the vast majority of Lloyd Loom produced in the Far East.
