= Dudly Bug =

Defunct American motor vehicle manufacturer

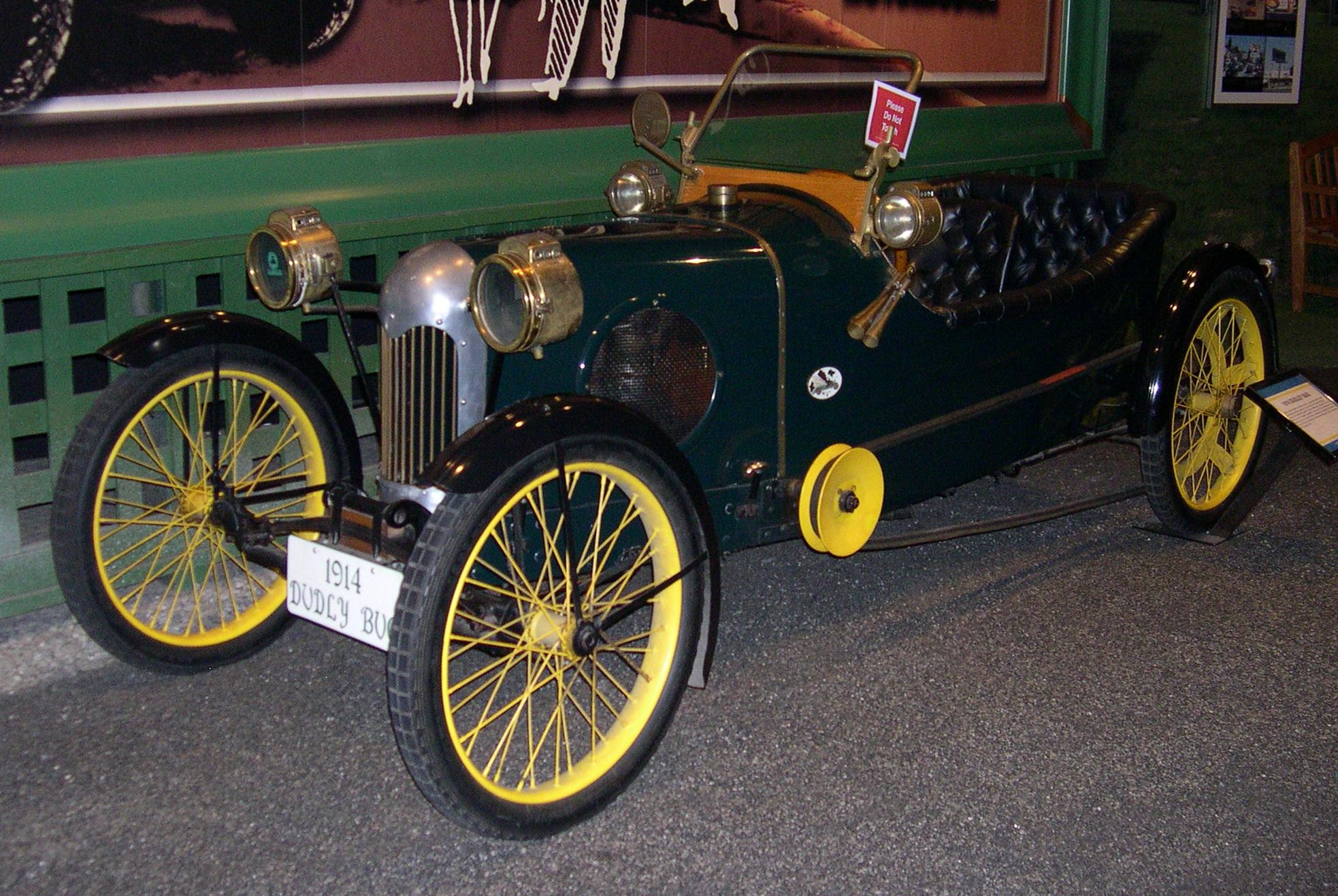
1914 Dudly Bug

The Dudly (also known as the Dudly Bug) was an American Brass Era, gas-powered cyclecar manufactured in Menominee, Michigan, by the Dudly Tool Company from 1913 to 1915. The Dudly had an ash-wood frame, two-seater open model that was originally offered with a two-cylinder air-cooled engine. The 1914 Dudly was offered with a four-cylinder 1.6 L engine.

Approximately 100 Dudly Bug vehicles were manufactured.
