= First Street Historic District =

Historic district in Michigan, United States

- U.S. National Register of Historic Places
- U.S. Historic district
- Michigan State Historic Site
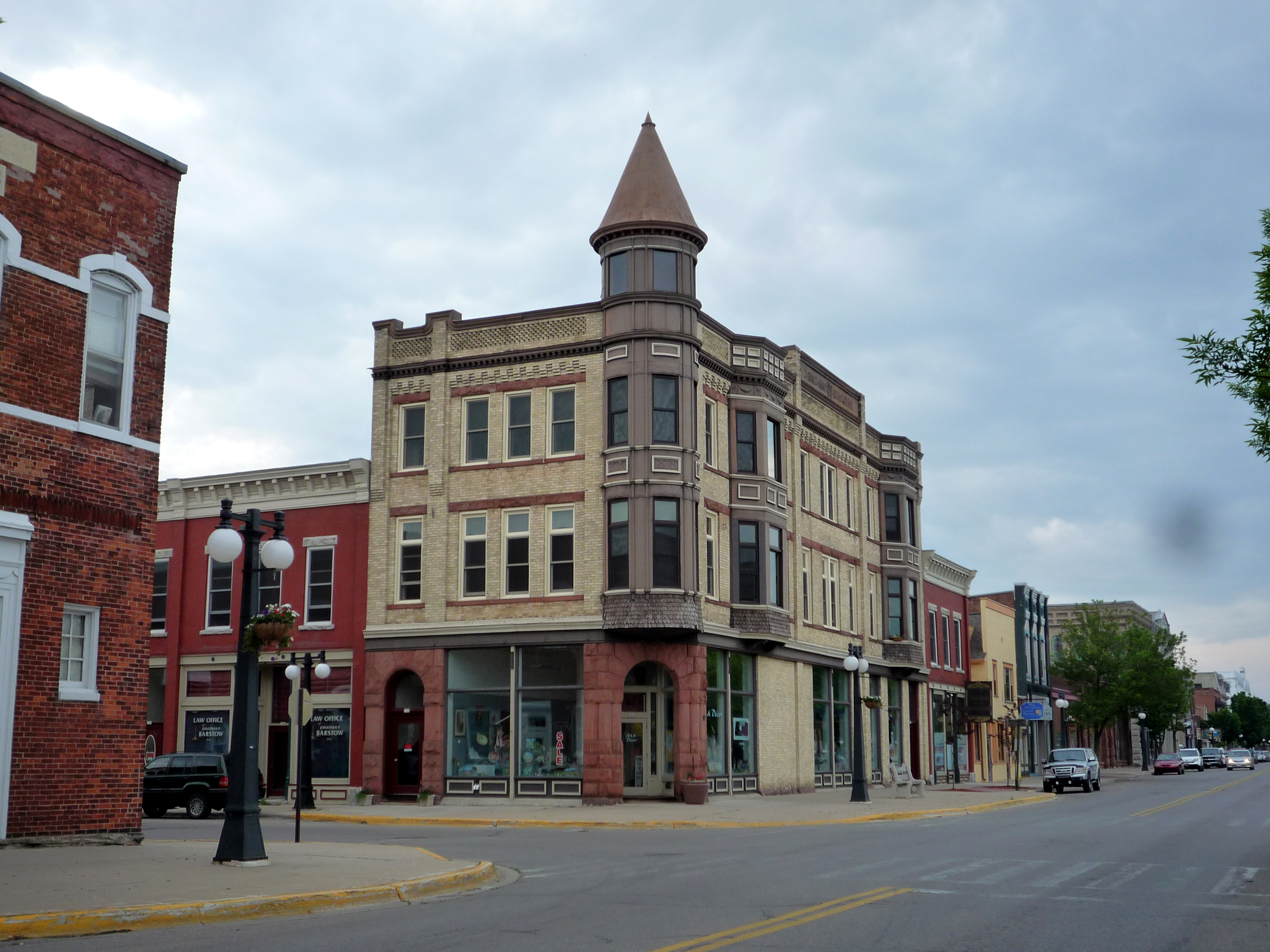

- Location within Michigan Location within the United States
- Interactive map
- Location: Roughly bounded by N side of 10th Ave., 4th Ave., 2nd St., and Green Bay Shoreline, Menominee, Michigan
- Coordinates: 45°6′19″N 87°36′13″W
- Area: 29 acres (12 ha)
- Built: 1880
- Architectural style: Beaux-Arts, Romanesque Revival, Vernacular architecture
- NRHP reference No.: 74000997

Significant dates
- Added to NRHP: December 31, 1974
- Designated MSHS: September 17, 1974

The First Street Historic District, also known as the Main Street Historic District, is a commercial historic district in Menominee, Michigan containing over 40 structures spread over a 29 acres (12 ha) area. The district is roughly bounded by Fourth Avenue, the north side of Tenth Avenue, Second Street, and the Green Bay Shoreline; the boundaries are approximately equivalent to what is locally known as the Historic Waterfront Downtown. It was listed on the National Register of Historic Places and designated a Michigan State Historic Site in 1974.

== History ==
In the mid 19th century, Menominee's location on the shore of Lake Michigan and within a heavily forested district facilitated the growth of both shipping and lumber industries in the area. Starting in the 1850s, prosperous local citizens built commercial blocks along First Street, employing local architects and using materials plentiful in the region. By the early 1900s, the growth of the mining industry brought a new wave of industrialists, who employed architects from Chicago to design elaborate public buildings in the area.

The First Street Historic District is significant as a well-maintained example of a commercial district as it appeared in the late 19th century.

== Description ==
The First Street Historic District contains over 40 commercial buildings and civic structures, as well as several private houses, spread over a 29 acres (12 ha) area. Most of these buildings date to Menominee's prosperous era which began around 1890. Many of the commercial blocks are of a vernacular Midwestern design, constructed of local red sandstone. Some are Romanesque Revival structures of locally made bricks, and several have elaborate classical or Beaux-Arts facades. Many of the buildings are in substantially original condition, or have only minor alterations.
