= Porterfield (community), Wisconsin =

Porterfield, Wisconsin
- Unincorporated community
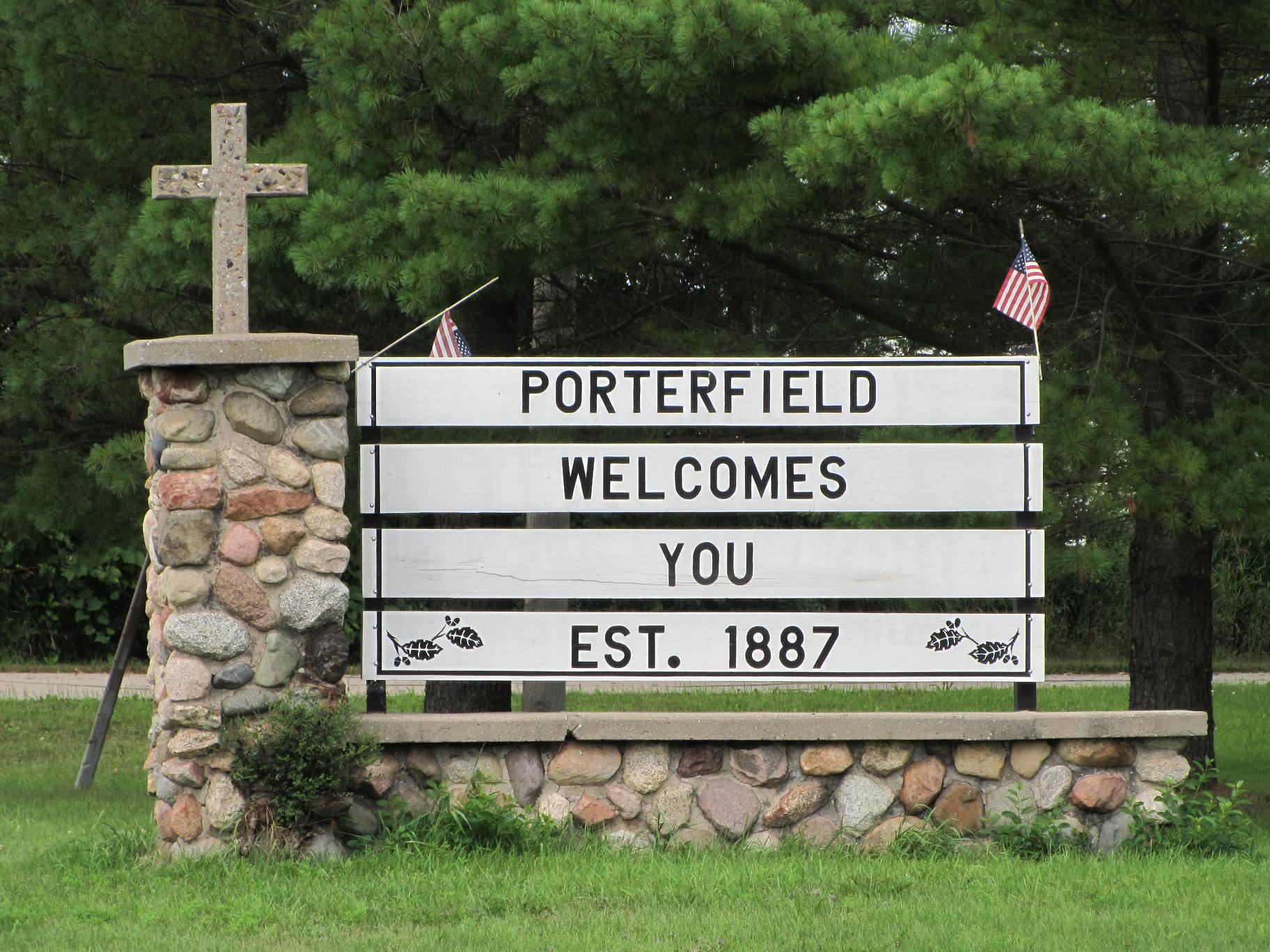
- Porterfield welcome sign on Church Street

- Location within Wisconsin Location within the United States
- Coordinates: 45°09′16″N 87°47′40″W
- Country: United States
- State: Wisconsin
- County: Marinette
- Elevation: 666 ft (203 m)
- Time zone: UTC-6 (Central (CST))
  - Summer (DST): UTC-5 (CDT)
- ZIP code: 54159
- Area codes: 715 & 534
- GNIS feature ID: 1571805

Porterfield is an unincorporated community located in the town of Porterfield, Marinette County, Wisconsin, United States.

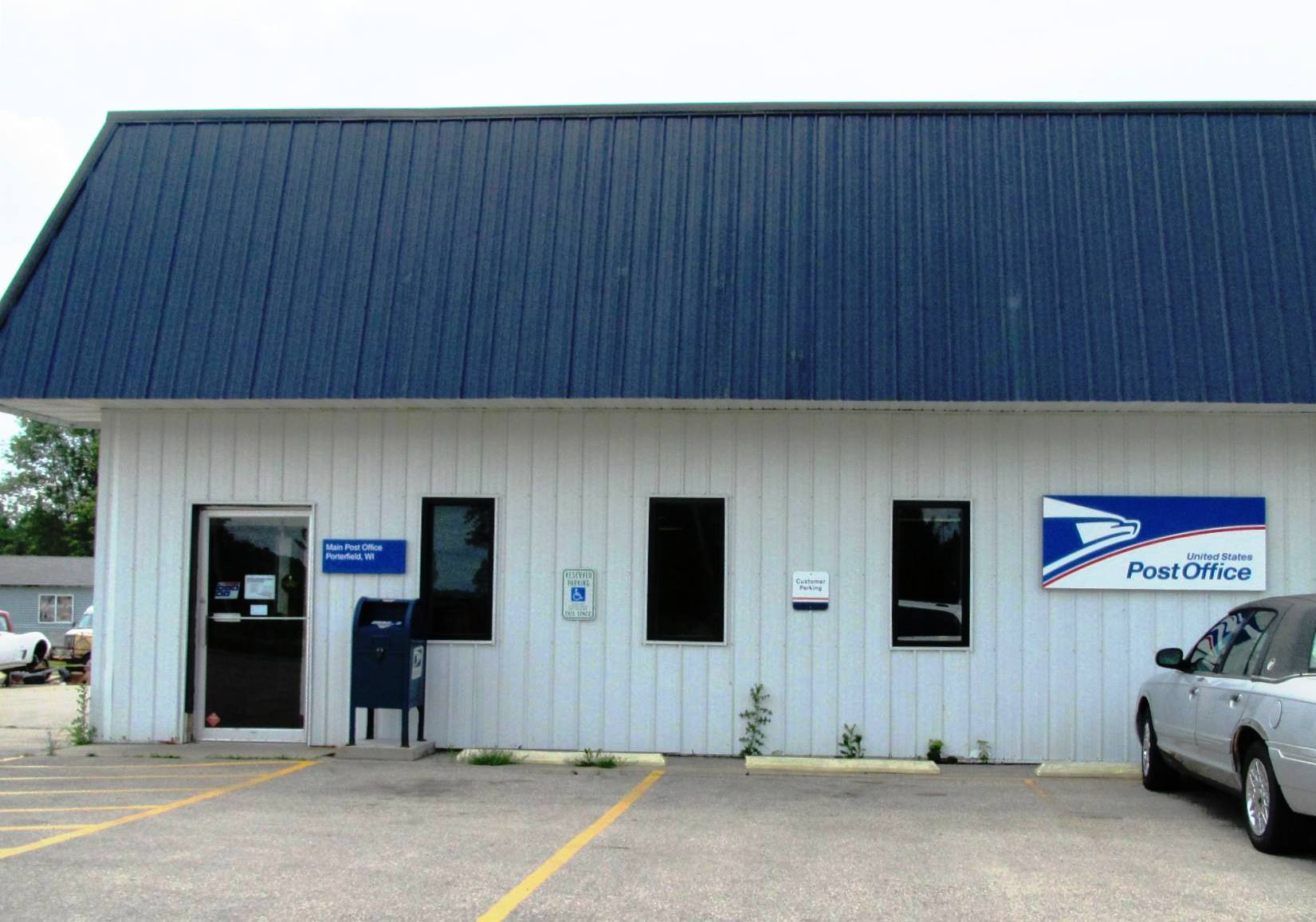
Porterfield Post Office

== Geography ==
Porterfield is located along the Escanaba and Lake Superior Railroad, 9 miles (14 km) west-northwest of Marinette. Porterfield has a post office with ZIP code 54159. The Peshtigo River runs south of the community.

== History ==
Porterfield developed as a railroad junction, and it was named after a local farmer and businessman, John Porterfield. A post office was established in Porterfield in 1885. In the past, Porterfield had an apartment house (a former grocery store), a bar, a blacksmith shop, and a cheese factory.

== School ==
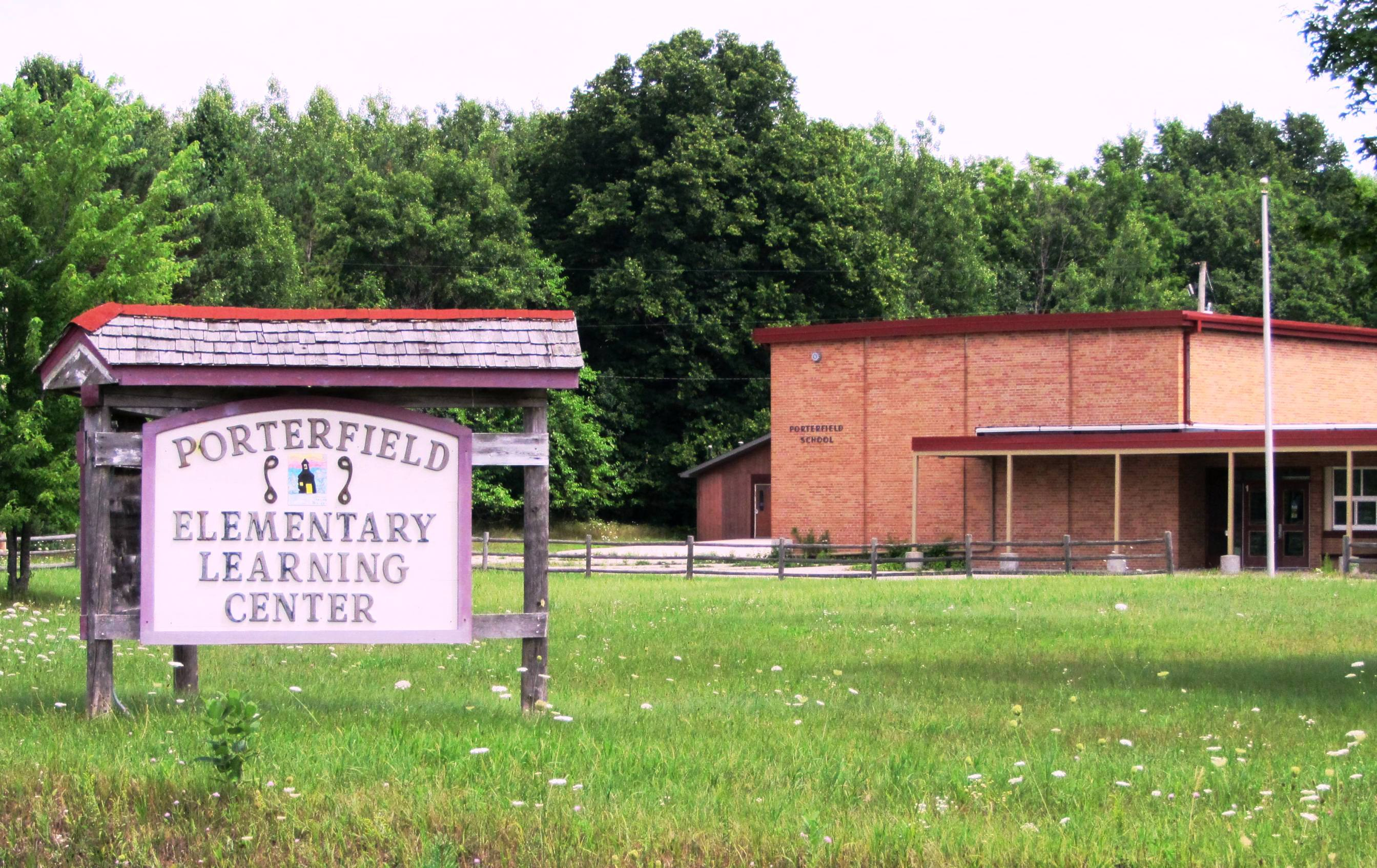
Porterfield Elementary School

Before a new elementary school was built in Porterfield in 1963, the area was served by several small schools: Miles School and Winesville School to the north, Dickie School and Fairmont School to the northwest, Fairdale School to the southwest, Phillips School, Plumb School, and Sandberg School to the south, Stewart School to the southeast, and Redelings School to the east. The old county school buildings were sold off in 1963. Porterfield Elementary School was part of the School District of Marinette and served approximately 120 students. The elementary school was closed at the end of the 2006–2007 school year.
