= Æthelstan (disambiguation) =

Æthelstan was the first King of England, reigning from 924 to 939.

Æthelstan, Athelstan, or Athelstane may also refer to:

== Places ==
- Athelstane Range, an escarpment near Rockhampton, Queensland, Australia
- Athelstan, Quebec, a small town south of Huntingdon, Quebec, Canada
- Athelstan, Iowa, a community in the United States
- Athelstane Township, Clay County, Kansas, a township in the United States
- Athelstane, Wisconsin, a town in the United States
- Athelstane (community), Wisconsin, an unincorporated community in the United States

== Other uses ==
- SS Athelstane (1941), a tanker in service 1941–45
- Æthelstan (name), a masculine given name

== See also ==
- SS Athelstane, a list of steamships
- Edelstein, the German and Yiddish cognate of Old English Æthelstan
