= Edelstein =

Edelstein is the German word for "gemstone". Edelstein is also a surname of German origin which means "noble stone" or in its literal sense "precious stone".

== Surname ==
People with this surname include:

- Arnold Edelstein, Austrian-American cartoonist known as Ed Arno
- David Edelstein, American film critic
- Erez Edelstein, Israeli basketball coach
- Eric Edelstein, American actor
- Frances Edelstein, American businesswoman
- Gershon Edelstein, Israeli rabbi
- Gordon Edelstein, American theatre director
- Jakob Edelstein, the first Judenältester (Jewish Elder) in the Theresienstadt ghetto
- Joseph Edelstein, American Yiddish theater theatrical manager and theater owner and director
- Lisa Edelstein, American actress
- Ludwig Edelstein, German-born American classical scholar and historian of medicine
- Melville Edelstein, sociologist
- Morris Michael Edelstein, American lawyer and politician
- Neal Edelstein, American film producer
- Oscar Edelstein, Argentinian composer
- Pauline Edelstein, American Yiddish theatre actress and wife of Joseph Edelstein
- Robert Edelstein, American economist
- Samson Samsonov (né Edelstein), Russian film director and screenwriter
- Stuart J. Edelstein, Swiss-American biophysicist
- Victor Edelstein, British fashion designer
- Yoel Edelstein, Israeli politician
- William A. Edelstein, American physicist

=== Variations ===
- Charles Edelstenne, French billionaire
- Mark Eidelstein, Russian actor
- Vladimir Zhirinovsky (né Eidelstein), Russian politician, nobleman
- Sigmund Zois Freiherr von Edelstein

=== Fictional characters ===
- Roderich Edelstein (Austria), from the 2009 anime Hetalia

== Toponymy ==
- Edelstein, Illinois

== Other uses ==
- Edelstein Award (known as the HIST Award for Outstanding Achievement in the History of Chemistry), prize given by the American Chemical Society
- The Edelstein Center for Social Research, Brazilian think tank
- Edelsteinaspididae, taxonomy
- Precious Stones (film), German title Edelsteine, 1918 German silent film
- Rashba–Edelstein effect, physics

== See also ==
- Æthelstan (disambiguation), the Old English cognate name
