= Wausaukee =

Wausaukee is the name of a town and a village in Marinette County, Wisconsin:

- Wausaukee (town)
- Wausaukee (village)
