= Cedarville, Wisconsin =

- Unincorporated community
- Location within Wisconsin Location within the United States
- Coordinates: 45°27′13″N 87°58′58″W
- Country: United States
- State: Wisconsin
- County: Marinette
- Elevation: 837 ft (255 m)
- Time zone: UTC-6 (Central (CST))
  - Summer (DST): UTC-5 (CDT)
- Area codes: 715 & 534
- GNIS feature ID: 1562873

Cedarville is an unincorporated community located in the towns of Amberg and Wausaukee, Marinette County, Wisconsin, United States.

== Geography ==
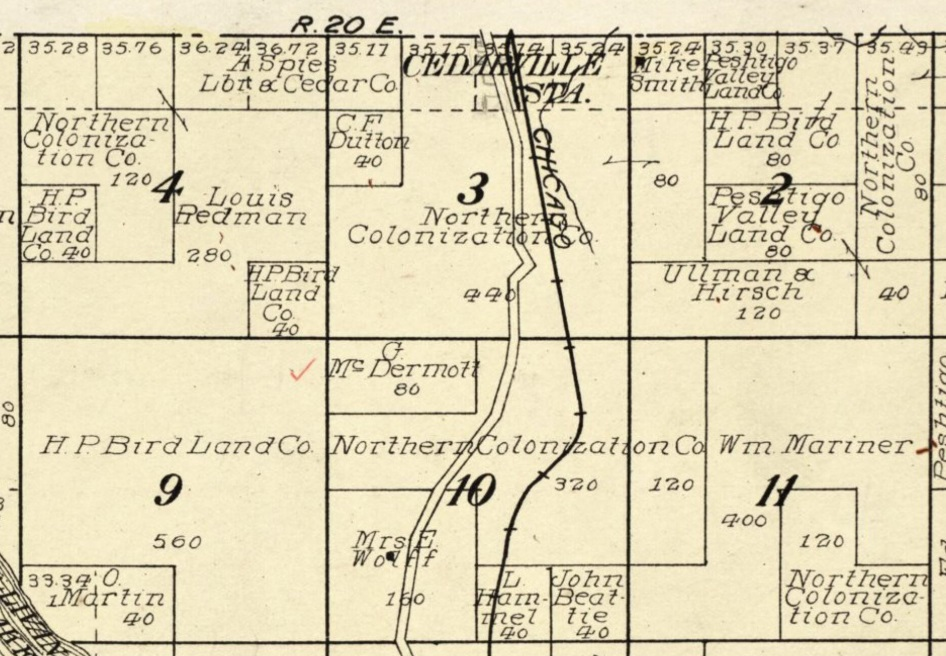
Cedarville, 1912 map detail

Cedarville is 6 miles (9.7 km) north-northwest of the village of Wausaukee, at the intersection of Amberg–Wausaukee Road and Old 38 Road at an elevation of 837 feet (255 m). It is located along the Escanaba and Lake Superior Railroad. Cedarville is connected by road to Athelstane (via County Highways V and C) to the west, Amberg to the north, and Wausaukee to the south. Little Wausaukee Creek and Cedar Lake lie the southwest, and Cedarville Creek flows to the east.

== Etymology ==
The name Cedarville refers to the white cedar that grew and was cut in the area. The railroad station at Cedarville was used for storage and transport of cedar in the early 20th century.

== History ==
The railroad connection to Cedarville was built by the Bird and Wells Lumber Company in the 1890s. In 1906, forest fires caused significant damage in Cedarville. Railroad cars loaded with wood burned on the tracks, and cedar-filled drying kilns burned. Together with neighboring Wausaukee, losses were estimated at $200,000. By 1916, Cedarville had 54 households; the settlers were mostly farmers from Indiana, Illinois, and Iowa. That same year, the community was platted as a town with two named streets, and it had a train station, potato warehouse, school, church, store, garage, and post office. An agricultural fair was held in Cedarville in the 1920s, and the settlement received electricity in 1925. However, by 1925 the settlement had also started to decline, with many families moving away.
