= Washington Cemetery (Brooklyn) =

Jewish cemetery in New York City

- Interactive map of Washington Cemetery

Details
- Established: 1850
- Location: 5400 Bay Parkway, Mapleton, Brooklyn, New York
- Country: United States
- Coordinates: 40.6190°N 73.9756°W
- Type: Jewish

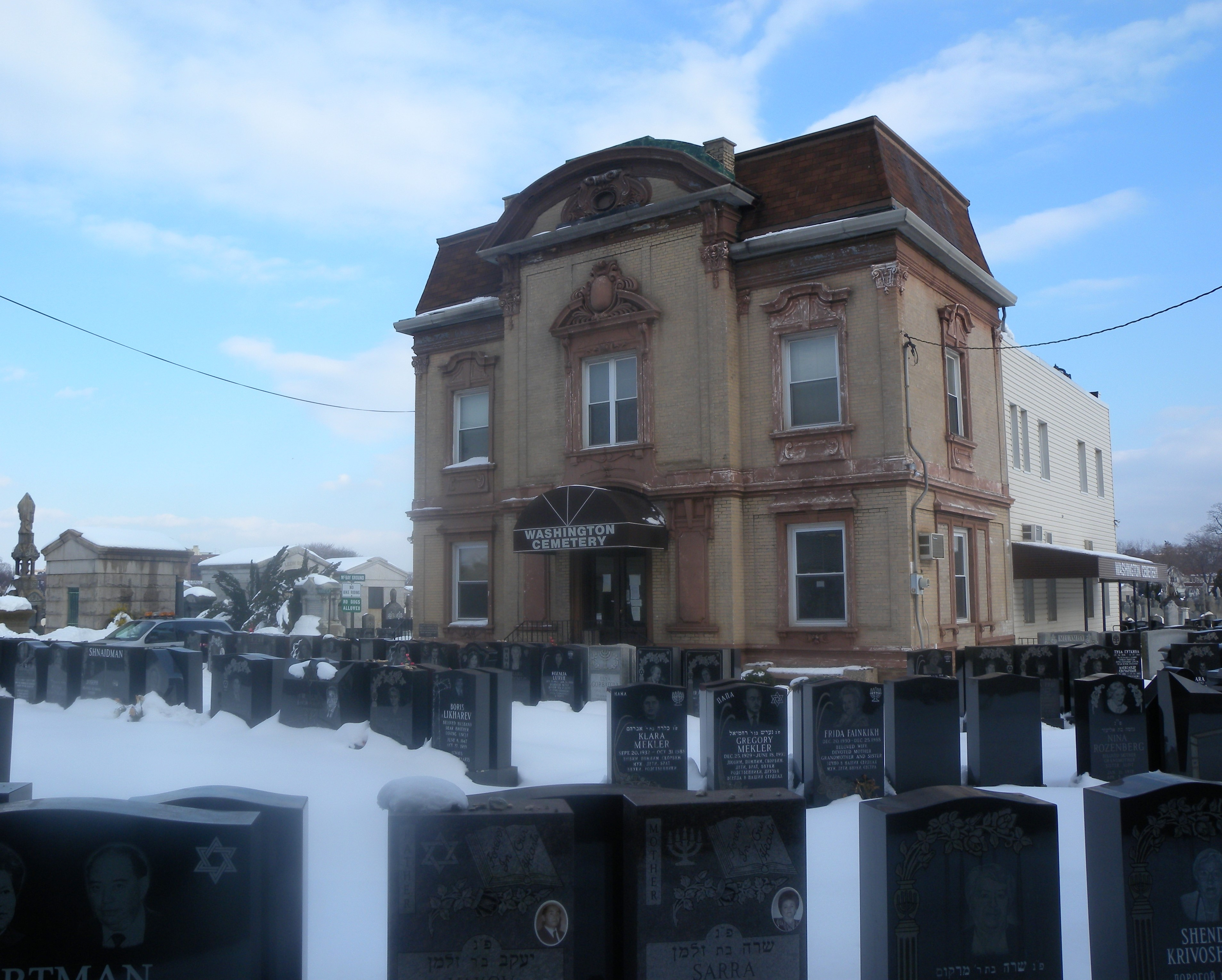
Cemetery office building located on the grounds of cemetery#1, at Bay Parkway and McDonald Avenue

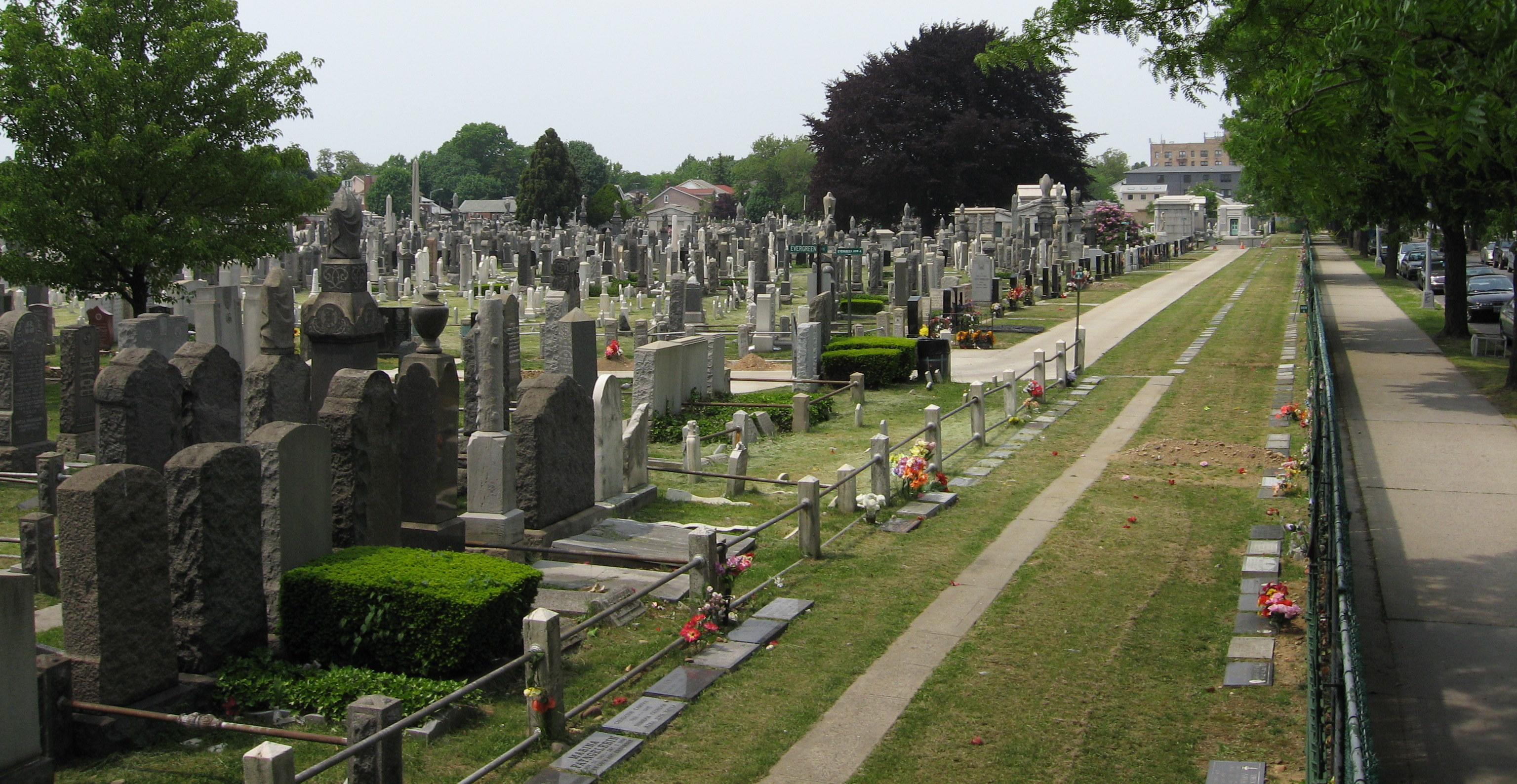
Eastern edge of cemetery#1, bordering Ocean Parkway

Washington Cemetery is a historical and predominantly Jewish burial ground located at 5400 Bay Parkway in Mapleton, Brooklyn, New York, United States.

Founded in Kings County in 1850, outside the independent city of Brooklyn, it became a Jewish burial ground as early as 1857, at first serving primarily German Jewish immigrants. Brooklyn's cemeteries were authorized under the Rural Cemetery Act of 1847, which allowed for the construction of commercial cemeteries outside what were then city limits. This part of Kings County was not yet incorporated into the City of Brooklyn, and the legislation resulted in the development of several large parcels of farmland as cemeteries. Later in the 19th and early 20th centuries, most Jewish immigrants came from the Russian Empire and Eastern Europe.

== Cemetery configuration ==
Washington Cemetery is made up of five "gated cemeteries," separated by several local Brooklyn streets. The cemetery office building is located on the grounds of Cemetery #1, which was the original cemetery. It is served by the Bay Parkway station of the F train of the New York City Subway.

The founder of Washington Cemetery, James Arlington Bennet, is buried there, as are his wife and son. Bennet was born in New York, and was proprietor and principal of the Arlington House, an educational institution on Long Island. He is usually remembered as Joseph Smith's first choice as Vice-Presidential running mate in the United States presidential election of 1844, before Smith was assassinated. His surname is misspelled on his headstone, which reads, "Author of Bennett's Book Keeping & Other Works. Founder of Washington Cemetery."

=== Cemetery #1 ===
Cemetery #1 is shaped like a pentagon, and bordered on three of its sides by major Brooklyn streets: Ocean Parkway, Bay Parkway, and McDonald Avenue. The main entrance and cemetery office building are on Bay Parkway just off McDonald Avenue. The interior of Cemetery #1 is crisscrossed by paths called Rose, Hyacinth, Jasmine, Aster, Lotus, and Evergreen avenues. It has numerical posts from number one to number one hundred and forty-nine "A" (1–149A), sections marked "ranges". It has "burial society" sections established by early immigrant groups of landsmannschaft or synagogue congregations. Burials are still being conducted here. This section houses the majority of the mausoleums and larger monuments. In December 2010, this section sustained the majority of some 200 overturned and broken headstones damaged by vandals at the cemetery. Although there are concrete walkways through the area, grave markers are very closely positioned in some areas, and visitors sometimes have to walk on grass.

=== Cemetery #2 ===
Cemetery #2 is located across from Cemetery #1 and the office building. It is triangular, bounded on two of its sides by major thoroughfares: McDonald Avenue on the northeast and Bay Parkway on the northwest; it has four entrances and exits. Cemetery posts are numbered 150 to 237. It is crisscrossed by paths, and houses burial or congregational society sections. Its named paths are Cedar, Maple, and Cypress avenues.

=== Cemetery #3 ===
Cemetery #3 is located across Bay Parkway directly across from Cemetery #2. It is bounded by Bay Parkway on its southeast and 21st Avenue on its northwest. It has five entrances and exits, and numbered posts from 231 to 333. Its named paths are Orange, Sycamore, Spruce, Aspen, and Balsam avenues.

=== Cemetery #4 ===
Cemetery #4 is directly across 21st Avenue from Cemetery #3, bounded by 21st Avenue on its southeast and 20th Avenue on its northwest, and has numbered posts are 334 to 462. It has five entrances and exits, and paths named are Walnut, Ash, Tulip, Iris, and Pine avenues.

=== Cemetery #5 ===
Cemetery #5 is directly across Cemetery #4, and bounded by 20th Avenue on its southeast. Its numbered posts run from 464 to 519. Oak, Magnolia, Arcadia, and Birch avenues are its named paths. It has sections with four numbers on its west side.

== Partial list of societies in Washington cemeteries ==
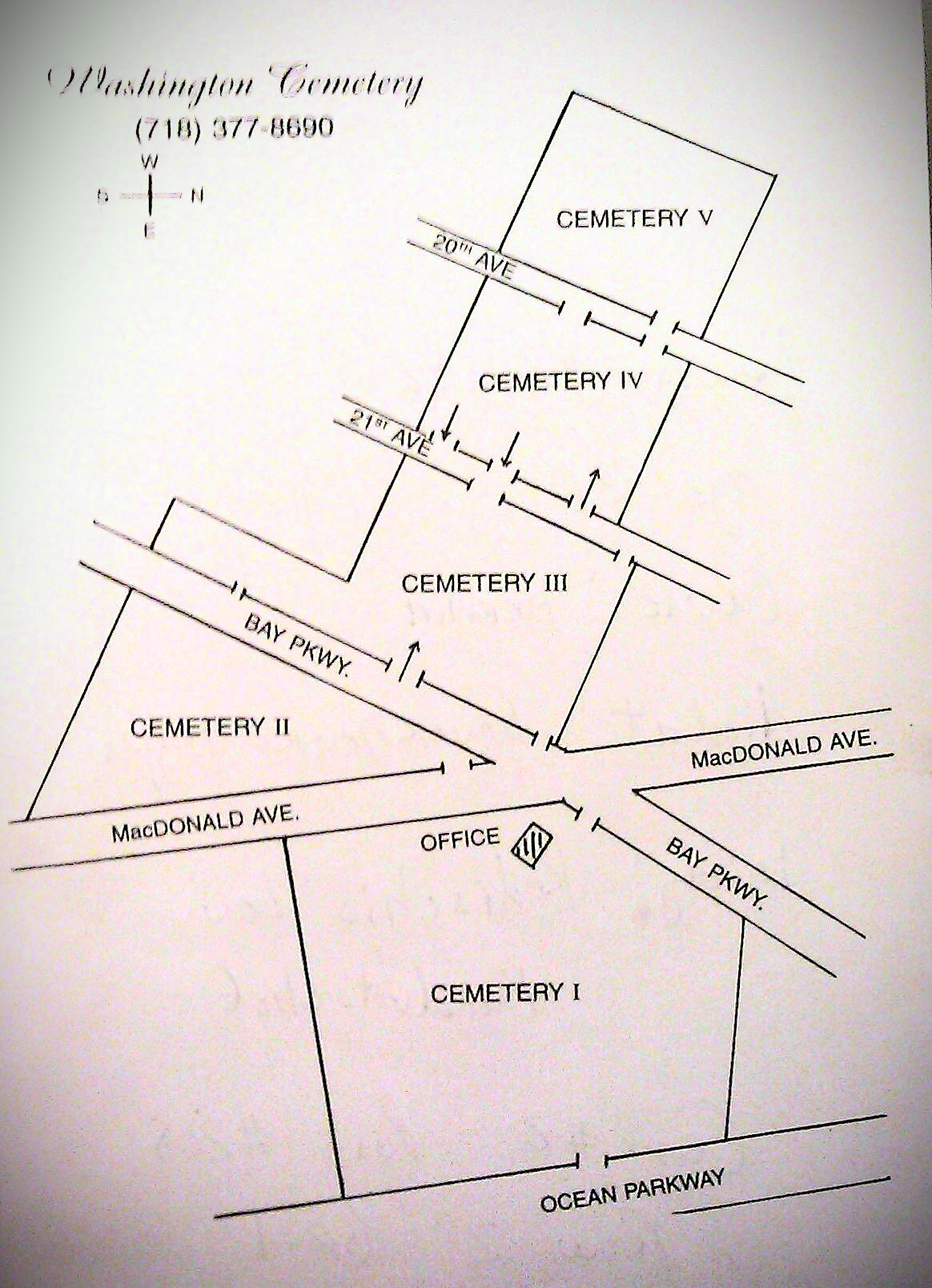
Schematic map, with through streets. The F train runs above MacDonald Avenue and has a station at Bay Parkway.

- Adler's Young Men Independent Association – Cemetery #1, Post 60
- Agudas Achim Anshe Wilner (also Congregation Machsika Torah Ansha Seinier) – established in 1874
- Agudas Achim Anshe Wilner (also Congregation Machsike Torah Anshe Wilno) – established in 1899
- Beth Israel Congregation – Cemetery #1, Post 62
- Bielsker Bruderlicher Unterstitzungs Verein – Cemetery #2, Post 222
- Bialystoker Somach Noflim
- Bnei Isaac Anshei Lechowitz (Lyakhovichi)
- Bnai Mosche Anshe Ullanover & Umgagend
- Chebra Rofei Cholim M. Krakau – Cemetery #1, Post 102 (Cemetery Records & Photo of Gate)
- Chevra Adas Wolkowisk – Cemetery #2, Post 158 and Cemetery #4, Post 371
- Chevra Anshe Chesed B'nai Kowna – Cemetery #1, Post 81
- Chevra Bikur Cholem Anshei Zuromin – Cemetery #4, Post 363
- Chevra Nor Tomid Anshi Lebashoff – Cemetery Section #3 Post 300
- Chevra Machzikei Hadas Anshei Sfard – Cemetery #3, Post 295
- Chevra Rodfei Zedek Anshe Ritava – Cemetery #1, Post 14
- Chevra Shaare Benah – Cemetery #1, Post 83
- Congregation Agudath Achim M'Krakauer, Organized in 1867 – Cemetery #1, Post 104
- Congregation Bnei Israel Anshe Keidan – Cemetery #1, Post 144, and Cemetery #3, Post 287
- Congregation Tifferith Israel of Brooklyn – Cemetery #5, Post 517
- Dobromiler Sick & Benevolent Society, Cemetery #2
- Erster Dobromiler Kranken Unt. Verein – Cemetery #2, Post 194
- First Brodier B'nai B'rith Congregation – Cemetery #2, Post 190
- First Rumanian-American Brotherhood Lodge #13 (AOAS)
- Greidinger Phodoler Unterst. Verein – Cemetery #4, Post 447
- Palestine Lodge – Cemetery #1, Post 71, I.O.S.B.
- Rumanian-American Benevolent Society
- United Wilner Benevolent Association – established on December 24, 1888
- Willner Brother Benevolent Association (also Miskan Bezslel Anshe Wilner)
- Romenar Benevolent Association

== Notable burials ==
- Barney Bernard (1877–1924) – actor
- David Blaustein (1866–1912) – educator, rabbi, and social worker
- Joseph Edelstein (1858–1940) – Yiddish Theater theatrical manager and theater owner and director
- Pauline Edelstein (1866–1942) – Yiddish theatre actress and wife of Joseph Edelstein
- Mark Goldberg (1878–1926) – New York State assemblyman, 1907–1919
- Abraham Goldfaden (1840–1908) – Yiddish playwright, poet, composer, stage director, actor and producer
- Jacob Goldstein (1891–1920) – lawyer and politician
- Jacob Gordin (1853–1909) – Yiddish playwright
- Louis B. Heller (1905–1993) – U.S. Congressman
- Moses Horowitz (1844–1910) – Yiddish actor and playwright
- Mike Jacobs (1880–1953) – boxing promoter
- David Kessler (1860–1920) – actor
- Philip Klein (1849–1926) – rabbi
- Alexander Lambert (1863–1929) – pianist and piano teacher
- Sigmund Mogulesko (1858–1914) – Yiddish actor, comedian, singer, director and composer
- John Paley (1871–1907) – Yiddish journalist, writer, newspaper editor
- Herman Rosenthal (?–1912) – gambler and bookmaker, murdered by gangsters in a conspiracy for complaining to the press about dirty police extorting too much from his illegal gambling business
- Jerry Sterner (1938–2001) – playwright
- Abner Tannenbaum (1848–1913) – Yiddish writer and journalist
- Lilyan Tashman (1899–1934) – actress
- "Big" Jack Zelig (1888–1912), a Jewish-American New York City gangster and one of the last leaders of the Eastman Gang
- Eliakum Zunser (1836–1913) – Yiddish poet and songwriter
