= Adelstein =

Adelstein is a surname of German origin meaning "precious stone".

Notable people with the surname include:

- Abraham Manie Adelstein (1916–1992), South African medical statistician
- Garrett Adelstein (born 1986), American professional poker player
- Jake Adelstein (born 1969), American journalist and writer
- Jonathan Adelstein, American Federal Communications Commissioner
- Marty Adelstein, American television producer
- Paul Adelstein (born 1969), American film actor
- Stan Adelstein (1931–2026), American politician

== See also ==
- Edelstein
