= David Blaustein (disambiguation) =

The name David Blaustein can refer to:

- David Blaustein, American journalist
- David Blaustein (educator) (1866–1912), Belarusian-American educator
- David Blaustein (filmmaker) (1953–2021), Argentine film director, screenwriter and producer
