= Jerry Sterner =

American dramatist

- Born: Jerry Joseph Sterner; September 15, 1938
- Died: June 11, 2001 (aged 62)
- Burial place: Washington Cemetery; 40.6192°N 73.9758°W
- Notable work: Other People's Money

Jerry Joseph Sterner (15 September 1938 – 11 June 2001) was an American businessman and playwright, best known for the play, Other People's Money: The Ultimate Seduction, later, adapted as the 1991 romantic-comedy-drama film.

== Early life ==
Jerry Sterner was born in the Bronx. Sterner attended City College of New York.

== Career ==
Sterner sold tokens for the New York City Transit Authority, on the night shift, where, in nearly six years, he wrote seven plays in the booth.

In 1984, at the age of 46, he left a real estate business, as president of David C. Gold & Company, to become a writer full-time. His early plays include Tit for Tat and Be Happy for Me.

His first success was Other People's Money, which opened at the Minetta Lane Theater in 1989, and ran for several years. A play for 3 males and 2 females, It starred Kevin Conway, Mercedes Ruehl, James Murtaugh, Arch Johnson, and Scotty Bloch.

He worked on several musicals, including one with Jerry Bock, called 1040.

Sterner was a regular contributor to the business section of the New York Times and Fortune magazine.

== Plays ==
- Top 40 (?)
- Tit for Tat (?)
- Be Happy for Me (1986)(Off Broadway play starring David Groh, Philip Bosco and Priscilla Lopez.)
- Other People's Money: The Ultimate Seduction (1989)
- Topper (1997)
- 1040 (1998)
- Crossing the Double White Line (2005)

== Personal life ==
In 1966, he married Jean Sterner. They have two daughters, Emily James and the writer, Kate Shaffar.

He is buried behind his old building in Brooklyn, in Washington Cemetery with a headstone sardonically inscribed: "Finally, a plot."
