= SS Athelstane =

A number of steamships were named Athelstane, including-

- SS Athelstane (1872), a cargo ship in service 1872–92
- SS Athelstane (1918), a tanker in service 1935–42
- SS Athelstane (1920), a tanker in service 1922–26
- SS Athelstane (1928), a coastal tanker in service 1928–35
- SS Athelstane (1941), a tanker in service 1941–45
