= John Paley =

Russian-born American Yiddish writer and newspaper editor

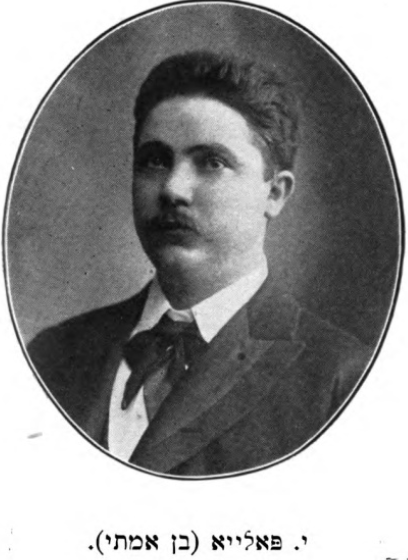
- Born: February 6, 1871; Plyeshchanitsy, Minsk Governorate, Russia
- Died: December 23, 1907 (aged 36); Brooklyn, New York, U.S.
- Resting place: Washington Cemetery
- Education: Yitzchak Elchanan Spektor's yeshiva
- Occupations: Writer; newspaper editor

John Paley (February 6, 1871 – December 23, 1907) was a Russian-born American Yiddish writer and newspaper editor.

== Biography ==
=== Early life ===
Paley was born on February 6, 1871, in Plyeshchanitsy, Minsk Governorate, Russian Empire, the son of Hyman Paley and Chaye Chortow. His father later worked as principal of a Yiddish school in Rochester, New York.

=== Education ===
Paley's father gave him a traditional education. When he was thirteen, he entered the Volozhin Yeshiva. He then spent two years in Liepāja, where he acquired a secular education. He then went to Kaunas and studied in Rabbi Yitzchak Elchanan Spektor's yeshiva. He later moved to Moscow and worked as manager of a commercial house. He allegedly converted to Christianity at one point, but he immigrated to New York City in 1888 and returned to Judaism.

== Work ==
Paley's first novel, Die Russische Helden, was published in the Folksadvocat. He then joined their staff and later became its editor. In 1892, he became editor of the Yiddishe Presse in Philadelphia. In 1894, he became a founder and publisher of the Folksvechter back in New York. When that paper was sold, he joined the staff of the Yiddishes Tageblatt, working with that paper until he died. Under him, the paper was opposed to socialism. As editor of the paper, he manufactured stories for the paper. During the Spanish–American War, he dug up incidents from the Spanish Inquisition and printed them in the paper as if they only occurred the day before. He once tricked a Jewish peddler to eat fried oysters with him, and when he told the peddler he ate unkosher food he threw up the food and lay sick in bed for several days. The next day, Paley reported a story about a gang of anti-Semites who stuffed oysters down a Jewish peddler's throat until the peddler died of suffocation. When the truth came out, he accused atheists were trying to ruin him. His employer was Kasriel Sarasohn.

Paley also wrote dramas "The Russian Nihilist" and "Life in New York," "Die Schwarze Chevrah," "Uriel Acosta," "Mysteries of the East Side," "The Erev Rav," "Yichus und Verbrechen," and "Das Leben in New York."

== Personal life ==
Paley was married to Sophia Amchaintzky.

== Death ==
Paley died at home in Brooklyn from gas asphyxiation on December 23, 1907. The police initially reported the death a suicide, but the coroner found the death to be accidental. He was buried in Washington Cemetery.
