= Zachary A. Vane =

American politician

Z. A. Vane
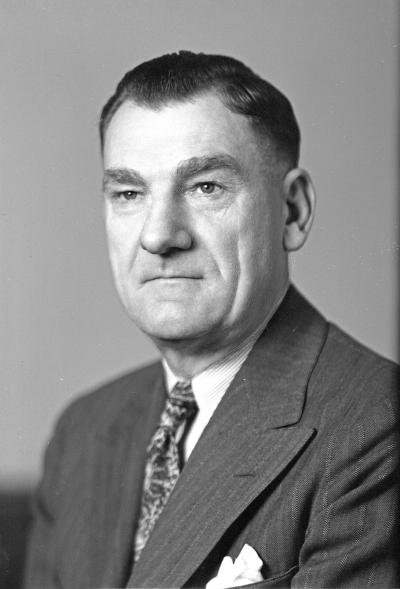
- Vane in 1947

Member of the Washington House of Representatives from the 29th district
- In office January 1, 1957 – January 9, 1961
- Preceded by: John G. McCutcheon
- Succeeded by: Charles E. Newschwander
- In office January 9, 1933 – January 9, 1953
- Preceded by: W. O. McCaw
- Succeeded by: John G. McCutcheon

Member of the Washington Senate from the 29th district
- In office January 9, 1953 – January 10, 1955
- Preceded by: Donald W. Eastvold
- Succeeded by: H. N. “Barney” Jackson

Personal details
- Born: May 16, 1892 Wausaukee, Wisconsin, U.S.
- Died: February 8, 1993 (aged 100) Tacoma, Washington, U.S.
- Party: Democratic
- Spouse: Marie (m.1946–1993; his death)
- Occupation: realtor

Zachary A. Vane (May 16, 1892 – February 8, 1993) was an American politician in the state of Washington.

Vane served in the Washington House of Representatives as a Democrat from the 29th district from 1933 until his appointment to the State Senate on January 9, 1953, after Donald W. Eastvold resigned to become the Attorney General of Washington. He served in the Senate until 1955. In 1957, after state representative John G. McCutcheon resigned the seat in the House of Representatives which Vane had previously held, he was appointed to fulfill the unexpired term, and would serve until 1961. Vane, who was born in Wisconsin, was a realtor, and lived in Tacoma, Washington since 1914. In 1993, he died at the age of 100.
