= Abner Tannenbaum =

Jewish-American writer and journalist

Abner Tannenbaum (March 1, 1848 – July 19, 1913) was a Russian-born Jewish-American Yiddish writer and journalist.

== Early life ==
Tannenbaum was born on March 1, 1848, in Shirvint, Russian Empire, the son of Hirsch Tannenbaum.

Tannenbaum grew up in Kamenets-Podolsk, where his parents moved to when he was young. He studied in the Kamenets state school for Jews, where Avrom Ber Gotlober was the supervisor Mendele Mocher Sforim was his teacher. In 1858, he moved to Kishinev with his parents and attended the local high school while studying Jewish subjects privately. He didn't graduate from the high school, and initially worked as a merchant. He later received a diploma from the Imperial University of Odessa for his historical and geographical studies. He eventually became manager of a wholesale drug business.

== Immigration and career ==
Tannenbaum immigrated to America in 1887, settling in New York City and initially opening a small candy and cigar store. He wrote for Der Morgenstern from 1889 to 1890, after which he wrote for other Yiddish and Hebrew publications. He contributed to, among other papers, Kasriel Hirsch Sarasohn's Yidishes Tageblat and Yudishe Gazetten, Zvi Hirsch Masliansky and Bukanski's Di Yudishe Velt, the Hebrew journal Haleom, and the Philadelphia papers Filadelfyer Shtats-Tsaytung, Di Yudishe Prese, and Di Gegnvart. He also edited the Zionist Mevaseret Tsiyon in 1898, and from 1889 to 1893 he contributed to the anti-religious Tefila Zaka that was published every year on the High Holidays by the New York anarchist group Pyonire der Frayhayt.

Tannenbaum translated German and French novels into Yiddish, especially the works of Jules Verne. He later wrote his own novels which one source compared to the works of German pedagogue J. H. Campe. He wrote and popularized encyclopedic items in The Jewish Gazette. He had an easy writing style that made his work intelligible to people not used to reading at all, and managed to develop a large audience that were introduced to information on various scientific and historical subjects through him and his translations and articles. He also wrote both the two-part book "History of the Jews in America" and "Commercial, Industrial, and Agricultural Geography of the United States" in 1905.

Tannenbaum was a regular contributor for the Jewish Morning Journal for the last few years of his life, in charge of two columns called “Natur un Kultur” (Nature and Culture) and “Handl un Industrye” (Business and Industry). He also published a series of biographies and characterizations of major Jewish figures for the weekly Der Amerikaner.

== Family and death ==
Tannenbaum had a son and three daughters.

Tannenbaum died at home from acute pneumonia on July 19, 1913. He had just returned from a vacation in Sharon Springs when he died. His funeral was held in the Hebrew Sheltering and Immigrant Aid Society's building on 229 East Broadway. He was buried in Washington Cemetery.
