= Athelstane, Wisconsin =

- Town
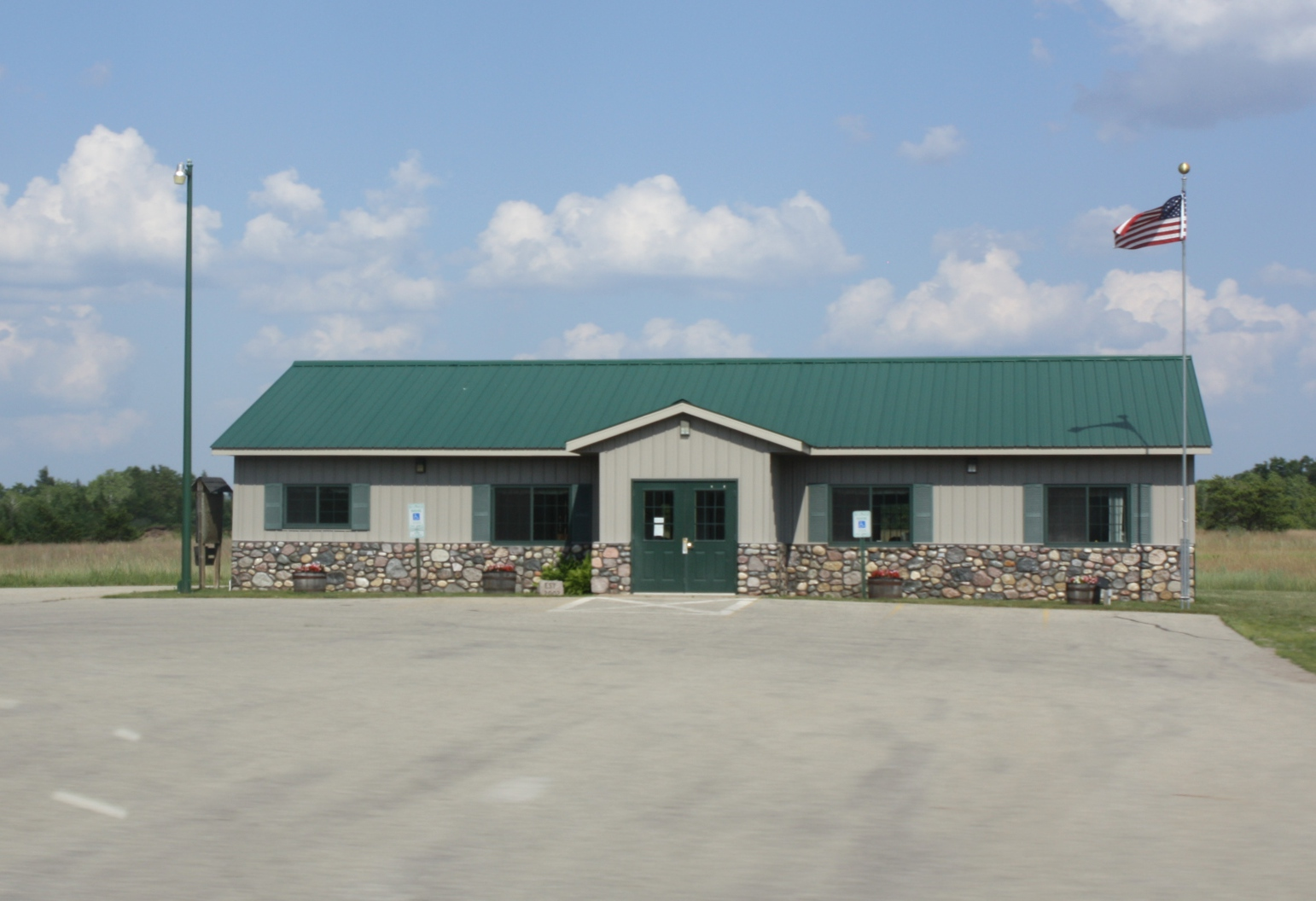
- Town hall

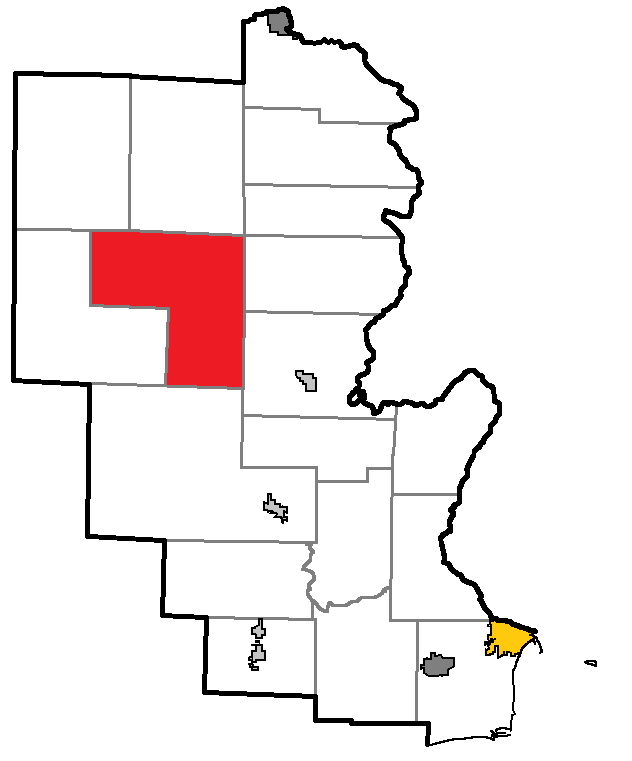
- Location of Athelstane, within Marinette County
- Coordinates: 45°28′43″N 88°9′38″W
- Country: United States
- State: Wisconsin
- County: Marinette

Area
  - Total: 107.0 sq mi (277.0 km^{2})
  - Land: 106.2 sq mi (275.0 km^{2})
  - Water: 0.77 sq mi (2.0 km^{2})
- Elevation: 1,040 ft (317 m)

Population (2020)
  - Total: 554
  - Density: 5.22/sq mi (2.01/km^{2})
- Time zone: UTC-6 (Central (CST))
  - Summer (DST): UTC-5 (CDT)
- FIPS code: 55-03525
- GNIS feature ID: 1582726

Athelstane is a town in Marinette County, Wisconsin, United States. The population was 554 at the 2020 census. The unincorporated community of Athelstane is located in the town.

== History ==
The name Athelstane is derived from the Scottish word athelstane, meaning Athel's stone.

== Geography ==
According to the United States Census Bureau, the town has a total area of 107.0 square miles (277.1 km^{2}), of which 106.2 square miles (275.0 km^{2}) is land and 0.8 square mile (2.0 km^{2}) (0.74%) is water.

The source of the Wausaukee River is located in the town. The river then flows east into the Town of Wausaukee.

== Demographics ==
As of the census of 2000, there were 601 people, 270 households, and 179 families residing in the town. The population density was 5.7 inhabitants per square mile (2.2/km^{2}). There were 995 housing units at an average density of 9.4 per square mile (3.6/km^{2}). The racial makeup of the town was 98.34% White, 0.50% African American, 0.67% Native American, and 0.50% from two or more races. Hispanic or Latino of any race were 0.67% of the population.

There were 270 households, out of which 15.6% had children under the age of 18 living with them, 54.4% were married couples living together, 8.5% had a female householder with no husband present, and 33.7% were non-families. 30.0% of all households were made up of individuals, and 11.5% had someone living alone who was 65 years of age or older. The average household size was 2.23 and the average family size was 2.72.

In the town, the population was spread out, with 18.8% under the age of 18, 6.0% from 18 to 24, 20.3% from 25 to 44, 35.1% from 45 to 64, and 19.8% who were 65 years of age or older. The median age was 49 years. For every 100 females, there were 103.0 males. For every 100 females age 18 and over, there were 106.8 males.

The median income for a household in the town was $29,602, and the median income for a family was $38,269. Males had a median income of $26,875 versus $19,375 for females. The per capita income for the town was $18,394. About 12.1% of families and 13.0% of the population were below the poverty line, including 29.7% of those under age 18 and 9.7% of those age 65 or over.
