= Other People's Money =

1991 film by Norman Jewison

- Theatrical release poster
- Directed by: Norman Jewison
- Screenplay by: Alvin Sargent
- Based on: Other People's Money; 1989 play by Jerry Sterner
- Produced by: Norman Jewison; Ric Kidney
- Starring: Danny DeVito; Gregory Peck; Penelope Ann Miller; Piper Laurie
- Cinematography: Haskell Wexler
- Edited by: Hubert C. de la Bouillerie; Lou Lombardo; Michael Pacek
- Music by: David Newman
- Distributed by: Warner Bros.
- Release date: October 18, 1991 (United States)
- Running time: 101 minutes
- Country: United States
- Language: English
- Box office: $25,682,090

Other People's Money is a 1991 American romantic comedy drama film directed by Norman Jewison and written by Alvin Sargent, based on the 1989 play Other People's Money by Jerry Sterner. The film stars Danny DeVito, Gregory Peck, Penelope Ann Miller, and Piper Laurie. It follows Lawrence "Larry the Liquidator" Garfield (DeVito), a corporate raider who targets a family-owned manufacturing company and becomes romantically involved with Kate (Miller), the lawyer hired to stop his takeover bid.

The film was shot primarily in New York City and in locations in Connecticut. Released by Warner Bros. on October 18, 1991, Other People's Money grossed approximately $25.7 million at the box office. The film received generally negative reviews from critics. This film is notable as Peck's last major film performance before his retirement.

== Plot ==
Lawrence "Larry the Liquidator" Garfield is a corporate raider who has become wealthy by acquiring companies and selling off their assets. With the help of a computerized stock-analysis program called Carmen, he identifies the family-owned New England Wire & Cable Company as his next target. Although the Rhode Island company remains profitable overall, its aging Wire and Cable division is struggling, leading Lawrence to conclude that the company's assets are worth more than its market value. After failing to persuade company chairman Andrew "Jorgy" Jorgenson to sell the division, Lawrence begins acquiring shares in an effort to gain control of the company.

Desperate to prevent a hostile takeover, Jorgy is persuaded by his wife Bea and company president Bill Coles to hire his stepdaughter, corporate lawyer Kate Sullivan, who is not fond of Jorgy or his business. Lawrence becomes attracted to Kate and aggressively pursues her romantically. The pair agrees to a temporary truce, but both continue working behind the scenes to advance their positions: Kate encourages the board and its allies to acquire additional shares, while Lawrence continues purchasing stock through a front organization. Kate later obtains a temporary restraining order preventing Lawrence from buying further shares. Despite their professional rivalry, the relationship between Lawrence and Kate becomes increasingly flirtatious.

Lawrence proposes exchanging his shares in the company for the Wire and Cable division, allowing him to profit from its assets while leaving Jorgy in control of the remaining business. Still, Jorgy refuses to sacrifice the jobs of the division's employees or surrender his family business to a man like Lawrence. Concerned about the company's future and his own financial security, Bill pressures Jorgy to accept a compromise. Instead, Jorgy decides to let the shareholders determine the company's future at the annual meeting, believing it is the only course he can accept. During their negotiations, Lawrence argues that he and Kate are alike, both caring more about winning than the people affected by the outcome.

Seeking to protect his and his family's interests, Bill secretly approaches Lawrence and offers him the voting rights to his shares in exchange for compensation. Bea later meets with Lawrence herself and offers him $1 million to abandon the takeover, but he refuses. She chastizes him for his callous attitude towards the people affected by his actions. Afterward, Lawrence confronts Kate outside her apartment and unexpectedly proposes marriage, confessing that he has fallen in love with her and fears losing her once the takeover battle ends. Overwhelmed, Kate leaves without answering.

On the day of the shareholders' meeting, Jorgy confides in Bea that he fears his values and methods have become outdated. Addressing the shareholders, Jorgy argues that businesses have responsibilities to their employees and the community, and warns against dismantling companies solely for financial gain. Lawrence responds that technological change has rendered the Wire and Cable division obsolete and urges shareholders to prioritize their own financial interests. When the votes are counted, Lawrence is given control of the company. Kate leaves, and the company is soon shuttered.

Back in Manhattan, Lawrence finds little satisfaction in his victory. Kate telephones him with a new proposal: she has secured a long-term agreement with a Japanese company to manufacture stainless-steel wire cloth used in airbags, providing a potential future for Wire and Cable. She asks Lawrence to sell the company back to the employees so that they can modernize the plant and pursue the new opportunity. Intrigued, Lawrence excitedly agrees to discuss the proposal over lunch.

== Cast ==
- Danny DeVito as Lawrence ("Larry the Liquidator") Garfield
- Gregory Peck as Andrew ("Jorgy") Jorgenson
- Penelope Ann Miller as Kate Sullivan
- Piper Laurie as Bea Sullivan
- Dean Jones as Bill Coles
- R. D. Call as Arthur
- Mo Gaffney as Harriet
- Tom Aldredge as Ozzie

== Production ==
The film was mainly shot in New York City. The original 7 World Trade Center lobby can be seen briefly during the opening credits. Some of the scenes that took place inside the factory were shot in the now defunct "Seymour Specialty and Wire" in Seymour, Connecticut. Other scenes were shot in the (also defunct) Gilbert and Bennett mill in Georgetown, Connecticut.

== Reception ==
The film received mixed to negative reviews, with a 31% rating on review aggregate Rotten Tomatoes based on 16 reviews. Audiences polled by CinemaScore gave the film an average grade of "B−" on an A+ to F scale.

Roger Ebert of the Chicago Sun-Times gave the film 3.5 out of 4 stars, but said, "I didn't like the last scene of 'Other People's Money.' It felt tacked on, manufactured, concocted out of a Hollywood studio's knee-jerk need to provide a smileyface ending that was not in the spirit of the film." Janet Maslin of The New York Times said of Sargent's adaptation, "culminates in a speechy but effective debate about the merits of old-fashioned business versus the corporate takeover," but still felt that the film was "too genial to be hard-hitting."

== See also ==
- Spotswood (film)
