= Wausaukee River =

River in northern Wisconsin

- Location within Wisconsin Location within the United States

Location
- Country: United States
- State: Wisconsin

Physical characteristics
- Source
  - location: Town of Athelstane
  - coordinates: 45.4771858°N 88.1862251°W
- Mouth: Menominee River
  - location: Town of Wausaukee
  - coordinates: 45.3635828°N 87.8859447°W
  - elevation: 679 ft (207 m)

Basin features
- Tributaries
  - left: Little Wausaukee Creek, Coldwater Brook
  - right: Heubler Creek

The Wausaukee River is a river that flows through Marinette County, Wisconsin. The source of the river is in the Town of Athelstane. The river then flows through the Town of Athelstane and into the Town of Wausaukee. The Wausaukee River continues through the village of Wausaukee before flowing into the Menominee River.

== See also ==
- List of rivers of Wisconsin
