= Athelstane (community), Wisconsin =

Athelstane, Wisconsin
- Unincorporated community
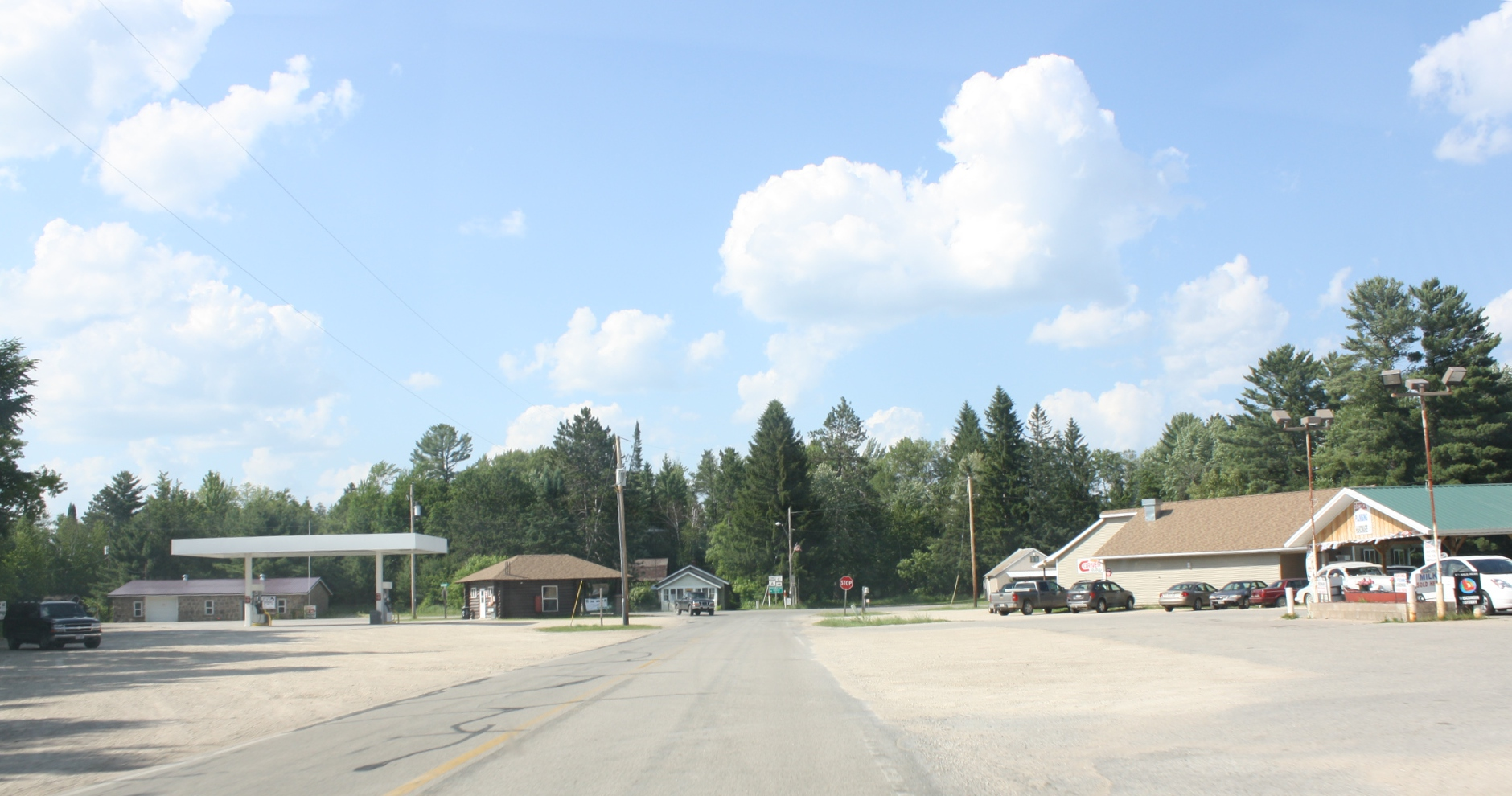
- Looking north at downtown Athelstane

- Location within Wisconsin Location within the United States
- Coordinates: 45°25′26″N 88°05′43″W
- Country: United States
- State: Wisconsin
- County: Marinette
- Elevation: 938 ft (286 m)
- Time zone: UTC-6 (Central (CST))
  - Summer (DST): UTC-5 (CDT)
- ZIP code: 54104
- Area codes: 715 & 534
- GNIS feature ID: 1560992

Athelstane is an unincorporated community located in the town of Athelstane, Marinette County, Wisconsin, United States. Athelstane is 8 miles (13 km) west-northwest of Wausaukee. Athelstane has a post office with ZIP code 54104. There are a number of lakes in the surrounding area, including Lost Lake.

== Images ==
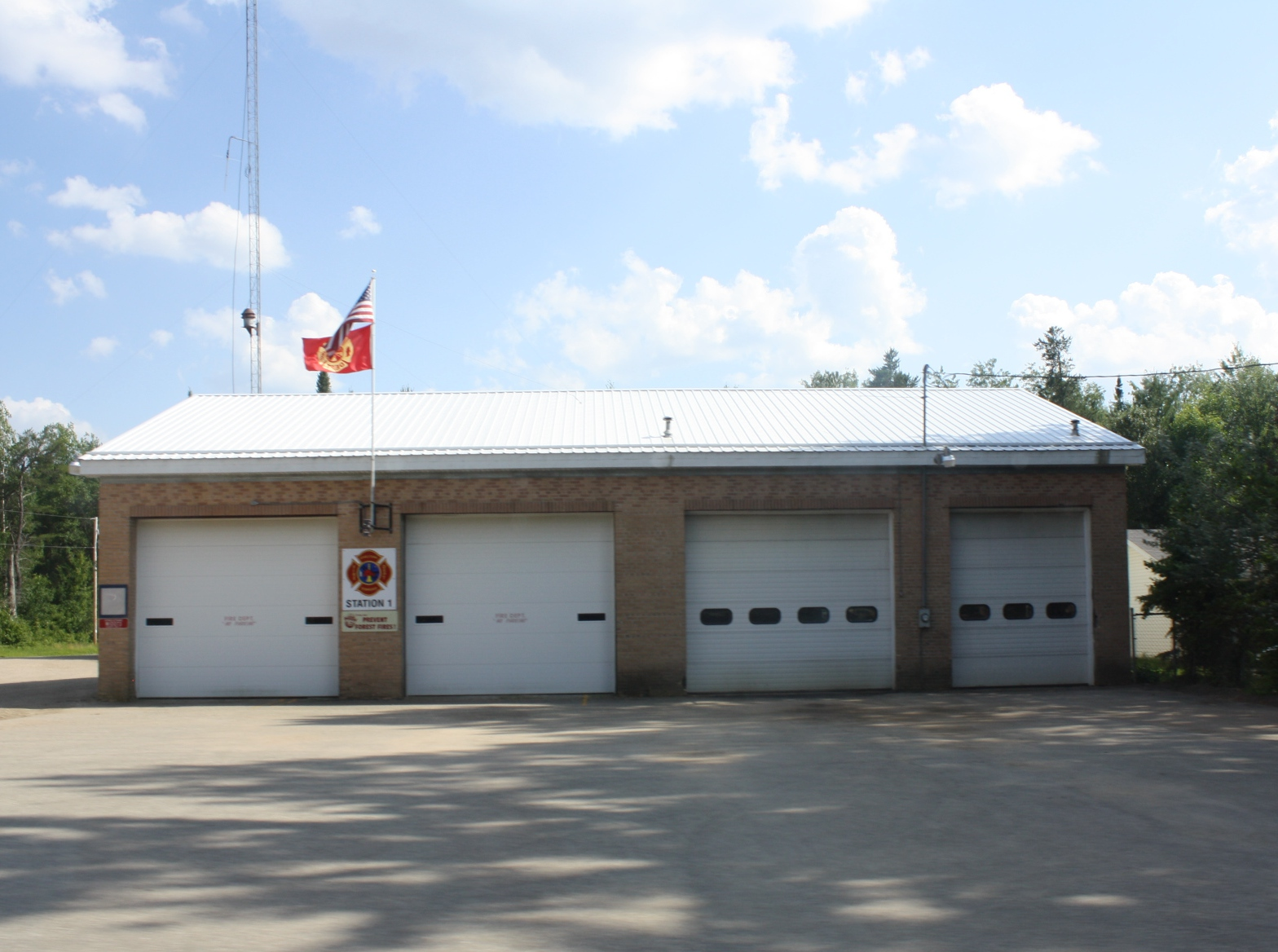
Fire department

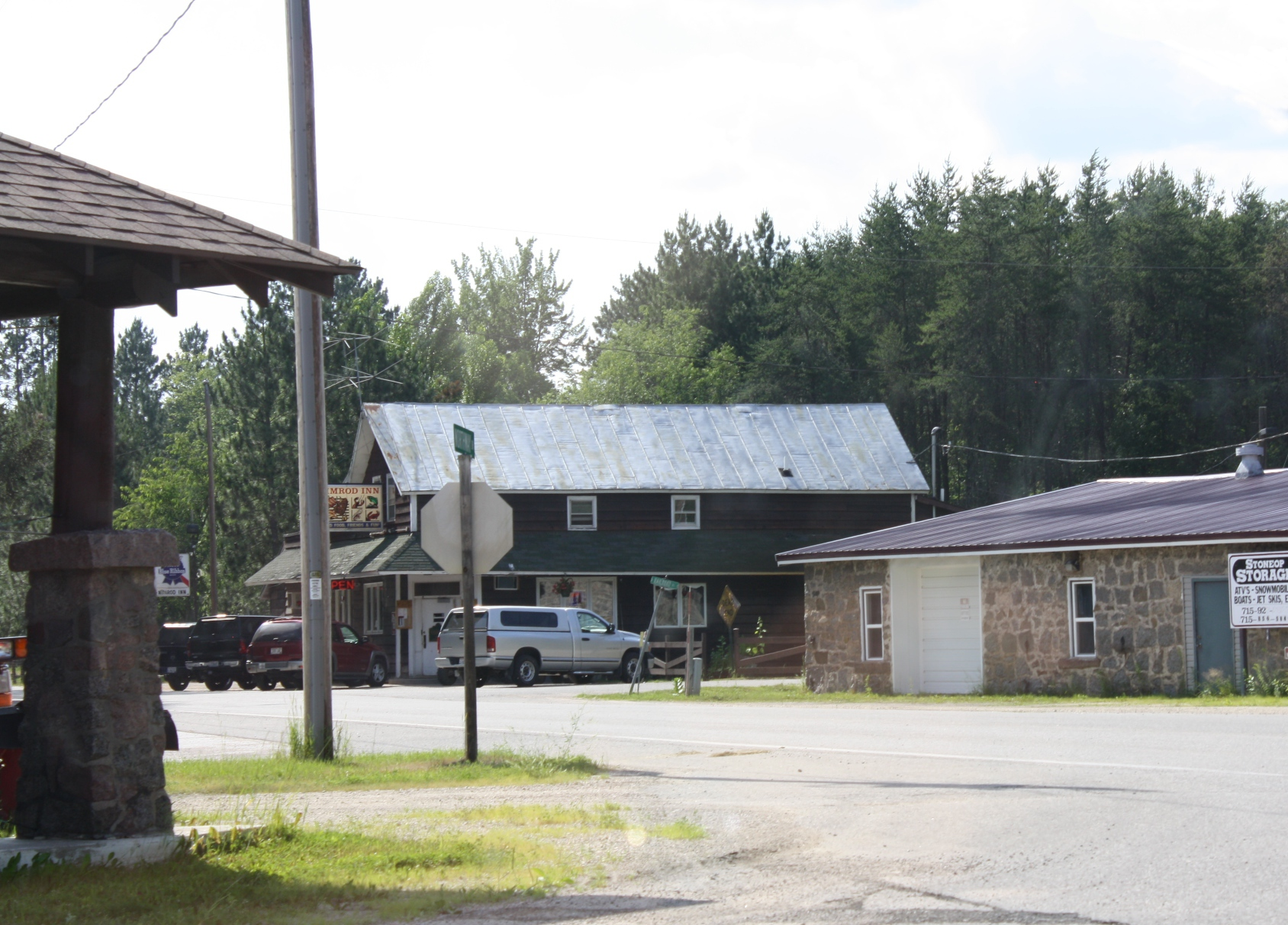
Looking west in the center of Athelstane

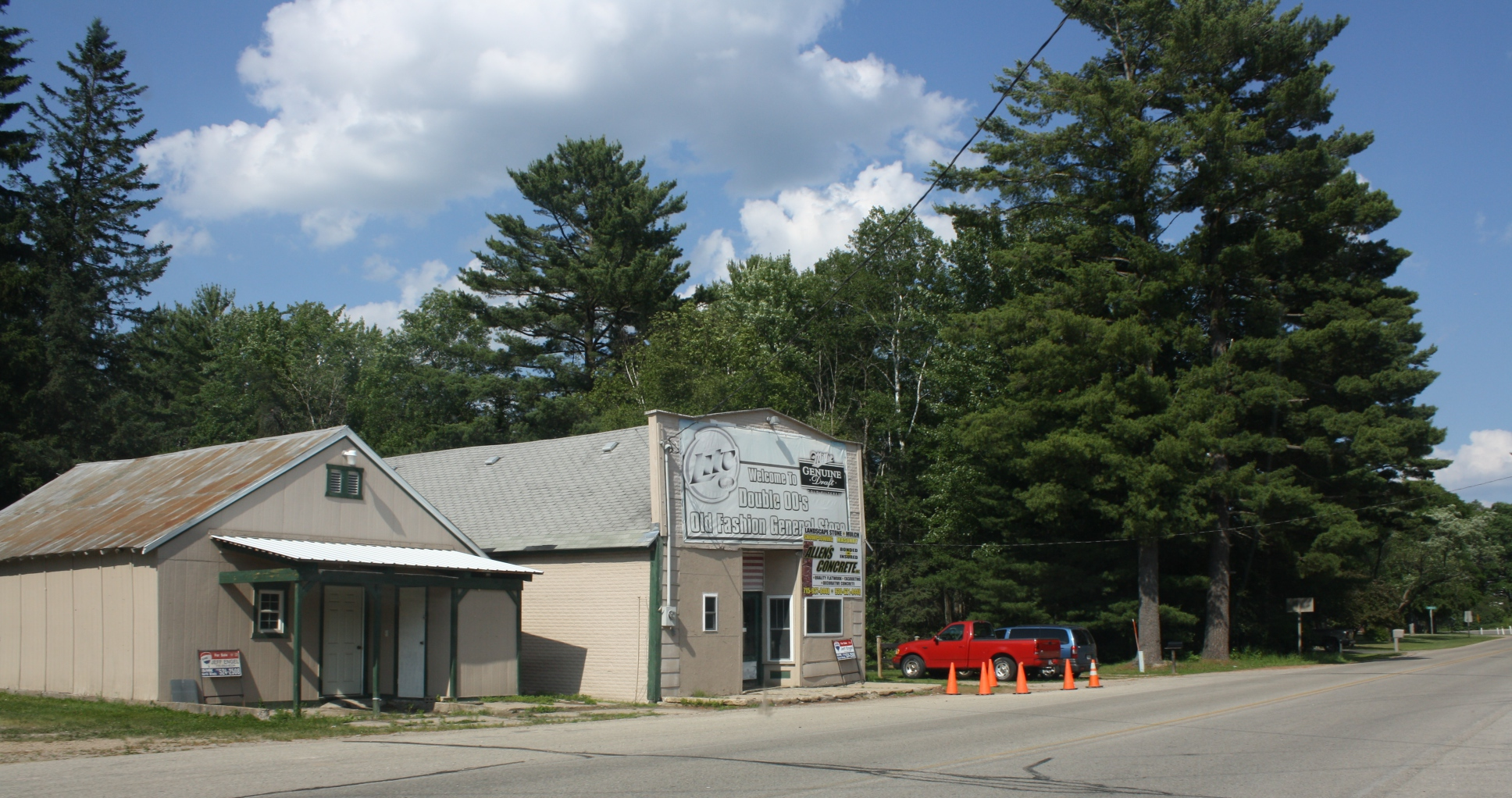
Looking east

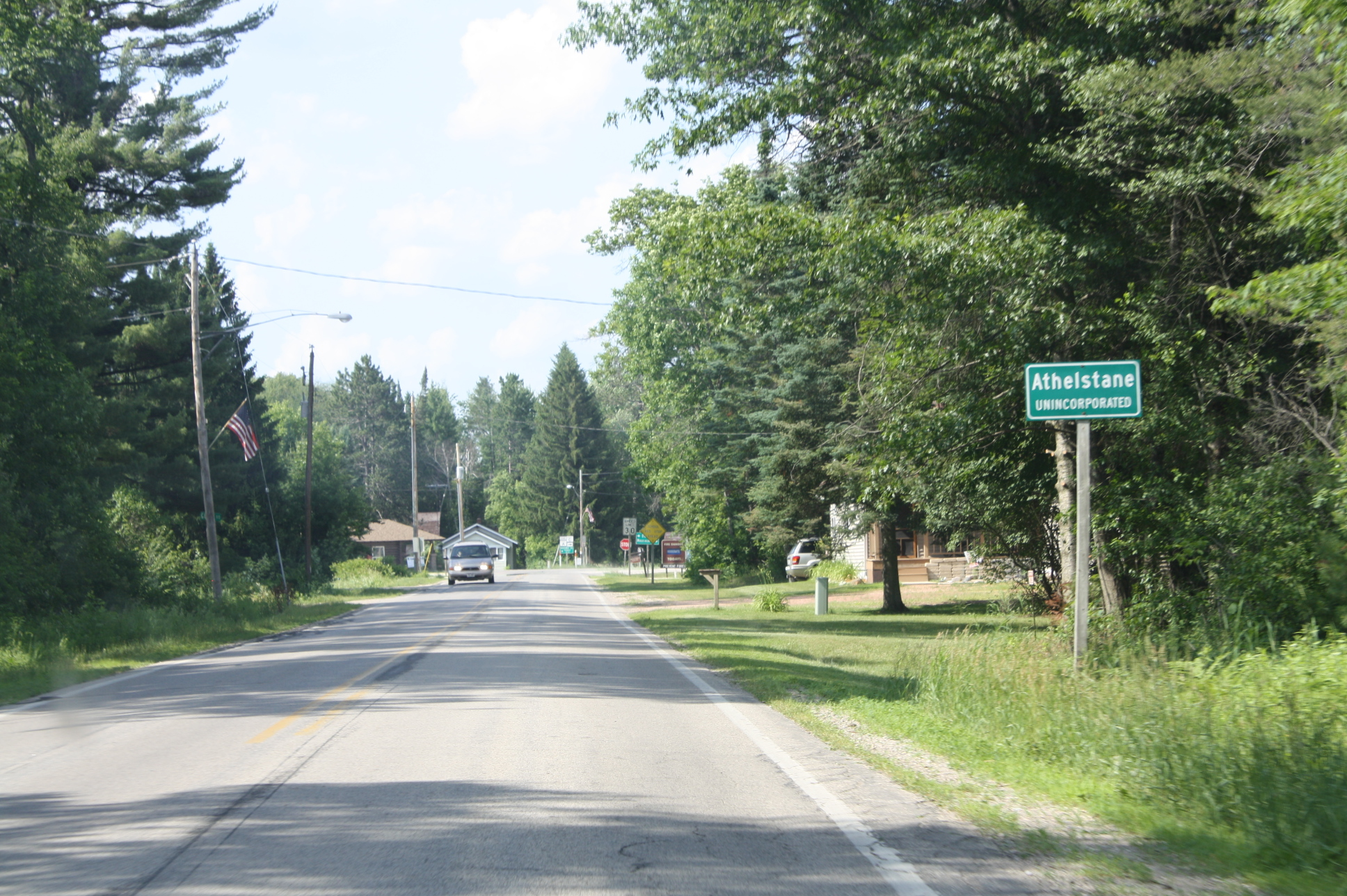
The sign for Athelstane
