= Æthelstan (name) =

Æthelstan was the first King of England, reigning from 924 to 939.

== People ==
Other notable people with this masculine given name include:

=== Mononym ===
- Æthelstan Ætheling, heir apparent to Æthelred the Unready
- Æthelstan (bishop of Elmham), 10th-century bishop
- Æthelstan (bishop of Hereford), 11th-century bishop
- Æthelstan Half-King, 10th-century ealdorman
- Æthelstan Mannessune, 10th-century landowner in the Fens
- Æthelstan of Abingdon, 11th-century abbot
- Æthelstan of East Anglia, 9th-century King of East Anglia
- Æthelstan of Kent, 9th-century sub-king of Kent, son of King Æthelwulf of Wessex
- Æthelstan of Ramsbury, 10th-century bishop
- Æthelstan of Sussex, 8th-century South Saxon monarch
- Æthelstan Rota, 10th-century ealdorman under King Eadwig and King Edgar
- Guthrum the Old, 9th-century Danish King of East Anglia, who converted to Christianity and was baptised as Æthelstan after his peace with Alfred the Great

=== Given name ===
- Athelstan Beckwith (1930–2010), Australian chemist
- Athelstan Jasper Blaxland (1880–1963), English consultant surgeon
- Athelstan Braxton Hicks (1854–1902), English coroner
- Athelstan Caroe (1903–1988), English merchant
- Athelstan Cornish-Bowden (1871–1942), South African surveyor
- Athelstan John Cornish-Bowden (b. 1943), British biochemist
- Athelstan Popkess (1895–1967), English police officer
- Athelstan Rendall (1871–1948), English politician
- Athelstan Rendall (pilot) (1914–2006), British pilot
- Athelstan Riley (1858–1945), English composer
- Athelstan Saw (1868–1929), Australian university administrator
- Athelstan Spilhaus (1911–1998), South African oceanographer

== Fictional characters ==
- Athelstane, in Ivanhoe by Sir Walter Scott
- Athelstan, in Vikings
- Athelstane King, in The Peshawar Lancers by S. M. Stirling
