= David Blaustein (educator) =

Russian-American rabbi, educator and social worker

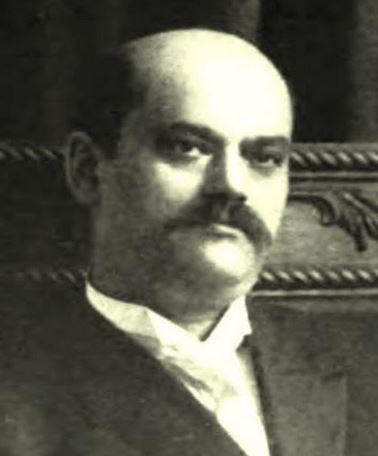
- Born: May 5, 1866; Lida, Russian Empire
- Died: August 26, 1912 (aged 46); Cold Spring, New York, US
- Occupations: Rabbi, educator, social worker

David Blaustein (May 5, 1866 – August 26, 1912) was a Belarusian-American rabbi, educator, and social worker.

== Life ==
Blaustein was born on May 5, 1866, in Lida, Vilna Governorate, Russian Empire, the son of Isaiah Blaustein and Sarah Natzkowsky.

Blaustein's father died when he was eight, and when he was seventeen he ran away from home and moved to Memel, Prussia to obtain an education. He then went to Schwerin, Mecklenburg-Schwerin and enrolled in a Jewish teacher's preparatory school under Dr. Fabian Feilchenfeld. He intended to be a cantor-shochet-teacher to German Jews, but when Otto von Bismarck banned Russian Jews from living in Germany he was forced to immigrate to America. He also studied Hebrew in the Lida heder and yeshiva, and when he first moved to Germany he studied Hebrew and rabbinical literature under Israel Lipkin. He came to America in 1886.

Blaustein initially settled in Boston, Massachusetts, where he started a Hebrew and German school and became active in educational and communal work. He began studying at Harvard College in 1889, graduating from there with an A.B. in 1893 and spending two more years there. He became rabbi of Congregation Sons of Israel and David in Providence, Rhode Island, in 1892, and from 1897 to 1898 he was a lecturer on Semitic languages at Brown University. Professor David G. Lyon was one of his professors at Harvard. While living in Providence, he systemized the charity work among the local Jewish congregations, invited professors from Harvard and Brown to give lectures, exchanged pulpits with several Christian ministers, and served on the Rhode Island State Charity Board. In 1898, he received an A.M. degree from Brown.

In 1898, Blaustein resigned as rabbi to become superintendent of the Educational Alliance in New York City, New York. A number of Lower East Side leaders didn't welcome his selection for the position, which led him to study the situation before instituting any definite policy in order to allay their fears. As part of that study, he undertook a survey of the neighborhood to determine how to best fit the Alliance's activities with the people's needs. He sought to bring opposing leaders and factions together in order to turn the alliance into a true community house and an example for other Jewish settlement houses. As superintendent, he faced a growing divide between the older and younger generations, and proved so unsatisfactory to more radical groups they formed a new institution called the Educational League as a protest against what they saw as his reactionary policy. He resigned from the Educational Alliance due to this dissension in 1907, and a year later he moved to Chicago, Illinois, and became superintendent of the Chicago Hebrew Institute. He again faced disfavor from radical groups, and when he refused to allow Emma Goldman to speak in the Institute they boycotted it. He resigned as superintendent in 1910 and spent the remaining two years of his life on social issues. From October 1911 to February 1912, he toured the country to study the immigrant Jewish problem and the Jewish situation more generally. One source described him as the first trained Jewish social worker.

In 1900, Blaustein accompanied Ellis Island Immigrant Commissioner Robert Watchorn to Romania in order to study conditions for Jews there and the causes of large-scale immigration from there. In 1905, he became first president of the Society of Jewish Social Workers of New York. An active Zionist, he was the first nasi of the Order of the Sons of Zion. In 1910, he began lecturing on Jewish, Italian, and Slavic immigration at the New York School of Philanthropy, where a chair was established for him. In 1910, he married Miriam Umstadter of Norfolk, Virginia. They had no children.

Blaustein died from apoplexy while staying at the Young Men's Hebrew Association Camp of the Educational Alliance at Cold Spring on August 26, 1912. Five separate funeral services were held for him, including at Congregation Poal Zedek Anshe Illie (where Rabbi Judah L. Magnes delivered a brief eulogy and the congregation's cantor Rabbi M. A. Siegel gave a prayer), the Educational Alliance (where Rabbi Zvi Hirsch Masliansky gave a eulogy, Rabbis Samuel Buchler and N. Abramson led the service, and the children's choir sang several of Blaustein's favorite hymns), the Hebrew Maternity Hospital (where the hospital's president Rabbi Philip Jaches spoke from the hospital steps), the Home for the Aged Daughters of Jacob (where Rabbi Solomon Mosesson, Rabbi David Robins, director Gussie Meyer, and executive committee chairman Annie Joseph took part in the services), and the Hebrew Sheltering House and Immigrant Aid Society (where its chaplain Rabbi B. Siegel offered a prayer). Thousands attended his funeral services, including delegations from various organizations and societies he identified with, with thousands more standing outside. He was buried in Washington Cemetery.
