= Goldfaden =

Goldfaden is a Jewish surname. Notable people with the surname include:

- Abraham Goldfaden (1840–1908), Russian-born Jewish poet and playwright
- Ben Goldfaden (1913–2013), American basketball player
- Itay Goldfaden (born 1996), Israeli swimmer
