= Pauline Edelstein =

Romanian-born American Yiddish theatre actress

Pauline Edelstein (February 10, 1866 – September 27, 1942) was a Yiddish theatre actress.

== Birth ==
Born Pauline Finkelstein, in Iași, Romania on February 10, 1866, and died September 27, 1942, in Manhattan, New York. Her father was a "cutter" by profession.

== Marriage ==
She was married to Joseph Edelstein, a Yiddish theatre owner, playwright and director. They had two children, Isidore Edelstein, who for a short time also acted in the Yiddish theatres, and Elias Edelstein, who worked with his father and later ran the Second Avenue Theater.

== Early life ==
She learned in a "primary school" with her sister Amalia. Amalia married actor Zigmund Mogulesko. Through her affiliation with her sister she entered the chorus of Mugulesko-Goldfaden's troupes in Romania and Russia. In Russia she acted as Genendl in Shom'r's Der Katorzhnik and as Tamar in Joseph Lateiner's Di libe fun tzion.

== America ==
In 1886 she emigrated to America with her husband and continued to act in Yiddish theatre mainly under the direction of her husband, Joseph Edelstein. She acted in character roles and was the first to act in the role of Mishke in Lateiner's operetta Mishke and Moshke, and in Jacob Gordin's (1853–1909) plays: Froy Rozenkrants in Siberia on November 13, 1891, in Jacob Adler's Union Theater; Zelda in Der vilder mentsh on November 4, 1893, in the Windsor Theatre, as Madam Zhamanuli in Devorahle myukhst in 1893; and as Freyde Henye in Dovidl mshurr in 1899.

In 1901 she guest-starred together with Boris and Bessie Thomashefsky in Berlin in Lateiner's Dovids fidele. After that, due to illness, she withdrew from the stage.

Both of her sisters, Amalia Mogulesko and Ernestine (Esther Finkelstein), for a short time acted on the Yiddish stage. Her son, Isidore Edelstein married Annie Thomashefsky, sister of Boris Thomashefsky.

== Death ==
She died on September 27, 1942, in New York.
