= Robert Edelstein =

American economist

Robert H. Edelstein is an American economist, currently the professor emeritus, Maurice Mann Chair in Real Estate at Haas School of Business, University of California at Berkeley. He graduated from Harvard University.
