= Wausaukee (town), Wisconsin =

Wausaukee, Wisconsin
- Town
- Town of Wausaukee
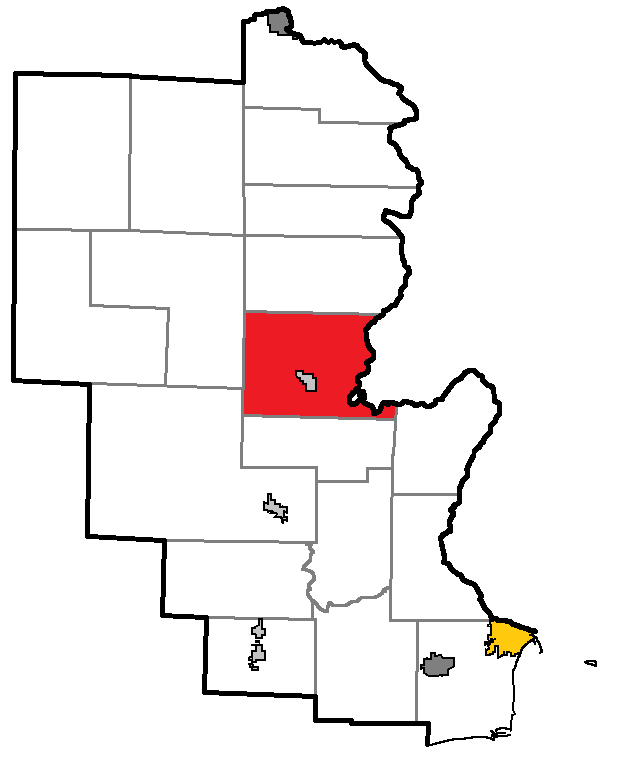
- Location of Wausaukee, within Marinette County
- Coordinates: 45°23′52″N 87°56′57″W
- Country: United States
- State: Wisconsin
- County: Marinette

Area
  - Total: 77.57 sq mi (200.9 km^{2})
  - Land: 75.73 sq mi (196.1 km^{2})
  - Water: 1.84 sq mi (4.8 km^{2})

Population (2020)
  - Total: 1,097
  - Density: 14.49/sq mi (5.593/km^{2})
- Time zone: UTC-6 (Central (CST))
  - Summer (DST): UTC-5 (CDT)
- Area code(s): 715 & 534
- GNIS feature ID: 1584382

Wausaukee is a town in Marinette County, Wisconsin, United States. The estimated population was 1,097 in the 2020 census. The Village of Wausaukee is located within the town. The unincorporated community of Cedarville is located partially in the town.

== Geography ==
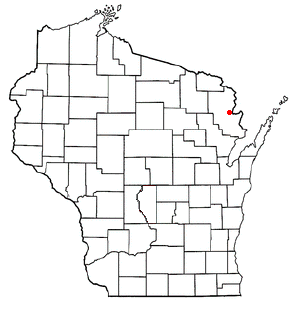
Location of Wausaukee (town), Wisconsin

According to the United States Census Bureau, the town has a total area of 77.4 square miles (200.6 km^{2}), of which 75.7 square miles (196.1 km^{2}) is land and 1.7 square miles (4.4 km^{2}) (2.21%) is water.

The Wausaukee River flows through the town and empties into the Menominee River.

== Demographics ==
As of the census of 2000, there were 1,196 people, 469 households, and 354 families residing in the town. The population density was 15.8 inhabitants per square mile (6.1/km^{2}). There were 1,036 housing units at an average density of 13.7 per square mile (5.3/km^{2}). The racial makeup of the town was 98.49% White, 0.08% Black or African American, 0.33% Native American, 0.33% Asian, 0.08% from other races, and 0.67% from two or more races. 0.42% of the population were Hispanic or Latino of any race.

There were 469 households, out of which 30.1% had children under the age of 18 living with them, 65.9% were married couples living together, 6.4% had a female householder with no husband present, and 24.5% were non-families. 20.9% of all households were made up of individuals, and 9.8% had someone living alone who was 65 years of age or older. The average household size was 2.55 and the average family size was 2.93.

In the town, the population was spread out, with 25.9% under the age of 18, 3.8% from 18 to 24, 23.3% from 25 to 44, 31.3% from 45 to 64, and 15.7% who were 65 years of age or older. The median age was 43 years. For every 100 females, there were 101.7 males. For every 100 females age 18 and over, there were 105.1 males.

The median income for a household in the town was $35,530, and the median income for a family was $39,375. Males had a median income of $32,337 versus $20,476 for females. The per capita income for the town was $18,610. About 2.9% of families and 5.5% of the population were below the poverty line, including 2.2% of those under age 18 and 7.1% of those age 65 or over.
