= Joseph Edelstein =

American theatre actor (1858–1940)

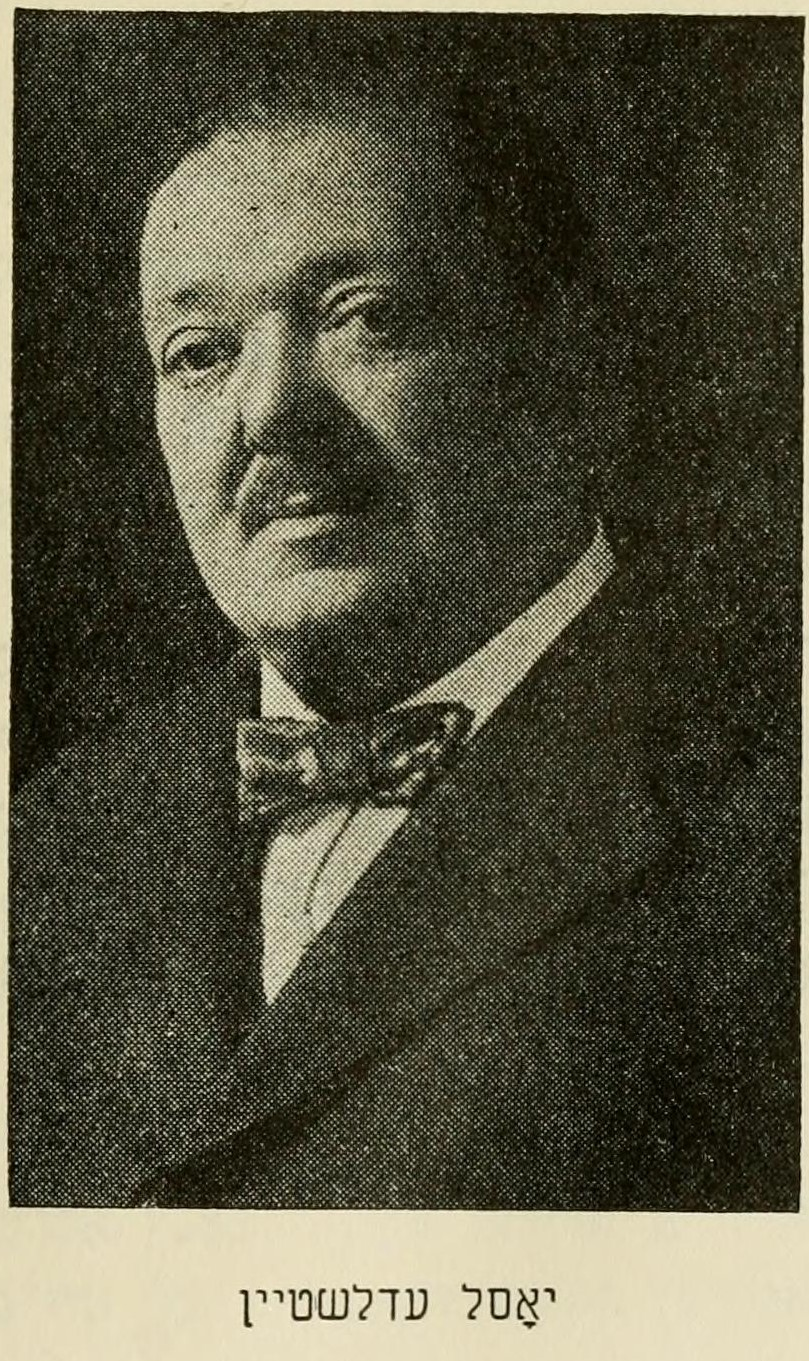
Joseph Edelstein, Yiddish theatre actor

Joseph Edelstein (Yiddish: יוסף עדלשטײן, 1858–1940) was an actor in Yiddish Theatre in America.

== Early life ==
Joseph (Yozef) Edelstein was born December 10, 1858, in Iasi, Principality of Wallachia (the area would become part of the United Principalities of Moldavia and Wallachia the next year). His father was a bookkeeper. As a small boy he went to "cheder". After completing primary school he attended a gymnasium. His father lent money to arriving folk singers and actors from Goldfaden's troupe. He came into contact with the actors of the "Yiddish theater". He was married to Pauline Finkelstein, who also acted in the Yiddish theatres. They had two children, Isidore and Elias. Isadore acted in the Yiddish theatres for a short time, and Elias worked with his father and later ran the Second Avenue Theater.

== America ==
He and his wife emigrated to America in 1886. He became a ticket controller, and in 1889 he became the manager of the Windsor Theatre. He was associated with David Kessler, Zigmund Feinman, Zigmund Mogulesko, Boris Thomashefsky, and Jacob Adler. He also managed the Thalia Theatre, and the People's Theatre.

In 1912, when the National Theatre was built, he entered into a partnership with Boris Thomashefsky, David Kessler, Max Wilner (1895-1956) in the National Theatre and Second Avenue Theatre in the Yiddish Theater District.

In 1919, he returned to become the manager of the Second Avenue Theatre until the 1931-1932 season. In the 1921-30 seasons he was partners with Joseph Rumshinsky, Jacob Kalich, Molly Picon, William Pasternak, Nathan Parnes and Max Seger, and one season with Maurice Schwartz.

In 1896, he traveled to Bucharest, and brought the actress Bertha Kalich to America. From Lemberg he brought the actor Karl Shramek.

He died on September 24, 1940.
