= SS Athelstane (1941) =

Tanker built in 1941

History
- Name: Empire Flint (1941–44); Athelstane (1945–52); Oakley (1952–62)
- Owner: Ministry of War Transport (1941–45); Athel Line Ltd (1945–52); Skibs A/S Vaholm (1952–57); Holmens Rederi A/S & Vaboens Rederi A/S (1957–59); H A Moller A/S (1959–62)
- Operator: Anglo-Saxon Petroleum Co Ltd (1941–45); United Molasses Co Ltd (1945–52); Holmen & Vaboen (1952–57); Holmens Rederi A/S & Vaboens Rederi A/S (1957–59); Torvold Klaveness (1959–62)
- Port of registry: London, United Kingdom (1941–52); Kristiansand, Norway (1952–62)
- Builder: Swan, Hunter & Wigham Richardson Ltd
- Yard number: 1601
- Launched: 29 March 1941
- Completed: August 1941
- Maiden voyage: 29 August 1941
- Out of service: February 1962
- Identification: United Kingdom Official Number 165814 (1941–52); Code Letters BCKS (1941–52); Code Letters LALH (1952–62)
- Fate: Scrapped

General characteristics
- Class & type: Tanker
- Tonnage: 8,129 GRT; 4,630 NRT; 11,952 DWT
- Length: 483 ft 1 in (147.24 m) overall; 468 ft 4 in (142.75 m) between perpendiculars
- Beam: 59 ft 4 in (18.08 m)
- Draught: 27 ft 6.75 in (8.40 m)
- Depth: 33 ft 8 in (10.26 m)
- Installed power: 629 nhp triple expansion steam engine
- Propulsion: Single screw propeller
- Speed: 11.25 knots (20.84 km/h)

Athelstane was an 8,129 GRT tanker that was built in 1941 as Empire Flint by Swan, Hunter & Wigham Richardson, Wallsend, England for the Ministry of War Transport (MoWT). She was sold to Athel Line Ltd in 1945 and renamed Athelstane. She was sold to Skibs A/S Vaholm in 1952 and renamed Oakley. Sold to H A Moller A/S in 1959, she served until 1962 when she was scrapped.

== Description ==
The ship was built in 1941 by Swan, Hunter & Wigham Richardson, Wallsend, England. She was yard number 1601.

The ship was 483 ft 1 in (147.24 m) long overall (468 ft 4 in (142.75 m) between perpendiculars), with a beam of 59 feet 4 inches (18.08 m). She had a depth of 33 feet 8 inches (10.26 m) and a draught of 27 feet 6.75 inches (8.40 m). She was assessed at 8,129 GRT, 4,630 NRT, 11,952 DWT.

The ship was propelled by a 629 nhp triple expansion steam engine, which had cylinders of 26½ inches (60 cm)26.5 inches (67 cm), 44 inches (110 cm) and 73 inches (190 cm) diameter by 48 inches (120 cm) stroke. The engine was built by Swan, Hunter & Wigham Richardson. It drove a single screw propeller. The engine could propel the ship at a speed of 11.25 knots (20.84 km/h).

== History ==
The ship was built by Swan, Hunter & Wigham Richardson Ltd, Wallsend, Northumberland, United Kingdom for the MoWT. She was launched on 29 March 1941 and completed in August 1941. The Code Letters BCKS and United Kingdom Official Number 165814 were allocated. Her port of registry was London. She was operated under the management of Anglo-Saxon Petroleum.

Empire Flint departed from the Tyne on 29 August 1941 to join Convoy EC 66, which had sailed from Southend, Essex the previous day and arrived at the Clyde on 2 September. She left the convoy at Loch Ewe on 1 September and sailed to New York, United States, where she arrived on 19 September. Laden with avgas, Empire Flint sailed on 27 September for Halifax, Nova Scotia, Canada, arriving two days later. She departed on 5 October with Convoy HX 153, which arrived at Liverpool, Lancashire on 19 October. She left the convoy and arrived at the Clyde on 17 October.

Empire Flint sailed on 1 November to join Convoy ON 32, which departed from Liverpool that day and arrived at Halifax on 16 November. Her destination was Curaçao, Netherlands Antilles, which was reached on 23 November. Laden with a cargo of petrol, Empire Flint sailed the next day for Halifax, arriving on 3 December. She sailed with Convoy HX 164 on 8 December. The convoy arrived at Liverpool on 23 December. Empire Flint arrived at the Belfast Lough that day.

Empire Flint sailed on 31 December to join Convoy ON 52, which had departed from Liverpool that day and dispersed at sea on 11 January 1942. She arrived at Halifax on 17 January. Laden with petrol, she returned with Convoy HX 174, which sailed on 7 February and arrived at Liverpool on 21 February.

Empire Flint was a member of Convoy OS 21, which sailed from Liverpool on 4 March and arrived at Freetown, Sierra Leone on 24 March. She was in ballast and bound for Aruba, Netherlands Antilles, which was reached on 26 March. She sailed two days later for Takoradi, Gold Coast, where she arrived on 15 April. Empire Flint sailed on 18 April for Lagos, Nigeria, arriving the next day. She departed on 23 April for Trinidad, which was reached on 10 May. A cargo of petrol was loaded. Sailing five days later, she arrived at Freetown on 28 May. Empire Flint sailed on 4 June with Convoy SL 112, which arrived at Liverpool on 23 June. She left the convoy at the Belfast Lough on 22 June, sailing the next day with Convoy BB 190, which arrived at Milford Haven, Pembrokeshire the next day. Her destination was Avonmouth, Somerset, which was reached on 25 June.

Empire Flint sailed on 27 June for Barry, Glamorgan, arriving two days later. She departed on 14 July and arrived at Milford Haven on 16 July. She sailed that day to join Convoy ON 113, which departed from Liverpool on 17 July and arrived at Halifax on 31 July. She was carrying 9,000 tons of fresh water and 9 passengers. She was bound for New York. Empire Flint sailed from the Hampton Roads on 13 August with Convoy KS 530, which arrived at Key West, Florida on 18 August. She sailed on 21 August with Convoy WAT 16, which arrived at Trinidad on 31 August. She arrived at Curaçao on 20 August. She loaded a cargo of petrol. Empire Flint was a member of Convoy AH 3, which sailed on 2 September and arrived at Halifax on 10 September. She departed the next day with Convoy HX 207, which arrived at Liverpool on 25 September.

Empire Flint was a member of Convoy ON 137, which sailed from Liverpool on 9 October and arrived at New York on 29 October. She sailed on 2 November for New Orleans, Louisiana, where she arrived on 10 November. She later sailed to Pilottown, Louisiana, from where she departed on 16 November with Convoy PK 119, which arrived at Key West on 19 November. She then joined Convoy KG 613, which sailed that day and arrived at Guantanamo Bay, Cuba on 23 November. Empire Flint was a member of Convoy GZ 13, which departed on 24 November and arrived at Cristóbal, Colón, Panama on 27 November. Shen sailed to Balboa, from where she departed on 28 November for Cape Town, South Africa, arriving on 30 December.

Empire Flint spent the first quarter of 1943 sailing independently. She departed from Cape Town on 4 January for East London, where she arrived on 8 January. She sailed ten days later for Cape Town, arriving on 19 January. Empire Flint sailed on 22 January for Takoradi, Gold Coast, arriving on 7 February and sailing two days later for Lagos, Nigeria. She arrived on 11 February and sailed for Marshall, Liberia six days later. Empire Flint sailed on 24 February for Trinidad, where she arrived on 10 March. She joined Convoy TAG 48, which sailed on 15 March and arrived at Guantanamo Bay on 20 March. She then joined Convoy GN 48, which sailed that day and arrived at New York on 28 March. Empire Flint was carrying a cargo of petrol. She joined Convoy HX 232, which sailed on 1 April and arrived at Liverpool on 16 April.

Empire Flint departed on 30 April with Convoy ON 181, which arrived at New York on 18 May. She could not maintain 9.5 knots (17.6 km/h) and left the convoy at 55°55′N 8°19′W and headed for the Clyde, where she arrived on 2 May. She sailed on 6 May to join Convoy ON 182, which had sailed from Liverpool that day and arrived at New York on 22 May. Empire Flint sailed on 3 June for Philadelphia, Pennsylvania, arriving later that day. She sailed three days later and arrived back at New York on 8 June. Carrying avgas, Empire Flint joined Convoy HX 244, which departed on 15 June and arrived at Liverpool on 30 June. She left the convoy at the Belfast Lough on 29 June and joined Convoy BB 304, which sailed that day and arrived at Milford Haven on 1 July. Her final destination was Swansea, Glamorgan where she arrived that day.

Empire Flint departed from Swansea on 6 July and arrived at Milford Haven the next day. She sailed on 8 July to join Convoy ON 192, which sailed from Liverpool on 9 July and arrived at New York on 22 July. She then joined Convoy NG 376, which sailed from New York on 26 July and arrived at Guantanamo Bay on 2 August. Empire Flint then joined Convoy GAT 78, which departed that day and arrived at Trinidad on 8 August. She left the convoy at Curaçao on 6 August, sailing on 10 August to join Convoy GAT 79, which had departed from Guantanamo Bay on 7 August and arrived at Trinidad on 13 August. Empire Flint joined Convoy TAG 79, which departed on 17 August and arrived at Guantanamo Bay on 22 August. She then joined Convoy GN 79, which sailed that day and arrived at New York on 29 August. Carrying petrol and paraffin, she sailed on 2 September with Convoy HX 255, which arrived at Liverpool on 16 September. She left the convoy and put into Loch Ewe, where she arrived on 15 September. Empire Flint joined Convoy WN 480, which sailed on 16 September and arrived at Methil, Fife on 18 September. She then joined Convoy FS 1224, which sailed that day and arrived at Southend, Essex on 20 September.

Empire Flint departed from Southend on 24 September with Convoy FN 1134A, which arrived at Methil on 25 September. She left the convoy at the River Tyne that day, sailing on 1 October to join Convoy FN 1140, which had departed from Southend on 30 September and arrived at Methil on 2 October. She then joined Convoy EN 289, which sailed that day and arrived at Loch Ewe on 4 October. Empire Flint joined Convoy ON 205, which sailed from Liverpool on 5 October and arrived a New York on 23 October. She arrived at Philadelphia that day. She sailed on 30 October for New York, arriving the next day. Carrying petrol, Empire Flint joined Convoy HX 264, which sailed that day and arrived at Liverpool on 17 November. She sailed on to Milford Haven, arriving on 18 November and then joining Convoy WP 433, which sailed that day and arrived at Portsmouth, Hampshire on 20 November. She left the convoy at Brixham, Devon, arriving on 20 November.

Empire Flint departed from Brixham on 22 November to join Convoy PW 434. On paper, the convoy had departed from Portsmouth on 21 November and arrived at Milford Haven on 23 November. However, Empire Flint was the only ship in the convoy. She arrived at Falmouth, Cornwall on 23 November. She sailed on 2 December to join Convoy PW 439. Like Convoy PW434, she was the only ship in the convoy, which was scheduled to have departed from Portsmouth on 1 December. She arrived at Milford Haven on 3 December. She sailed on 8 December to join Convoy ON 215, which departed from Liverpool on 9 December and arrived at New York on 28 December. Empire Flint arrived at Philadelphia that day.

Empire Flint departed from Philadelphia on 1 January 1944 for the Hampton Roads, where she arrived the next day. She then joined Convoy UGS 29, which sailed on 5 January and arrived at Alexandria, Egypt on 31 January. She left the convoy at Casablanca, Morocco, where she arrived on 22 January. Empire Flint sailed on 27 January to join Convoy OS 65, which had formed at sea on 26 January and arrived at Freetown on 6 February. She then joined Convoy STL 11, which departed on 9 February and arrived at Takoradi on 13 February. She sailed on to Accra, Gold Coast, arriving the next day. Empire Flint departed on 16 February for Takoradi, arriving the next day. She sailed on 29 February for Lagos, where she arrived on 2 March. She departed with Convoy LTS 13 on 12 March, which arrived at Freetown on 19 March. Empire Flint left the convoy at Takoradi on 14 March and then sailed to Freetown and Trinidad, arriving on 31 March. She joined Convoy TAG 125, which departed on 3 April and arrived at Guantanamo Bay on 7 April. She left the convoy and put into Curaçao, where she arrived on 5 April, sailing four days later for Guantanamo Bay, where she arrived on 12 April. Empire Flint then joined Convoy GN 126, which departed on 13 April and arrived at New York on 20 April. Carrying gasoil and benzene, she departed with Convoy HX 289 on 27 April and arrived at Liverpool on 13 May. She sailed on to Swansea, arriving the next day.

Empire Flint then sailed to Barry, Glamorgan, from where she joined Convoy EBC 20 which departed on 23 June and arrived at the Seine Bay on 25 June. She returned to British waters with Convoy FBC 13, which departed on 29 June and arrived in the Bristol Channel on 1 July. She put into Barry, from where she departed on 27 July with Convoy EBC 54, which arrived in the Seine Bay on 29 July. She then sailed to Portland, Dorset, from where she joined Convoy EBC 81 on 24 August. That convoy had departed from Barry on 23 August and arrived at the Seine Bay on 25 August. Empire Flint was probably a member of Convoy FBC 73, which departed from the Seine Bay on 4 September and arrived in the Bristol Channel on 6 September. She arrived at Swansea on 6 September and then sailed to Barry. She departed on 26 September with Convoy EBC 115, which was bound for the Seine Bay. Empire Flint left the convoy and arrived at Hamble, Hampshire on 27 September. She sailed two days later to join Convoy FBC 97, which had departed from the Seine Bay that day and arrived in the Bristol Channel on 1 October. She arrived at Swansea that day. Empire Flint sailed for Milford Haven on 7 October, arriving later that day.

Empire Flint sailed on 8 October to join Convoy ON 258, which had departed from Southend on 6 October and arrived at New York on 24 October. Carrying diesel and cased petrol, she returned with Convoy HX 317, which sailed on 30 October and arrived at Liverpool on 13 November. Empire Flint left the convoy and sailed to Southend, arriving on 13 November. She sailed the next day with Convoy FN 1541, which arrived at Methil on 16 November. She left the convoy and arrived at Salt End, Yorkshire on 15 November. She sailed five days later to join Convoy FS1641, which had departed from Methil on 19 November and arrived at Southend on 21 November. She then joined Convoy ON268, which sailed on 23 November and arrived at New York on 10 December.

Carrying petrol, Empire Flint sailed on 8 January 1945 with Convoy HX 331, which arrived at Liverpool on 22 January. She left the convoy and arrived at the Clyde on 22 January. She sailed on 3 February with Convoy JW 64, which arrived at the Kola Inlet on 15 February. Her destination was Molotovsk, where she arrived that day. Empire Flint departed from the Kola Inlet on 23 February with Convoy RA 65, which arrived at Loch Ewe on 1 April. She arrived at the Clyde that day and sailed two days later for Liverpool, where she arrived on 3 April.

Empire Flint departed on 12 April with Convoy ON 296, which arrived at New York on 30 April. Carrying petrol, she returned with Convoy HX 354, which sailed on 3 May and arrived at Liverpool on 15 May. On 22 May, she sailed to join her final convoy, ON 304, which had departed from Southend on 21 May and arrived at New York on 5 June. She sailed to the Delaware Capes, departing on 9 June for Marseille, Bouches-du-Rhône, France, where she arrived on 25 June. She sailed four days later for Cape Henry, Virginia, United States, arriving on 15 July. Empire Flint then sailed to Swansea, where she arrived on 16 August. She departed on 23 August for Hamburg, Germany, arriving on 27 August. She left Hamburg on 30 August and is known to have departed from the Tyne on 8 October and Curaçao on 29 October.

In 1945, Empire Flint was sold to Athel Line Ltd and was renamed Athelstane, the fourth ship of that name. She was operated under the management of the United Molasses Co Ltd. In 1952, she was sold to Skibs A/S Vaholm, Kristiansand, Norway and was renamed Oakley. Her port of registry was Kristiansand and the Code Letters LALH were allocated. She was operated under the management of Holmen & Vaboen. In 1957, she was owned and operated by Holmens Rederi A/S & Vaboens Rederi A/S, Kristiansand. Oakley was sold in 1959 to Harald A. Moller A/S, Oslo and operated under the management of Torvald Klaveness, Oslo. She was scrapped in February 1962 by Eckhardt & Co, Hamburg, West Germany.
