= Wausaukee, Wisconsin =

- Village
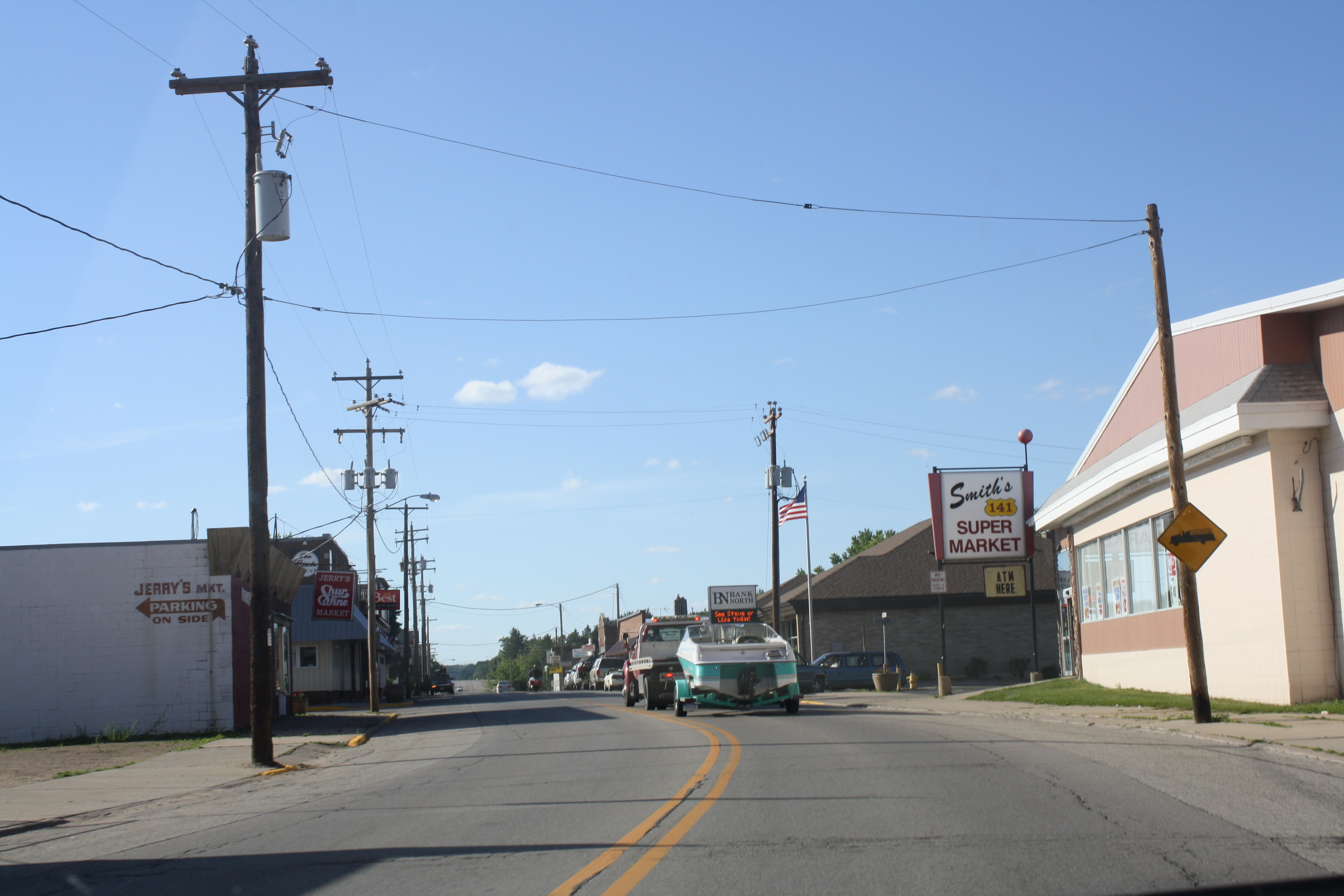
- U.S. Route 141 in Wausaukee, Wisconsin

- Location of Wausaukee in Marinette County, Wisconsin.
- Coordinates: 45°24′N 87°55′W
- Country: United States
- State: Wisconsin
- County: Marinette

Area
  - Total: 1.39 sq mi (3.60 km^{2})
  - Land: 1.37 sq mi (3.56 km^{2})
  - Water: 0.012 sq mi (0.03 km^{2})
- Elevation: 774 ft (236 m)

Population (2020)
  - Total: 596
  - Density: 433/sq mi (167.2/km^{2})
- Time zone: UTC-6 (Central (CST))
  - Summer (DST): UTC-5 (CDT)
- Area codes: 715 & 534
- FIPS code: 55-84550
- GNIS feature ID: 1576328

Wausaukee is a village in Marinette County, Wisconsin, United States. The population was 596 at the 2020 census. The village is part of the Marinette, WI–MI Micropolitan Statistical Area.

== History ==
Wausaukee is an Ojibwe word meaning 'distant land' (< wassa 'distant' + aki 'land'), or a Menominee word that means 'river among the hills'. The town was started in 1863 by John S. Monroe, who bought 160 acres of land from business tycoon Lars Kovala and built a mill to supply the railroads with lumber for bridges and culverts. His first building was a log cabin home that was also used to board the mill workers. As the town grew and more settlers moved in, his log cabin grew into an inn that was the only public eating establishment north of Green Bay.

On August 19, 2011, at 4:45pm, an EF1 tornado struck Wausaukee. One fatality was recorded.

== Geography ==
Wausaukee is located at 45°23′N 87°57′W (45.3767, -87.9561).

According to the United States Census Bureau, the village has a total area of 1.39 square miles (3.60 km^{2}), of which 1.38 square miles (3.57 km^{2}) is land and 0.01 square miles (0.03 km^{2}) is water.

The Wausaukee River flows through the village into the Menominee River.

== Demographics ==
Historical population
Census	Pop.	Note	%±
1930	663		—
1940	655		−1.2%
1950	612		−6.6%
1960	608		−0.7%
1970	557		−8.4%
1980	648		16.3%
1990	656		1.2%
2000	572		−12.8%
2010	575		0.5%
2020	596		3.7%
U.S. Decennial Census

=== 2010 census ===
As of the census of 2010, there were 575 people, 275 households, and 145 families living in the village. The population density was 410.7 inhabitants per square mile (158.6/km^{2}). There were 325 housing units at an average density of 232.1 per square mile (89.6/km^{2}). The racial makeup of the village was 95.7% White, 1.2% Native American, 0.2% Asian, 0.5% from other races, and 2.4% from two or more races. Hispanic or Latino of any race were 2.8% of the population.

There were 275 households, of which 25.8% had children under the age of 18 living with them, 33.5% were married couples living together, 12.7% had a female householder with no husband present, 6.5% had a male householder with no wife present, and 47.3% were non-families. 41.8% of all households were made up of individuals, and 24% had someone living alone who was 65 years of age or older. The average household size was 2.09 and the average family size was 2.78.

The median age in the village was 43.3 years. 22.8% of residents were under the age of 18; 7.8% were between the ages of 18 and 24; 21.6% were from 25 to 44; 25.2% were from 45 to 64, and 22.4% were 65 years of age or older. The gender makeup of the village was 48.7% male and 51.3% female.

=== 2000 census ===
As of the census of 2000, there were 572 people, 251 households, and 150 families living in the village. The population density was 402.4 inhabitants per square mile (155.4/km^{2}). There were 294 housing units at an average density of 206.8 per square mile (79.8/km^{2}). The racial makeup of the village was 96.50% White, 0.87% Black or African American, 22.22% Native American, 0.17% from other races, and 1.22% from two or more races. 0.87% of the population were Hispanic or Latino of any race.

There were 251 households, out of which 28.7% had children under the age of 18 living with them, 43.0% were married couples living together, 13.5% had a female householder with no husband present, and 40.2% were non-families. 35.9% of all households were made up of individuals, and 20.3% had someone living alone who was 65 years of age or older. The average household size was 2.27 and the average family size was 2.97.

In the village, the population was spread out, with 26.2% under the age of 18, 7.2% from 18 to 24, 22.9% from 25 to 44, 21.9% from 45 to 64, and 21.9% who were 65 years of age or older. The median age was 40 years. For every 100 females, there were 84.5 males. For every 100 females age 18 and over, there were 75.8 males.

The median income for a household in the village was $25,313, and the median income for a family was $35,833. Males had a median income of $30,313 versus $20,417 for females. The per capita income for the village was $13,098. About 17.5% of families and 23.0% of the population were below the poverty line, including 36.8% of those under age 18 and 11.3% of those age 65 or over.

== Notable people ==
- Harlan P. Bird, Wisconsin State Senator
- Lyle Mays, jazz pianist and composer with the Pat Metheny Group, was born in Wausaukee.
- Zachary A. Vane, Washington State Legislator and businessman

== Images ==
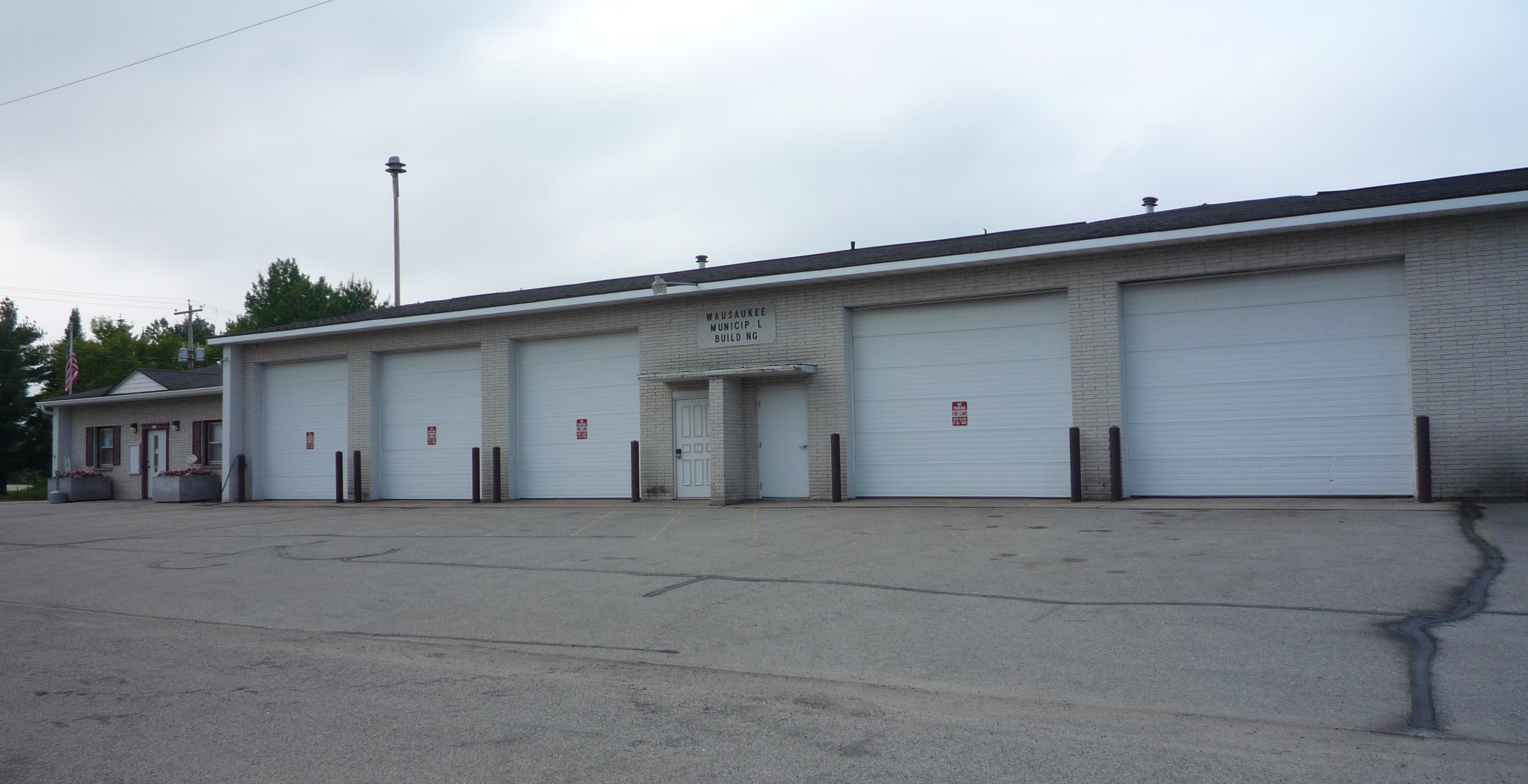
Municipal building and town hall.

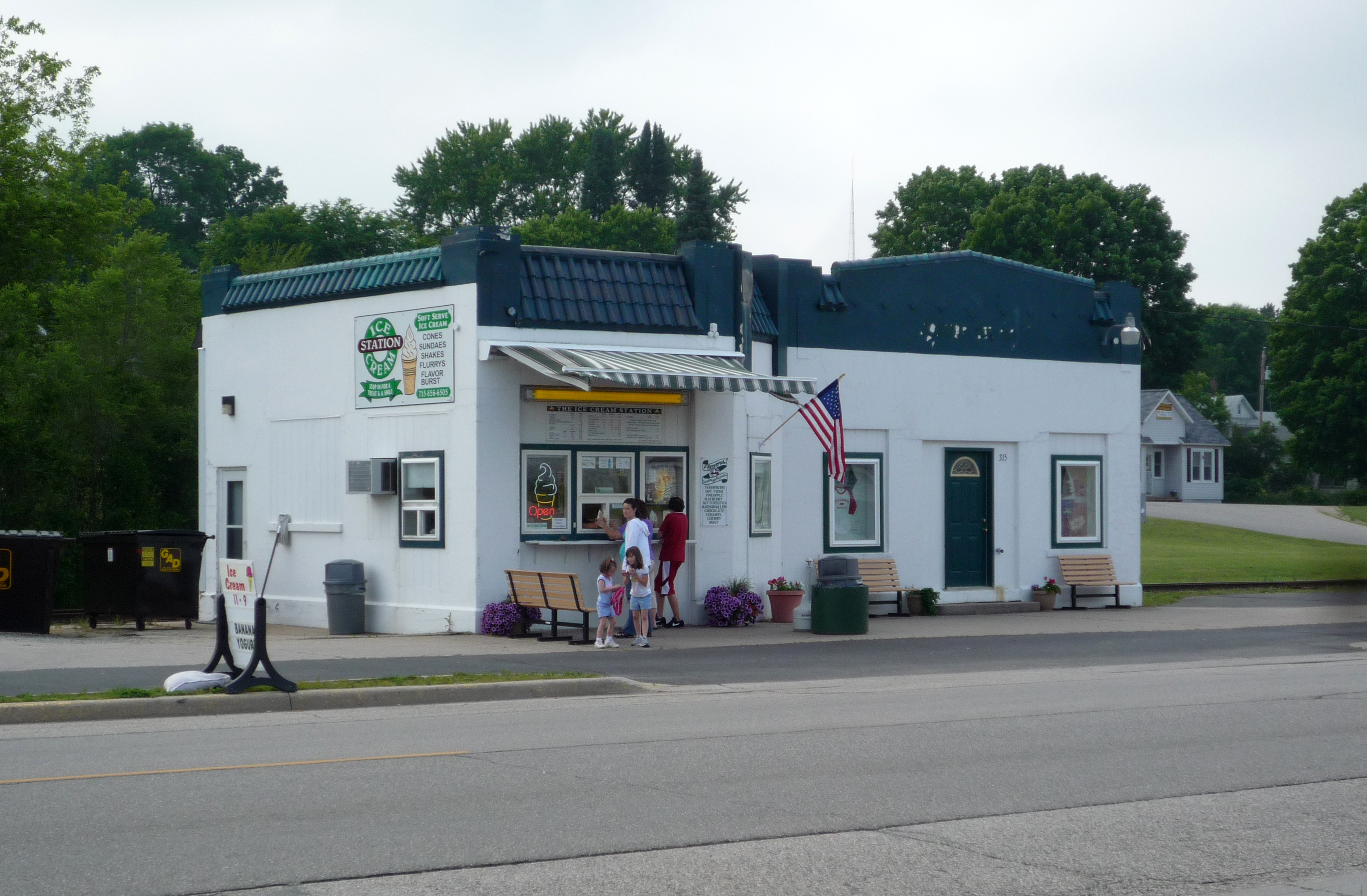
The Ice Cream Station is a seasonally open destination in downtown Wausaukee.

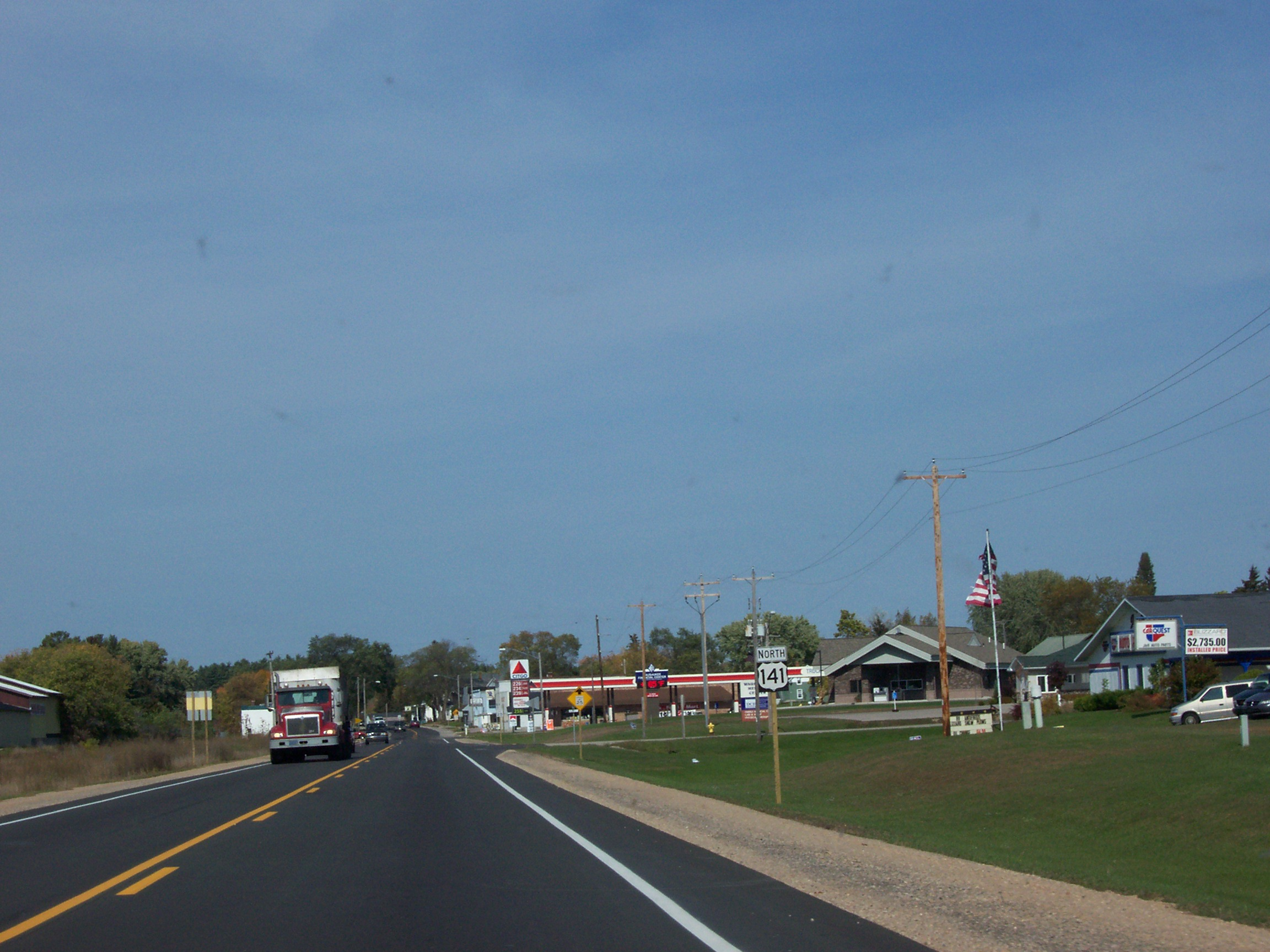
U.S. Route 141 in Wausaukee, Wisconsin

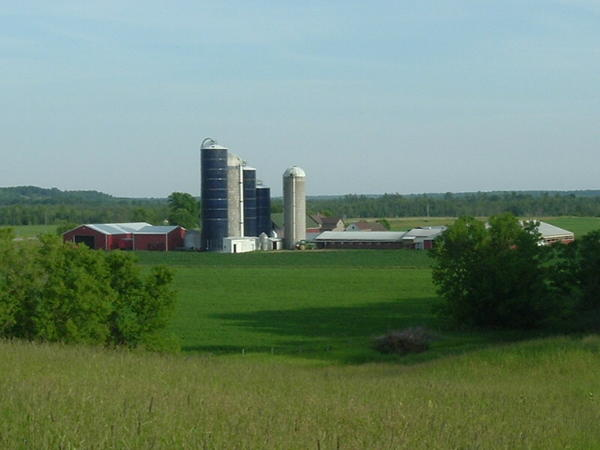
Wausaukee is surrounded by fertile soil and farms.

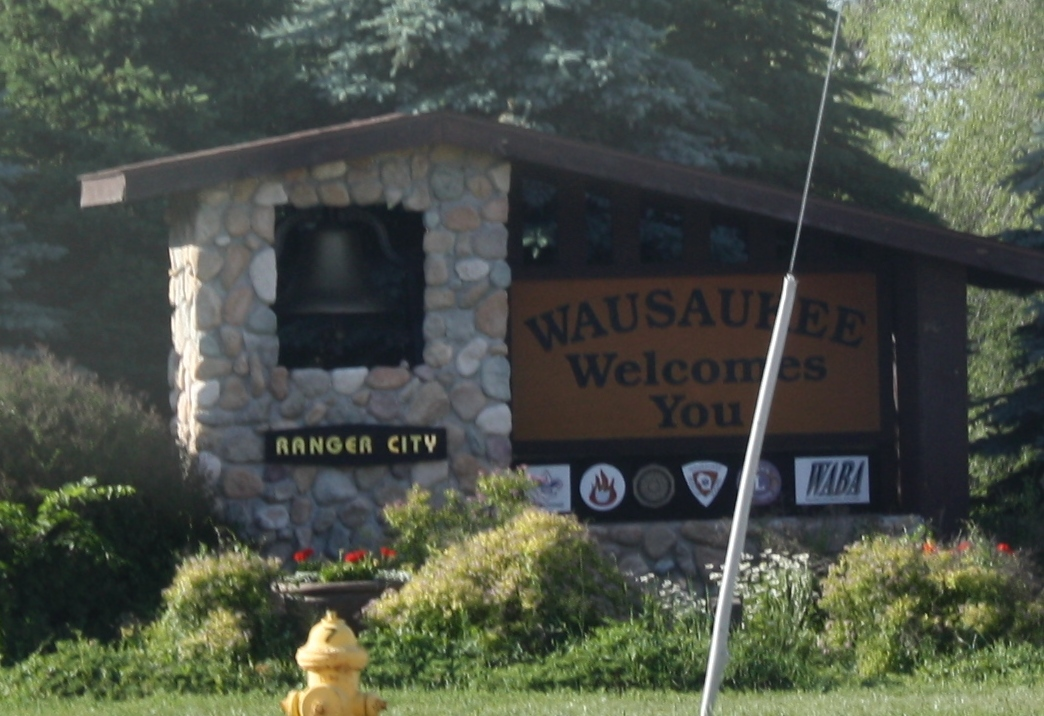
City welcome sign

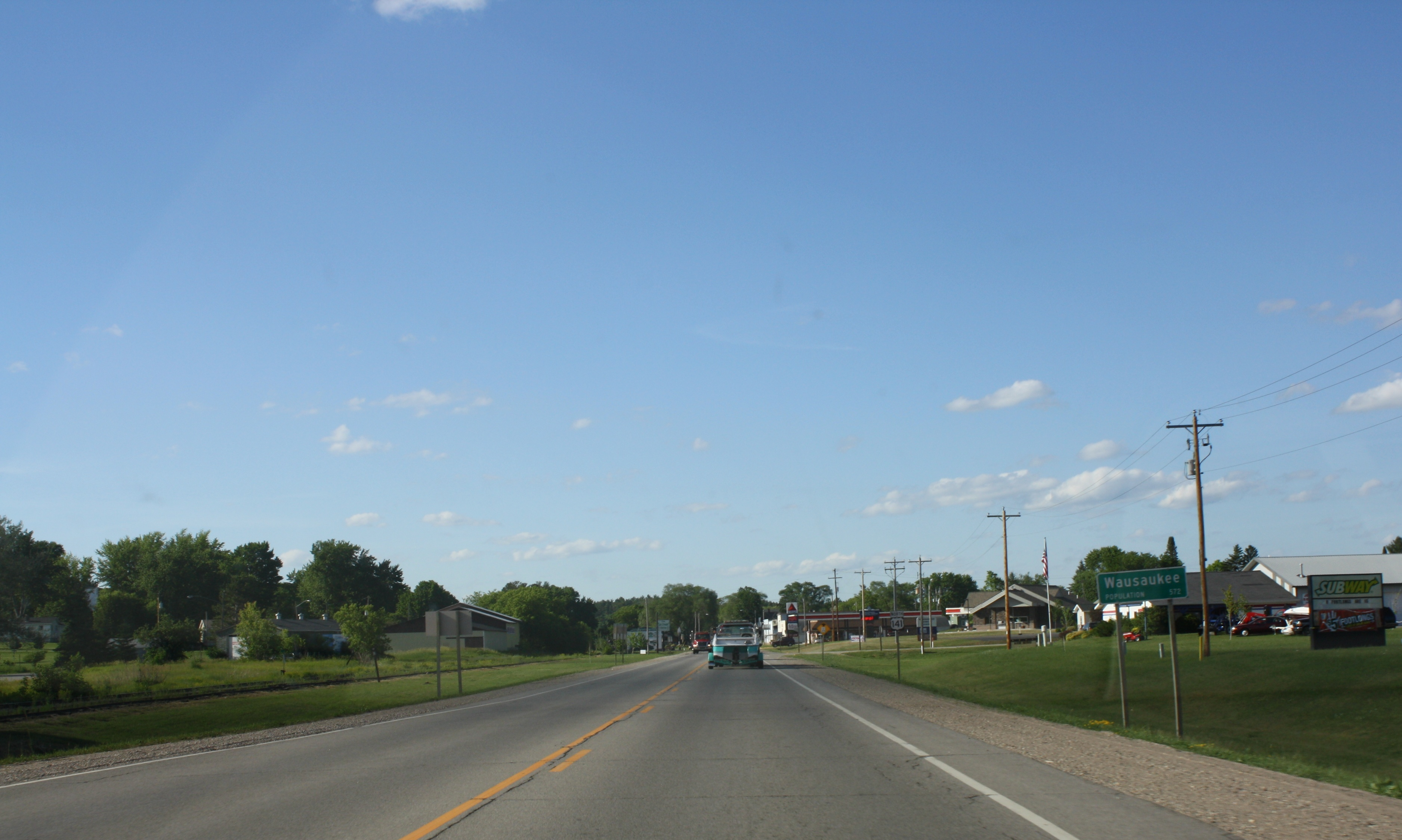
Looking north while entering Wausaukee

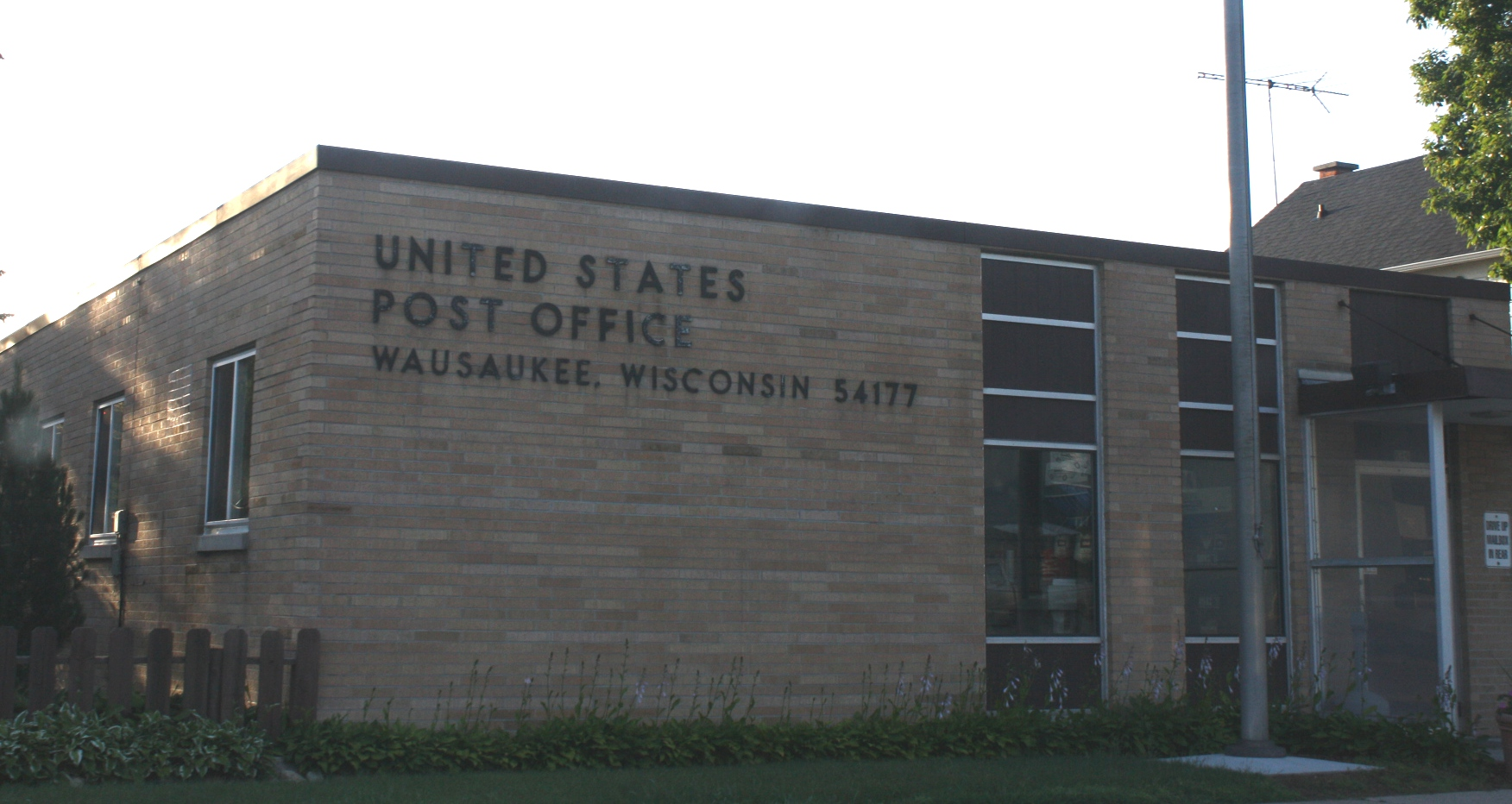
Post office

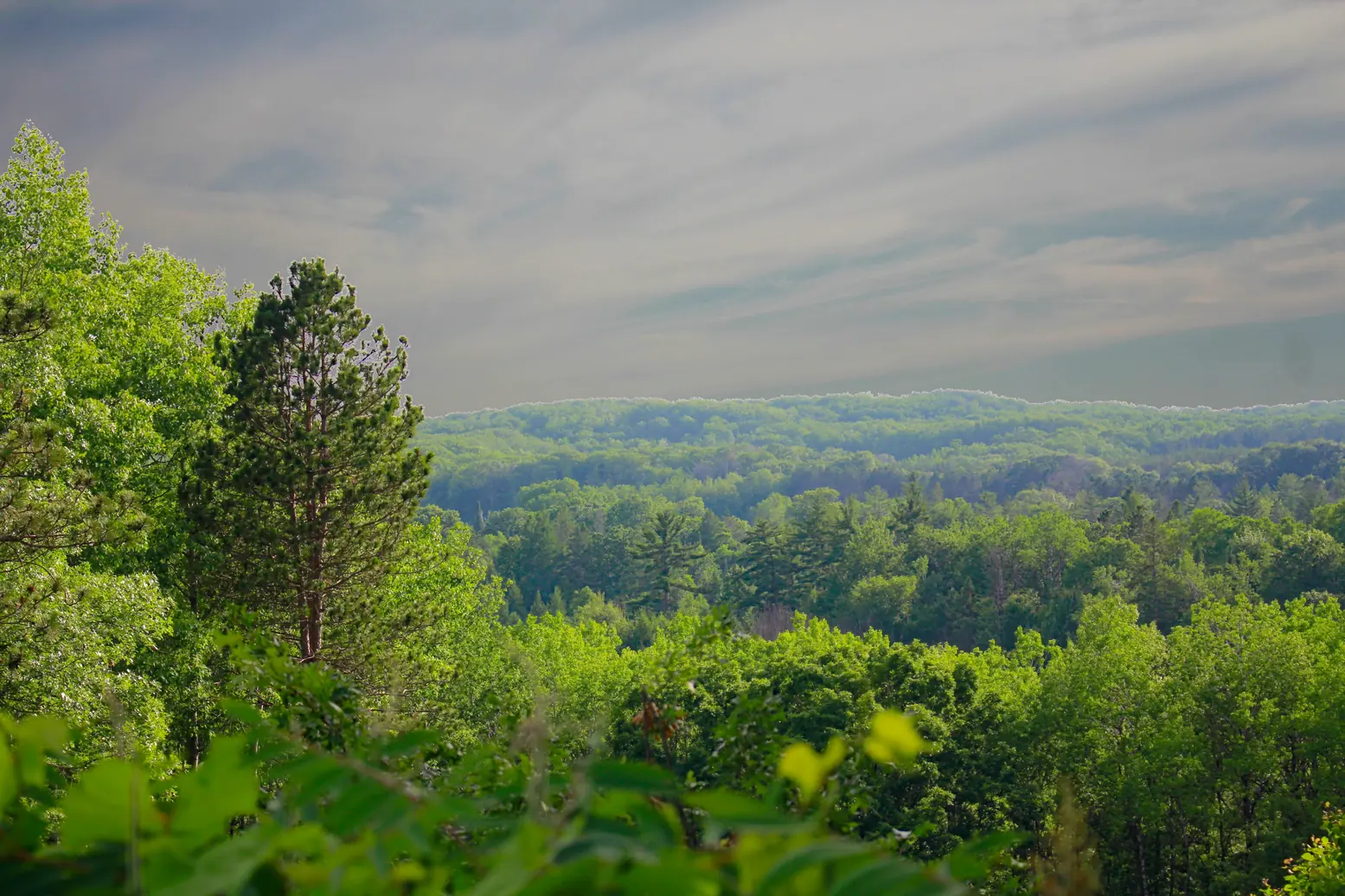
The woodlands near Wasaukee, Wisconsin, USA.
