= County Road 186 (Delta County, Michigan) =

Former state highway in Delta County, Michigan, United States

County Road 186
- Brampton 27.5 Road
- CR 186 highlighted in red

Route information
- Maintained by DCRC
- Length: 4.402 mi (7.084 km)
- Existed: July 26, 1939–present

Major junctions
- West end: M-35 in Brampton
- East end: US 2 / US 41 in Rapid River

Location
- Country: United States
- State: Michigan
- County: Delta

Highway system
- Delta County Roads
← M-185	M-186	→ M-186

County Road 186 (CR 186, Co. Rd. 186) is a primary county road in Delta County, Michigan, United States. It runs along Brampton 27.5 Road from M-35 in Brampton to US Highway 2/US Highway 41 (US 2/US 41) at Rapid River. The roadway was previously a state highway called M-186 from 1932 until July 1939, when it was transferred by the Michigan State Highway Department (MSHD) to the control of the Delta County Road Commission (DCRC). The commission initially refused to accept jurisdiction of the roadway for nearly seven months, resulting in an orphan road that was not being maintained by any agency until the legal dispute was settled.

== Route description ==
CR 186 starts at an intersection with M-35 in Brampton Township just north of the community of Brampton and runs eastward through woodlands along Brampton 27.5 Road. The roadway curves northward around a bend in the Days River and then turns southeasterly. CR 186 passes to the south of Brampton Lake before turning due east into Rapid River. The road turns 90° south along a segment of South 75 Road to terminate an at intersection with US 2/US 41 just west of the intersection where those two highways merge in Rapid River. Most of the length of the roadway is in the Escanaba River State Forest.

== History ==
M-186
- Location: Brampton–Rapid River
- Length: 4.478 mi (7.207 km)
- Existed: October 27, 1932–July 26, 1939

In September 1932, the MSHD announced the construction of a state highway in Delta County to serve as a shortcut between M-35 at Brampton and US 2/US 41 at Rapid River. The rural highway served westbound traffic on US 2 headed north on M-35, providing those motorists with a shortcut instead of driving south to M-35 at Gladstone, and the state planned to upgrade an existing trail at the location. On October 27, the state included the number M-186 in an announcement of road projects, budgeting $50,000 (equivalent to $934,000 in 2024) for its construction. The state advertised for bids on the upgraded roadway that November. M-186 debuted on the state highway map on May 1, 1934.

The highway was transferred from state control to the DCRC on July 26, 1939. In late 1939, State Highway Commissioner Murray D. Van Wagoner proposed the transfer of another 212 miles (341 km) of highways in Northern Michigan back to county control. Van Wagoner had described traffic levels on the roadways as insufficient to justify their status as a state highway. These highways did not have the same traffic levels as the rest of the system, averaging just 156 vehicles per day compared to 1,070 vehicles for the rest of the state. Transferring the roadways would save the State Highway Department $300,000 (equivalent to $5.29 million in 2024) in maintenance costs per year as well. The transfer of these additional highways was approved by the State Administrative Board on December 23, 1939, although the board found itself in the middle of a controversy as the county road commissions refused to accept control of the roadways, even though they automatically became county roads upon transfer and cancellation as state trunklines. The Missaukee County Road Commission refused to accept the transfer of M-74 at that time, and the Delta County Road Commission restated their refusal to accept jurisdiction over M-186, resulting in a pair of orphan roads that were not being maintained by any road agency. Van Wagoner stated at the time, "[A]s far as I'm concerned, those are county roads now and the counties will have to maintain them."

The next month, Van Wagoner and the Missaukee County prosecutor appealed to the state Attorney General Thomas Read to settle the status of the roadways. The prosecutor claimed that the commissioner lacked the authority to transfer an entire highway to local control. Read refused to settle the dispute on February 5 and referred the matter to the courts instead. As part of this dispute in early 1940, the road went unplowed, causing issues for residents living along the former highway. The MSHD plowed the road on February 9, clearing it of snow for the first time in 40 days. The department did this after eight children had been out of school for two weeks. The DCRC dropped their objections to the transfer on February 10, 1940, and accepted jurisdiction at that time. The designation was reused for a different highway in Grand Traverse County later that year.

== Junction list ==
The entire highway is in Delta County.

Location	mi	km	Destinations	Notes
Brampton Township	0.000	0.000	M-35 – Gwinn, Gladstone	
Masonville Township	4.402	7.084	US 2 / US 41 / LMCT – Escanaba, Manistique	
1.000 mi = 1.609 km; 1.000 km = 0.621 mi
