= Fife Lake =

Fife Lake can refer to:

- Fife Lake, Michigan, a village in Michigan, United States
- Fife Lake (Michigan), a lake in Michigan, United States
- Fife Lake Township, Michigan, Michigan, United States
- Fife Lake, Saskatchewan, a hamlet in Saskatchewan, Canada
- Fife Lake (Saskatchewan), a lake in Saskatchewan, Canada

== See also ==
- Fife (disambiguation)
