= M-186 (Michigan highway) =

State highway in Grand Traverse County, Michigan, United States

M-186
- M-186 highlighted in red

Route information
- Maintained by MDOT
- Length: 2.493 mi (4.012 km)
- Existed: 1940–present

Major junctions
- West end: M-113 near Kingsley
- East end: US 131 in Fife Lake

Location
- Country: United States
- State: Michigan
- Counties: Grand Traverse

Highway system
- Michigan State Trunkline Highway System; Interstate; US; State; Byways
← M-186	→ M-188

M-186 is a state trunkline highway in the US state of Michigan. Entirely within Fife Lake Township, in southeastern Grand Traverse County, the highway serves as a short connector between M-113 near Kingsley and US Highway 131 (US 131) at the village of Fife Lake. The current incarnation of M-186 is the second usage of the designation, as it was originally used for a highway in Delta County in the 1930s.

== Route description ==
M-186 forms an easterly extension of M-113 from Kingsley to Fife Lake. The highway starts south of a 90-degree curve in M-113 and runs east through flat, wooded terrain to Fife Lake. The roadway runs parallel to the survey section lines in Fife Lake Township, and it passes several residences along the whole length. From the eastern terminus, State Street connects M-186 and US 131 with downtown Fife Lake.

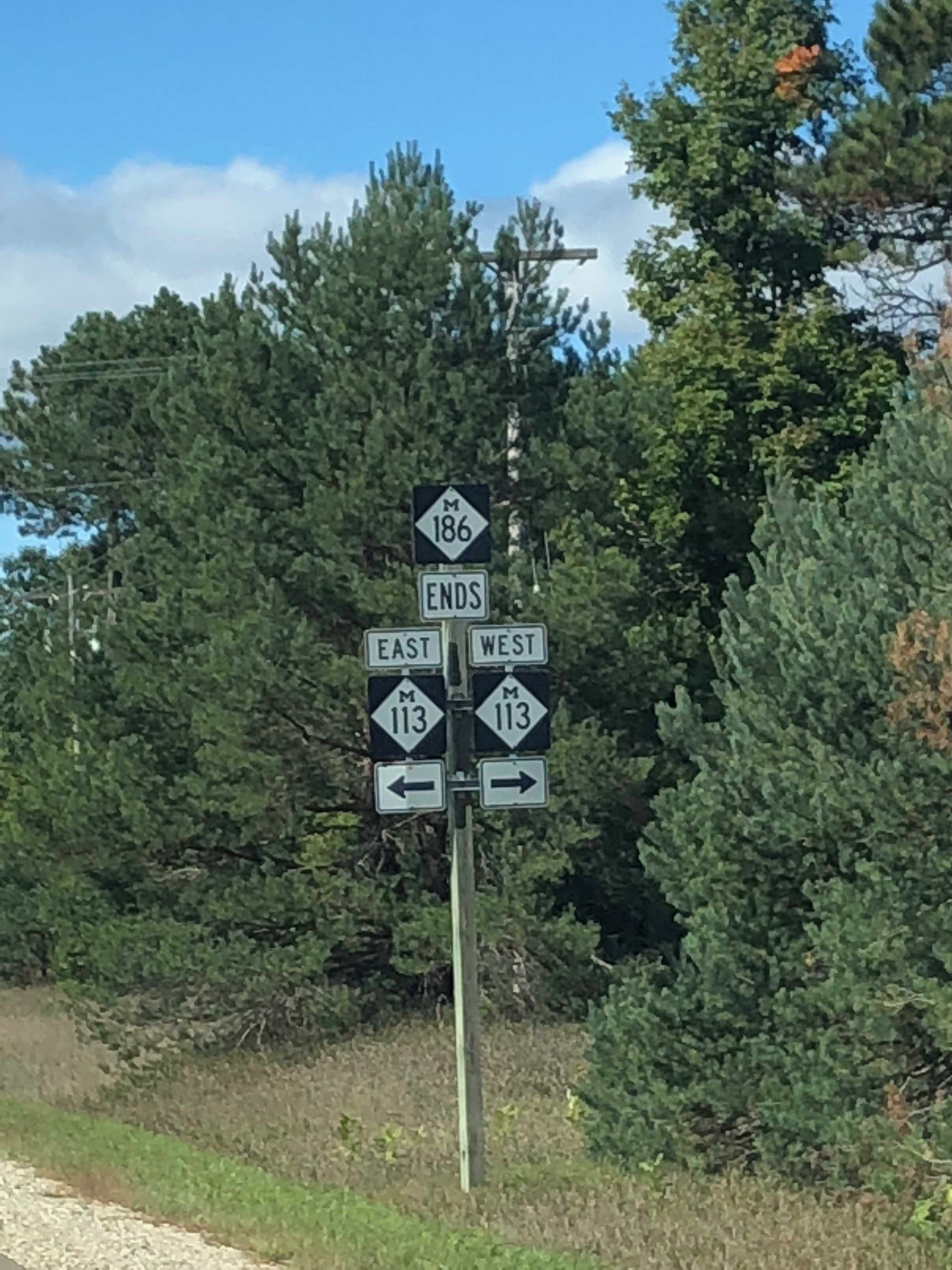
M-186 at its western terminus, M-113, near Fife Lake

In 2007, the average annual daily traffic (AADT) surveys conducted by the Michigan Department of Transportation (MDOT) showed that 2,100 vehicles used M-186. M-113 west of M-186 logged an average of 7,800 vehicles a day north of the junction and 4,400 vehicles south of the junction. On the east end, US 131 carried 5,100 vehicles north and 4,800 vehicles south of the junction in Fife Lake. Of the 2,100 vehicles on M-186, only 140 trucks travelled the highway each day on average.

== History ==
=== Previous designation ===
In the 1930s, M-186 was previously designated on a 4.3-mile (6.9 km) connector route in the Upper Peninsula between US 2/US 41 at Rapid River and M-35 near Brampton. This designation existed from 1932 until July 26, 1939, forming a route for westbound US 2 traffic to access M-35 northbound towards Gwinn and Negaunee.

=== Current designation ===
In 1940, US 131 ended at a three-way convergence with M-113 and M-131 four miles (6 km) north of Walton Junction in Paradise Township. From this intersection, US 131 ran south to Walton Junction, M-113 ran west to Kingsley, and M-131 ran east toward Fife Lake before turning north to Petoskey. A new alignment of US 131 was built from Walton Junction directly to Fife Lake. This formed a third leg of a triangle of roads, allowing US 131 to bypass the Paradise Township intersection. US 131 replaced M-131 north from Fife Lake to Petoskey. M-113 was extended along the former section of US 131 south to Walton Junction. The remaining leg of the triangle from Paradise Township to Fife Lake along a portion of the former M-131 was designated M-186 at this time.

In 2017, MDOT announced plans to build a roundabout at the eastern terminus of M-186 at US-131. This is the result of many crashes at this intersection (nearly 80 from 2007 to 2017), many of which because of low visibility. The project's plan called for starting and completing it in the first half of 2019, but by June the project had a projected completion date of July 27. Crashes and injuries at the intersection declined after it opened to traffic.

== Major intersections ==
The entire highway is in Fife Lake Township, Grand Traverse County.

mi	km	Destinations	Notes
0.000	0.000	M-113 – Kingsley	
2.493	4.012	US 131 – Cadillac, Kalkaska, Petoskey	
1.000 mi = 1.609 km; 1.000 km = 0.621 mi
