= Bloomfield Township, Michigan =

Bloomfield Township is the name of some places in the U.S. state of Michigan:

- Bloomfield Township, Huron County, Michigan
- Bloomfield Township, Missaukee County, Michigan
- Bloomfield Township, Oakland County, Michigan

== See also ==
- Bloomfield Hills, Michigan
- Blumfield Township, Michigan
- Bloomfield Township (disambiguation)
