= Bloomfield Township, Kansas =

Bloomfield Township, Kansas may refer to:

- Bloomfield Township, Mitchell County, Kansas
- Bloomfield Township, Sheridan County, Kansas

== See also ==
- List of Kansas townships
- Bloomfield Township (disambiguation)
