= Springfield Township, Michigan =

Springfield Township is the name of some places in the U.S. state of Michigan:

- Springfield Township, Kalkaska County, Michigan
- Springfield Township, Oakland County, Michigan

== See also ==
- Springfield, Michigan, a city in Calhoun County
