= Walton, Michigan =

Unincorporated community in Grand Traverse County, Michigan

Walton, Michigan Walton Junction
- Unincorporated community
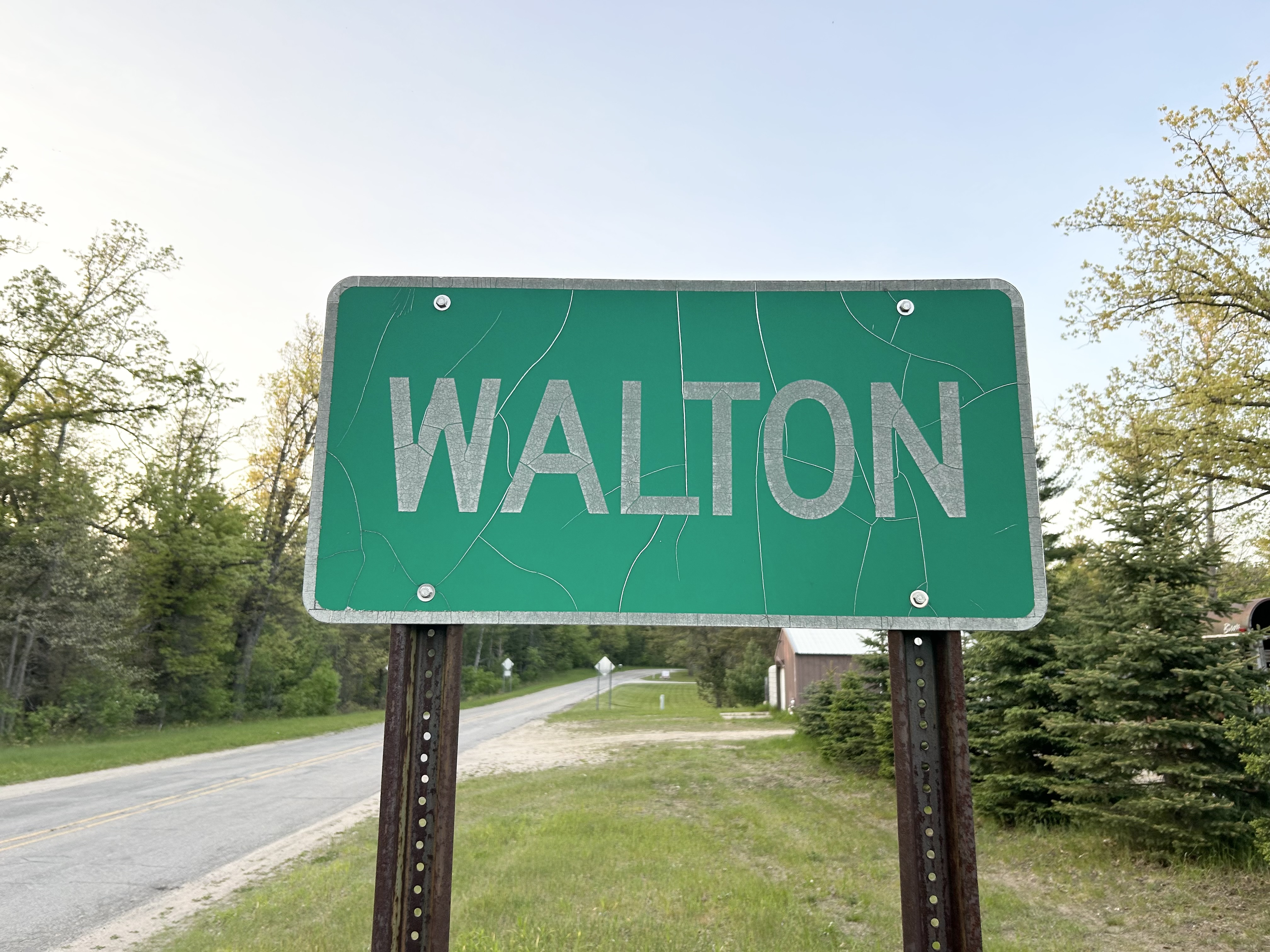
- Sign along Union Street

- Location within Michigan Location within the United States
- Coordinates: 44°31′15″N 85°23′58″W
- Country: United States
- State: Michigan
- County: Grand Traverse
- Township: Fife Lake
- Settled: 1872
- Elevation: 1,027 ft (313 m)
- Time zone: UTC-5 (Eastern (EST))
  - Summer (DST): UTC-4 (EDT)
- ZIP code(s): 49633 (Fife Lake)
- Area code: 231
- GNIS feature ID: 1615746

Walton, often referred to as Walton Junction, is an unincorporated community in the northern Lower Peninsula of the U.S. state of Michigan. The community is located within Fife Lake Township, Grand Traverse County, and lies immediately north of the Wexford County line.

== History ==
The railroad junction at Walton was established in 1872 with the completion of an extension of the Grand Rapids & Indiana Railroad north from Clam Lake (now Cadillac). The extension include a wye junction, with one branch extending northeast to Fife Lake (eventually to Petoskey), and the other extending northwest to Traverse City. While the settlement was originally called Walton Junction, a post office by the name of Walton opened on February 14, 1873. It is unclear when this post office closed. Early on, the town gained a reputation due to its lack of law enforcement and for being a rowdy and dangerous locale.

The community grew as northerly rail traffic to Traverse City and Petoskey increased throughout the 1880s and 1890s. In 1890, the local publisher, DeWitt Clinton Leach, built a dam on a creek southwest of Walton, and established a cranberry bog. The bog was abandoned by the early 1920s.

In 1909, an extension of the Manistee and North-Eastern Railroad (M&NE) opened through the community. This line, which eventually connected Mesick to Grayling, was obliterated in 1925.

In 1940, US Highway 131, which had originally run through the community, was shifted onto a newly constructed alignment east of town. Today, all that remains of Walton are a handful of residences and open plats. The original railroad junction is still used and operated by the Great Lakes Central Railroad.

== Geography ==
Walton is located in the northern Lower Peninsula of Michigan. The community lies immediately north of the Grand Traverse–Wexford county line. The community is roughly equidistant between Cadillac and Traverse City, being about 17 miles (27 km) north of Cadillac, and about 17 miles (27 km) southeast of Traverse City.

=== Major highways ===
- US 131 is a major north–south thoroughfare running immediately east of the community.
- M-113 is a primarily east–west route serving as a connector between US 131 and the Traverse City area.

== See also ==
- List of cities, villages, and townships in Michigan
- List of ghost towns in Michigan
