= Pugsley Correctional Facility =

Former prison in Michigan, United States

Coordinates: 44°32′35″N 85°25′38″W

Pugsley Correctional Facility (MPF)
- Exterior of the Pugsley Correctional Facility grounds in 2021
- Interactive map of Pugsley Correctional Facility (MPF)
- Location: Fife Lake Township, Grand Traverse County, near Kingsley, Michigan
- Status: Closed
- Security class: Minimum (Level I)
- Capacity: 1,342 male prisoners
- Opened: 1956
- Closed: 2016
- Managed by: Michigan Department of Corrections
- Director: Daniel Heyns

Pugsley Correctional Facility (MPF) was a Michigan minimum security prison operated by the Michigan Department of Corrections Correctional Facilities Administration (CFA), located between Kingsley, Michigan and Fife Lake 25 miles (40 km) southeast of Traverse City in Grand Traverse County.

Pugsley Correctional Facility sits on 180 acres (0.73 km^{2}); within that area, 23 acres (93,000 m^{2}) are enclosed by two 15.5-foot-high (4.7 m) fences to create a secure perimeter that houses 1,342 adult male prisoners. The facility has minimum security prisoner public works and gate pass assignments.

A security vehicle patrols the property operated by an armed Corrections Officer twenty-four hours per day.

In May 2016, Michigan Department of Corrections announced Pugsley would close in September of the same year as a result of declining prison population within the state.

== History ==
Pugsley Correctional Facility was named after Earl C. Pugsley, (1885–1976) of Hart, Michigan in Oceana County. He was a Republican; an Attorney; a Circuit Court Judge in the Michigan's 27th Circuit, from 1930 to 1959; and candidate for Justice of State of Michigan Supreme Court], in 1942.

Pugsley Correctional Facility was originally opened as "Camp Pugsley" a prison camp in 1956 as a part of the Corrections Conservation Prison Camp Program and housed [minimum security adult male prisoners. The purpose of the Corrections Conservation Prison Camp Program was two-fold. Various conservation projects under the direction of the Conservation Department (now the Michigan Department of Natural Resources or DNR) needed to be staffed and prisoners provided an inexpensive and reliable source of labor.

On October 1, 1997, Camp Pugsley was placed under the jurisdiction of the Oaks Correctional Facility located in Eastlake, Michigan. The Corrections Conservation Prison Camp Program, which had its headquarters in Grass Lake, Michigan, was officially disbanded.

Camp Pugsley was expanded with the construction of an administration building (containing administrative offices for the prison; a secure control center; weapons arsenal; visiting room; and Health Care Unit); six prisoner housing units, with 24 open-bay living cubicles per unit to accommodate 144 prisoners; prisoner programs building (containing prisoner classification, psychological services, general library, and law library; General Education Development, Business Education & Building Trades classrooms; and a prisoner barber shop), and food service building. The original camp building was converted to house 150 [prisoners in an open-bay barracks-style housing unit. The camp was converted to a Secure Level I prison and opened in January 2001 with a population of 1,014 prisoners administered by Warden Ray Wolfe.

In the summer of 2005, the six new housing units added one additional prisoner per living-cubicle increasing each of these housing unit's prisoner population to 168 prisoners, increasing the total population of the prison to 1,158 prisoners. In the summer of 2009, the six new housing units added one additional prisoner per living-cubicle increasing each of these housing unit's prisoner population to 192 prisoners, increasing the total population of the prison to 1,302 prisoners. In the fall of 2009, the original camp building added 40 additional prisoners, increasing the total population of the prison to 1,342 prisoners.

On May 31, 2016, Michigan Department of Corrections announced intentions to close Pugsley during the following fiscal year. They cited the facility's age, limited capacity, and a reduction in state prison population. Pugsley's budget for 2017 was cut accordingly. The prison closed on September 24, 2016. The property is today owned by the Grand Traverse Band of Ottawa and Chippewa Indians.

=== Michigan Prisoner ReEntry Initiative (MPRI) ===
In 2005, the prison became one of the original eight Pilot Sites and currently a Residential ReEntry In-Reach Facility for the Michigan Prisoner ReEntry Initiative or (MPRI) model.

== Prisoner programs and services ==
Pugsley Correctional Facility provides the following prisoner programs: General Education Development; Business Education and Building Trades classes; a pre-release program; substance abuse treatment]; Alcoholics Anonymous & Narcotics Anonymous; Assaultive and Sex Offender Therapy; Thinking for A Change; Cage Your Rage; parenting classes; and has a law library and legal writers program. Along, with various MPRI in-reach programs.

=== Recreation ===
Recreation for the prisoners includes a gymnasium, softball field, indoor and outdoor basketball court, weight pavilion, music program, hobbycraft program; walking/running track, and exercise stations.

=== Prisoner Benefit Fund ===
Equipment for these leisure-time activities are provided by the Prisoner Benefit Fund which was funded directly from the prisoner store and other prisoner fundraising functions.

=== Religious services ===
A variety of religious services is provided to the prisoner population overseen by the Prison Chaplain and aided by approved religious volunteer groups from the local community.

=== Health care services ===
The prison has a Health Care Unit that provided prisoners access to a physician, physician assistant, nursing (24 hours per day), dental and psychological services.

== See also ==
- List of Michigan state prisons
