= County Road I-39–Rapid River Bridge =

- U.S. National Register of Historic Places
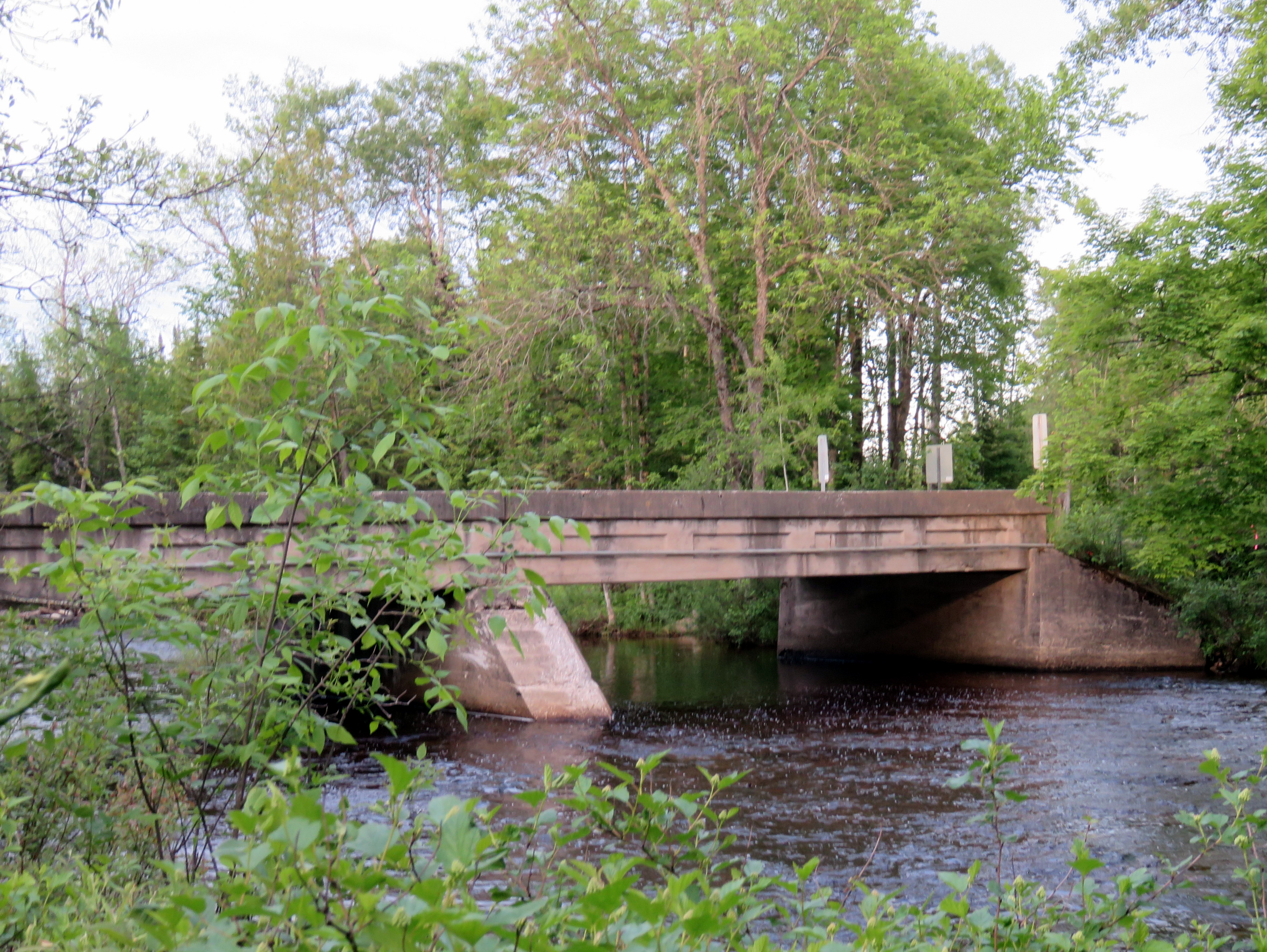

- Location within Michigan Location within the United States
- Interactive map
- Location: Co. Rd. I-39 over Rapid River, Masonville Township, Michigan
- Coordinates: 46°1′22″N 86°58′44″W
- Area: less than 1 acre (0.40 ha)
- Built: 1916
- Built by: Delta Contracting Co.
- Architect: Michigan State Highway Department
- Architectural style: Through girder bridge
- MPS: Highway Bridges of Michigan MPS
- NRHP reference No.: 99001511
- Added to NRHP: December 9, 1999

The County Road I-39–Rapid River Bridge is a bridge located on County Road I-39 (Co. Rd. I-39) over the Rapid River in Masonville Township, Michigan. It was listed on the National Register of Historic Places in 1999.

== Description ==
The bridge carrying Co. Rd. I-39 over the Rapid River is a multi-span through girder bridge constructed of concrete. The bridge is 17 feet (5.2 m) wide and 70 feet (21 m) long in total, with two main spans of 33.8 feet (10.3 m) in length.

== History ==
The Co. Rd. I-39 – Rapid River Bridge was built in 1916 by Delta Contracting Company of Escanaba, Michigan. It was the 64th trunkline bridge built in Michigan, and once carried US 41 across the Rapid River. When US 41 was rerouted, the bridge continued to serve as a county road. The bridge is one of the few multi-span through girder bridge constructed of concrete still extant in Michigan, and is the oldest example of a concrete girder bridge designed for the state trunkline system. The bridge was added to the NRHP on December 9, 1999.

== See also ==
- List of bridges on the National Register of Historic Places in Michigan
- National Register of Historic Places listings in Delta County, Michigan
