= Noquet =

Native American tribe of Michigan

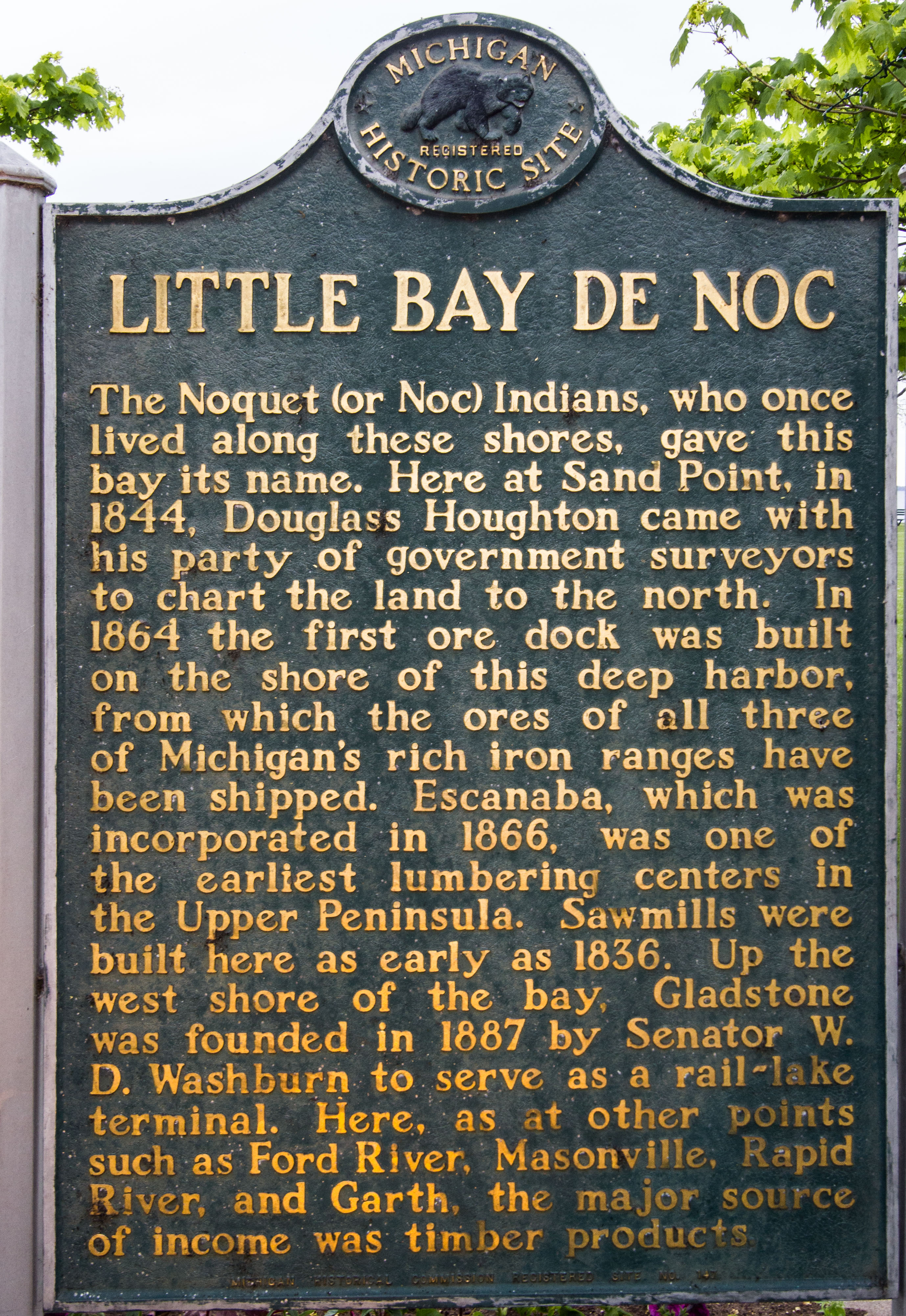
- A Michigan Historical Marker mentioning the Noquet at Little Bay de Noc

Total population
- No longer exists as a distinct tribe

Regions with significant populations
- United States (Upper Peninsula of Michigan)

Languages
- Noquet (extinct)

Religion
- Indigenous religion

Related ethnic groups
- Menominee, Ojibwe, Odawa, Potawatomi

The Noquet (/noʊˈkeɪ/ no-KAY; also spelled Nocquet, Noque, or Noc among others) (Note: There exists many spellings across various articles and literature, that in addition to the previously mentioned include Nouquet, Noquest, Noquett, Noquia, Nouket, Nokay, Noke, No-ke, No-ka, and Noká.) were a tribe of Native Americans who lived in the Upper Peninsula of Michigan. They spoke their own language in the Algonquian family, and are attested to have been most closely related to, and subsequently absorbed by, the Menominee people.

Whilst never sustaining a large population, the Noquet were once among the foremost nations in the Upper Peninsula, and made contact with many of the first Europeans to set foot in what are now the territories of Michigan and Wisconsin. Their name lives on in various places they inhabited throughout the peninsula, including Big Bay de Noc, Little Bay de Noc, and Bay de Noc Township (the Rapid River and Dead River were formerly named the Noquet and Noquemanon Rivers, respectively); in addition to Lake Noquebay in northern Wisconsin. The tribe's name is a French phonetic transcription of their endonym, derived from a Proto-Algonquian phrase meaning 'bear claw' or 'bear foot'.

A cumulation of multiple factors, primarily assimilation into the Menominee and other neighboring tribes, resulted in the extinction of the Noquet as a distinct political entity by the early 19th century, with no Native Americans today who individually or collectively identify as Noquet.

== History ==
=== Pre-colonial era ===
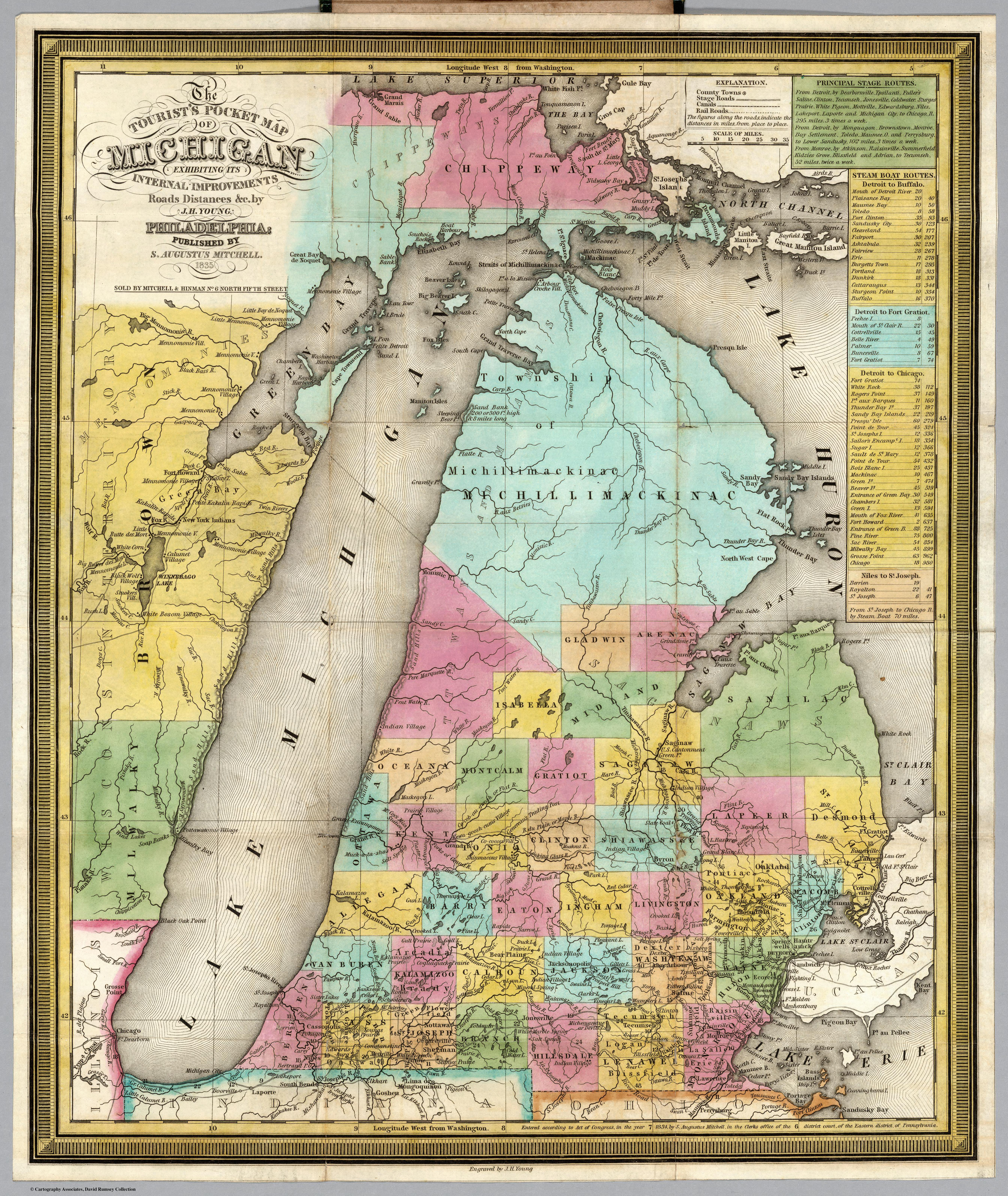
Traditional Noquet territory as seen in an 1835 Michigan Territory map, with Menominee villages scattered throughout. Labelled are the Great Bay de Noquet (Big Bay de Noc), Little Bay de Noquet (Little Bay de Noc) and the Noquet River (Rapid River).

The ancestors of the Noquet are believed to have inhabited and ruled the central Upper Peninsula for several thousands of years. Given the Noquet and Menominee were closely related allies, their most recent common ancestor was likely the Paleo-Indians that would evolve into the Algonquian group, particularly those who settled along the western banks of Lake Michigan and Lake Superior, arriving in the Upper Peninsula ostensibly as early as 8500 BCE.

As with other Great Lakes tribes, the Noquet were frequently migrating, living along Lake Superior in modern Marquette County and Alger County during the summer, harvesting wild blueberries and cultivating wild rice as part of their diet. A complex trail network spanning from Little Bay de Noc to the southern shore of Lake Superior, ending slightly west of the modern community of Christmas and opposite Grand Island, allowed the Noquet to move between their winter and summer territories. The contemporary Bay de Noc–Grand Island trail administered by the Hiawatha National Forest roughly defines the original path, running parallel to the Whitefish River before moving northeastward to Furnace Bay. The trail is a Registered Historic Site of Michigan, and a marker at its head states:

The trail that begins here was one of the most important in the Upper Peninsula. The Noquets, an Algonquian tribe, lived in this area and used the trail in their frequent travels between Lake Michigan and Lake Superior.

The city of Escanaba, which was established on Little Bay de Noc's western half, acknowledges the Noquet as having historically inhabited the mouth of the city's eponymous river. An informational kiosk in the municipal Waterfront Park similarly makes mention of the prehistoric Grand Island trail, stating:

Near [Whitefish River] is the southern end of what was once a well-worn Indian trail between Grand Island on Lake Superior and Lake Michigan's northern bays. [...] Unlike the transience of the small tribe of Indian people known as the Nokes or Noquets who visited the area and gave the bay its name, the white settlers who came decided to stay.

They also periodically took residence on the Potawatomi Islands off the coast of the Garden Peninsula in Lake Michigan's Green Bay, formerly known as the Noquet Islands. These include Summer Island, St. Martin Island, and the largest being Washington Island. However, this archipelago would be dominated by the distantly related and eponymous Potawatomi by 1650, one of the three main branches of Anishinaabe, and allies with whom the Noquet maintained friendly relations. Like the Menominee, their territory may have extended south of the Menominee River with its modern border into mainland Wisconsin, but this remains speculative.

The Spider Cave, an archaeological site with ancient pictographs on the shores of the Stonington Peninsula that divides the Little and Big Bays de Noc in Delta County, is arguably the most notable paleohistoric feature associated with the Noquet, with them arriving to this specific locale thousands of years before present. Indeed, the artifacts found at the site, including metal arrowheads, returned a date of approximately 600 CE. Of the four pictographs, all engraved on the walls of the cave with various brightly colored dyes, the most prominent one depicts a man connected to a sixteen-legged spider by a spiral umbilical cord, and is from where the cave gets its name. It is believed to represent a manifestation of the Manitou, a spiritual concept shared by all nations in the region. Throughout the centuries, the images have been damaged by spelunkers and exposure to the elements, and the area is now closed off to the public as a protected zone of Fayette Historic State Park. Other archeological sites in Delta County from the middle-to-late Woodland period that correlate to areas of former Noquet occupancy include the Winter Site and Summer Island Site, among others. These excavations have led to the discovery of pottery, tools made from copper and iron, and trade beads.

Presque Isle Park in the city of Marquette was a sacred site and historical burial ground for the Noquet, and later the Ojibwe. The Anishinaabe refer to this area as Gichi-namebini-ziibing, and several Anishinaabe chiefs, including Charlie Kawbawgam (1800–1903), are known to be buried there.

=== Contact with Europeans ===
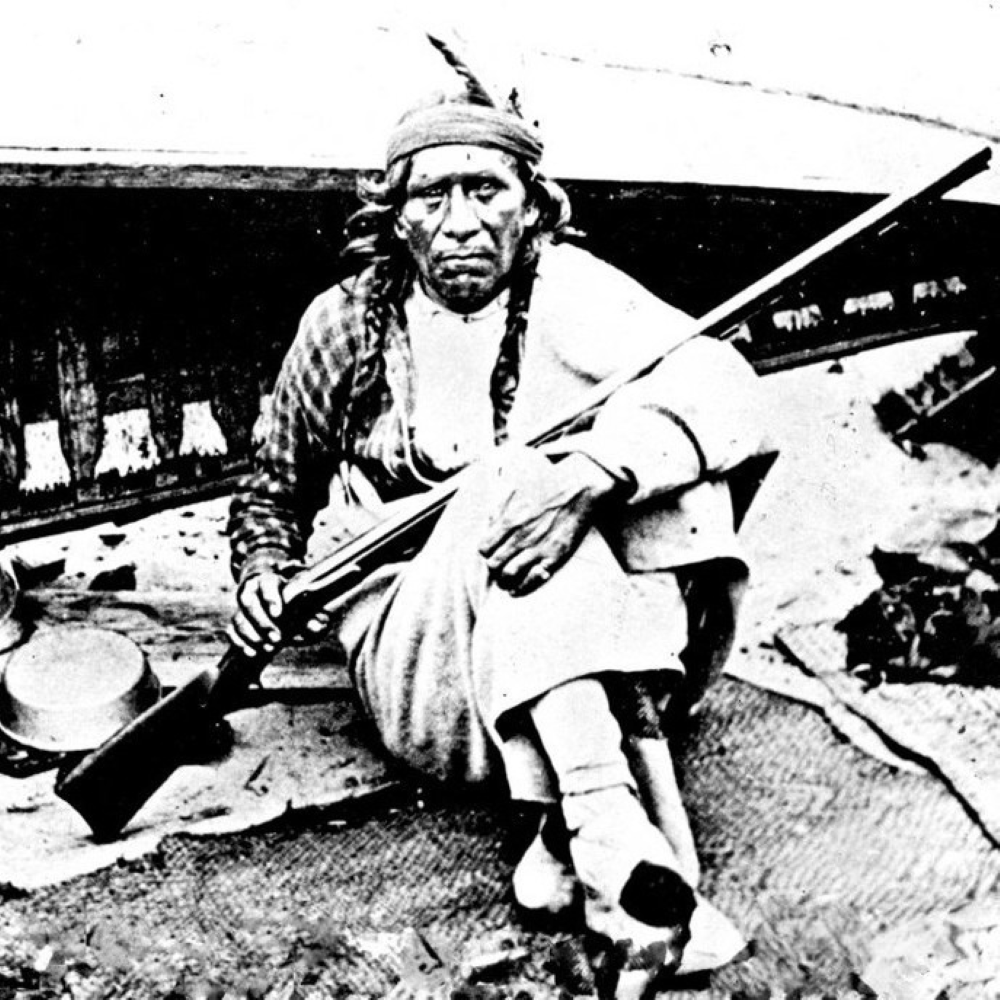
Chief Marji Gesick (pictured here, circa mid-1800s) was descended from the Noquet.

In the early 1630s, famed explorer Jean Nicolet recounted interactions with a group of Algonquians now assumed to be the Noquet north of the Menominee River. Later Jesuit missionaries of the time would attest to the presence of Noquet villages at the head of what is now called Little Bay de Noc, near the modern settlement of Rapid River in Delta County. By 1659, the tribe would be attached to the mission of St. Michael, alongside the Menominee and Potawatomi. Decades later, fellow European-born explorer Jacques Marquette mentioned the Noquet in his journals as a small clan of Algonquian Indians numbering about 150. 17th-century French Jesuit missionary and founder of Sault Ste. Marie alongside Father Marquette, Claude Dablon, described the Noquet as the original inhabitants of the southern shore of Lake Superior, whose presence predated the arrival of prominent Anishinaabe tribes in their historic territory by potentially hundreds or thousands of years.

In September 1698, another French Jesuit, Jean-François Buisson de Saint-Cosme, documented the Noquet as one of the primary tribes inhabiting the shores of the Baie des Puants (Green Bay), with the Menominee, Meskwaki, Sauk, and Potawatomi. He also stated that upon reaching Green Bay, "one passes on the right hand another small bay called that of the Noquest", referring to what would eventually be called Little Bay de Noc.

While navigating the Great Lakes in 1721, Pierre Francois Xavier de Charlevoix noted that only a few Noquet families remained. He additionally wrote in 1761, "I have been assured that [the Menominee] had the same original and nearly the same languages with the Noquet and the Indians at the Falls." This account gave further validity to the group's presumed ties with the Menominee. 19th-century Wisconsin-based trader Augustin Grignon (1780-1860), grandson of the famous French–Odawa (Métis) military officer Charles Michel de Langlade, insisted that the Noquet had become part of Menominee society by his time.

One of the only documented descendants of the Noquet was an Ojibwe chief named Marji Gesick (also spelled Matji-gigig, Mah-je-ge-zhik or Man-je-ki-jik), who in 1845 helped lead white immigrant prospectors to plentiful iron deposits along the shores of Lake Superior and Teal Lake. The settlements built by these men beside Teal Lake would soon become the cities of Negaunee and Ishpeming. Gesick's name has since been lent to an annual cycling marathon in Marquette County — the Marji Gesick Mountain Bike Race. He would die sometime between 1857 and 1862, with his only child, a daughter, later marrying Chief Charlie Kawbawgam.

== Legacy ==
Little else is known about the Noquet today, and it is to be assumed that they were gradually integrated into the Menominee and other neighboring Algonquian nations throughout the 18th and 19th centuries, as a consequence of their territories overlapping, their deep linguistic and cultural ties, inter-tribal marriages, and a dwindling population due to disease.

In addition to the various toponymy referencing the Noquet throughout the Upper Peninsula, their name has been lent to the Noquet Lodge, a Detroit chapter of the Boy Scouts of America that lasted from 2011 to 2020, with their totem symbol being a bear's paw. There was also the Bay de Noquet Lumber Company, founded in Oconto, Wisconsin and relocated to Nahma Township in 1881. For much of the early 20th century, they were one of Michigan's largest producers of lumber, ultimately ceasing operations in 1951. The mill's waste burner was listed on the U.S. National Register of Historic Places until it collapsed in 2019. The former name of the Dead River, Noquemanon, has survived throughout Marquette County, used in the contemporary Noquemanon Trail Network and annual Noquemanon Ski Marathon.

== See also ==
- History of Michigan
- Algonquian peoples
