= Long Lake (Kalkaska County, Michigan) =

Lake in the state of Michigan, United States

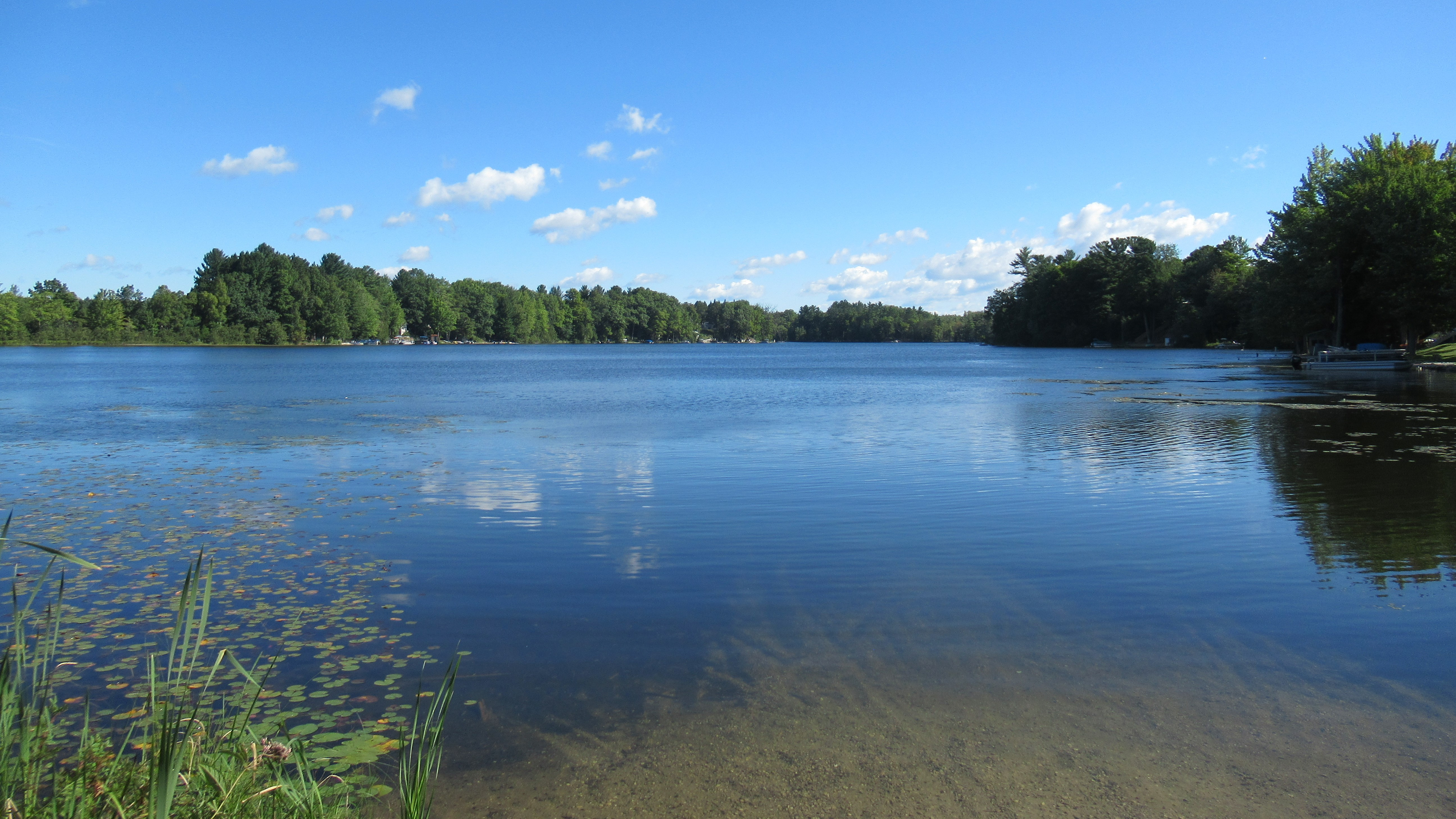
- View from the boating access site

- Location within the state of Michigan
- Location: Kalkaska County, Michigan
- Coordinates: 44°34′22″N 85°17′52″W
- Type: Fresh water
- Basin countries: United States
- Surface area: 78 acres (31.6 ha)
- Max. depth: 20 feet (6.1 m)
- Surface elevation: 1,076 feet (328 m)
- Islands: none
- Settlements: Springfield Township

Long Lake is a fresh water lake located in southwest Kalkaska County in the U.S. state of Michigan. The lake encompasses 78 acres (31.6 ha). It is located entirely within Springfield Township about five miles (8.0 km) east of U.S. Highway 131 and Fife Lake.

The lake has a maximum depth of 20 feet (6.1 m) near the northern end. The lake is surrounded mostly by private residences but does have one public access boat launch along Ingersoll Road at the southern end of the lake at 44°34′06.2″N 85°18′13.3″W. The boat launch has minimal roadside parking with a loose gravel surface that is only suitable for small to medium watercraft.
