= M113 (disambiguation) =

M113 or M-113 may refer to:

- M113 Armored Personnel Carrier
  - Variants of the M113 armored personnel carrier
- Mercedes-Benz M113 engine
- M-113 (Michigan highway), a state highway in Michigan
- a fictional planet where the M-113 Creature, an alien creature appearing in "The Man Trap" episode of Star Trek: The Original Series, lives
