= M-113 (Michigan highway) =

State highway in Grand Traverse County, Michigan, United States

M-113
- M-113 highlighted in red

Route information
- Maintained by MDOT
- Length: 16.573 mi (26.672 km)
- Existed: November 1927–present

Major junctions
- West end: M-37 near Kingsley
- M-186 near Fife Lake
- East end: US 131 near Walton

Location
- Country: United States
- State: Michigan
- Counties: Grand Traverse

Highway system
- Michigan State Trunkline Highway System; Interstate; US; State; Byways
← M-112	→ M-114

M-113 is a state trunkline highway in the US state of Michigan that runs in southern Grand Traverse County, connecting M-37 in Mayfield Township to US Highway 131 (US 131) near Walton Junction. Running through rural farmland and dense woodland, M-113 provides access to the village of Kingsley, as well as offering a route from US 131 to Traverse City. First designated in November 1927, the highway was extended in 1940 by adding the southernmost section near Walton Junction, which was originally part of US 131.

== Route description ==
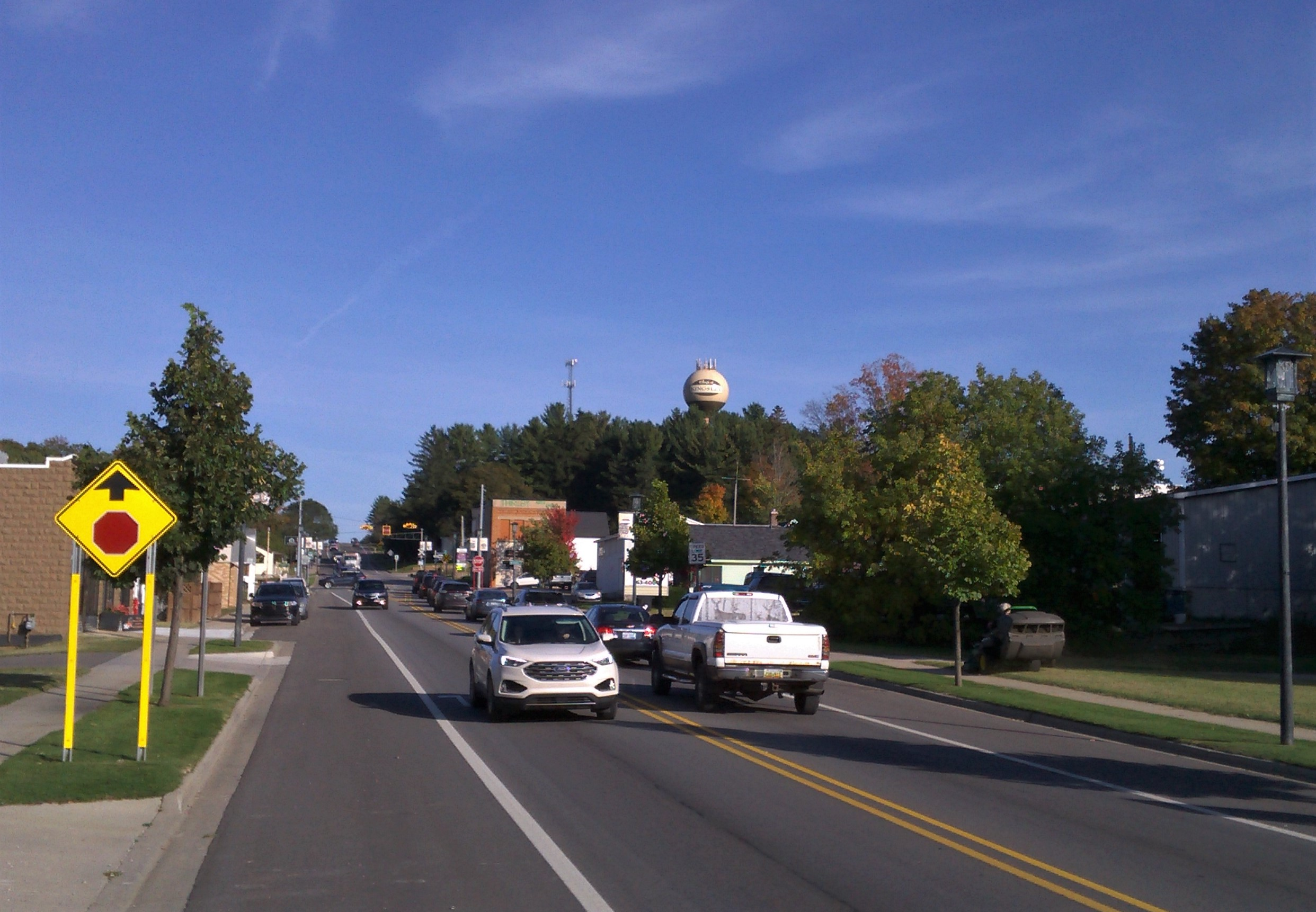
M-113 in downtown Kingsley

M-113 starts west of Hannah at an intersection with M-37 south of Traverse City. The highway runs eastward through farm fields. In the community of Hannah, the highway passes the church and the cemetery before exiting. On the other side of the town, M-113 continues through more fields to Kingsley. The trunkline follows Main Street through the business district in the village. On the east side of town, M-113 runs through fields mixed with scattered groves of trees. The landscape transitions over to woodland just before a 90-degree turn south near Fife Lake. About a mile (1.6 km) south of the turn, M-113 intersects M-186 at the latter's western terminus. M-113 continues due south past Camp Pugsley Correctional Facility and turns southeasterly. The highway crosses a line of the Great Lakes Central Railroad, and then it terminates at US 131 north of the Manistee River and the Grand Traverse–Wexford county line.

M-113 is maintained by the Michigan Department of Transportation (MDOT) like other state highways in Michigan. As a part of these maintenance responsibilities, the department tracks the volume of traffic that uses the roadways under its jurisdiction. These volumes are expressed using a metric called annual average daily traffic, which is a statistical calculation of the average daily number of vehicles on a segment of roadway. MDOT's surveys in 2009 showed that the highest traffic levels along M-113 were the 7,519 vehicles daily in the village of Kingsley; the lowest count was 4,161 vehicles per day south of the M-186 intersection. No section of M-113 has been listed on the National Highway System, a network of roads important to the country's economy, defense, and mobility.

== History ==
M-113 was first designated in November 1927 from M-42 (now M-37) west of Kingsley to a three-way junction with US 131 and M-131 near Fife Lake; at this time, US 131 ended west of Fife Lake and M-131 continued east to Fife Lake and north to Petoskey. M-42 was replaced by M-37 in 1940, and US 131 was relocated around the same time north from Walton Junction along a new alignment to Fife Lake. From Fife Lake northward, US 131 replaced M-131. The portion of M-131 running west of Fife Lake became M-186 and the remaining piece of US 131 between M-113 and Walton Junction was added to M-113. The routing has remained unchanged since.

== Major intersections ==
The entire highway is in Grand Traverse County.

Location	mi	km	Destinations	Notes
Mayfield Township	0.000	0.000	M-37 – Traverse City, Baldwin	
Fife Lake Township	12.385	19.932	M-186 east – Fife Lake	Former eastern terminus of M-113
Walton Junction	16.573	26.672	US 131 – Kalkaska, Petoskey, Cadillac	
1.000 mi = 1.609 km; 1.000 km = 0.621 mi
