= Bloomfield Township =

Bloomfield Township may refer to:

- Bloomfield Township, LaGrange County, Indiana
- Bloomfield Township, Clinton County, Iowa
- Bloomfield Township, Polk County, Iowa
- Bloomfield Township, Winneshiek County, Iowa
- Bloomfield Township, Mitchell County, Kansas, in Mitchell County, Kansas
- Bloomfield Township, Sheridan County, Kansas
- Bloomfield Township, Huron County, Michigan
- Bloomfield Township, Missaukee County, Michigan
- Bloomfield Township, Oakland County, Michigan
- Bloomfield Township, Fillmore County, Minnesota
- Bloomfield Township, New Jersey
- Bloomfield Township, Traill County, North Dakota, in Traill County, North Dakota
- Bloomfield Township, Jackson County, Ohio
- Bloomfield Township, Logan County, Ohio
- Bloomfield Township, Trumbull County, Ohio
- Bloomfield Township, Bedford County, Pennsylvania
- Bloomfield Township, Crawford County, Pennsylvania

== See also ==
- Blumfield Township, Saginaw County, Michigan
