= Days River =

Coordinates: 45°53′37″N 86°59′5″W

The Days River is a 30.1-mile-long (48.4 km) river on the Upper Peninsula of the U.S. state of Michigan.

It is a narrow, rocky, and scenic river that supports brook, steelhead and rainbow trout, smelt, and white and longnose suckers in the spring. The river runs south to its mouth on Little Bay De Noc on Lake Michigan at , near Masonville Township. There is a low-head dam by Gladstone Golf Course installed in 1978 to prevent upstream migration of invasive sea lamprey.

Days River was named for John Day, a trapper and pioneer settler.
