= Rapid River, Michigan =

- Census-designated place (CDP) & unincorporated community
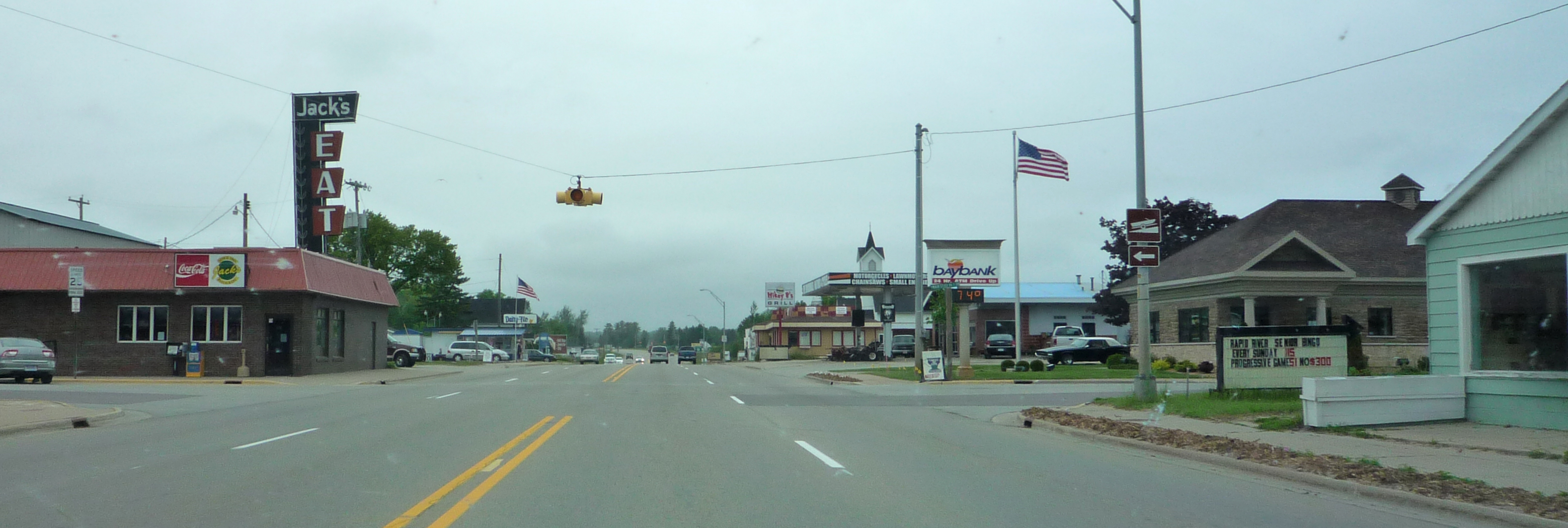
- Rapid River along US 2

- Location within the state of Michigan Rapid River (the United States)
- Coordinates: 45°55′35″N 86°58′01″W
- Country: United States
- State: Michigan
- County: Delta
- Township: Masonville

Area
  - Total: 1.26 sq mi (3.27 km^{2})
  - Land: 1.26 sq mi (3.27 km^{2})
  - Water: 0 sq mi (0.00 km^{2})
- Elevation: 594 ft (181 m)

Population (2020)
  - Total: 335
  - Density: 265.4/sq mi (102.49/km^{2})
- Time zone: UTC-5 (Eastern (EST))
  - Summer (DST): UTC-4 (EDT)
- ZIP code(s): 49878
- Area code: 906
- GNIS feature ID: 1621342

Rapid River is an unincorporated community in Masonville Township, Delta County in the U.S. state of Michigan. As of the 2020 census, Rapid River had a population of 335.

It is situated on the northern end of the Little Bay de Noc between the mouths of the Tacoosh and Rapid rivers with the mouth of the Whitefish River just to the east. U.S. Highway 2 (US 2) passes through Rapid River and joins with US 41 just west of town; the two then run concurrently from Rapid River south to Escanaba. The Rapid River ZIP code is 49878 and also serves areas in the nearby townships in Delta County of Baldwin, Bay de Noc, Brampton, Ensign, Garden, Maple Ridge, Masonville, and Nahma. It also serves a small area in Mathias Township in Alger County

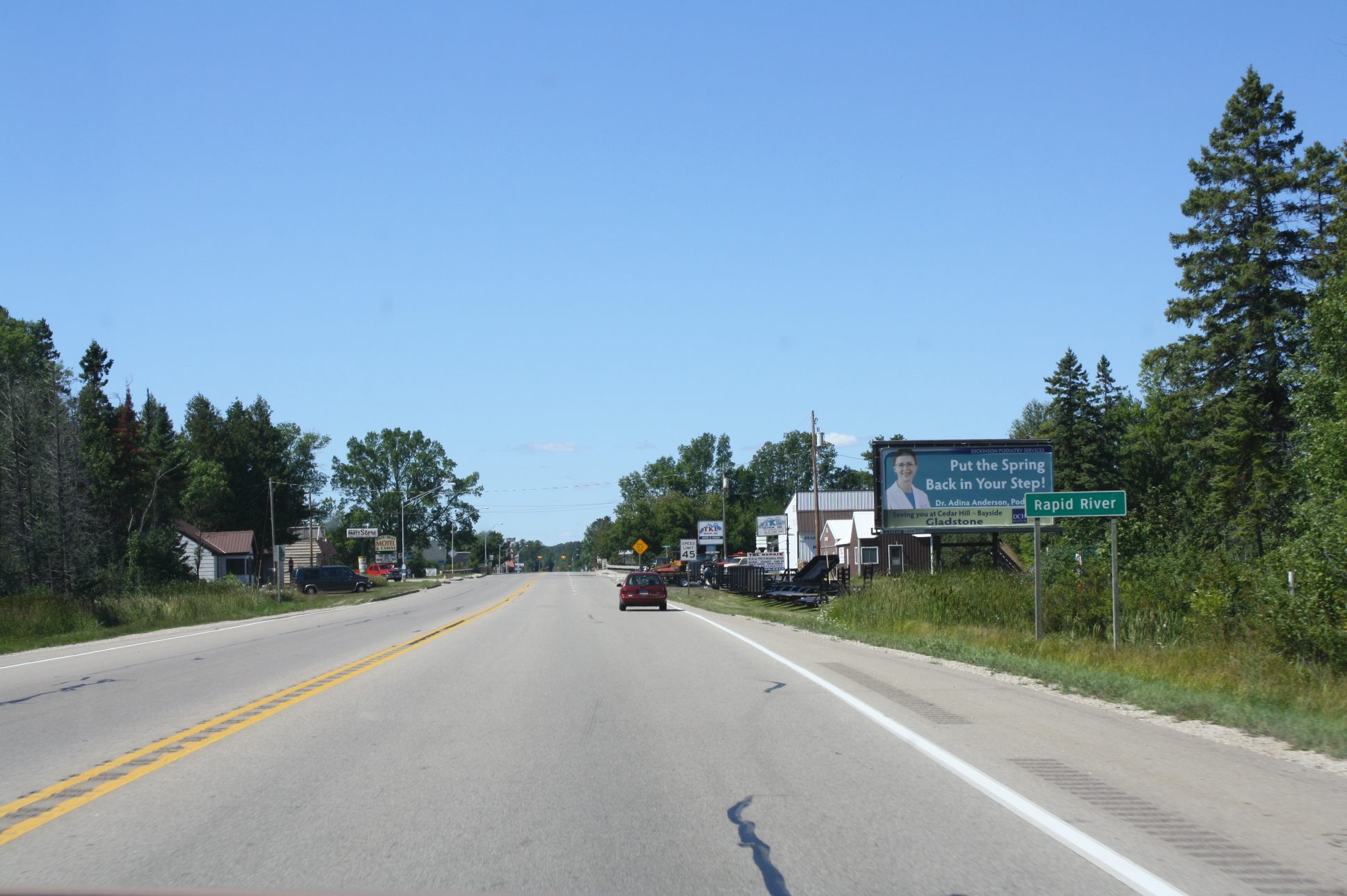
Sign for Rapid River, Michigan

The community was first named Rapid Siding as a stop on the Minneapolis, St. Paul and Sault Ste. Marie Railroad, and subsequently renamed for the nearby river. The name was recorded as Rapid River when the community was platted in 1887. The community never incorporated as a village.

Rapid River has a rich history that spans centuries which included settlements of the indigenous Noquet and Ojibwe peoples, and was also once a thriving logging town with businesses lining Main Street (then called Broadway Street). The first sawmill in the Upper Peninsula of Michigan was built along the Rapid River in 1835. The Ojibwe people called the river known as "Rapid River" by the name Waishka. Today a few of the original buildings remain from over 130 years ago. One of the buildings, The Swallow Inn, was built in the 1890s which used to be a boarding house and has been a restaurant and bar for over a hundred years. Another is The Rapid River Pub, while having many different names over the years, this building also was built in the 1890s and was a hotel, restaurant, and bar and continues to be a restaurant and bar.

One scene from the 2001 film Escanaba in da Moonlight was shot in the Swallow Inn, a bar in Rapid River.

Public schools in Rapid River are administered by the Rapid River Schools, the area's school district. The high school's athletic teams are known as the "Rockets". The school's 8-man varsity football team won Division 2 of the Michigan State Championship in 2018.

Fire coverage is provided by the Masonville Township Volunteer Fire Department and Ensign Township Volunteer Fire Department. Emergency Medical Services are provided by the Masonville Township Volunteer EMS service which provide non-transport Basic Life Support services.

Indian Trails provides daily intercity bus service between St. Ignace and Ironwood, Michigan.

== Demographics ==
Historical population
Census	Pop.	Note	%±
2020	335		—
U.S. Decennial Census

== Climate ==
Climate data for Rapid River, Michigan, 1991–2020 normals
Month	Jan	Feb	Mar	Apr	May	Jun	Jul	Aug	Sep	Oct	Nov	Dec	Year
Mean daily maximum °F (°C)	24.8 (−4.0)	27.9 (−2.3)	38.0 (3.3)	50.2 (10.1)	63.3 (17.4)	72.6 (22.6)	76.7 (24.8)	75.8 (24.3)	68.3 (20.2)	55.0 (12.8)	41.3 (5.2)	30.3 (−0.9)	52.0 (11.1)
Daily mean °F (°C)	15.8 (−9.0)	17.1 (−8.3)	26.6 (−3.0)	39.0 (3.9)	51.9 (11.1)	61.5 (16.4)	66.5 (19.2)	65.4 (18.6)	58.1 (14.5)	45.5 (7.5)	34.0 (1.1)	23.1 (−4.9)	42.0 (5.6)
Mean daily minimum °F (°C)	6.8 (−14.0)	6.2 (−14.3)	15.2 (−9.3)	27.8 (−2.3)	40.5 (4.7)	50.4 (10.2)	56.3 (13.5)	54.9 (12.7)	47.8 (8.8)	35.9 (2.2)	26.6 (−3.0)	15.9 (−8.9)	32.0 (0.0)
Average precipitation inches (mm)	1.60 (41)	1.28 (33)	1.87 (47)	2.57 (65)	3.49 (89)	2.48 (63)	3.64 (92)	2.89 (73)	3.43 (87)	3.48 (88)	2.79 (71)	1.77 (45)	31.29 (794)
Source: NOAA
