= Masonville Township, Michigan =

- Civil township
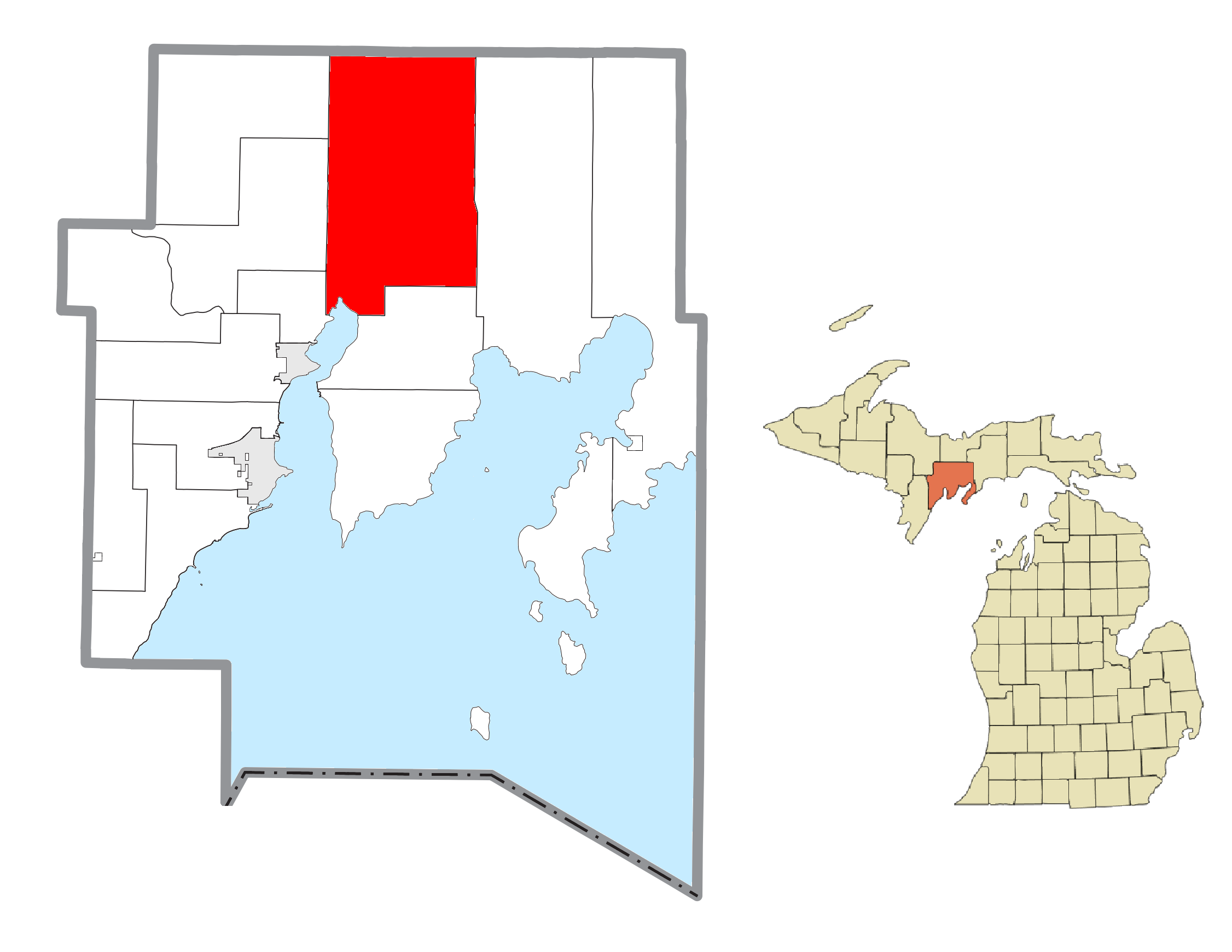
- Location within Delta County

- Location within the state of Michigan Masonville Township (the United States)
- Coordinates: 45°58′48″N 86°55′00″W
- Country: United States
- State: Michigan
- County: Delta

Government
  - Supervisor: Wendy Holzenkamp

Area
  - Total: 170.4 sq mi (441.4 km^{2})
  - Land: 167.7 sq mi (434.3 km^{2})
  - Water: 2.7 sq mi (7.1 km^{2})
- Elevation: 633 ft (193 m)

Population (2020)
  - Total: 1,645
  - Density: 9.810/sq mi (3.788/km^{2})
- Time zone: UTC-5 (Eastern (EST))
  - Summer (DST): UTC-4 (EDT)
- ZIP code(s): 49878
- Area code: 906
- FIPS code: 26-52220
- GNIS feature ID: 1626707

Masonville Township is a civil township of Delta County in the U.S. state of Michigan. The population was 1,645 at the 2020 census, down from 1,734 at the 2010 census.

== Geography ==
According to the United States Census Bureau, the township has a total area of 170.4 square miles (441 km^{2}), of which 167.7 square miles (434 km^{2}) is land and 2.7 square miles (7.0 km^{2}) (1.61%) is water.

=== Climate ===
- Masonville Township, Michigan

Garth Point

Climate chart (precipitation, max. and min. temperature)
J	F	M	A	M	J	J	A	S	O	N	D
63 −7 −14	52 −8 −15	55 −1 −8	78 9 −1	63 16 4	91 19 11	113 24 15	74 23 15	118 19 13	118 10 3	104 3 −2	64 −5 −10
- █ Average max. and min. temperatures in °C
- █ Precipitation totals in mm
Imperial conversion
J	F	M	A	M	J	J	A	S	O	N	D
2.5 19 7	2 18 5	2.2 30 18	3.1 48 30	2.5 61 39	3.6 66 52	4.4 75 59	2.9 73 59	4.6 66 55	4.6 50 37	4.1 37 28	2.5 23 14
- █ Average max. and min. temperatures in °F
- █ Precipitation totals in inches

== Communities ==
- Ensign was an unincorporated community founded in 1880. It became a station on the Minneapolis, St. Paul and Sault Ste. Marie Railroad in 1888.
- Rapid River is an unincorporated community and census-designated place located on the northern end of the Little Bay de Noc between the mouths of the Tacoosh and Rapid rivers.

== Demographics ==
As of the census of 2000, there were 1,877 people, 771 households, and 548 families residing in the township. The population density was 11.2 inhabitants per square mile (4.3/km^{2}). There were 1,143 housing units at an average density of 6.8 per square mile (2.6/km^{2}). The racial makeup of the township was 94.14% White, 0.05% African American, 3.14% Native American, 0.37% Asian, 0.32% from other races, and 1.97% from two or more races. Hispanic or Latino of any race were 0.43% of the population.

There were 771 households, out of which 28.3% had children under the age of 18 living with them, 59.7% were married couples living together, 7.4% had a female householder with no husband present, and 28.8% were non-families. 25.2% of all households were made up of individuals, and 11.9% had someone living alone who was 65 years of age or older. The average household size was 2.41 and the average family size was 2.87.

In the township the population was spread out, with 22.5% under the age of 18, 7.1% from 18 to 24, 25.1% from 25 to 44, 27.9% from 45 to 64, and 17.4% who were 65 years of age or older. The median age was 42 years. For every 100 females, there were 101.4 males. For every 100 females age 18 and over, there were 97.2 males.

The median income for a household in the township was $35,887, and the median income for a family was $42,778. Males had a median income of $35,568 versus $22,656 for females. The per capita income for the township was $18,375. About 6.0% of families and 9.8% of the population were below the poverty line, including 10.4% of those under age 18 and 8.2% of those age 65 or over.
