= Springfield Township, Kalkaska County, Michigan =

Springfield Township, Michigan
- Civil township
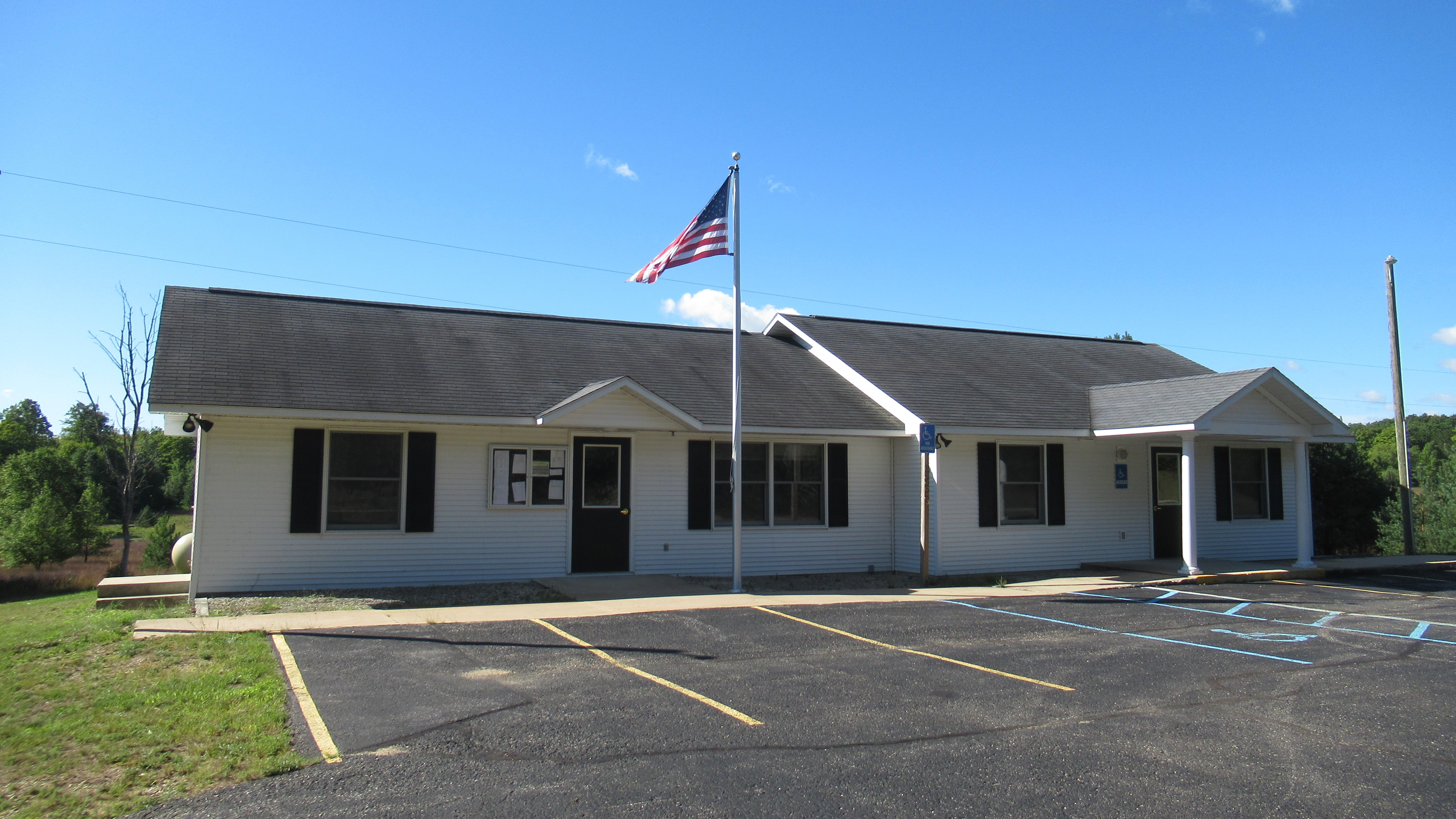
- Springfield Township Hall

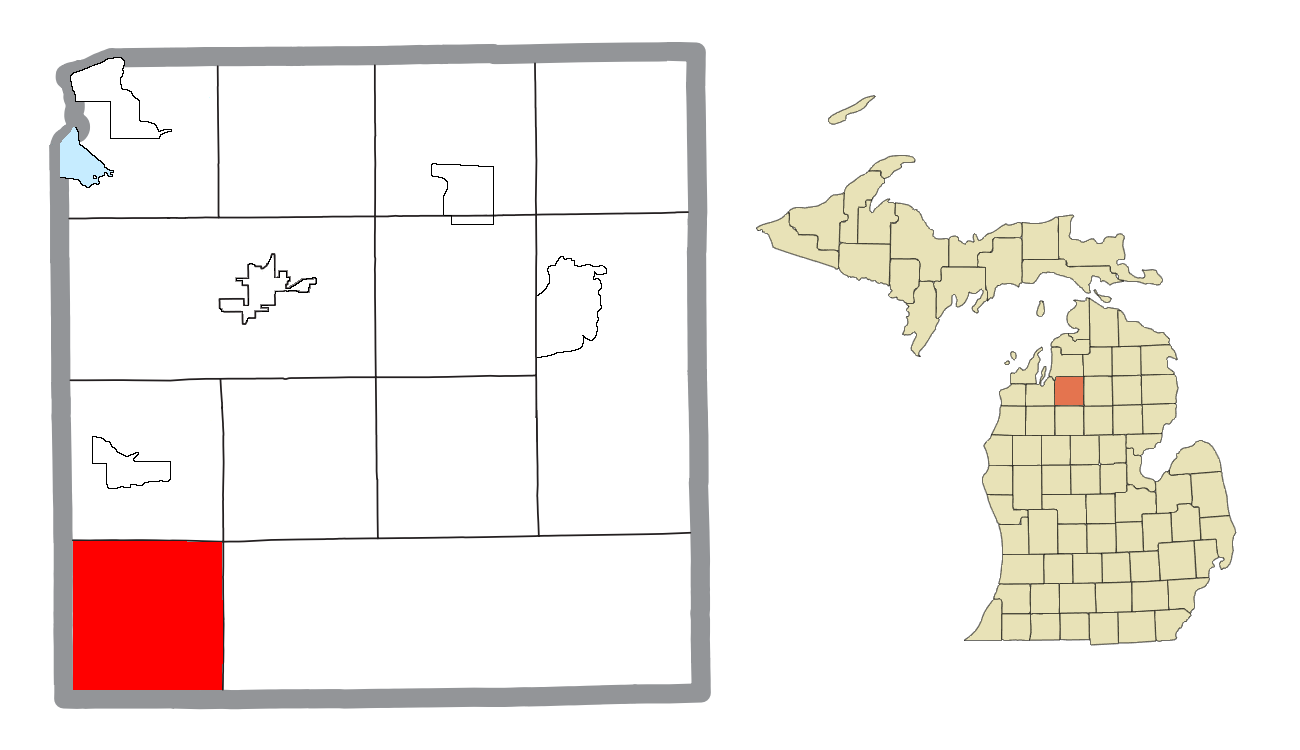
- Location within Kalkaska County

- Location within the state of Michigan Springfield Township (the United States)
- Coordinates: 44°33′00″N 85°16′25″W
- Country: United States
- State: Michigan
- County: Kalkaska

Government
  - Supervisor: Thomas Gonyer
  - Clerk: Sandra Parker

Area
  - Total: 35.58 sq mi (92.2 km^{2})
  - Land: 35.09 sq mi (90.9 km^{2})
  - Water: 0.49 sq mi (1.3 km^{2})
- Elevation: 1,047 ft (319 m)

Population (2020)
  - Total: 1,562
  - Density: 43.4/sq mi (16.8/km^{2})
- Time zone: UTC-5 (Eastern (EST))
  - Summer (DST): UTC-4 (EDT)
- ZIP code(s): 49633 (Fife Lake); 49680 (South Boardman)
- Area code: 231
- FIPS code: 26-75720
- GNIS feature ID: 1627109
- Website: https://www.springfieldtownship-kalkaskacounty.org/

Springfield Township is a civil township of Kalkaska County in the U.S. state of Michigan. The population was 1,562 at the 2020 census.

== Geography ==
According to the United States Census Bureau, the township has a total area of 35.58 square miles (92.15 km^{2}), of which 35.09 square miles (90.88 km^{2}) is land and 0.49 square miles (1.27 km^{2}) (1.38%) is water.

The Manistee River flows east to west through the south of the township. Long Lake is the biggest lake within the township.

The village of Fife Lake lies just west of Springfield Township, in Grand Traverse County. A sliver of the eponymous Fife Lake is within the western edge of the township.

=== Adjacent townships ===
- Boardman Township (north)
- Orange Township (northeast)
- Garfield Township (east)
- Pioneer Township, Missaukee County (southeast)
- Bloomfield Township, Missaukee County (south)
- Liberty Township, Wexford County (southwest)
- Fife Lake Township, Grand Traverse County (west)
- Union Township, Grand Traverse County (northwest)

=== Major highway ===
- US 131 clips the extreme northwest corner of Springfield Township, entering from the west and exiting to the north.

== Demographics ==
As of the census of 2000, there were 1,270 people, 458 households, and 348 families residing in the township. The population density was 36.1 inhabitants per square mile (13.9/km^{2}). There were 704 housing units at an average density of 20.0 units per square mile (7.7 units/km^{2}). The racial makeup of the township was 97.32% White, 0.47% African American, 0.79% Native American, 0.08% Pacific Islander, and 1.34% from two or more races. Hispanic or Latino of any race were 0.39% of the population.

There were 458 households, out of which 34.9% had children under the age of 18 living with them, 62.4% were married couples living together, 8.5% had a female householder with no husband present, and 24.0% were non-families. 18.3% of all households were made up of individuals, and 6.3% had someone living alone who was 65 years of age or older. The average household size was 2.77 and the average family size was 3.07.

In the township the population was spread out, with 28.0% under the age of 18, 8.0% from 18 to 24, 28.7% from 25 to 44, 25.6% from 45 to 64, and 9.8% who were 65 years of age or older. The median age was 36 years. For every 100 females, there were 103.2 males. For every 100 females age 18 and over, there were 98.5 males.

The median income for a household in the township was $38,667, and the median income for a family was $42,647. Males had a median income of $31,333 versus $20,855 for females. The per capita income for the township was $15,666. About 8.6% of families and 10.2% of the population were below the poverty line, including 11.8% of those under age 18 and 6.8% of those age 65 or over.
