= Fife Lake (Michigan) =

Lake in the state of Michigan, United States

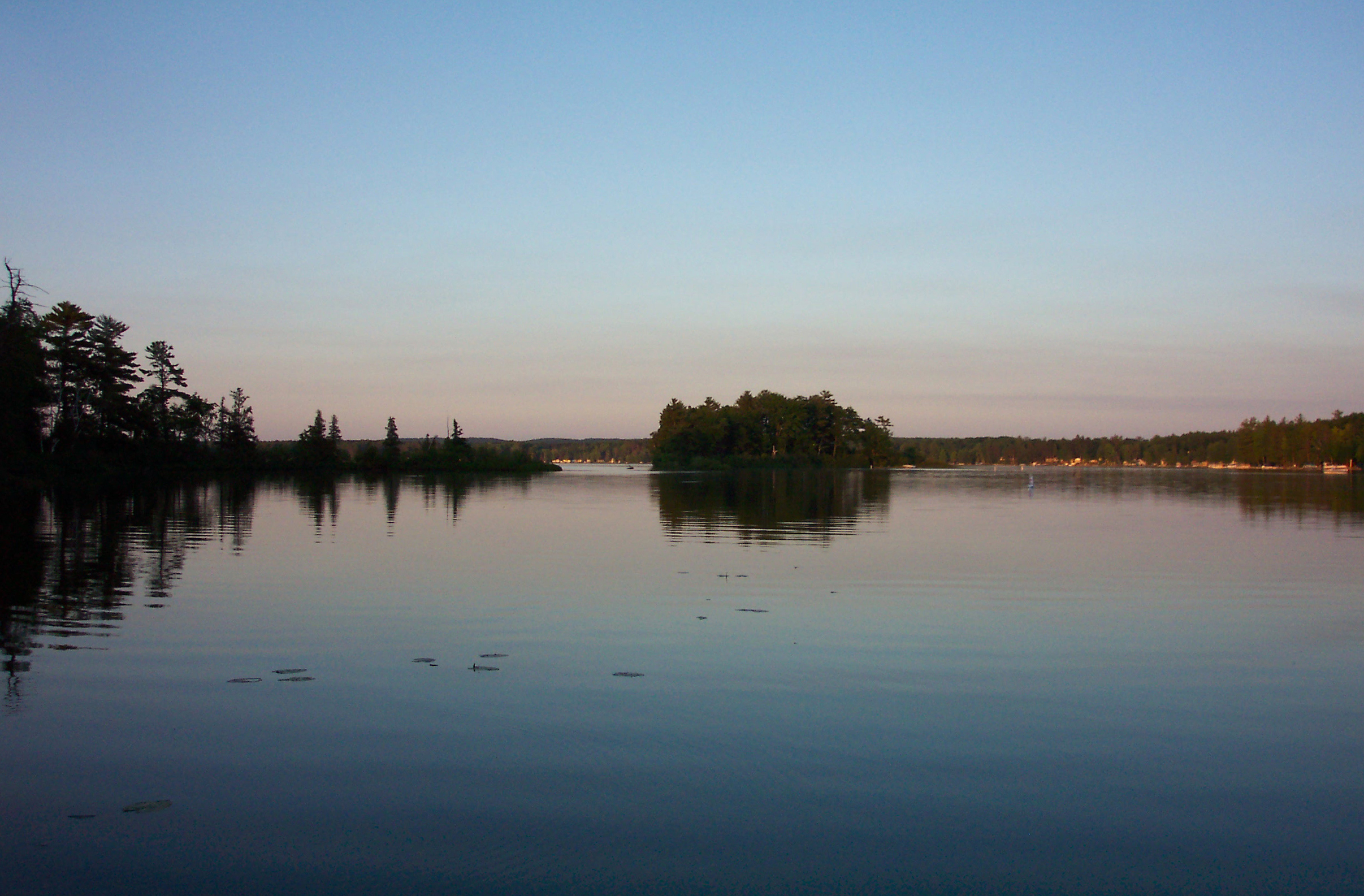
- Fife Lake at Sunset

- Location within Michigan
- Location: Fife Lake Township, Grand Traverse County and Springfield Township, Kalkaska County, Michigan, U.S.
- Coordinates: 44°34′0.66″N 85°20′38.27″W
- Type: Lake
- Primary inflows: Inlet Creek
- Primary outflows: Fife Lake Outlet (Manistee River)
- Surface area: 617 acres (2 km^{2})
- Max. depth: 55 ft (17 m)
- Surface elevation: 1,017 ft (310 m)
- Islands: Helen Island, Florence Island
- Settlements: Fife Lake

Fife Lake (/faɪf/ FYFE) is a lake in the Lower Peninsula of the U.S. state of Michigan. Located primarily in Fife Lake Township, Grand Traverse County, a small portion extends east into Springfield Township, Kalkaska County. The eponymous village of Fife Lake lies upon the lake's northern and western shores.

The lake and village are named for William H. Fife, a postmaster from Yuba, elsewhere in Grand Traverse County.

Fife Lake is part of the Manistee River watershed. Water from Fife Lake crosses south into Wexford County before encountering the Manistee River, where it flows west to Lake Michigan.

== See also ==
- List of lakes in Michigan
