= Bloomfield Township, Missaukee County, Michigan =

Bloomfield Township, Michigan
- Civil township
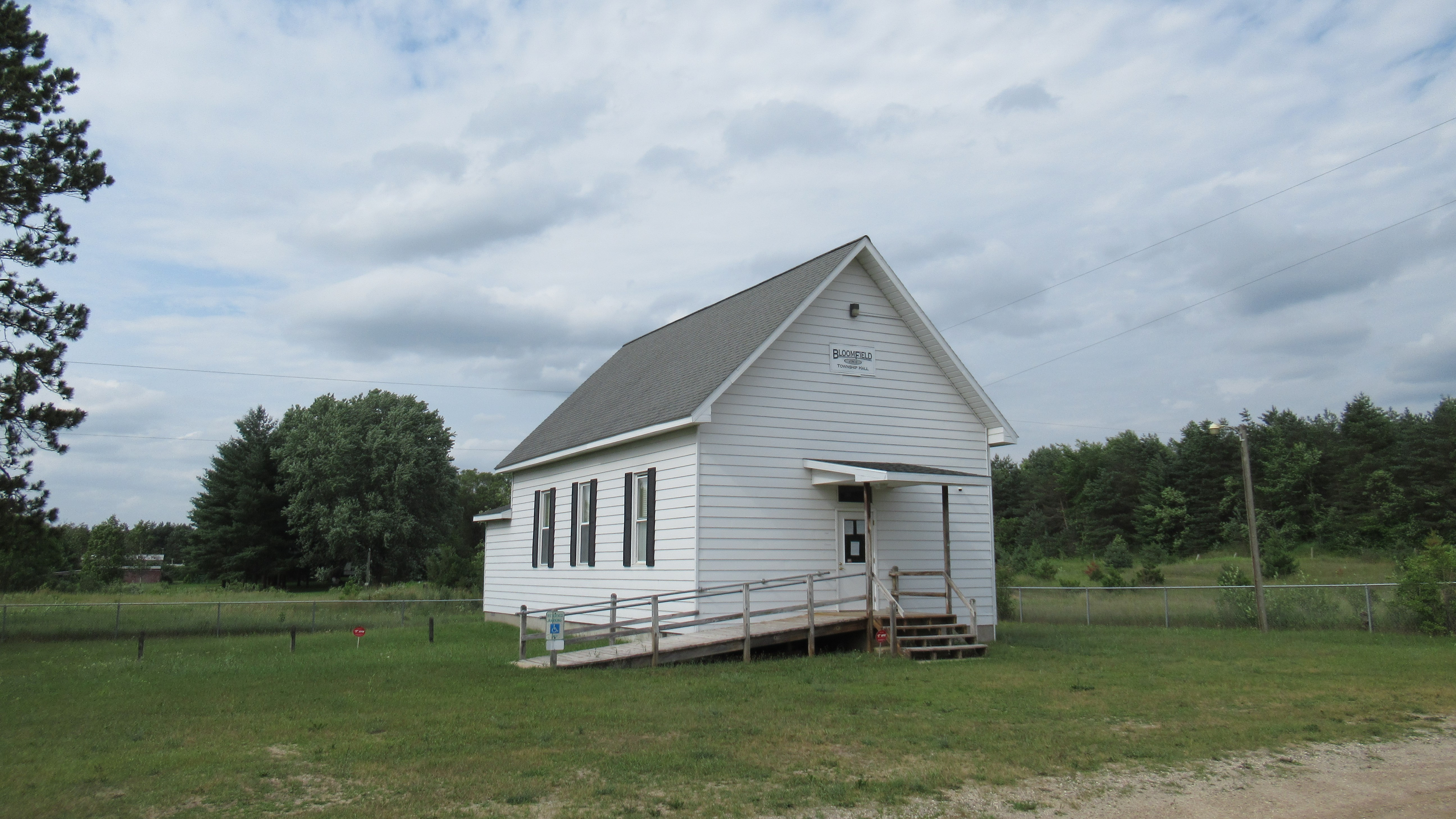
- Bloomfield Township Hall

- Location within Missaukee County

- Location within the state of Michigan Location within the United States
- Coordinates: 44°28′33″N 85°16′17″W
- Country: United States
- State: Michigan
- County: Missaukee
- Established: 1871

Government
  - Supervisor: Tim Bridson
  - Clerk: Cherrie Park

Area
  - Total: 35.73 sq mi (92.54 km^{2})
  - Land: 35.58 sq mi (92.15 km^{2})
  - Water: 0.15 sq mi (0.39 km^{2})
- Elevation: 1,056 ft (322 m)

Population (2020)
  - Total: 574
  - Density: 16.1/sq mi (6.2/km^{2})
- Time zone: UTC-5 (Eastern (EST))
  - Summer (DST): UTC-4 (EDT)
- ZIP code(s): 49663 (Manton); 49633 (Fife Lake); 49651 (Lake City)
- Area code: 231
- FIPS code: 26-09080
- GNIS feature ID: 1625951
- Website: Official website

Bloomfield Township is a civil township of Missaukee County in the U.S. state of Michigan. As of the 2020 census, the township population was 574.

== Geography ==
Bloomfield Township occupies the northwest corner of Missaukee County and is bordered to the north by Kalkaska County and to the west by Wexford County. It is touched at its northwest corner by Grand Traverse County. According to the U.S. Census Bureau, the township has a total area of 35.7 square miles (92.46 km^{2}), of which 35.6 square miles (92.20 km^{2}) are land and 0.1 square miles (0.26 km^{2}), or 0.41%, are water. The township is drained by tributaries of the Manistee River, which crosses the northwest portion of the township and flows west to Lake Michigan.

=== Adjacent townships ===
- Springfield Township, Kalkaska County (north)
- Garfield Township, Kalkaska County (northeast)
- Pioneer Township, Missaukee County (east)
- Forest Township, Missaukee County (southeast)
- Caldwell Township, Missaukee County (south)
- Cedar Creek Township, Wexford County (southwest)
- Liberty Township, Wexford County (west)
- Fife Lake Township, Grand Traverse County (northwest)

== Major highway ==
- M-66 forms a very small part of the boundary in the southeast corner of the township.

== Demographics ==
Historical population
| Census | Pop. | Note | %± |
|---|---|---|---|
| 1880 | 76 | | — |
| 1890 | 159 | | 109.2% |
| 1900 | 284 | | 78.6% |
| 1910 | 390 | | 37.3% |
| 1920 | 263 | | −32.6% |
| 1930 | 236 | | −10.3% |
| 1940 | 279 | | 18.2% |
| 1950 | 244 | | −12.5% |
| 1960 | 156 | | −36.1% |
| 1970 | 166 | | 6.4% |
| 1980 | 268 | | 61.4% |
| 1990 | 390 | | 45.5% |
| 2000 | 475 | | 21.8% |
| 2010 | 531 | | 11.8% |
| 2020 | 574 | | 8.1% |
U.S. Decennial Census

As of the census of 2000, there were 475 people, 182 households, and 141 families residing in the township. The population density was 13.3 inhabitants per square mile (5.1/km^{2}). There were 329 housing units at an average density of 9.2 per square mile (3.6/km^{2}). The racial makeup of the township was 95.58% White, 0.63% African American, 0.21% Native American, 0.42% Asian, 0.63% from other races, and 2.53% from two or more races. Hispanic or Latino of any race were 2.95% of the population.

There were 182 households, out of which 29.7% had children under the age of 18 living with them, 69.2% were married couples living together, 3.8% had a female householder with no husband present, and 22.5% were non-families. 17.6% of all households were made up of individuals, and 6.0% had someone living alone who was 65 years of age or older. The average household size was 2.61 and the average family size was 2.86.

In the township the population was spread out, with 25.1% under the age of 18, 6.9% from 18 to 24, 26.9% from 25 to 44, 29.1% from 45 to 64, and 12.0% who were 65 years of age or older. The median age was 39 years. For every 100 females, there were 116.9 males. For every 100 females age 18 and over, there were 110.7 males.

The median income for a household in the township was $37,500, and the median income for a family was $40,357. Males had a median income of $33,958 versus $19,375 for females. The per capita income for the township was $15,658. About 6.8% of families and 12.9% of the population were below the poverty line, including 23.0% of those under age 18 and 3.2% of those age 65 or over.
