= Rapid River (Delta County, Michigan) =

Location
- Country: USA
- State: Michigan
- Region: Upper Peninsula
- County: Marquette County, Delta County

Physical characteristics
- Source
  - location: near McFarland, southeast Marquette County, Michigan
  - coordinates: 46°09′38″N 87°14′13″W
- Mouth: Little Bay de Noc
  - location: Rapid River, Delta County, Michigan
  - coordinates: 45°54′57″N 86°57′46″W

The Rapid River is a 35.9-mile-long (57.8 km) river on the Upper Peninsula of the U.S. state of Michigan. It rises in southeast Marquette County and flows into Little Bay de Noc on Lake Michigan near the community of Rapid River. It was previously referred to as the Noquet River after the eponymous tribe until the late 19th century.

== See also ==
- County Road I-39–Rapid River Bridge
- List of rivers of Michigan
