= Brampton, Michigan =

- Unincorporated community
- Location within the state of Michigan Brampton (the United States)
- Coordinates: 45°55′53″N 87°04′14″W
- Country: United States
- State: Michigan
- County: Delta
- Township: Brampton
- Elevation: 738 ft (225 m)
- Time zone: UTC-5 (Eastern (EST))
  - Summer (DST): UTC-4 (EDT)
- ZIP code(s): 49837
- Area code: 906
- GNIS feature ID: 1619304

Brampton is an unincorporated community in Delta County, in the U.S. state of Michigan.

== History ==
A post office was established at Brampton in 1874, and remained in operation until it was discontinued in 1984. The community was named after the town of Brampton, in England.

== Climate ==
Brampton Lake

Climate chart (precipitation, max. and min. temperature)
J	F	M	A	M	J	J	A	S	O	N	D
63 −7 −14	52 −8 −15	55 −1 −8	78 9 −1	63 16 4	91 19 11	113 24 15	74 23 15	118 19 13	118 10 3	104 3 −2	64 −5 −10
- █ Average max. and min. temperatures in °C
- █ Precipitation totals in mm
Imperial conversion
J	F	M	A	M	J	J	A	S	O	N	D
2.5 19 7	2 18 5	2.2 30 18	3.1 48 30	2.5 61 39	3.6 66 52	4.4 75 59	2.9 73 59	4.6 66 55	4.6 50 37	4.1 37 28	2.5 23 14
- █ Average max. and min. temperatures in °F
- █ Precipitation totals in inches
