= Little Bay de Noc =

Bay in Michigan, United States of America

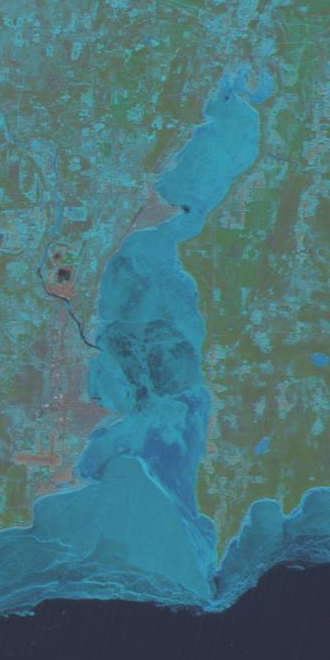
- Taken with Resourcesat-2 on March 20, 2022

- Location within Michigan Location within the United States
- Location: Delta County, Michigan
- Coordinates: 45°46′00″N 87°00′45″W
- Type: Bay
- Surface elevation: 581 feet (177 m)

Little Bay de Noc (/ˈnɔːk/ NAWK) is a bay in the Upper Peninsula of the U.S. state of Michigan. The bay opens into Lake Michigan's Green Bay. The bay, consisting of approximately 30,000 acres (120 km^{2}), is enclosed by Delta County. The cities of Escanaba and Gladstone are on the west side of the bay and the Stonington Peninsula is on the east side.

As with the larger Big Bay de Noc, the bay's name comes from the Noquet (or Noc), a Native American tribe indigenous to the Upper Peninsula who once lived along the shores. Former names for the bay as seen in 18th and 19th century colonial maps were Little Bay des Noquets and Little Noquet Bay.

Escanaba has a deep harbor, which made it a lumbering center. The first sawmill was built there in 1836. Douglass Houghton came to Escanaba's Sand Point in 1844 with his party of government surveyors to chart the land to the north. The bay also shipped iron ore from the rich iron ranges in Michigan's upper peninsula, with the first ore dock built at Escanaba in 1864. Escanaba was incorporated in 1866. A bit further north, Gladstone was founded in 1887 by U.S. Senator from Minnesota, William D. Washburn, to serve as a rail-lake terminal for lumber products.

The Escanaba, Days, Tacoosh, Rapid, and Whitefish rivers all drain into the bay. Rapid River marks the mouth of the eponymous river and the head of the bay.
