= Bloomfield Township, Polk County, Iowa =

Township in Polk County, Iowa, U.S.

Coordinates: 41.5295°N 93.6675°W

Bloomfield Township is a township in Polk County, Iowa, United States.

== History ==
Bloomfield Township was established in 1856. It was then given the name Bloomfield from the many fruit orchards cultivated within its borders.
