= Tacoosh River =

Location
- Country: United States
- State: Michigan
- Region: Upper Peninsula
- County: Delta County
- City: Rapid River

Physical characteristics
- Source
  - location: Maple Ridge Township
  - coordinates: 46°04′51″N 87°08′14″W
- Mouth: Little Bay de Noc
  - location: Rapid River
  - coordinates: 45°54′51″N 86°58′19″W
  - elevation: 581 ft (177 m)

The Tacoosh River is a 20.1-mile-long (32.3 km) river situated on the Upper Peninsula of Michigan in the United States. It flows into Lake Michigan at Little Bay de Noc.
