= Whitefish River (Michigan) =

Location
- Country: United States
- State: Michigan

National Wild and Scenic River
- Type: Scenic, Recreational
- Designated: March 3, 1992

The Whitefish River is an 11.9-mile-long (19.2 km) river on the Upper Peninsula of the U.S. state of Michigan. The mouth of the river is in Delta County at 45°54′34″N 86°58′01″W on the Little Bay De Noc of Lake Michigan. The main branch of the river is formed by the confluence of the east and west branches at 46°03′25″N 86°52′17″W.

The east branch rises out of Trout Lake in southwest Alger County. The west branch rises in southeast Marquette County.

== See also ==
- Laughing Whitefish River, which flows north through Alger County
