= Fife Lake Township, Michigan =

- Civil township
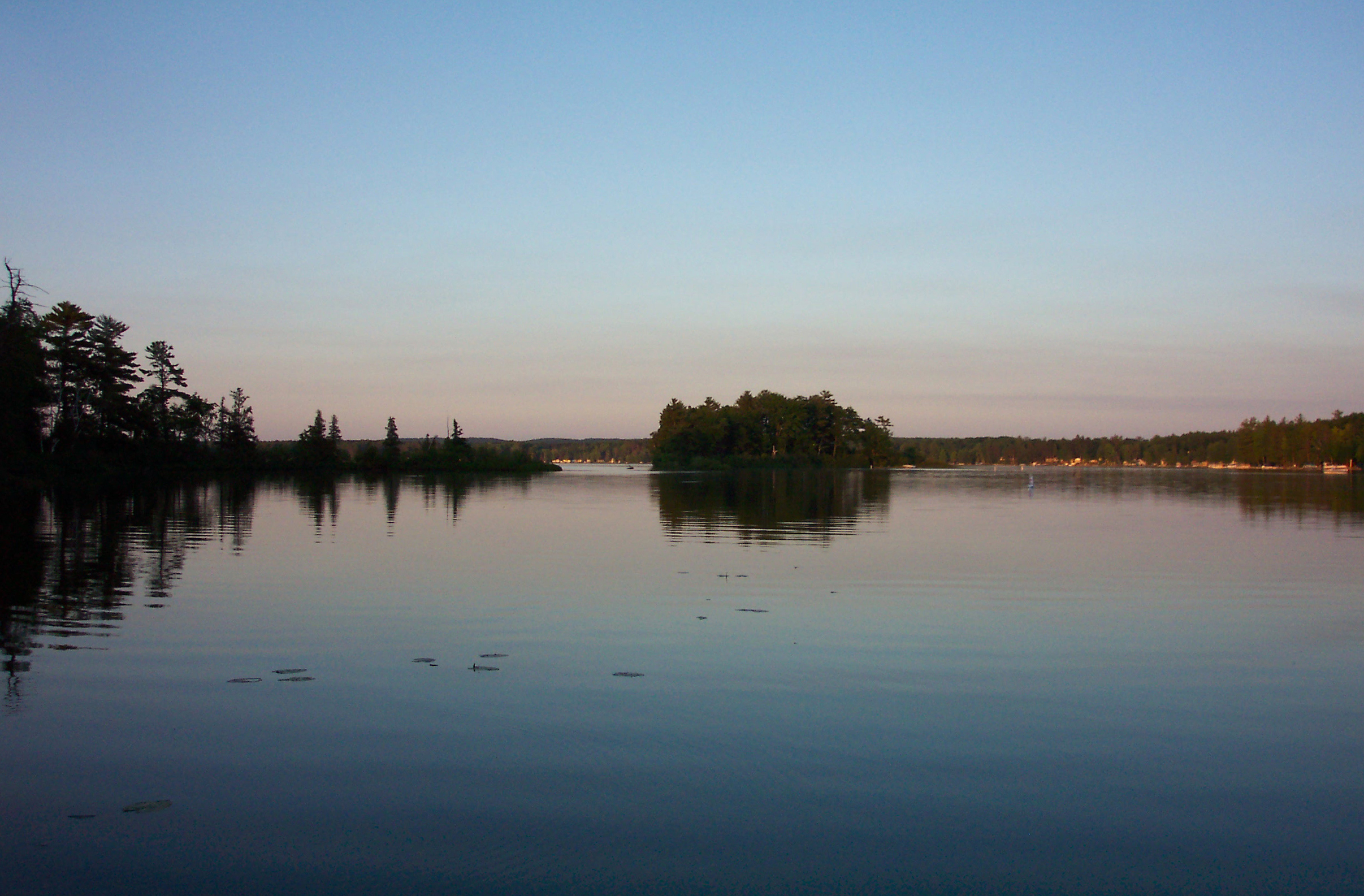
- View of Fife Lake

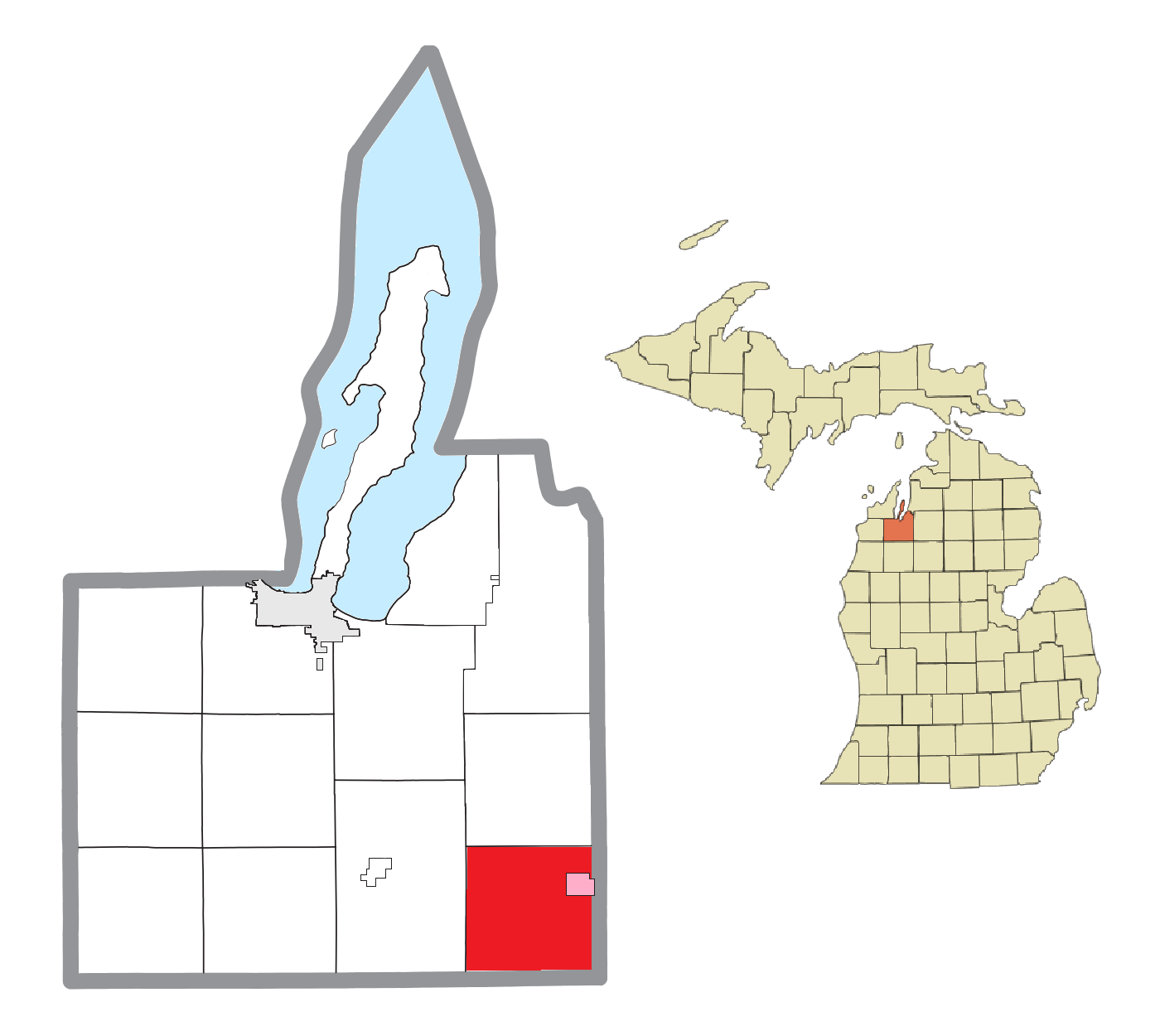
- Location within Grand Traverse County (red) and the administered village of Fife Lake (pink)

- Location within the state of Michigan Fife Lake Township (the United States)
- Coordinates: 44°33′12″N 85°23′11″W
- Country: United States
- State: Michigan
- County: Grand Traverse
- Established: 1872

Government
  - Supervisor: Lisa Leedy

Area
  - Total: 35.9 sq mi (93.1 km^{2})
  - Land: 34.4 sq mi (89.1 km^{2})
  - Water: 1.5 sq mi (4.0 km^{2})
- Elevation: 1,073 ft (327 m)

Population (2020)
  - Total: 1,526
  - Density: 42/sq mi (16.4/km^{2})
- Time zone: UTC-5 (Eastern (EST))
  - Summer (DST): UTC-4 (EDT)
- ZIP code(s): 49633 (Fife Lake); 49649 (Kingsley)
- Area code: 231
- FIPS code: 26-28020
- GNIS feature ID: 1626281
- Website: Official website

Fife Lake Township is a civil township of Grand Traverse County in the U.S. state of Michigan. As of the 2020 census, the township population was 1,526, a slight increase from 1,517 at the 2000 census. The village of Fife Lake is located within the township.

== Communities ==
- Fife Lake is a village within the township at the junction of U.S. Route 131 and M-186.
- Hodge, a ghost town (44.541178°N 85.455911°W)
- Holmes, a ghost town (44.537172°N 85.445278°W)
- McManus Corner, a ghost town (44.541178°N 85.455911°W)
- Walton is an unincorporated community in the township near the junction of US 131 and M-113 at 44°31′15″N 85°23′58″W. Walton Junction is a place just north of the community, named for the junction of two railroad lines, and is now at the junction of US 131 and M-113.

== Geography ==
According to the United States Census Bureau, the township has a total area of 36.0 square miles (93 km^{2}), of which 34.4 square miles (89 km^{2}) is land and 1.6 square miles (4.1 km^{2}) (4.34%) is water.

Fife Lake Township forms the southeastern corner of Grand Traverse County. It shares boundaries with Kalkaska County, to the east, Missaukee County, to the southeast, and Wexford County, to the south.

=== Adjacent townships ===
- Union Township, Grand Traverse County (north)
- Boardman Township, Kalkaska County (northeast)
- Springfield Township, Kalkaska County (east)
- Bloomfield Township, Missaukee County (southeast)
- Liberty Township, Wexford County (south)
- Greenwood Township, Wexford County (southwest)
- Paradise Township, Grand Traverse County (west)

=== Major highways ===
- US 131 runs northeast–southwest through the township, skirting west of the village of Fife Lake. The highway exits east into Kalkaska County, and south into Wexford County. South of the Wexford County line, the highway converts to a freeway.
- M-113 primarily runs north–south through Fife Lake Township, beginning at a junction with US 131 near Walton. However, in the northwest of the township, the highway makes a 90-degree curve, running due west through Kingsley, ending south of Traverse City at a junction with M-37
- M-186 is a short highway between M-113 and US 131. The highway is located entirely within Fife Lake Township, serving as a connector between M-113 and the village of Fife Lake.

== Demographics ==
As of the census of 2000, there were 1,517 people, 562 households, and 397 families residing in the township. The population density was 44.1 inhabitants per square mile (17.0/km^{2}). There were 779 housing units at an average density of 22.7 per square mile (8.8/km^{2}). The racial makeup of the township was 90.44% White, 4.88% African American, 1.71% Native American, 0.07% Pacific Islander, 0.26% from other races, and 2.64% from two or more races. Hispanic or Latino of any race were 0.92% of the population.

There were 562 households, out of which 31.5% had children under the age of 18 living with them, 58.9% were married couples living together, 7.7% had a female householder with no husband present, and 29.2% were non-families. 23.7% of all households were made up of individuals, and 9.4% had someone living alone who was 65 years of age or older. The average household size was 2.48 and the average family size was 2.91.

In the township the population was spread out, with 23.7% under the age of 18, 7.1% from 18 to 24, 33.9% from 25 to 44, 22.1% from 45 to 64, and 13.1% who were 65 years of age or older. The median age was 37 years. For every 100 females, there were 118.6 males. For every 100 females age 18 and over, there were 124.2 males.

The median income for a household in the township was $36,667, and the median income for a family was $42,813. Males had a median income of $28,977 versus $21,736 for females. The per capita income for the township was $18,739. About 6.5% of families and 8.7% of the population were below the poverty line, including 10.8% of those under age 18 and 3.1% of those age 65 or over.
