= Brampton Township, Michigan =

- Civil township
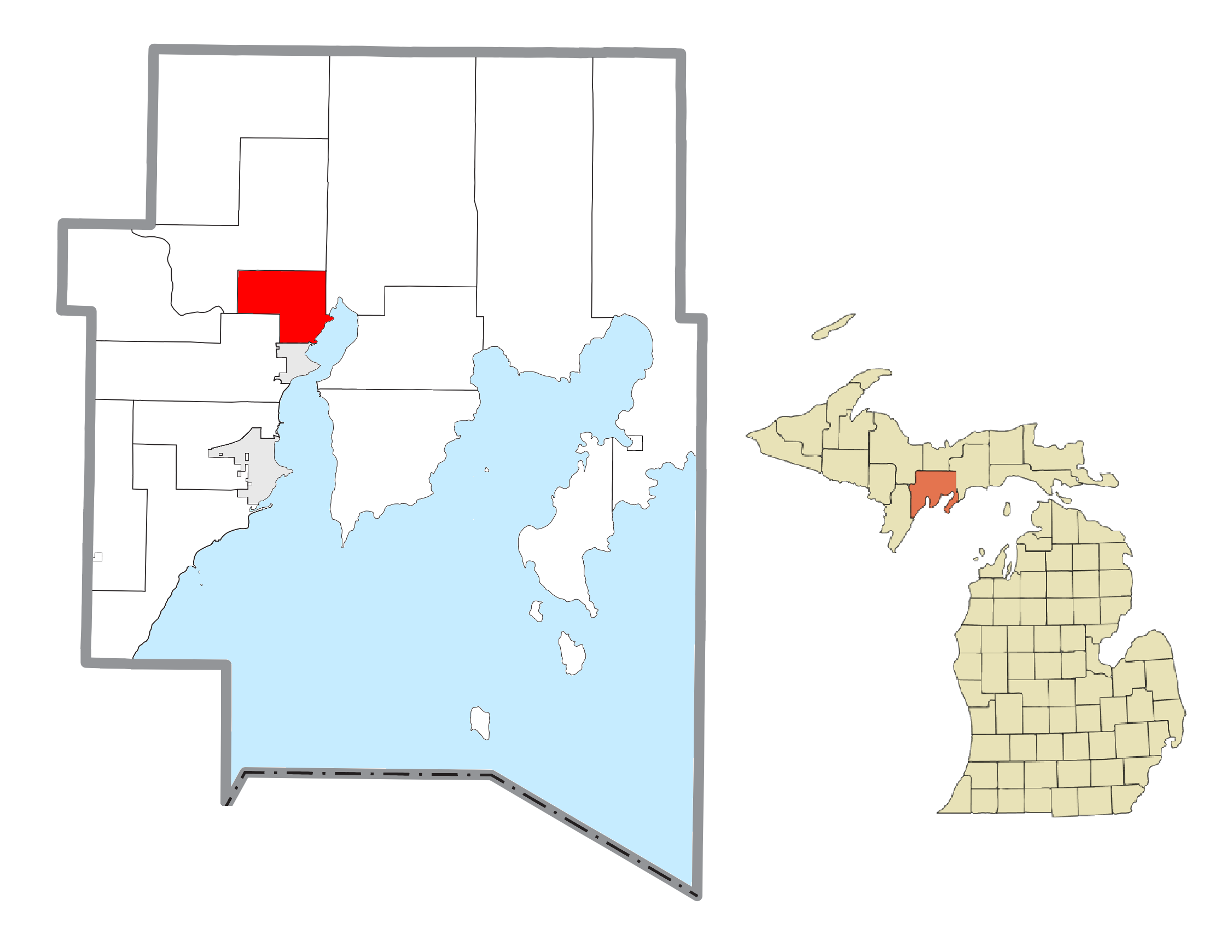
- Location within Delta County

- Location within the state of Michigan Brampton Township (the United States)
- Coordinates: 45°53′59″N 87°02′34″W
- Country: United States
- State: Michigan
- County: Delta

Government
  - Supervisor: Janice Ketcham

Area
  - Total: 25.6 sq mi (66.3 km^{2})
  - Land: 23.7 sq mi (61.4 km^{2})
  - Water: 1.9 sq mi (4.9 km^{2})
- Elevation: 709 ft (216 m)

Population (2020)
  - Total: 1,023
  - Density: 43.2/sq mi (16.7/km^{2})
- Time zone: UTC-5 (Eastern (EST))
  - Summer (DST): UTC-4 (EDT)
- ZIP code(s): 49837
- Area code: 906
- FIPS code: 26-09980
- GNIS feature ID: 1625969

Brampton Township is a civil township of Delta County in the U.S. state of Michigan. As of the 2020 census, the township population was 1,023, down from 1,050 at the 2010 census.

== Geography ==
According to the United States Census Bureau, the township has a total area of 25.6 square miles (66 km^{2}), of which 23.7 square miles (61 km^{2}) is land and 1.9 square miles (4.9 km^{2}) (7.35%) is water.

== Demographics ==
As of the census of 2000, there were 1,090 people, 430 households, and 322 families residing in the township. The population density was 46.0 inhabitants per square mile (17.8/km^{2}). There were 483 housing units at an average density of 20.4 per square mile (7.9/km^{2}). The racial makeup of the township was 96.61% White, 0.09% African American, 1.56% Native American, 0.09% Asian, 0.09% from other races, and 1.56% from two or more races. Hispanic or Latino of any race were 0.73% of the population.

There were 430 households, out of which 29.1% had children under the age of 18 living with them, 68.4% were married couples living together, 4.4% had a female householder with no husband present, and 25.1% were non-families. 21.6% of all households were made up of individuals, and 7.9% had someone living alone who was 65 years of age or older. The average household size was 2.49 and the average family size was 2.92.

In the township the population was demographically spread out, with 22.6% under the age of 18, 6.7% from 18 to 24, 25.8% from 25 to 44, 30.6% from 45 to 64, and 14.4% who were 65 years of age or older. The median age was 42 years. For every 100 females, there were 100.7 males. For every 100 females age 18 and over, there were 99.5 males.

The median income for a household in the township was $45,441, and the median income for a family was $52,614. Males had a median income of $42,500 versus $22,917 for females. The per capita income for the township was $18,893. About 5.4% of families and 6.3% of the population were below the poverty line, including 7.9% of those under age 18 and 6.8% of those age 65 or over.
