= Fife Lake, Michigan =

- Village
- Village of Fife Lake
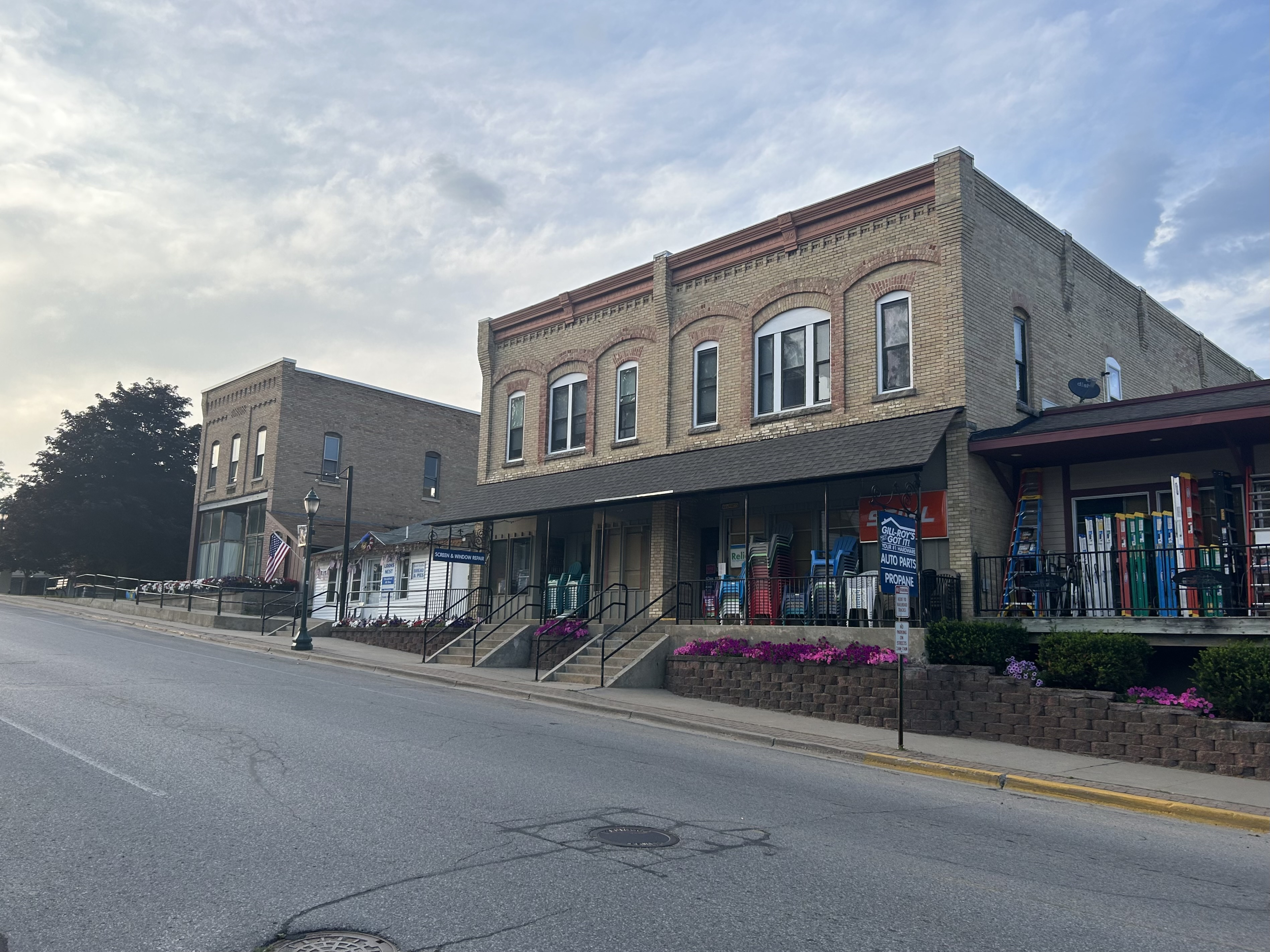
- Buildings along E. State Street in Fife Lake
- Nicknames: "Fife", "F.L."
- Motto: In the Heart of the Forest
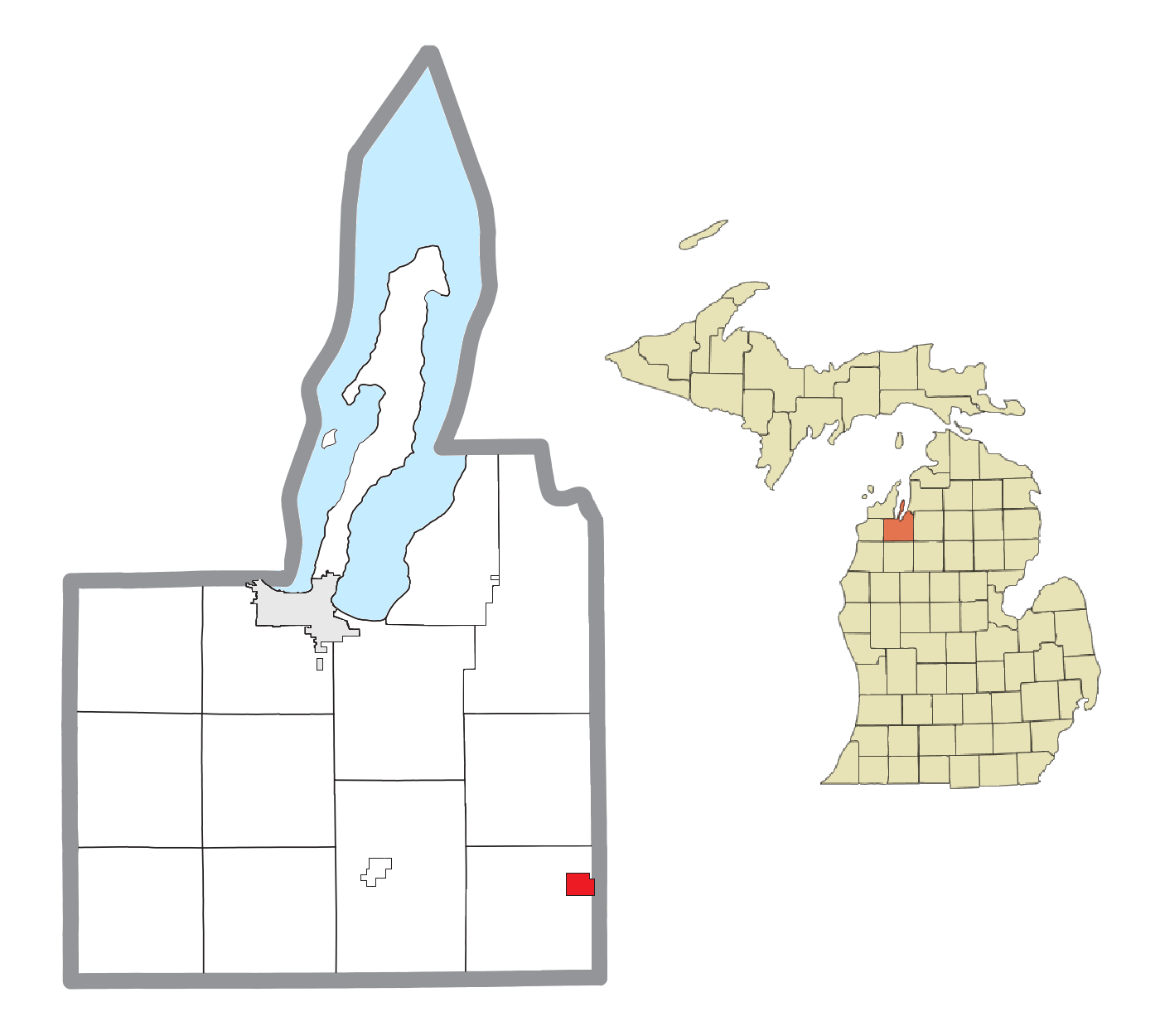
- Location within Grand Traverse County

- Location within the state of Michigan
- Coordinates: 44°34′34″N 85°21′06″W
- Country: United States
- State: Michigan
- County: Grand Traverse
- Township: Fife Lake
- Founded: 1872
- Incorporated: 1889
- Founder: J.L. Shaw

Government
  - Village president: Tom Hempsted

Area
  - Total: 1.17 sq mi (3.03 km^{2})
  - Land: 0.73 sq mi (1.88 km^{2})
  - Water: 0.44 sq mi (1.15 km^{2})
- Elevation: 1,060 ft (323 m)

Population (2020)
  - Total: 456
  - Density: 627.7/sq mi (242.37/km^{2})
- Time zone: UTC-5 (Eastern (EST))
  - Summer (DST): UTC-4 (EDT)
- ZIP code(s): 49633
- Area code: 231
- FIPS code: 26-28000
- GNIS feature ID: 0625937
- Website: www.fifelake.com

Fife Lake (/faɪf/ FYFE) is a village in southeastern Grand Traverse County in the U.S. state of Michigan. Its population was 456 at the 2020 census, up from 443 at the 2010 census. The village is part of the Traverse City metropolitan area, and lies upon the shore of the lake of the same name.

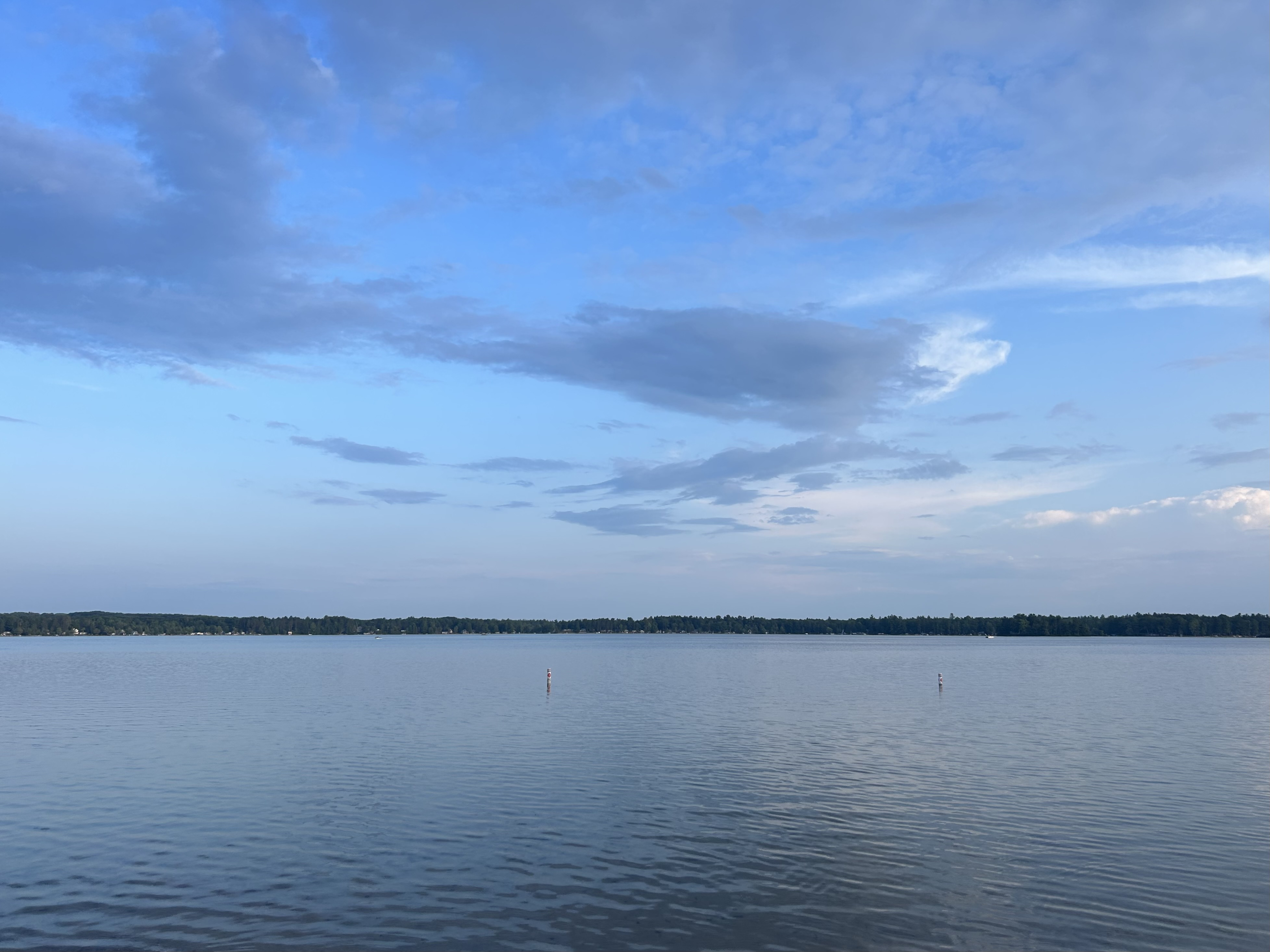
Fife Lake from Lakeside Park

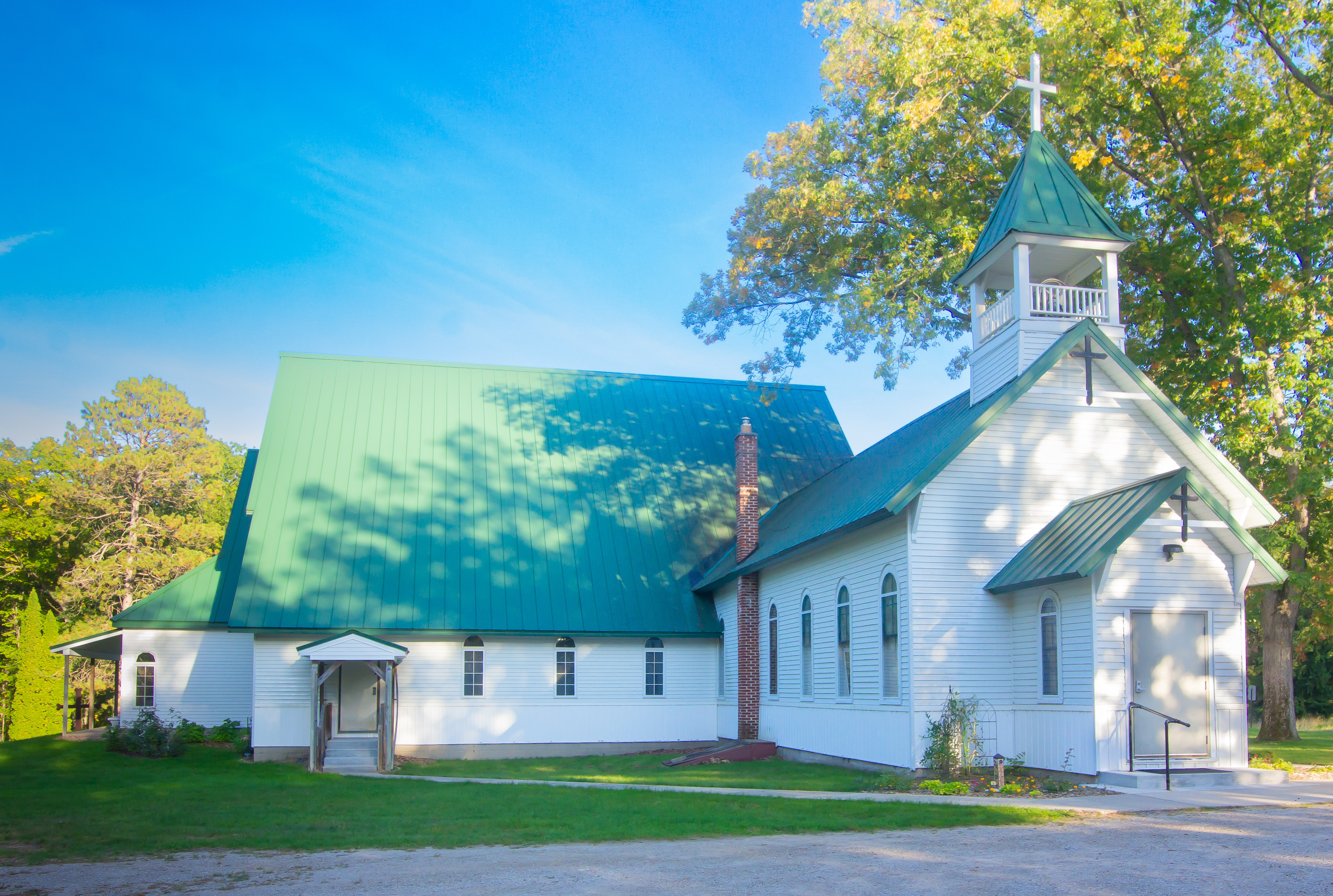
St. Aloysius Catholic Church in Fife Lake

== History ==
In 1872, J.L. Shaw and others platted two small settlements on a lake on the new Grand Rapids and Indiana Railroad. These were known as North Fife Lake and Fyfe Lake (a misspelling of Fife), which were on the north and west sides of Fife Lake, respectively. Later that year, Fife Lake Township was created. The first church in the village was established in 1884. In 1889, Fife Lake was incorporated as a village.

On August 4, 2026, a ballot proposal to disincorporate the village of Fife Lake was rejected by voters. Had this passed, Fife Lake would have been the first Michigan village to voluntarily disincorporate.

The village annually hosts the Fife Lake Ice Fishing Derby near the end of January.

== Geography ==
According to the United States Census Bureau, the village has a total area of 1.20 square miles (3.11 km^{2}), of which 0.75 square miles (1.94 km^{2}) is land and 0.45 square miles (1.17 km^{2}) is water. The village is located in Fife Lake Township, and is adjacent to the eponymous lake, upon the lake's northern and western shores.

The village is located immediately west of the Kalkaska County line. Fife Lake is the only community in Grand Traverse County to be located east of US Highway 131.

== Demographics ==
Historical population
Census	Pop.	Note	%±
1890	394		—
1900	456		15.7%
1910	340		−25.4%
1920	215		−36.8%
1930	227		5.6%
1940	303		33.5%
1950	347		14.5%
1960	218		−37.2%
1970	274		25.7%
1980	402		46.7%
1990	394		−2.0%
2000	466		18.3%
2010	443		−4.9%
2020	456		2.9%
U.S. Decennial Census

=== 2010 census ===
As of the census of 2010, there were 443 people, 189 households, and 110 families residing in the village. The population density was 590.7 inhabitants per square mile (228.1/km^{2}). There were 265 housing units at an average density of 353.3 per square mile (136.4/km^{2}). The racial makeup of the village was 95.7% White, 0.7% African American, 1.6% Native American, and 2.0% from two or more races. Hispanic or Latino of any race were 1.8% of the population.

There were 189 households, of which 27.5% had children under the age of 18 living with them, 40.2% were married couples living together, 11.6% had a female householder with no husband present, 6.3% had a male householder with no wife present, and 41.8% were non-families. 30.7% of all households were made up of individuals, and 12.1% had someone living alone who was 65 years of age or older. The average household size was 2.34 and the average family size was 2.89.

The median age in the village was 41.1 years. 22.8% of residents were under the age of 18; 6.7% were between the ages of 18 and 24; 25.4% were from 25 to 44; 29.3% were from 45 to 64; and 15.6% were 65 years of age or older. The gender makeup of the village was 49.0% male and 51.0% female.

=== 2000 census ===
As of the census of 2000, there were 466 people, 185 households, and 120 families residing in the village. The population density was 632.1 inhabitants per square mile (244.1/km^{2}). There were 256 housing units at an average density of 347.3 per square mile (134.1/km^{2}). The racial makeup of the village was 90.77% White, 0.64% African American, 3.22% Native American, and 5.36% from two or more races. Hispanic or Latino of any race were 0.21% of the population.

There were 185 households, out of which 35.7% had children under the age of 18 living with them, 51.4% were married couples living together, 9.7% had a female householder with no husband present, and 34.6% were non-families. 28.1% of all households were made up of individuals, and 11.4% had someone living alone who was 65 years of age or older. The average household size was 2.52 and the average family size was 3.07.

In the village, the population was spread out, with 28.8% under the age of 18, 7.9% from 18 to 24, 30.5% from 25 to 44, 23.4% from 45 to 64, and 9.4% who were 65 years of age or older. The median age was 35 years. For every 100 females, there were 98.3 males. For every 100 females age 18 and over, there were 96.4 males.

The median income for a household in the village was $32,361, and the median income for a family was $42,188. Males had a median income of $32,083 versus $24,375 for females. The per capita income for the village was $19,024. About 9.4% of families and 13.8% of the population were below the poverty line, including 18.0% of those under age 18 and none of those age 65 or over.

== Climate ==
This climatic region has large seasonal temperature differences, with warm to hot (and often humid) summers and cold (sometimes severely cold) winters. According to the Köppen Climate Classification system, Fife Lake has a humid continental climate, abbreviated "Dfb" on climate maps.

Climate data for Fife Lake, Michigan
Month	Jan	Feb	Mar	Apr	May	Jun	Jul	Aug	Sep	Oct	Nov	Dec	Year
Mean daily maximum °C (°F)	0 (32)	−3 (27)	−2 (29)	3 (38)	12 (53)	19 (67)	25 (77)	27 (81)	26 (78)	21 (70)	14 (58)	6 (43)	12 (54)
Mean daily minimum °C (°F)	−12 (10)	−13 (8)	−8 (17)	−2 (29)	4 (39)	9 (49)	12 (53)	11 (52)	8 (46)	3 (37)	−3 (27)	−9 (16)	0 (32)
Average precipitation mm (inches)	48 (1.9)	36 (1.4)	46 (1.8)	66 (2.6)	66 (2.6)	79 (3.1)	76 (3)	74 (2.9)	89 (3.5)	74 (2.9)	71 (2.8)	56 (2.2)	780 (30.8)
Source: Weatherbase

== Transportation ==
=== Air travel ===
The nearest airport with commercial service is Cherry Capital Airport in Traverse City. Smaller landing strips are nearby, though, such as Kalkaska City Airport in Kalkaska.

=== Major highways ===
- US 131 runs northeast–southwest just west of the village business district, providing access to Indiana, Grand Rapids, Cadillac, Kalkaska, and Petoskey
- M-186 runs west from the town towards M-113, providing access to Kingsley and the Traverse City area.

=== Railroads ===
Fife Lake used to be a station on the Grand Rapids and Indiana Railroad. Today, it is served by the Great Lakes Central Railroad. However, Fife Lake is no longer a station.

== Education ==
Fife Lake is served by the Forest Area Community Schools District. The district includes Fife Lake Elementary School and Forest Area Middle/High School, located in neighboring Springfield Township.

== Notable people ==
- Jerry Cannon, retired Brigadier General, U.S. Army
- Ralph Crego, mayor of Lansing, Michigan, from 1943 to 1961
