= National Register of Historic Places listings in Delta County, Michigan =

Location of Delta County in Michigan

This is a list of the National Register of Historic Places listings in Delta County, Michigan.

This is intended to be a complete list of the properties and districts on the National Register of Historic Places in Delta County, Michigan, United States. Latitude and longitude coordinates are provided for many National Register properties and districts; these locations may be seen together in a map.

There are 19 properties and districts listed on the National Register in the county.

This National Park Service list is complete through NPS recent listings posted June 6, 2026.

== Current listings ==
	Name on the Register	Image	Date listed	Location	City or town	Description
1	Camp Delta – Delta Resort	Camp Delta – Delta Resort	May 1, 2017 (#100000935)	17049 Foote Lake Rd. 46°09′27″N 86°29′28″W	Garden Township	
2	Carnegie Public Library	Carnegie Public Library	July 25, 1977 (#77000712)	201 S. 7th St. 45°44′39″N 87°03′22″W	Escanaba	The Escanaba Carnegie Public Library is a Carnegie library constructed in 1902 with $20,000 in funds donated by Andrew Carnegie. It is a one-story Classical Revival building constructed of red brick and Lake Superior Sandstone. The library moved to a new location in 1995, and the old Carnegie building was sold to private owners, who refurbished it with the intention of converting it into a private home.
3	County Road I-39 – Rapid River Bridge	County Road I-39 – Rapid River Bridge	December 9, 1999 (#99001511)	County Road I-39 over Rapid River; 46°01′22″N 86°58′44″W	Masonville Township	The County Road I-39 – Rapid River Bridge was built in 1916, and is the oldest example of a concrete girder bridge designed for the state trunk line system.
4	Delta Hotel	Delta Hotel	April 9, 1998 (#98000350)	624 Ludington St. 45°44′46″N 87°03′22″W	Escanaba	The Delta Hotel is a five story, 66 feet (20 m) high Classical Revival structure that opened in 1914. It operated as a hotel until 1962 when it was sold to the Roman Catholic Diocese of Marquette and converted into the Bishop Noa Home for Senior Citizens. The Bishop Noa Home moved from the building in 1992, and the building was renovated to house a brewpub on the first floor and apartments on the upper floors.
5	Escanaba Central Historic District	Escanaba Central Historic District	April 7, 2014 (#14000123)	Roughly 200-1800 blocks Ludington St. 45°44′45″N 87°03′41″W	Escanaba	This district runs for over a mile along Ludington Street in the heart of Escanaba, with building ages generally progressing from east to west, echoing the development of the city. It starts in the 200 block with the House of Ludington, portions of which may date to the 1860s, to the small commercial buildings in the 1600 block which date to the beginning of the 20th century.
6	Fayette	Fayette	February 16, 1970 (#70000269)	On a peninsula in Big Bay de Noc, on M-183 in Fayette State Park; 45°42′50″N 86°40′00″W	Fayette	From 1867 to 1891, Fayette was the site of the Upper Peninsula's most productive iron smelting operation. Nearly 500 people lived in the nearby town. The town has been reconstructed into a state park and living museum showing what life was like in the late 19th century. A 1996 boundary increase (added 1996-12-26) increased the historic district to include the entire Fayette State Park.
7	Gooseneck Lake III Site		June 27, 2014 (#14000369)	Near Gooseneck Lake; 46°04′20″N 86°32′43″W	Escanaba vicinity	An archaeological site which is part of the Woodland Period Archaeological Sites of the Indian River and Fishdam River Basins MPS.
8	Gooseneck Lake IV Site		June 27, 2014 (#14000370)	Near Gooseneck Lake; 46°04′20″N 86°32′43″W	Escanaba vicinity	An archaeological site which is part of the Woodland Period Archaeological Sites of the Indian River and Fishdam River Basins MPS.
9	Jackpine Lake Site		June 27, 2014 (#14000371)	Near Jackpine Lake; 46°07′08″N 86°30′53″W	Escanaba vicinity	An archaeological site which is part of the Woodland Period Archaeological Sites of the Indian River and Fishdam River Basins MPS.
10	Minneapolis Shoal Light Station	Minneapolis Shoal Light Station	November 15, 2006 (#06001025)	In northern Green Bay 6.6 mi (10.6 km) south of Peninsula Point, northwest of Lake Michigan; 45°32′10″N 86°59′54″W	Bay de Noc	The Minneapolis Shoal Light Station, completed in 1934, is a twin of Grays Reef Light Station, built at approximately the same time. The Light Station sits on a square reinforced concrete pier, 30 feet (9.1 m) high and 64 feet (20 m) on a side. Atop the pier is a two-story base, 15 feet (4.6 m) high and 30 feet (9.1 m) on a side. The cellar and first floor of the base was built to house equipment, while the second floor housed the keeper's quarters. The 17 feet (5.2 m) tall lighthouse tower is placed in the center of the building roof.
11	Nahma and Northern Railway Locomotive #5	Nahma and Northern Railway Locomotive #5	January 30, 2007 (#06001327)	Main St. at River St. 45°50′27″N 86°39′51″W	Nahma Township	This locomotive is a 2-6-2 coal-burning locomotive, built by the Baldwin Company of Philadelphia in 1912. It was run on the Nahma and Northern, a line built by the Bay De Noquet Lumber Company in 1901 and leading from Nahma into the surrounding forest and various lumber camps.
12	Peninsula Point Lighthouse	Peninsula Point Lighthouse	April 28, 1975 (#75000941)	6.5 mi (10.5 km) southeast of Escanaba in Hiawatha National Forest; 45°40′05″N 86°58′00″W	Stonington	The Peninsula Point Lighthouse was built in 1865, and sits astride the St. Martin Island passage leading to Escanaba. The light was in use until 1936, when the Minneapolis Shoal Light Station went into service. The following year, the USDA-Forest Service "was granted custodianship," and the building was repaired and public picnic grounds were constructed by the Civilian Conservation Corps. The attached keeper's house burned in 1956.
13	Poverty Island Light Station	Poverty Island Light Station	September 6, 2005 (#05000984)	Northwestern Lake Michigan, 5.8 mi (9.3 km) south of Garden Peninsula at Fairport; 45°31′38″N 86°39′49″W	Fairbanks Township	The Poverty Island Light was built in 1873-75, and used until 1976 when a newer light was built nearby. The light, with its white conical tower, was designed to be a near duplicate of the Sturgeon Point Light. In the 1980s the lantern was rescued by the Delta County Historical Society, who used it to refurbish the Sand Point Light in Escanaba. The lighthouse remains abandoned and in disrepair, and in 2011 was declared by Lighthouse Digest to be "America’s Most Endangered Lighthouse."
14	Richter Brewery	Richter Brewery	April 15, 2009 (#09000202)	1615 Ludington St. 45°44′44″N 87°04′14″W	Escanaba	The Richter Brewery was built in 1900 and used by the Richter Brewing Company until Prohibition. The building was then used to manufacture non-alcoholic beverages. At the end of Prohibition, it was sold to the Delta Brewery Company (and renamed the Delta Building), who again used the building to brew beer until it went bankrupt in 1940. After years of vacancy, the building was rehabilitated in 2008-12 into the Lofts on Ludington, a loft space.
15	Sand Lighthouse	Sand Lighthouse	December 1, 1997 (#97001474)	12 Waterplant Rd. 45°44′40″N 87°02′40″W	Escanaba	The Sand Point Lighthouse was constructed in 1867-68 as an aid to ships entering Escanaba's harbor. The light is unique in that it was constructed with its tower facing the land instead of facing the water. Whether this orientation was intentional or an engineering blunder is unknown. The light was active until 1939, after which it was used as a residence for Coast Guard seamen. In 1986, the Delta County Historical Society obtained the lught and restored it.
16	Spider Cave	Spider Cave	April 16, 1971 (#71001021)	At the base of Burnt Bluff; 45°41′00″N 86°42′00″W	Fayette vicinity	Spider Cave is a water-cut cave located 20 feet (6.1 m) above the base of Burnt Bluff on the shore of Big Bay de Noc. Four pictographs are within the cave and on the walls near the entrance. Most of the artifacts collected from the cave were Middle Woodland period projectile points with shattered tips, suggesting they were fired into the cave from without and had shattered against the rear wall.
17	St. Martin Island Light Station	St. Martin Island Light Station	July 19, 1984 (#84001387)	St. Martin Island; 45°30′10″N 86°45′27″W	Fairport	St. Martin Island Light is a unique exoskeleton lighthouse that marks one of four passages between Lake Michigan and the bay of Green Bay. The hexagonal tower is made of iron plates which are supported by six exterior steel posts that have latticed buttresses. Constructed in 1905, this light tower is the only example of a pure exoskeletal tower on the US side of the Great Lakes.
18	Summer Island Site	Summer Island Site	September 3, 1971 (#71000388)	Near Summer Harbor on the NW side of the island 45°34′00″N 86°38′00″W	Summer Island	This site was likely utilized as a late summer fishing ground by a number of Native American cultures, from the Middle and Late Woodland periods and later peoples after contact with European settlers. The site is located on a sandy meadow above Summer Harbor, and was used as a late summer and early fall fishing village.
19	Winter Site		May 19, 1976 (#76001027)	On a small tributary of Big Bay de Noc; 45°50′00″N 86°32′00″W	Garden	The Winter Site, located near the Lake Michigan coast, represented early experimentation in late fall and winter subsistence inhabitation of coastal areas by Middle Woodland period peoples.

== Former listings ==
	Name on the Register	Image	Date listed	Date removed	Location	Description
1	Bay de Noquet Lumber Company Waste Burner	Bay de Noquet Lumber Company Waste Burner	April 8, 2011 (#11000177)	June 10, 2020	South end of River St. 45°50′07″N 86°39′35″W	The Bay de Noquet Lumber Company Waste Burner was a round tower, 32 feet (9.8 m) in diameter on the outside and approximately 100 feet (30 m) tall. It is constructed of cast iron plates lined with brick. It was constructed sometime between 1888 and 1893 to eliminate the sawmill waste produced by the Bay de Noquet Lumber Company operation located at the site. It collapsed in 2019.

== See also ==
- List of National Historic Landmarks in Michigan
- National Register of Historic Places listings in Michigan
- Listings in neighboring counties: Alger, Marquette, Menominee, Schoolcraft
- List of Michigan State Historic Sites in Delta County, Michigan
