= List of Michigan State Historic Sites in Delta County =

Location of Delta County in Michigan

The following is a list of Michigan State Historic Sites in Delta County, Michigan. Sites marked with a dagger (†) are also listed on the National Register of Historic Places in Delta County, Michigan.

== Current listings ==
Name	Image	Location	City	Listing date
Charles Brotherton House	Charles Brotherton House	606 Ogden Avenue	Escanaba	October 12, 1990
Carnegie Public Library†		201 South 7th Street	Escanaba	January 16, 1976
Samuel Elliot Farm	Samuel Elliot Farm	13250 8th Rd.	Sac Bay	November 14, 1974
Fayette†		County Road 483, between Garden and Fairport, in Fayette State Park	Fayette	August 23, 1956
Grand Island Indian Trail Informational Designation		US 2, just east of Whitefish River	Rapid River	May 4, 1966
Escanaba River-The Legend Informational Designation	Escanaba River-The Legend	Escanaba River, Pioneer Trail Park, US 2/US 41/M-35, 1 mile north of Escanaba	Escanaba	May 4, 1966
Little Bay de Noc Informational Designation	Little Bay De Noc	Roadside City Park on Lake Shore Drive	Escanaba	April 2, 1957
Ludington Hotel	Ludington Hotel	223 Ludington Street	Escanaba	February 23, 1981
Maple Ridge Workers Association Hall	Maple Ridge Workers Assoc	14398 M-35	Rock	July 26, 1978
Saint Lawrence Catholic Church	St. Lawrence Catholic Church-Nahma	8240 River	Nahma	February 11, 1972
Sand Point Lighthouse†		12 Waterplant Road	Escanaba	February 25, 1988
Squaw Point Boathouse	Squaw Point Boathouse	12 Waterplant Road	Escanaba	October 12, 1990
Sawmills Informational Designation	The Lumberman	Escanaba River, Pioneer Trail Park, US 2/US 41/M-35, 1 mile north of Escanaba	Escanaba	May 4, 1966
Webster School Annex (demolished)		1219 North 19th Street	Escanaba	June 6, 1977
Henry Frank Wnuck Homestead		10921 US 41	Rapid River	July 15, 1999

== See also ==
- National Register of Historic Places listings in Delta County, Michigan

== Sources ==
- Historic Sites Online – Delta County. Michigan State Housing Developmental Authority. Accessed January 23, 2011.
