= Bay de Noquet Lumber Company Waste Burner =

- Formerly listed on the U.S. National Register of Historic Places
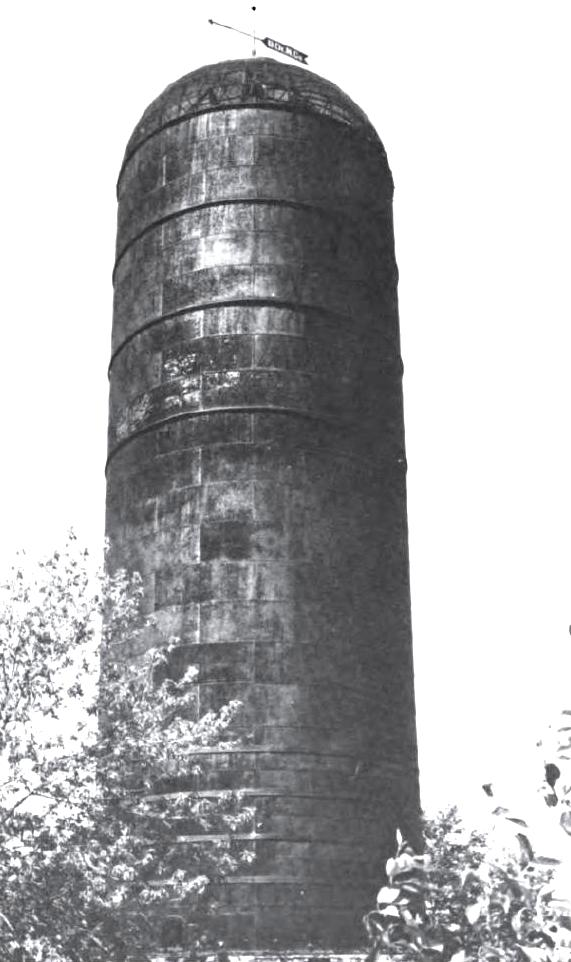
- Waste burner c. 1978

- Location within Michigan Location within the United States
- Interactive map
- Location: South end of River St., Nahma Township, Michigan
- Coordinates: 45°50′7″N 86°39′35″W
- Built: c. 1888 - 1893
- Demolished: 2019
- NRHP reference No.: 11000177

Significant dates
- Added to NRHP: April 8, 2011
- Removed from NRHP: June 10, 2020

The Bay de Noquet Lumber Company Waste Burner was an industrial waste burner located at the south end of River Street in Nahma Township, Michigan. It was built to burn waste wood and bark from the nearby sawmill; until 2019 it was the only known example of this type of waste burner surviving in Michigan, and it was listed on the National Register of Historic Places in 2011. The burner collapsed in 2019, and was removed from the National Register in 2020.

== History ==
In 1881, George Farnsworth and his partners in Wisconsin's Oconto Lumber Company founded the Bay de Noquet (later Bay de Noc) Lumber Company. The company immediately built a sawmill in Nahma, along the northern coast of Lake Michigan, opening it in 1882. Fires were problematic, and the Nahma sawmill was destroyed by fire in 1889 and again in 1899. In response, the company built this wastewood burner, located on a small nearby island, to eliminate the sawmill waste. Although the exact construction date is not known, it was some time between 1888 and 1893; it is not unlikely that the burner was built after the 1889 fire. s

The sawmill was destroyed yet again in 1923. The company rebuilt, and continued to log the surrounding area and use the waste burner. However, available timber supplies were dwindling, and the mill shut down permanently in 1951.

The burner collapsed in the overnight hours of April 18, 2019.

== Description ==
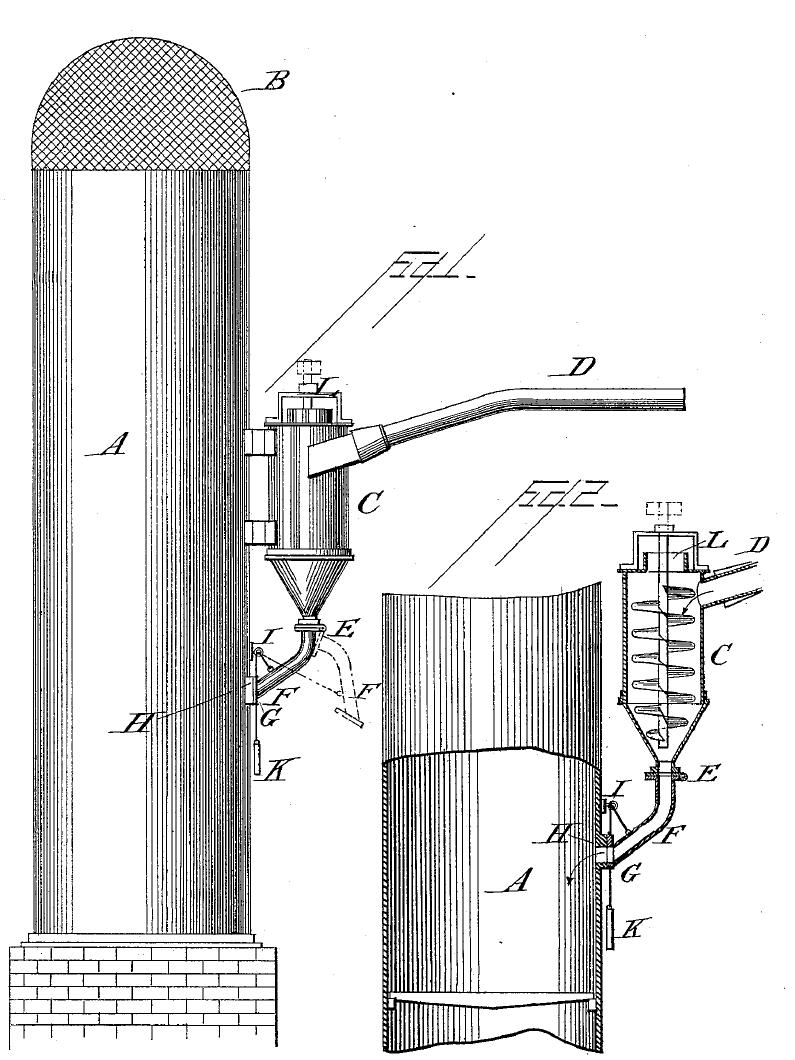
1888 Waste Burner Patent Drawing

The Bay de Noquet Lumber Company Waste Burner was a round tower, 32 feet (9.8 m) in diameter on the outside and approximately 100 feet (30 m) tall. It was constructed of cast iron plates lined with brick, and sat on a 6 feet (1.8 m) high limestone foundation. The exterior iron plates were rectangular, and were placed in horizontal rows with a slight overlap between adjacent plates. The lowest five rows had an additional strap to prevent the structure from bulging outward. The lowest row contained arched openings penetrating into the interior of the burner, apparently used to remove ashes. A larger opening about halfway up the structure was originally used to dump waste via a conveyor into the burner. A wire mesh dome, put in place to prevent embers from escaping, covered the top, and a weathervane inscribed with "B. de N. Co." was in place at the very top.

The interior brick was about 18 inches (460 mm) thick in the lower 30 feet (9.1 m) and about 8 inches (200 mm) thick in the next 24 feet (7.3 m). Above that level the burner was unlined. This construction was very similar to that found in the 1888 patent issued to Muskegon Boiler Works.

The burner was located on low ground near Lake Michigan, in a position that was at one time about 60 feet (18 m) east of the sawmill proper. However, all traces of the sawmill have been erased, save for wooden pilings along the shore and the waste burner itself. A golf course now occupies the former site of the mill.

== See also ==
- National Register of Historic Places listings in Delta County, Michigan
