= Nahma and Northern Railway Locomotive No. 5 =

Preserved American locomotive

Nahma and Northern Railway Locomotive #5
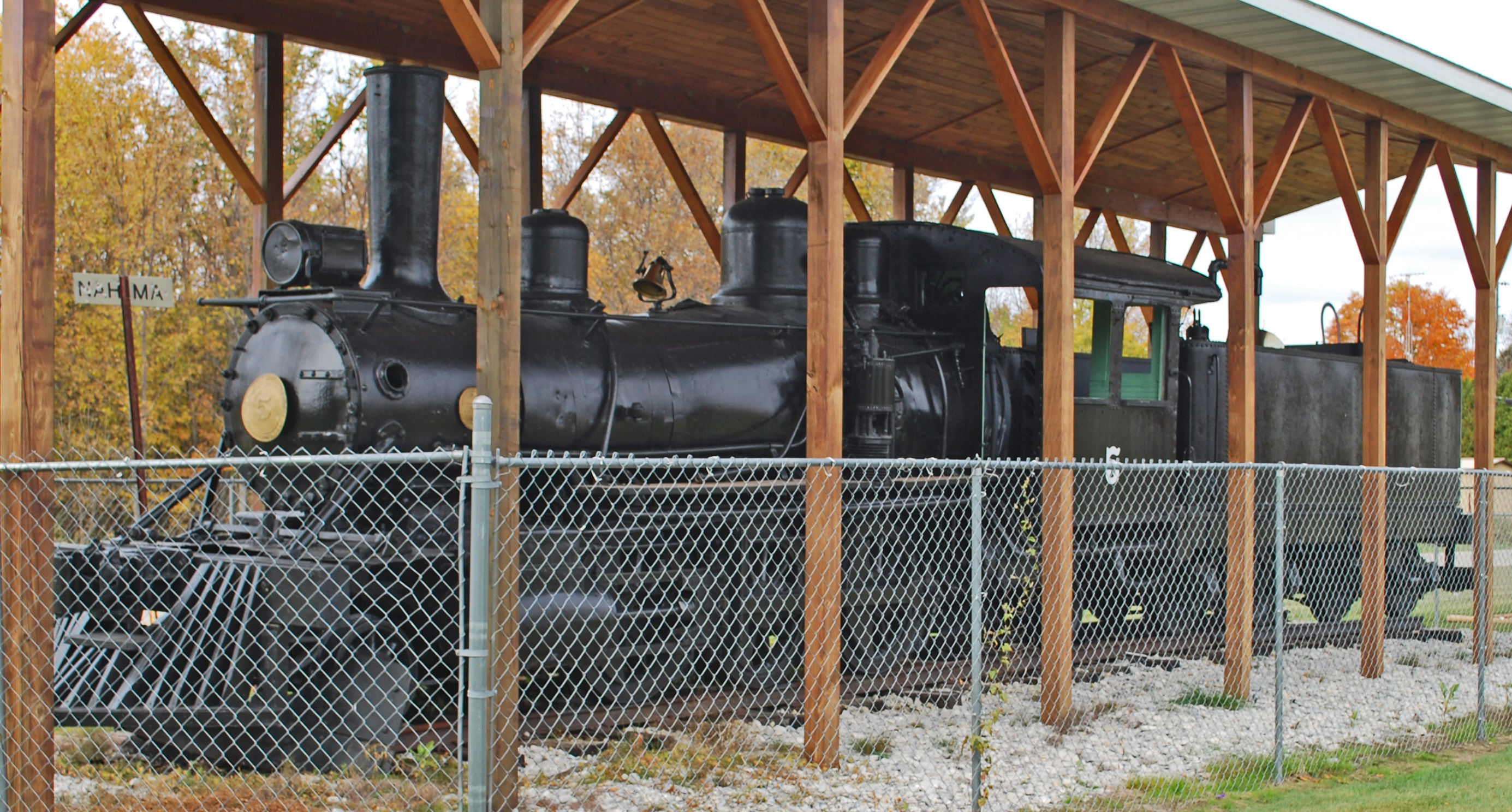
- Nahma and Northern Railway Locomotive #5 on display in 2010
Type and origin
- Power type: Steam
- Builder: Baldwin Locomotive Works
- Serial number: 38846
- Build date: 1912
Specifications
- Configuration
  - Whyte: 2-6-2
- Fuel type: Coal
- Cylinders: Two, outside
Career
- Disposition: On static display
- Nahma and Northern Railway Locomotive #5
- U.S. National Register of Historic Places
- Location within Michigan Location within the United States
- Interactive map
- Location: Main St. at River St., Nahma Township, Michigan
- Coordinates: 45°50′27″N 86°39′51″W
- Area: 0.9 acres (0.36 ha)
- Built: 1912
- Architect: Baldwin Locomotive Company
- NRHP reference No.: 06001327
- Added to NRHP: January 30, 2007

The Nahma and Northern Railway Locomotive #5 is a locomotive located at the corner of Main Street and River Street in Nahma Township, Michigan.

== History ==
The town of Nahma was established in 1881 by the Bay De Noquet Lumber Company as the base for its upper Michigan lumbering operations. The company began harvesting softwoods, but as the supply decreased, it was forced to turn to hardwood logging. In 1901, the Bay De Noquet Lumber Company began construction of a railroad system, the Nahma and Northern, leading from Nahma into the surrounding forest and various lumber camps. The railway eventually had 75 miles of track, The Nahma and Northern had seven locomotives, one caboose, and over 100 Russell Cars for hauling timber.

The railroad was abandoned in 1948. In 1951, the town of Nahma was sold to the American Playground Device Co. for development into a resort. The planned resort, however, never got off the ground.

== Description ==
This locomotive is a 2-6-2 coal-burning locomotive, built by the Baldwin Locomotive Works of Philadelphia in 1912.

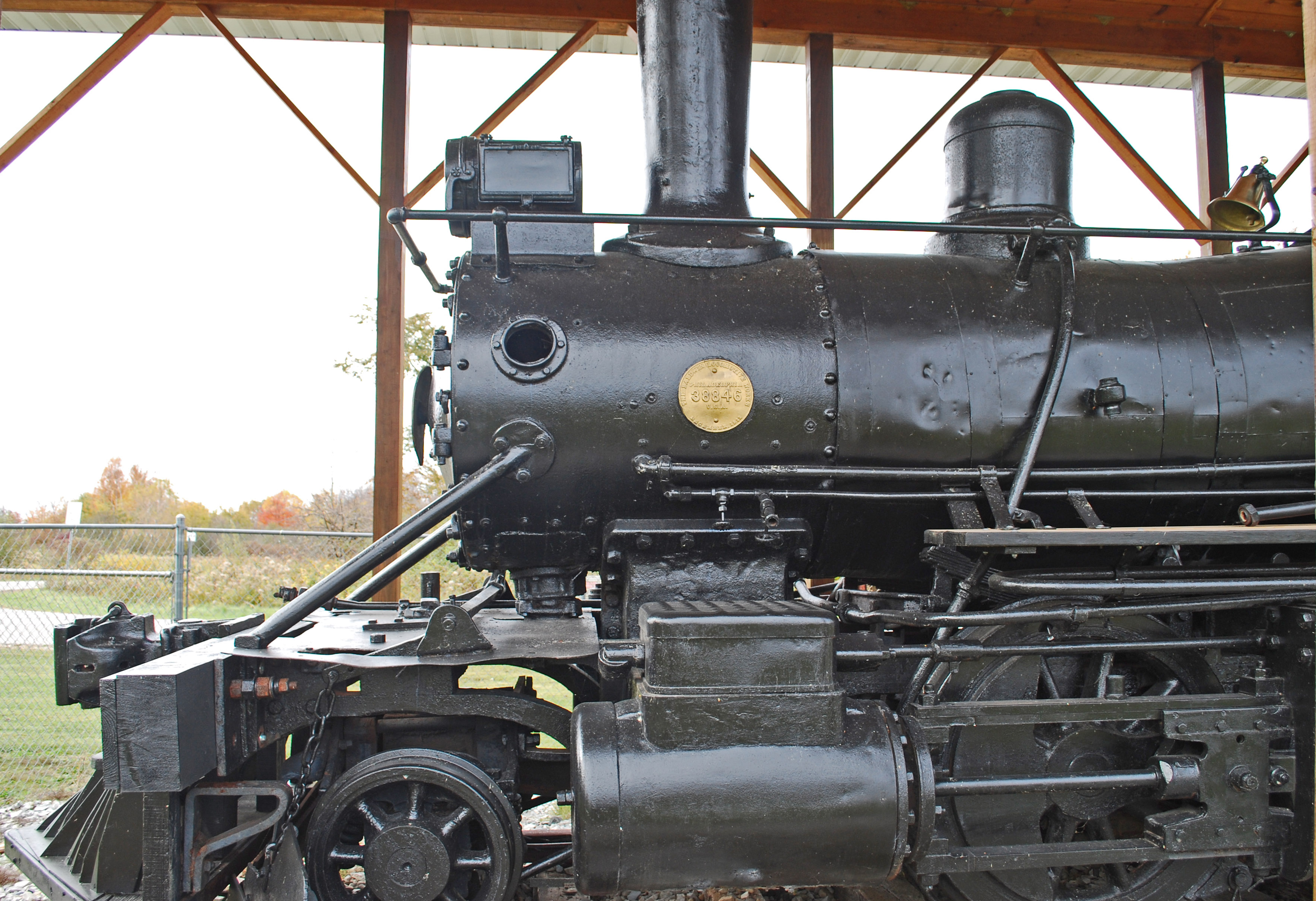
Boiler with numbered plaque

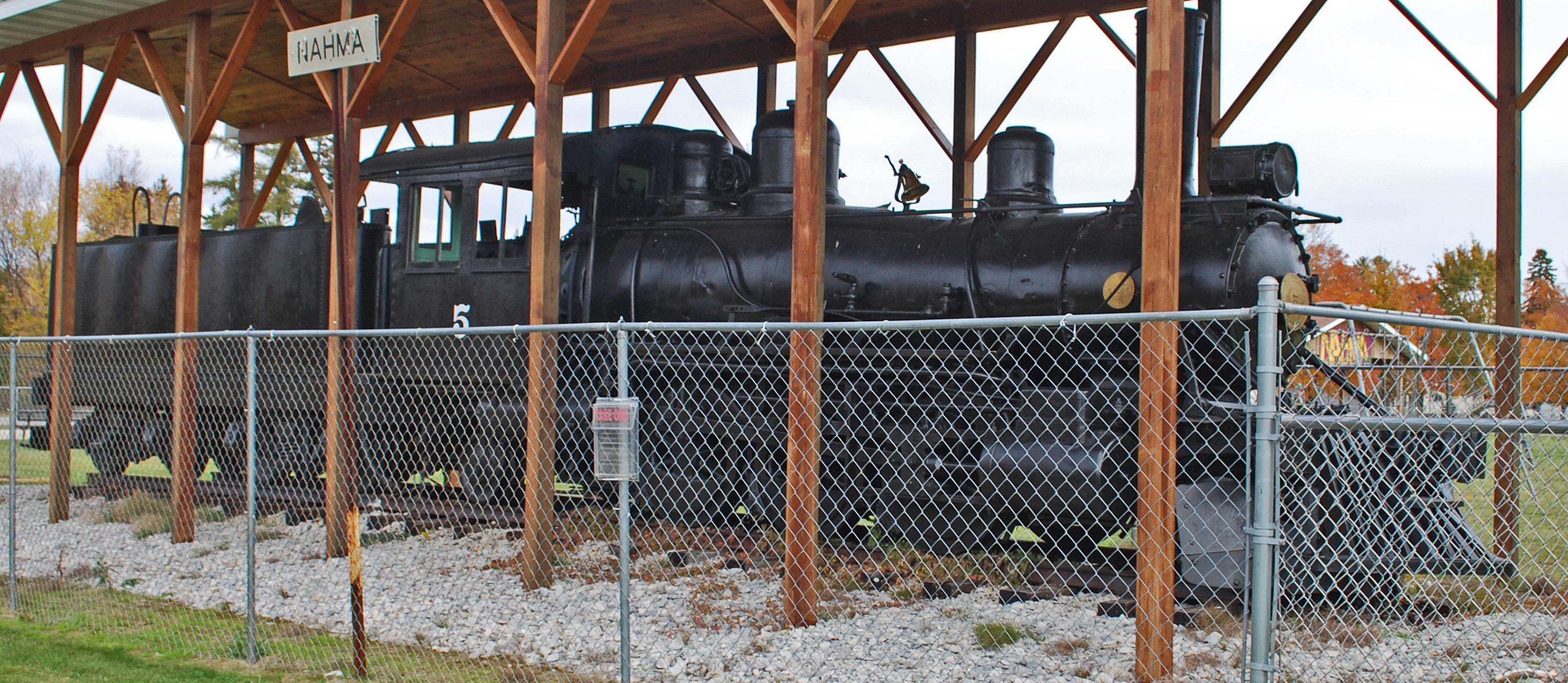
Opposite side

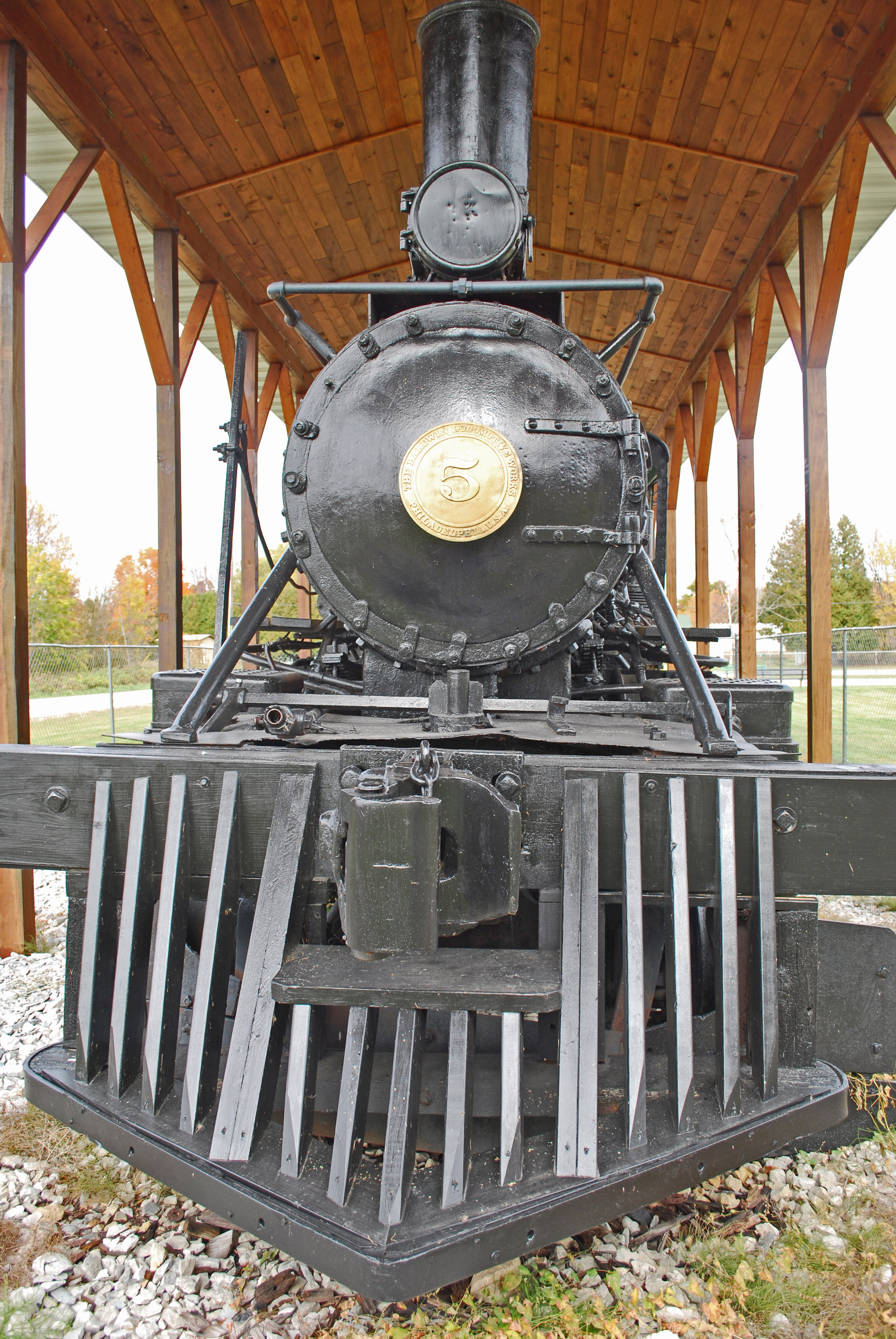
Front of locomotive

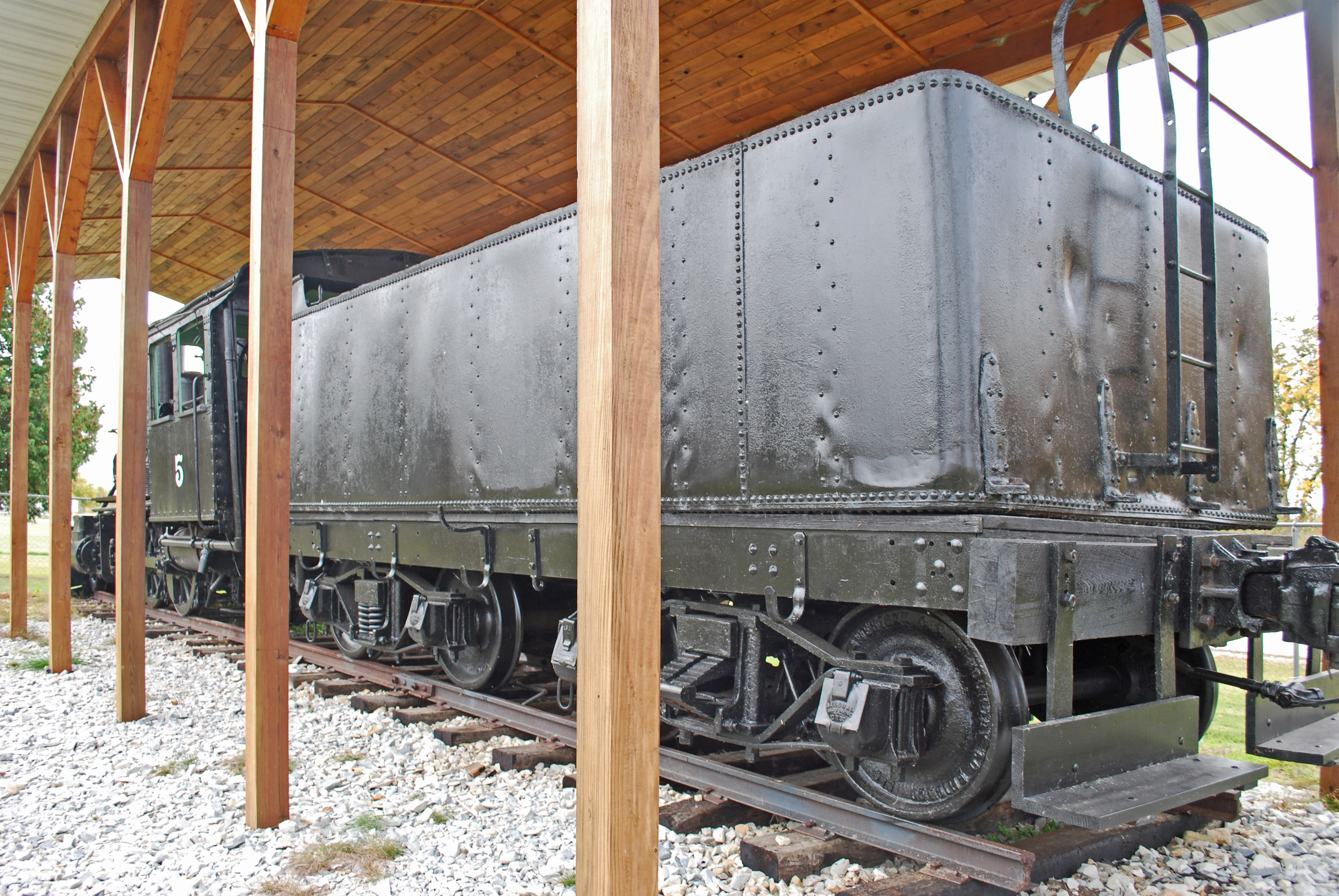
Rear view

== See also ==
- National Register of Historic Places listings in Delta County, Michigan
