= Menominee Pier Light =

Lighthouse in Michigan, United States

Pierhead Light 4
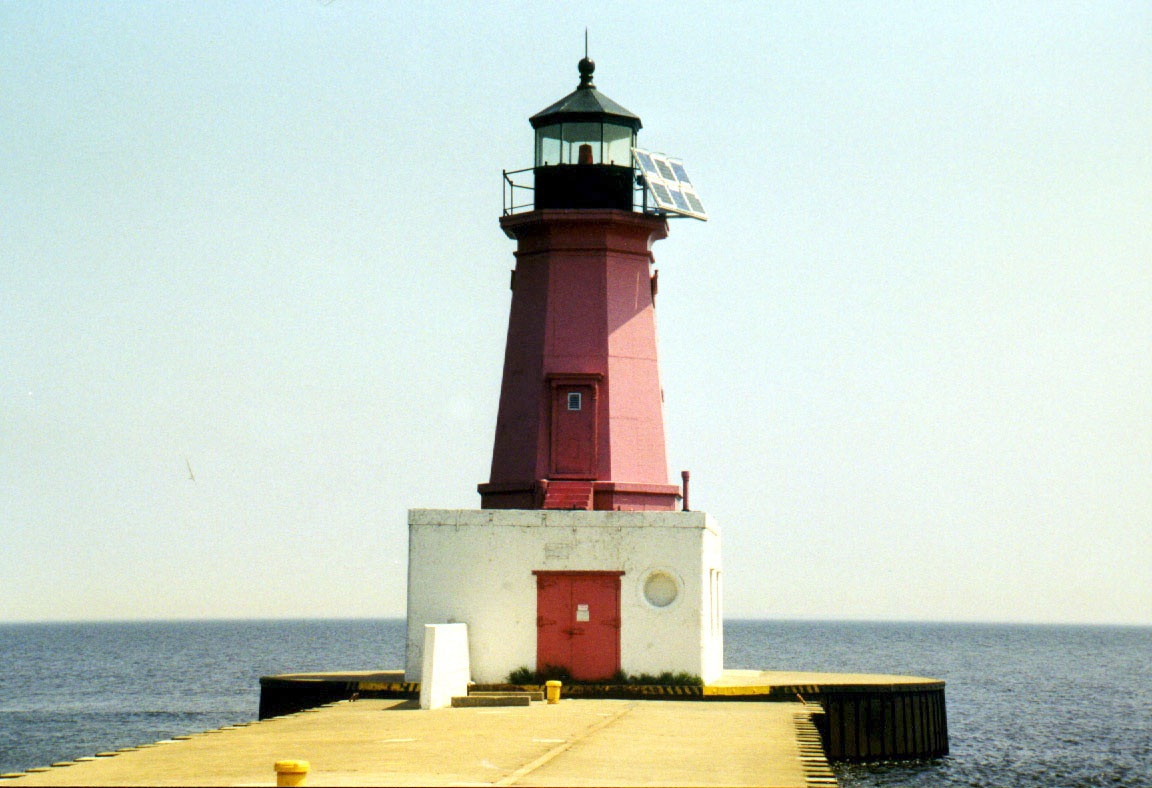
- Location: Menominee, Michigan
- Coordinates: 45°05′50.2″N 87°35′9.6″W

Tower
- Foundation: Concrete pier
- Construction: Cast iron
- Automated: 1972
- Height: 34 feet (10 m)
- Shape: Octagonal
- Markings: red Daymark with black lantern and white base
- Heritage: National Register of Historic Places listed place

Light
- First lit: 1927
- Focal height: 46 feet (14 m)
- Lens: Fourth Order Fresnel lens (original), 12-inch (300 mm) Tideland Signal ML-300 acrylic (current)
- Range: 9 nautical miles (17 km; 10 mi)
- Characteristic: Fl R 4s
- Menominee Pierhead Light Station
- U.S. National Register of Historic Places
- Nearest city: Menominee, Michigan
- Area: less than one acre
- Built: 1927
- Architect: US Lighthouse Board; US Lighthouse Service
- MPS: Light Stations of the United States MPS
- NRHP reference No.: 05000738
- Added to NRHP: July 27, 2005

The Menominee North Pier lighthouse is located in the harbor of Menominee, Michigan. The station was first lit in 1877. The current structure and its still operational light was lit in 1927, and automated in 1972. It is also sometimes called the "Menominee (Marinette) North Pierhead Light".

The foundation is a concrete pier. The 34-foot (10 m) tall octagonal cast iron building is marked in a distinctive red, with a black lantern and white base. A Fourth Order Fresnel lens was originally installed, but was replaced with a modern 12-inch (300 mm) acrylic optic lens. The original lens is now at Sand Point Light in Escanaba, Michigan. The focal plane is 46 feet (14 m).

The building originally had a diaphone fog signal structure attached, and it was later removed. The iron catwalk was removed in 1972 when the light was automated.

This light is paired with a large rear range light. That is denominated the Menominee (Marinette) North Pier light, and is also an active aid to navigation. Its focal plane 59 feet (18 m), and its characteristic is a continuous red light. The tower is a 50-foot (15 m)square pyramidal steel skeletal tower with gallery. It is painted red, and located on the Menominee North Pier about 600 feet (180 m) from the pierhead light. It may be accessed by walking the pier. The site is open, but the tower is closed. U.S. Coast Guard. USCG 7-21940.

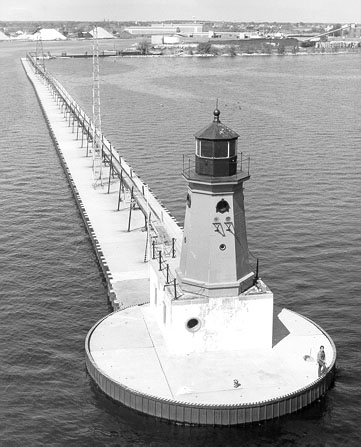
Undated USCG aerial photo, showing catwalk (since removed)

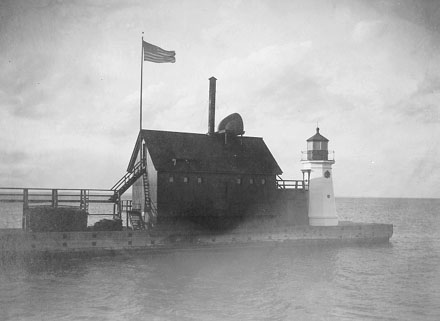
Early undated USCG image of light and attached fog signal building
