= Minneapolis Shoal Light Station =

Lighthouse in Michigan, United States

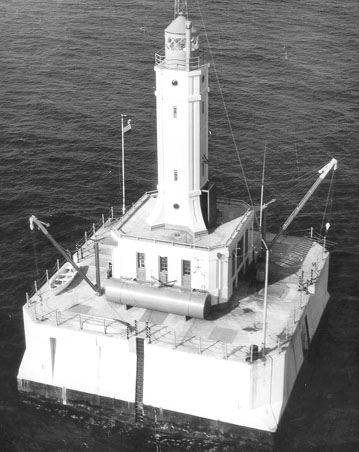
- Location: Northern Green Bay, 6.6 miles (10.6 km) south of Peninsula Point, near Big Bay de Noc, Michigan
- Coordinates: 45°32′10″N 86°59′54″W

Tower
- Constructed: 1934
- Foundation: Concrete pier on concrete crib
- Construction: Steel, reinforced concrete
- Automated: 1979
- Height: 70 feet (21 m)
- Shape: Octagonal
- Markings: Cream colored
- Heritage: National Register of Historic Places listed place

Light
- First lit: 1935
- Focal height: 25 m (82 ft)
- Lens: Fourth order Fresnel lens
- Characteristic: Fl W 5s
- Minneapolis Shoal Light Station
- U.S. National Register of Historic Places
- Area: 0.6 acres (0.24 ha)
- Architect: U.S. Lighthouse Service 12th Dist.; Office of Supt. of Lighthouses
- MPS: Light Stations of the United States MPS
- NRHP reference No.: 06001025
- Added to NRHP: November 15, 2006

The Minneapolis Shoal Light Station is a light house located in northern Green Bay, 6.6 miles (10.6 km) south of Peninsula Point near Big Bay de Noc, Michigan. It was listed on the National Register of Historic Places in 2006.

== History ==
Nineteenth century shipping traffic into Escanaba, Michigan went by way of Peninsula Point; to guide the traffic there, the Peninsula Point Light was established in 1856. However, by the 1930s, shipping traffic had shifted far south of the point, and in response funds were appropriated for the Minneapolis Shoal Light Station in 1932. Construction was completed in 1934, and the light was first lit in 1935. The station was later automated in 1979, and is still in use.

== Description ==
The Minneapolis Shoal Light Station is a cream colored octagonal tower, constructed of reinforced concrete, with an integral keeper's house. It is a twin of Grays Reef Light Station, built at approximately the same time. The design is a modification of one created by F. P. Dillon and W. G. Will, which was used in Conneaut, Ohio and Huron, Ohio.

The Light Station sits on a square reinforced concrete pier, 30 feet (9.1 m) high and 64 feet (20 m) on a side. Atop the pier is a two-story base, 15 feet (4.6 m) high and 30 feet (9.1 m) on a side. The cellar and first floor of the base was built to house diesel generators, boilers, and compressors to provide power and heat to the light, fog signal, and keeper's quarters. The second floor of the base housed the keeper's quarters. The lighthouse tower is placed in the center of the building roof. The tower is 17 feet (5.2 m) tall, and tapers from 16 feet (4.9 m) at the base to 10 feet (3.0 m) beneath the gallery. The entire light is covered on the exterior with steel plates.

== See also ==
- National Register of Historic Places listings in Delta County, Michigan
