= Gooseneck Lake III Site =

Archaeological site in Michigan, United States

- U.S. National Register of Historic Places
- Location within Michigan Location within the United States
- Location: Delta County, Michigan
- Coordinates: 46°4′20.5″N 86°32′43.4″W
- MPS: Woodland Period Archaeological Sites of the Indian River and Fishdam River Basins MPS
- NRHP reference No.: 14000369
- Added to NRHP: June 27, 2014

The Gooseneck Lake III Site, also designated 20DE43, is an archaeological site located in Delta County, Michigan. The site dates from the Woodland period and is located about 60 feet from the water. It was listed on the National Register of Historic Places in 2014.

== See also ==
- National Register of Historic Places listings in Delta County, Michigan
