= Camp Delta – Delta Resort =

- U.S. National Register of Historic Places
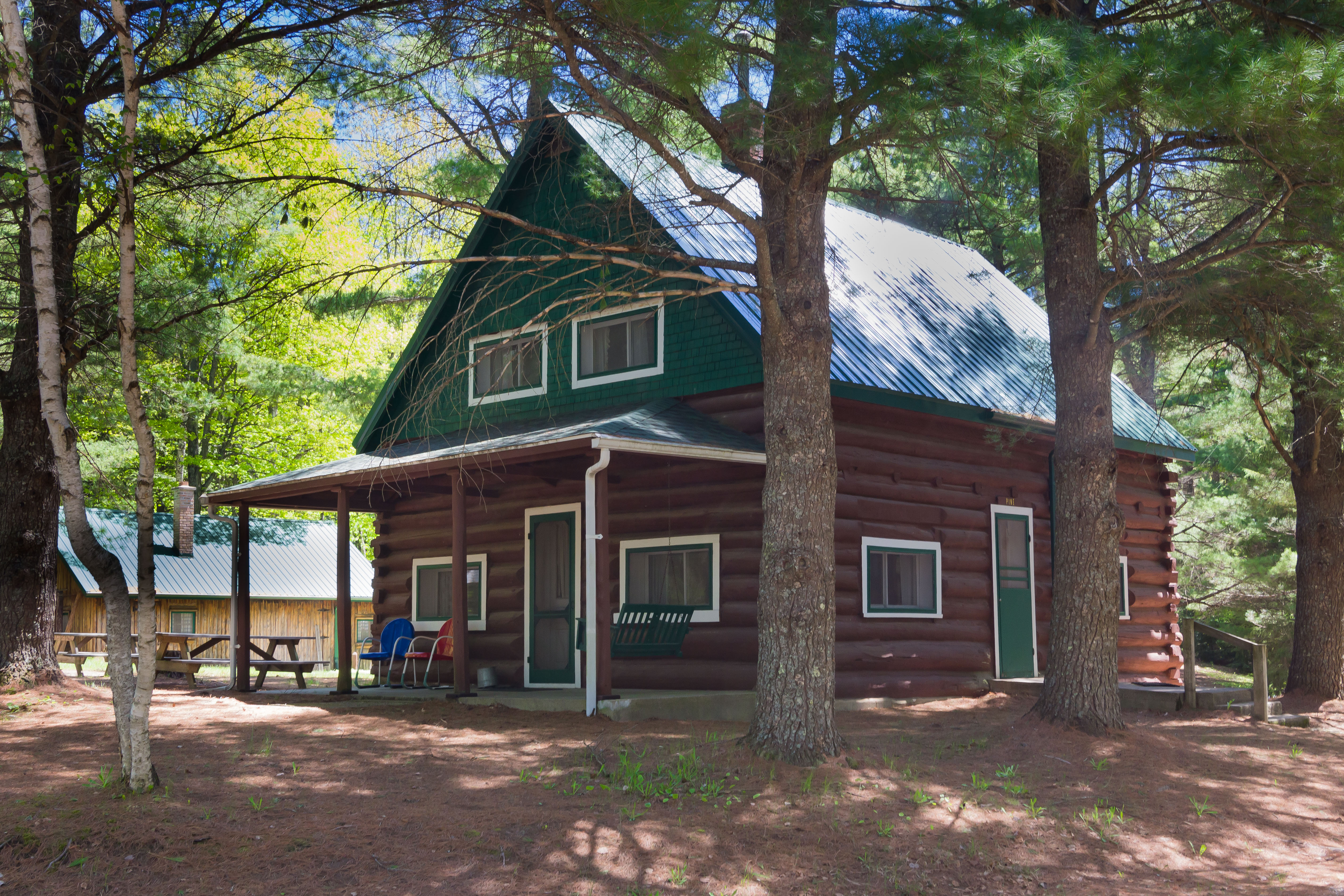

- Location within Michigan Location within the United States
- Interactive map
- Location: 17049 Foote Lake Rd. Garden Township, Michigan
- Coordinates: 46°9′27″N 86°29′28″W
- NRHP reference No.: 100000935
- Added to NRHP: May 1, 2017

Camp Delta, also known as the Delta Resort, is a resort located at 17049 Foote Lake Road in Garden Township, Michigan. It was listed on the National Register of Historic Places in 2017.

The resort is located on Foote Lake in the Hiawatha National Forest, and contains six cabins, as well as an office and workshop. It has been owned and operated by Ted and Louise Burson since 1963. The Bursons bought the resort in June 1963 and got married in August 1963; in July 2013 they celebrated 50th year anniversaries of both events at the resort with 37 relatives including children and grandchildren.

== Images ==
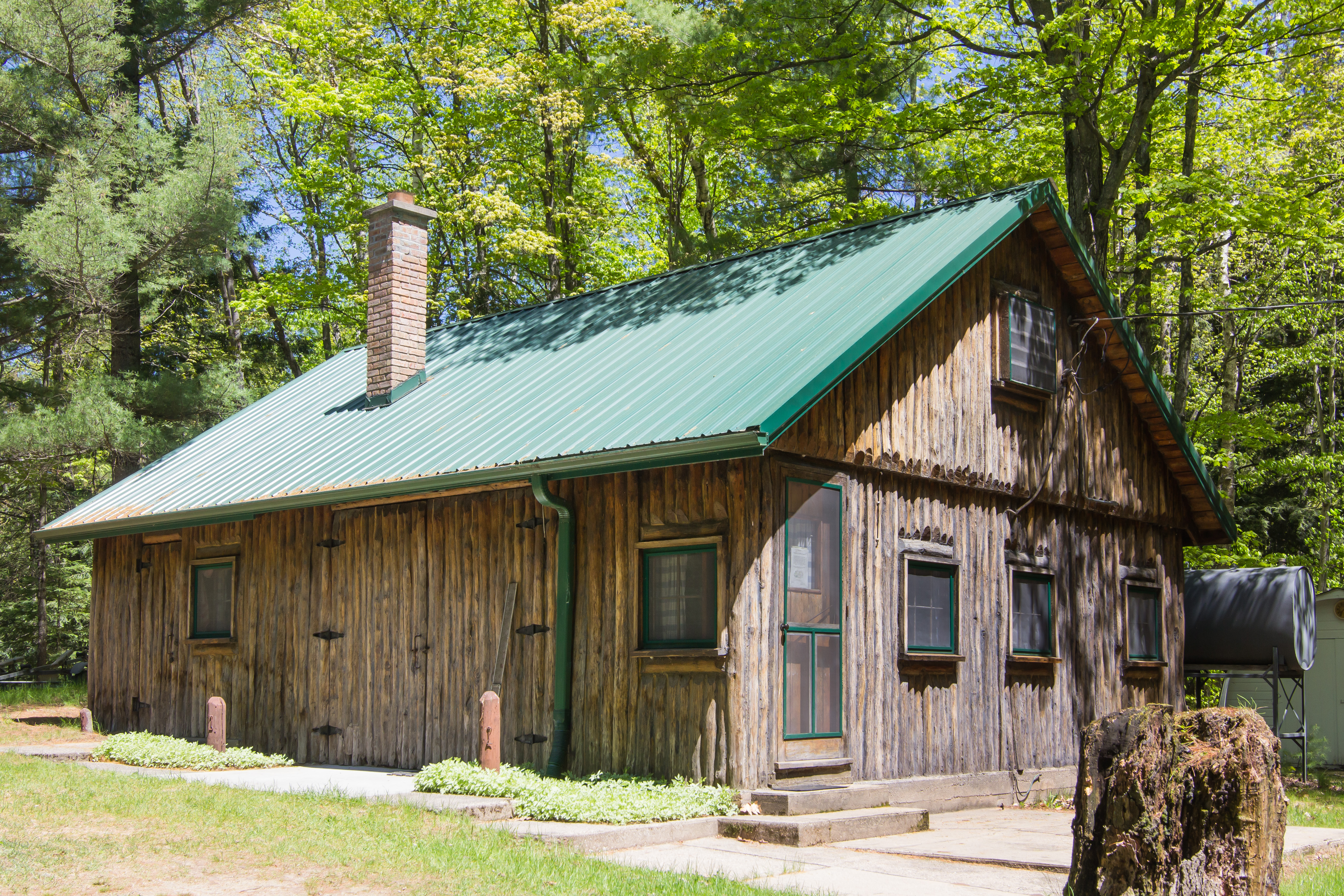

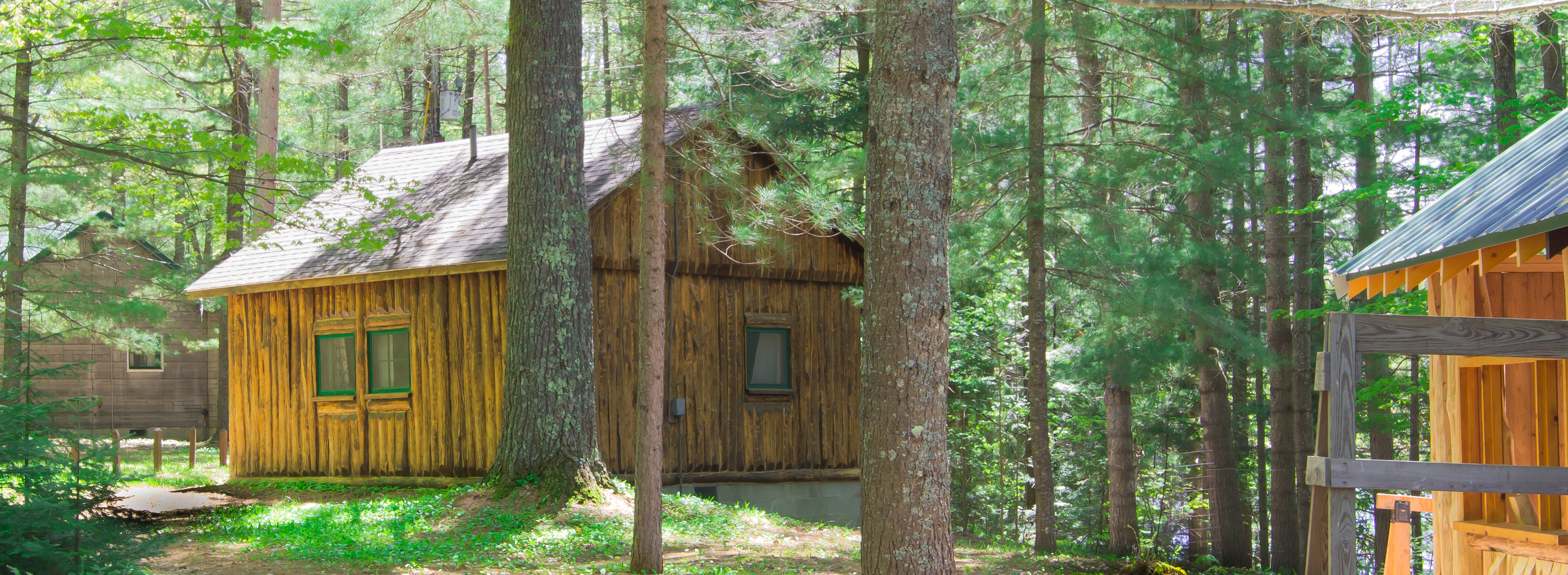

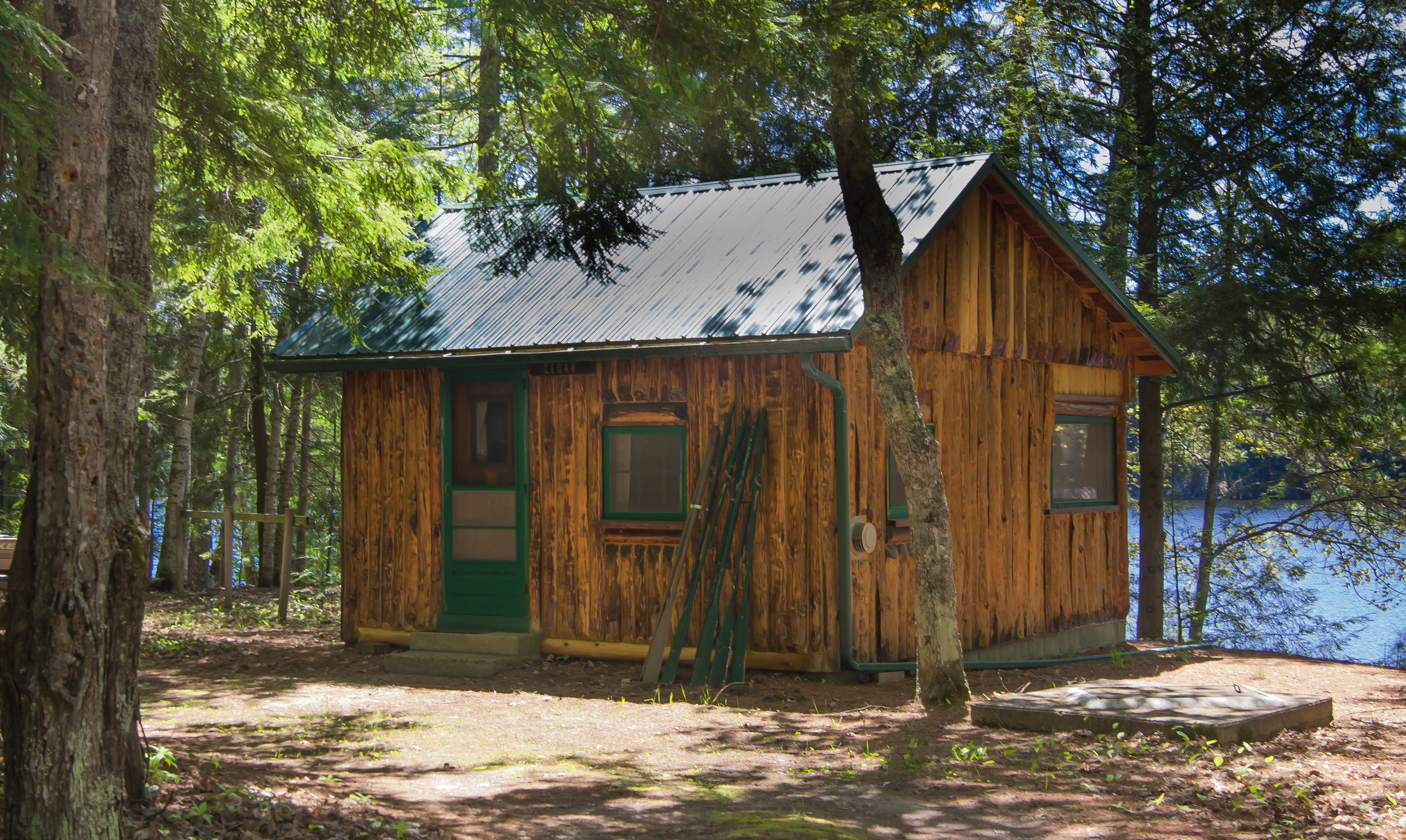

== See also ==
- National Register of Historic Places listings in Delta County, Michigan
