= Jackpine Lake Site =

Archaeological site in Michigan, United States

- U.S. National Register of Historic Places
- Location within Michigan Location within the United States
- Location: Delta County, Michigan
- Coordinates: 46°7′7.7″N 86°30′53.5″W
- MPS: Woodland Period Archaeological Sites of the Indian River and Fishdam River Basins MPS
- NRHP reference No.: 14000371
- Added to NRHP: June 27, 2014

The Jackpine Lake Site, also designated 20DE326, is an archaeological site located in Delta County, Michigan. The site dates from the Woodland period and is about 90 feet from the water. It is located near a stand of wild rice. It was listed on the National Register of Historic Places in 2014.

== See also ==
- National Register of Historic Places listings in Delta County, Michigan
