= Gooseneck Lake IV Site =

Archaeological site in Michigan, United States

- U.S. National Register of Historic Places
- Location within Michigan Location within the United States
- Location: Delta County, Michigan
- Coordinates: 46°4′20.5″N 86°32′43.4″W
- MPS: Woodland Period Archaeological Sites of the Indian River and Fishdam River Basins MPS
- NRHP reference No.: 14000370
- Added to NRHP: June 27, 2014

The Gooseneck Lake IV Site, also designated 20DE44, is an archaeological site located in Delta County, Michigan. The site dates from the Woodland period. It was listed on the National Register of Historic Places in 2014.

== See also ==
- National Register of Historic Places listings in Delta County, Michigan
