= Winter Site =

Archaeological site in Michigan, United States

- U.S. National Register of Historic Places
- Location within Michigan Location within the United States
- Location: On a small tributary of Big Bay de Noc near Garden, Michigan
- Coordinates: 45°50′0″N 86°32′0″W
- Area: 0 acres (0 ha)
- NRHP reference No.: 76001027
- Added to NRHP: May 19, 1976

The Winter Site is an archaeological site located along Big Bay de Noc north of Garden, Michigan. It was listed on the National Register of Historic Places in 1976.

The site is located about 1,000 feet (300 m) inland from the water along a small tributary. The site was occupied at a time when the Lake Michigan shoreline extended further inland than it does today. It was excavated by researchers from Western Michigan University in the mid-1970s.

The site was populated by Middle Woodland period peoples at two distinct times: one earlier occupation of relatively short duration (1 to 2 seasons) and a later occupation that lasted longer. The occupation was interrupted by what was likely a short rise in lake level or a heavy seasonal flood. Remains at the site indicate that the inhabitants subsisted on fall-spawning fish, and therefore the site represents an early experimentation in coastal living in the late fall and winter.

== See also ==
- National Register of Historic Places listings in Delta County, Michigan
