= Poverty Island Light Station =

Lighthouse in Lake Michigan, United States

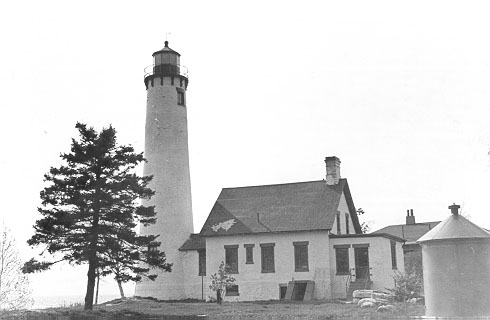
- Location: On Poverty Island in NW Lake Michigan, 5.8 miles (9.3 km) south of the Garden Peninsula
- Coordinates: 45°31′38″N 86°39′49″W

Tower
- Constructed: 1875
- Foundation: dressed stone
- Construction: brick
- Automated: 1957
- Height: 65 feet (20 m)
- Shape: conical
- Markings: white
- Heritage: National Register of Historic Places listed place

Light
- First lit: 1875
- Deactivated: 1976
- Focal height: 78 feet (24 m)
- Lens: fourth order Fresnel lens
- Range: 14 nautical miles; 26 kilometres (16 mi)
- Poverty Island Light Station
- U.S. National Register of Historic Places
- Area: 171.2 acres (69.3 ha)
- Built by: U.S. Lighthouse Board; U.S. Lighthouse Service
- MPS: Light Stations of the United States MPS
- NRHP reference No.: 05000984
- Added to NRHP: September 6, 2005

The Poverty Island Light is a light house located on Poverty Island in northwestern Lake Michigan, 5.8 miles (9.3 km) south of Garden Peninsula. It was listed on the National Register of Historic Places in 2005 as the Poverty Island Light Station.

== History ==
In 1864, the railroad connection between Escanaba and Negaunee was completed, allowing iron ore to be easily transported to the southern shore of the Upper Peninsula. Shipping traffic into Escanaba immediately increased, which also increased the traffic through the relatively narrow Poverty Island Passage near the southern shore of Poverty island. The Poverty Island Passage was hazardous to traverse after dark, so in 1867 the Lighthouse Board requested funds to build a lighthouse on the southern tip of Poverty Island. However, Congress did not appropriate funds, some $18,000, until 1873.

Work on the light began the same year; however a late season fire destroyed some of the building material stored near the partially completed lighthouse. Work continued in 1874, but the tower was only partially completed before funds ran out. A temporary light was installed. After an additional $3,000 was appropriated, the light station was completed in 1875. The permanent light, with its fourth order Fresnel lens, was finally lit on August 10, 1875.

In 1885, a fog signal station was constructed nearby. In 1894, an iron oil house and docks were constructed. The light was automated in 1957 and the buildings abandoned. The light was deactivated in 1976 after another light was installed in a skeletal steel tower nearby. The cast iron lantern was removed from the tower and discarded nearby along with other lighthouse equipment. In the 1980s the lantern was rescued by the Delta County Historical Society, who used it to refurbish the Sand Point Light in Escanaba. The lighthouse remains abandoned, and in 2011 was declared by Lighthouse Digest to be "America’s Most Endangered Lighthouse."

== Description ==
The Poverty Island Light was designed to be a near duplicate of the Sturgeon Point Light. The tower is 70 feet (21 m) high, with the light installed in a cast-iron lantern at 65 feet (20 m) above the ground. A wood frame and brick keeper's quarters is attached.

== See also ==
- National Register of Historic Places listings in Delta County, Michigan
