= Peninsula Point Light =

Lighthouse in Michigan, United States

Peninsula Point Lighthouse
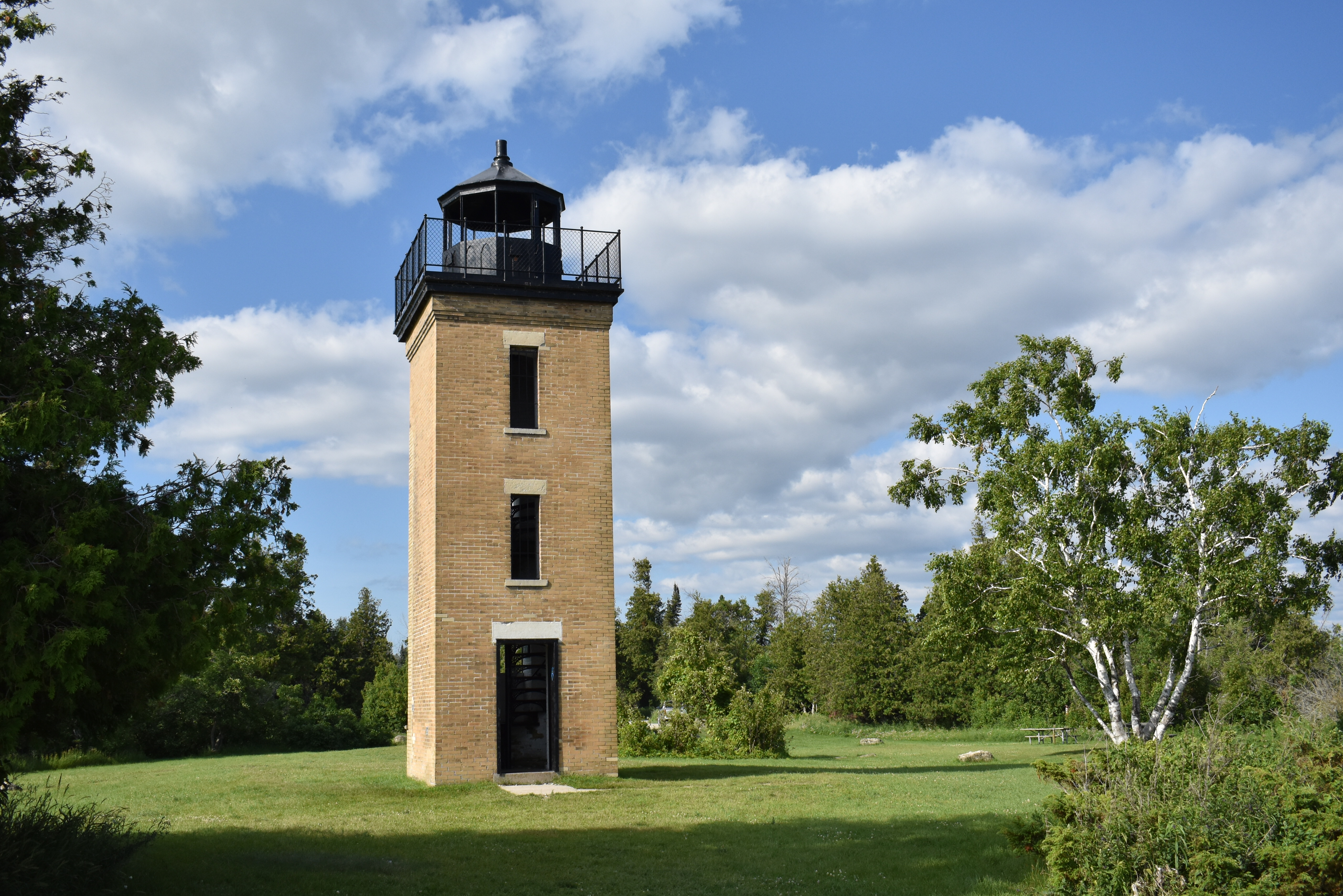
- Peninsula Point Light in July 2026
- Location: Stonington, Michigan
- Coordinates: 45.6682°N 86.9666°W

Tower
- Constructed: 1865
- Foundation: Natural emplaced
- Construction: Brick
- Automated: 1922
- Height: 40 feet (12 m)
- Shape: Square, decagonal lantern
- Markings: Natural yellow with black parapet and lantern
- Heritage: National Register of Historic Places listed place

Light
- First lit: 1866
- Deactivated: 1936
- Focal height: 40 feet (12 m)
- Lens: Oil lamp (original), 4th order Fresnel lens (later)
- Range: 10 nautical miles; 19 kilometres (12 mi)
- Characteristic: white flash every 30 seconds.
- Peninsula Point Lighthouse
- U.S. National Register of Historic Places
- Michigan State Historic Site
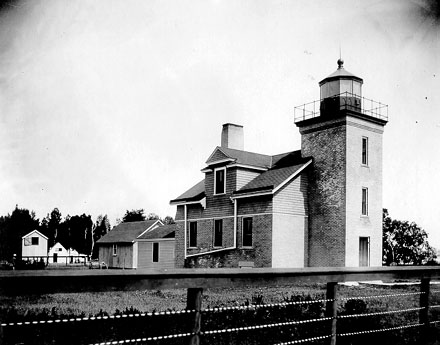
- U.S. Coast Guard Archive Photo
- Nearest city: Escanaba, Michigan
- Area: less than one acre
- NRHP reference No.: 75000941
- Added to NRHP: April 28, 1975

The Peninsula Point Light is a lighthouse located at the southern tip of the Stonington Peninsula in Bay de Noc township in Delta County, Michigan. United States Coast Guard historical documents have over the years listed the name of the site as both Peninsula Point and Point Peninsula.

== Service ==
The Stonington Peninsula juts into Lake Michigan from the southern coast of Michigan's Upper Peninsula at a key point along the shipping lanes to and from the docks of Escanaba and Gladstone, as a hazardous shoal extends more than 2 miles (3.2 km) out into the lake, posing a hazard to shipping. Thus the light had two purposes: (1) it marked a turning point; and (2) it warned mariners away from the rocks and shallows. Danger was inherent in the confluence of reefs and the shipping channels, through which fish, iron ore, lumber, along with other products were transported. "The U.S. Government recognized the need for a lighthouse on the peninsula to aid navigation around these dangerous shoals and reefs separating Big Bay de Noc, Little Bay de Noc, and Green Bay of Lake Michigan."

Although Congress voted funds to build the lighthouse founded in 1856, funds were again appropriated for the building of a lighthouse on the Stonington Peninsula on July 20, 1864. It was not built until 1865 following the United States Civil War. It maintained as an active aid to navigation until 1934.

Point Peninsula Light's first keeper was Mr. Charles Beggs, who died there in 1887. The second keeper was Mr. Henry Corgan. Mr. Peter Knutsen was third. In 1889 Captain James D. Armstrong was appointed keeper and this was home to him and his family until 1922.

In 1922, the United States Lighthouse Service installed an automatic acetylene light to replace the hand-operated oil lamp. Thus, it was no longer necessary to occupy the site since the light was automated. Captain Armstrong continued to be responsible for Peninsula Point until 1931.

Thereafter, the fourth-order lens was removed from the lantern and replaced by a 12-inch (300 mm) lens equipped with a 300-candlepower acetylene flasher Dalén light and sun valve. Upon this installation, the light's characteristic was changed to repeated 1-second flash followed by a nine-second eclipse, exhibited initially on the evening of May 20, 1922.

When the Minneapolis Shoal Light Station went into service. this light was decommissioned and abandoned in 1936. In 1937, the USDA-Forest Service was granted custodianship. The building was repaired and public picnic grounds were constructed by the Civilian Conservation Corps. The Stonington Grange took over maintenance of the structure and grounds. In 1949 the Grange won first prize in their State contest for their work at the lighthouse.

The house portion burned to the ground in 1959. Debris was cleared and damage to the north side of the tower repaired in 1962 by the USDA Forest Service. Its tower is open for visitors to climb into the cast iron lantern room at the top of a cast-iron spiral staircase.

== Current status ==
The light is listed on the National Register of Historical Places, Reference #75000941, Name of Listing: PENINSULA POINT LIGHTHOUSE. It is not listed on the state registry.

The lighthouse tower is managed by the National Forest Service, which maintains a webpage for the light and picnic area.

== Bird and butterfly migrations ==
Because of their placement on points of land, lighthouses are often situated on migratory pathways, and are so-called 'bird traps.' See Whitefish Point Light and Tawas Point Light.

The Stonington Peninsula plays a crucial role in the migration of monarch butterflies, which gather there in September before migrating across Lake Michigan to Door County, Wisconsin. In the fall, thousands of monarch butterflies converge on the area to rest before their migration across Green Bay. It has been called the Point Pelee of the Upper Peninsula, and is an important bird area. The location is also an important location for migratory birds, and has been deemed to be a successful effort by the Hiawatha National Forest.

The area is said to be a rock hound's paradise. "The rocky shoreline yields fossils estimated at 400-500 million years old."

== Getting there ==
The USDA Forest Service operates the grounds as a picnic area. There are ten tables and grills on the lawns surrounding the tower. Pit toilets are available, as well as drinking water.

The light tower is located at the end of County Road 513 from US 2, about 3 miles (4.8 km) east of Rapid River, Michigan. The road that "progressively gets narrower and rougher, but the climb up the spiral staircase and the view from the ten-sided tower (which is open to the public), and "is worth the trip." The view is said to be "spectacular" so "Be sure to bring you camera." The road's last mile is "not recommended for recreational vehicles or trailers over 16 feet (4.9 m) long or 8 feet (2.4 m) high." A parking area for RV's is available at the beginning of the narrowing road.

== See also ==
- National Register of Historic Places listings in Delta County, Michigan
- Lighthouses in the United States
