= St. Martin Island Light =

Lighthouse in Michigan, United States

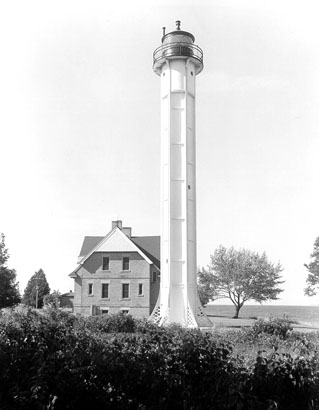
- St. Martin Island Light USCG Archive
- Location: St. Martin Island Lake Michigan
- Coordinates: 45°30′10″N 86°45′27″W

Tower
- Constructed: 1905
- Foundation: Granite
- Construction: Steel exoskeleton
- Height: 75 ft (23 m)
- Markings: white with black lantern
- Heritage: National Register of Historic Places listed place, Michigan State Historic Site

Light
- First lit: 1905
- Focal height: 81 feet (25 m)
- Lens: occulting 4th Order Fresnel illuminated by a 24,000 candlepower incandescent oil vapor lamp. Rotating red and white flash panels. (original), 7.5-inch (190 mm) Tideland Signal acrylic lens (current)
- Range: 18 nautical miles (33 km; 21 mi)
- Characteristic: Al W R 10s: W fl 5s ec.; R fl 5s ec. Light visible from 135° to 355°, dark sector covering island.
- St. Martin Island Light Station
- U.S. National Register of Historic Places
- Michigan State Historic Site
- Nearest city: Fairport, Michigan
- Area: 2 acres (0.81 ha)
- MPS: U.S. Coast Guard Lighthouses and Light Stations on the Great Lakes TR
- NRHP reference No.: 84001387
- Added to NRHP: July 19, 1984

St. Martin Island Light is an exoskeleton lighthouse on St. Martin Island. It marks one of four passages between Lake Michigan and the bay of Green Bay. Constructed in 1905, this light tower is the only example in the US of a pure exoskeletal tower on the Great Lakes. Similar designs exist in Canada. Painted white, the hexagonal tower is made of iron plates which are supported by six exterior steel posts that have latticed buttresses.

The cream city brick lightkeeper's house was modeled after that used for the Plum Island Range Lights.

It was listed on the National Register of Historic Places on July 19, 1984, Reference #84001387 as St. Martin Light Station (U.S. Coast Guard/ Great Lakes TR). It is not on the state list/inventory. A steam fog signal was also installed. which was thereafter replaced by a diaphone.

The lighthouse keeper's dwelling has been abandoned and "is in poor condition."

The light station is closed to the public. It is managed by in partnership with the Little Traverse Bay Band of the Odawa Indian Nation.

== See also ==
- National Register of Historic Places listings in Delta County, Michigan
