= St. Martin Island =

Island in Lake Michigan

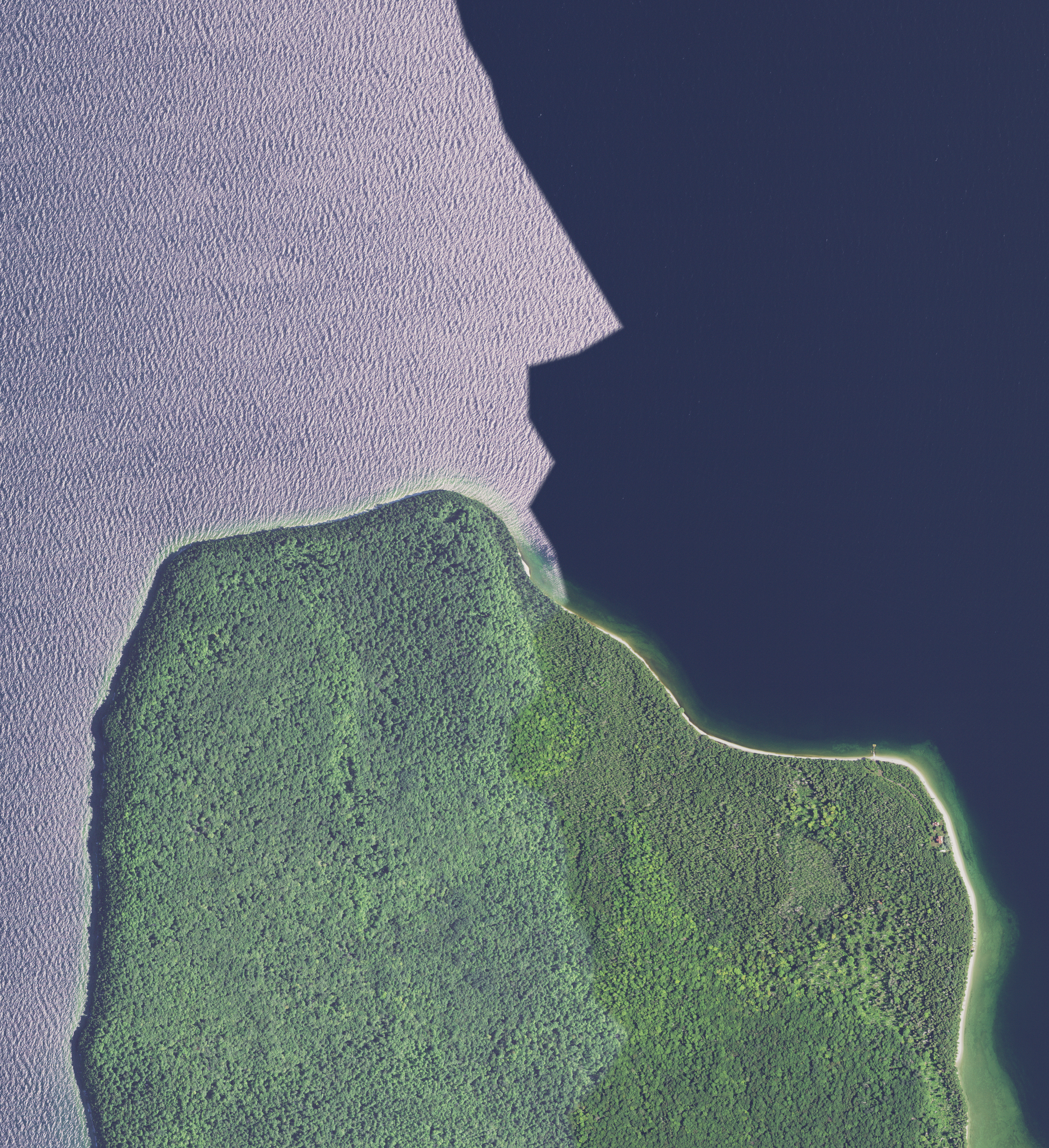
- Northern side Southern side Aerial photos of the island from late July 2020

- Location within Michigan Location within the United States

Geography
- Location: Lake Michigan
- Coordinates: 45°29′52″N 86°46′13″W
- Highest elevation: 643 ft (196 m)

Administration
- United States
- State: Michigan
- County: Delta County
- Township: Fairbanks Township

St. Martin Island is located off the Garden Peninsula in Delta County in the U.S. state of Michigan. It is the southernmost island in Michigan that is part of a line of islands at the mouth of the bay of Green Bay and is part of the Niagara Escarpment.

== Geography ==
Gravelly Island, Gull Island, and Little Gull Island are approximately two miles to the north and east across the St. Martin Island Passage. Rock Island in Wisconsin is approximately six miles south-southwest, across the Rock Island Passage. It is 18 miles (29 km) from the Door County Peninsula.

== History ==
In 1864 the Peninsula Railroad was completed to connect Escanaba, Michigan to Negaunee iron mines. Escanaba's maritime commerce "exploded as vessels loaded with ore left the growing port headed for the hungry steel mills along the shores of the eastern lakes." The island and the surrounding reefs are a hazard to navigation, and as early as 1891, the United States Lighthouse Board asked Congress for appropriations to build a light there.

The request for a lighthouse was necessitated by the existence of a shoal that extends out for a mile each way from the island. It took the U.S. Congress eight years to appropriate the funds. St. Martin Island Light was constructed in 1905.

Robert W. Warner of Sturgeon Bay, Wisconsin was the first pilot to land on St. Martin Island in the early 1950s. To this day, no one else has traveled to the island by air.

The Fred Luber family bought roughly 94% of the island (1,244 acres) in the 1980s, intending to build a resort. The remote location made development difficult and the island was left unimproved. The Nature Conservancy bought the island in 2013, intending to donate it to the Green Bay National Wildlife Refuge as it is an important bird stopover point. St. Martin Island and the lighthouse are off limits to the public.

== Note ==
"St. Martin Island" may also refer to islands in Mackinac County, Michigan. There is the St. Martin Island at 45°57′42″N 84°34′19″W, which along with Little Saint Martin Island at 45°56′47″N 84°33′53″W and Big St. Martin Island at 45°58′06″N 84°37′41″W form the St. Martin Islands group in the St. Martin Bay.

== In popular culture ==
The 1982 Canadian slasher film Humongous is set on St. Martin Island.
