= Bay de Noc Township, Michigan =

- Civil township
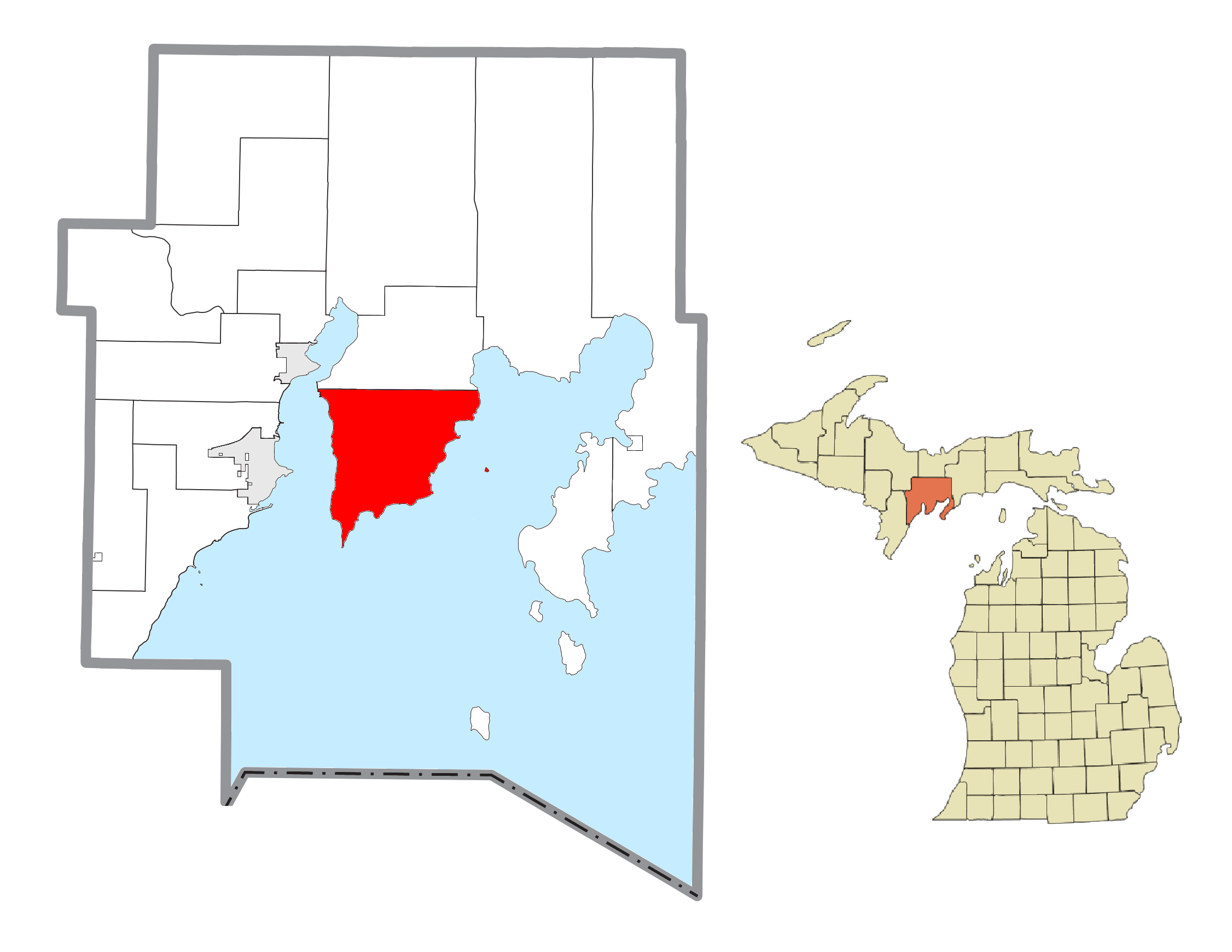
- Location within Delta County

- Location within the state of Michigan Bay de Noc Township (the United States)
- Coordinates: 45°46′13″N 86°55′11″W
- Country: United States
- State: Michigan
- County: Delta

Government
  - Supervisor: Ginny Dahlin

Area
  - Total: 91.0 sq mi (235.8 km^{2})
  - Land: 67.5 sq mi (174.8 km^{2})
  - Water: 23.6 sq mi (61.1 km^{2})
- Elevation: 640 ft (195 m)

Population (2020)
  - Total: 300
  - Density: 4.4/sq mi (1.7/km^{2})
- Time zone: UTC-5 (Eastern (EST))
  - Summer (DST): UTC-4 (EDT)
- ZIP code(s): 49878
- Area code: 906
- FIPS code: 26-06040
- GNIS feature ID: 1625893

Bay de Noc Township is a civil township of Delta County in the U.S. state of Michigan. As of the 2020 census, the township population was 300, slightly down from 305 at the 2010 census. The township covers the southern portion of the Stonington Peninsula separating Little Bay de Noc and Big Bay de Noc on Lake Michigan. The name is derived from the Noquet Indians.

Ensign Township is to the north and Escanaba is to the west across the Little Bay de Noc.

== Communities ==
- Stonington is an unincorporated community near the southern end of the peninsula at 45°43′23″N 86°58′35″W. Stonington is the site of the 40 ft (12 m) Peninsula Point Lighthouse.

== Geography ==
According to the United States Census Bureau, the township has a total area of 91.1 square miles (236 km^{2}), of which 67.5 square miles (175 km^{2}) is land and 23.6 square miles (61 km^{2}) (25.88%) is water.

== Demographics ==
As of the census of 2000, there were 329 people, 153 households, and 104 families residing in the township. The population density was 4.9 inhabitants per square mile (1.9/km^{2}). There were 528 housing units at an average density of 7.8 per square mile (3.0/km^{2}). The racial makeup of the township was 96.96% White, 0.61% Native American, and 2.43% from two or more races.

There were 153 households, out of which 15.0% had children under the age of 18 living with them, 64.1% were married couples living together, 2.6% had a female householder with no husband present, and 31.4% were non-families. 25.5% of all households were made up of individuals, and 9.2% had someone living alone who was 65 years of age or older. The average household size was 2.15 and the average family size was 2.56.

In the township the population was spread out, with 13.4% under the age of 18, 4.9% from 18 to 24, 19.1% from 25 to 44, 38.6% from 45 to 64, and 24.0% who were 65 years of age or older. The median age was 51 years. For every 100 females, there were 113.6 males. For every 100 females age 18 and over, there were 112.7 males.

The median income for a household in the township was $33,571, and the median income for a family was $43,250. Males had a median income of $43,750 versus $30,250 for females. The per capita income for the township was $24,472. About 1.7% of families and 7.0% of the population were below the poverty line, including 8.2% of those under age 18 and 10.6% of those age 65 or over.

Fire Coverage is provided by the Masonville Township Fire Department due to a paid contract between Masonville and Bay De Noc townships. EMS coverage is provided by Masonville EMS.
