= Sand Point Light =

Lighthouse in Michigan, United States

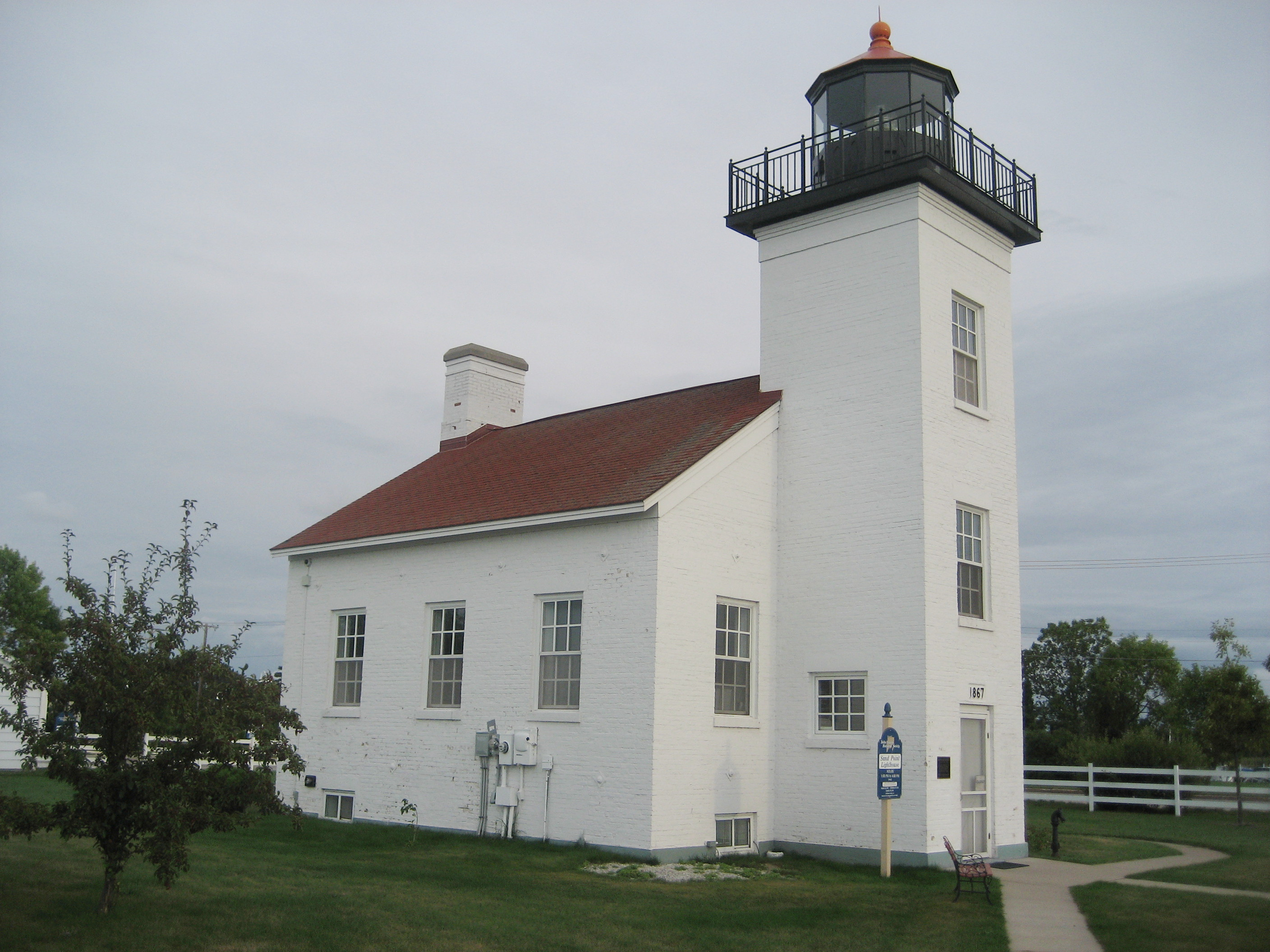
- Location: Escanaba, Delta County Michigan
- Coordinates: 45°45′N 87°02′W

Tower
- Constructed: 1867
- Foundation: natural/emplaced
- Construction: brick
- Height: 44 feet (13 m)
- Shape: square tower with octagonal lantern
- Markings: white w black parapet & lantern, red roofs
- Heritage: National Register of Historic Places listed place, Michigan State Historic Site

Light
- First lit: 1868
- Deactivated: 1939
- Focal height: 44 feet (13 m)
- Lens: Fourth order Fresnel Lens
- Range: 13 miles (21 km)
- Characteristic: white light, 3 s on, 3 s off
- Sand Lighthouse
- U.S. National Register of Historic Places
- Michigan State Historic Site
- Location within Michigan Location within the United States
- Location: 12 Waterplant Rd., Escanaba, Michigan
- Coordinates: 45°44′40″N 87°2′40″W
- Built: 1868
- Architect: United States Lighthouse Service
- Architectural style: Lighthouse
- NRHP reference No.: 97001474

Significant dates
- Added to NRHP: December 1, 1997
- Designated MSHS: February 25, 1988

The Sand Point Lighthouse is located in Escanaba, Michigan, United States, on Lake Michigan's northern shore. Since 1989, it has been an unofficial aid to navigation. Though it is an operational aid to navigation, the restored lighthouse is now open to the public during the summer months. It is also known as the Escanaba/Sand Point (Little Bay de Noc) Light or the Escanaba Light.

This Sand Point Light is one of two bearing that name in Michigan. The other is in Baraga.

== History ==
Soon after it became a town in 1863, Escanaba was quickly growing as an important shipping port. The Peninsula Railroad was completed in 1864, which linked Escanaba to the iron mines of the Upper Peninsula to the north. Iron ore docks were built in the Escanaba harbor and the shipping of iron ore to steel mills along the Great Lakes became Escanaba's leading industry.

As shipping traffic increased dramatically, so did the need for some sort of light structure to guide the ships in and out of the harbor and to warn them of the treacherous sand shoals that reached out into Little Bay de Noc from Sand Point, a sandspit located just south of and adjacent to the harbor area. The United States Lighthouse Service approved construction of the Sand Point Lighthouse at a cost of $11,000. Construction began in the fall of 1867 and was completed in early spring 1868. The light first shone on the night of May 13, 1868.

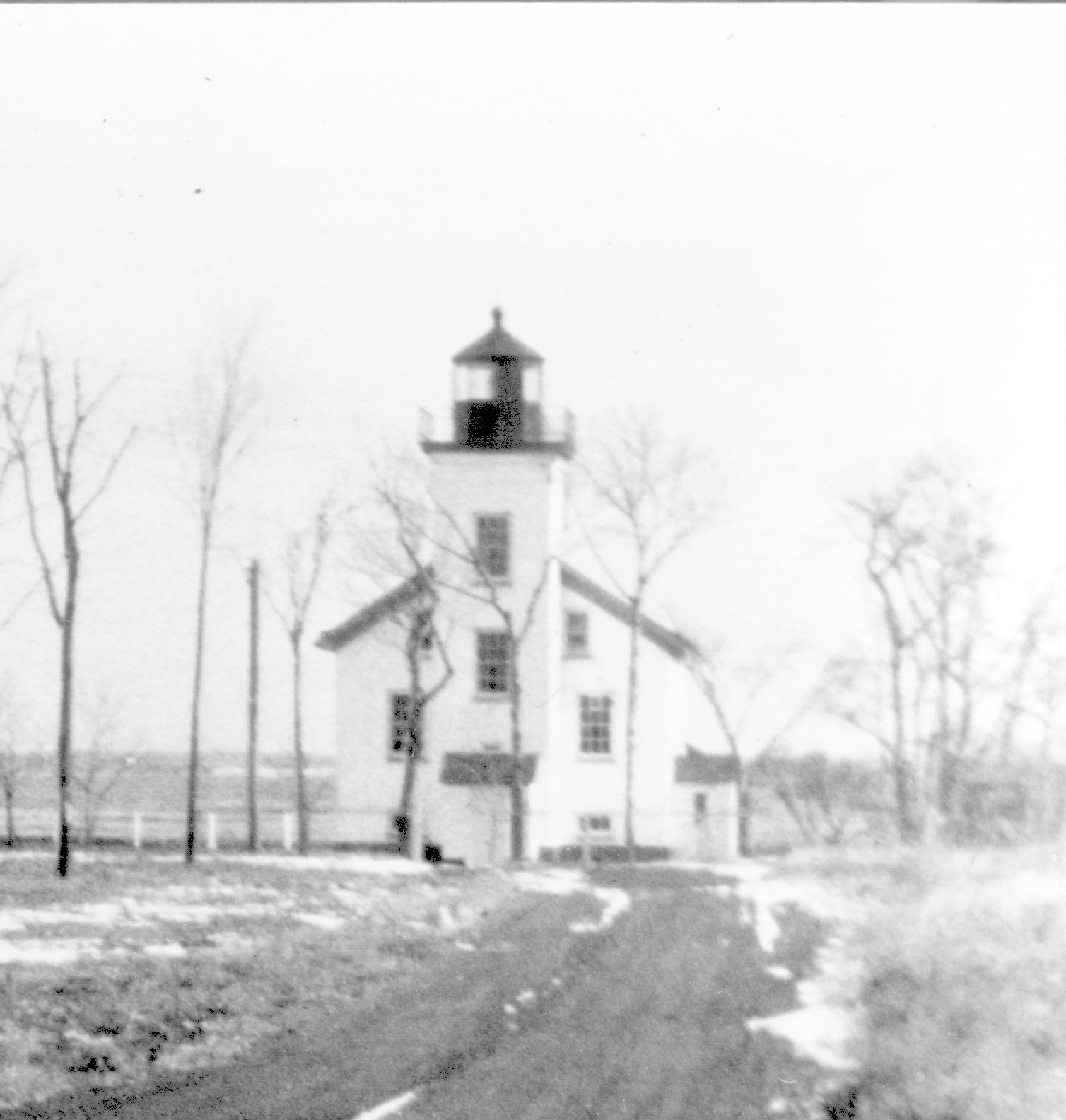
Sand Point Lighthouse

The Sand Point Lighthouse is a story-and-a-half rectangular building with an attached brick tower. The tower is topped with a cast iron lantern room which houses a fourth order Fresnel lens, emitting a fixed red light with a radiating power of 11.5 miles (18.5 km). A unique distinction concerning the Sand Point Lighthouse is that it was constructed with its tower facing the land instead of facing the water. Whether this orientation was intentional or an engineering blunder is unknown.

John Terry was appointed the first lighthouse keeper of the new lighthouse in December 1867, but he became very ill and died in April 1868 a month before the lighthouse was ready to be staffed and operated. With the lighthouse nearly completed but with no lightkeeper ready to report to duty, John Terry's wife, Mary, was appointed lightkeeper and subsequently became one of the first female lightkeepers on the Great Lakes. Mary Terry was a well-respected citizen in the community and fulfilled her duties as lightkeeper with efficiency and dedication. She was lightkeeper from 1868 to 1886, when a mysterious fire severely damaged the lighthouse and took her life. To date, no one knows exactly what happened or why it happened. Some speculate that it was an attempted burglary and that the suspect set the lighthouse afire to cover any evidence of wrongdoing. The south entrance door showed signs of forced entry, yet none of Mary Terry's valuables were taken. With the lighthouse badly damaged, restoration took nearly two full months and a new lightkeeper, Lewis Rose, was appointed to take over.

Over the years a number of changes took place at the Sand Point Lighthouse. Perhaps the most significant was when the lighthouse was hooked up to the city's electric supply in 1913. This meant that the kerosene lamp was removed from within the lens and replaced with an incandescent light bulb.

== The Coast Guard years ==
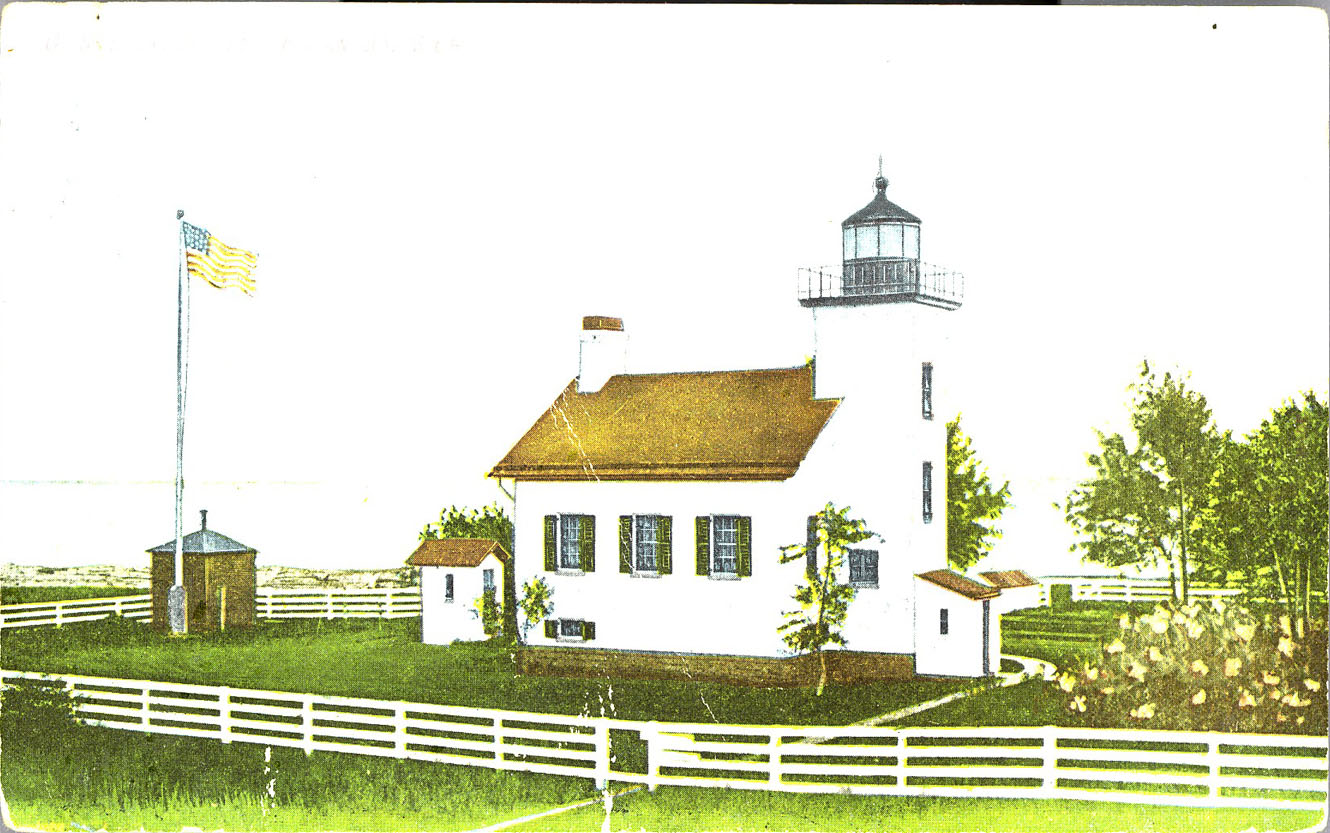
Sand Point Lighthouse postcard

A total of nine lightkeepers and their families lived in the Sand Point Lighthouse from its inception in 1868 to its deactivation in 1939. It was in this year that the United States Coast Guard took over all navigational lights in the country from the National Lighthouse Service. The Coast Guard constructed an automated crib light several hundred feet offshore, which replaced the function and duties of the Sand Point Lighthouse and its lightkeeper. The automated crib light is still in use today and can be seen from the tower of the Sand Point Lighthouse.

The Sand Point Lighthouse was no longer operational, but it continued to serve as housing for Coast Guard seaman who were assigned to duty in Escanaba. Upon using the lighthouse as their residence, the Coast Guard made many changes to the structure. The lantern room was removed and the tower was lowered by ten feet. In addition, the roof was raised to create a full second floor, several windows were added and the entire building was covered in aluminum siding. With these changes, the Sand Point Lighthouse was barely recognizable.

== Restoration ==
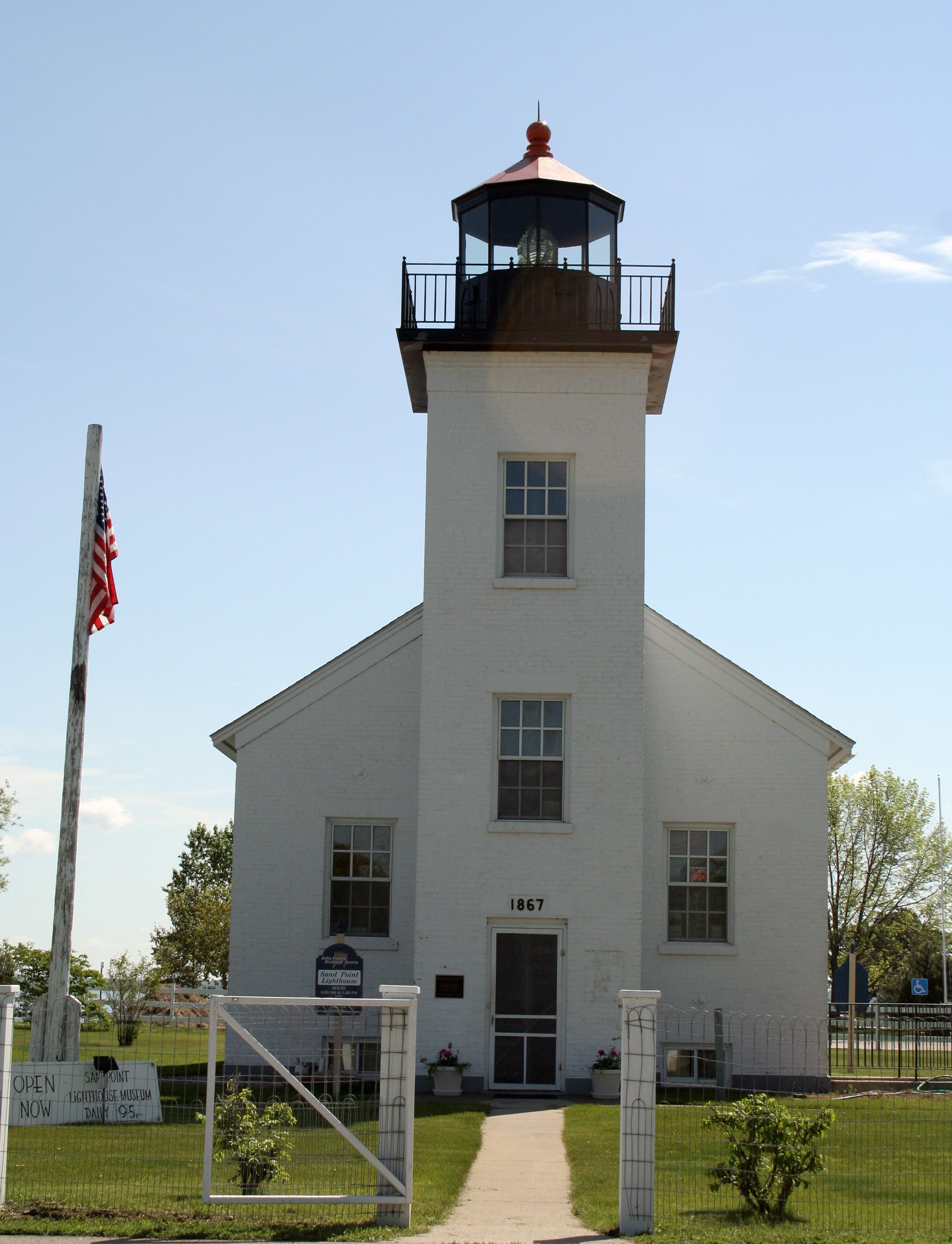
Sand Point Lighthouse

The U.S. Coast Guard occupied the building until 1985 when they moved to a new location. The abandoned lighthouse was then obtained by the Delta County Historical Society in 1986 with plans to restore it back to its original appearance. With the help of the original 1867 plan of the building, the Delta County Historical Society began extensive research and fundraising for this immense restoration project. The historical society first removed the aluminum siding to expose the original brickwork. The roof was lowered to its original level, the new windows were bricked-in and the ten foot lopped-off tower was rebuilt. Since the original lantern room and lens were not salvaged, the historical society had to look elsewhere for replacements. They found a lantern room on nearby Poverty Island which had been removed from the Poverty Island Light Station there and was sitting on the ground next to the tower for nearly a decade. In 1989, along with the lantern room, a fourth order fresnel lens was obtained from the Menominee Pier Light, both of which were nearly exact duplicates of the originals that once sat atop Sand Point Lighthouse and the lens was replaced.A photo of the installed Fourth Order Fresnel lens is available. To finish the restoration, the lighthouse was painted white and the interior space was restored and furnished as a turn of the 20th century replica.

After a dedication ceremony in July 1990, the newly restored Sand Point lighthouse was opened to the public. Each year the lighthouse is open from Memorial Day to October 1, giving visitors a chance to climb the tower and witness what it would have been like to be a lightkeeper around the turn of the 20th century. An admission fee is charged.

The light is listed on the National Register of Historical Places, Reference #97001474. Name of Listing: Sand Point Lighthouse. It is also on the state inventory list, beginning in 1989.

== Gallery ==
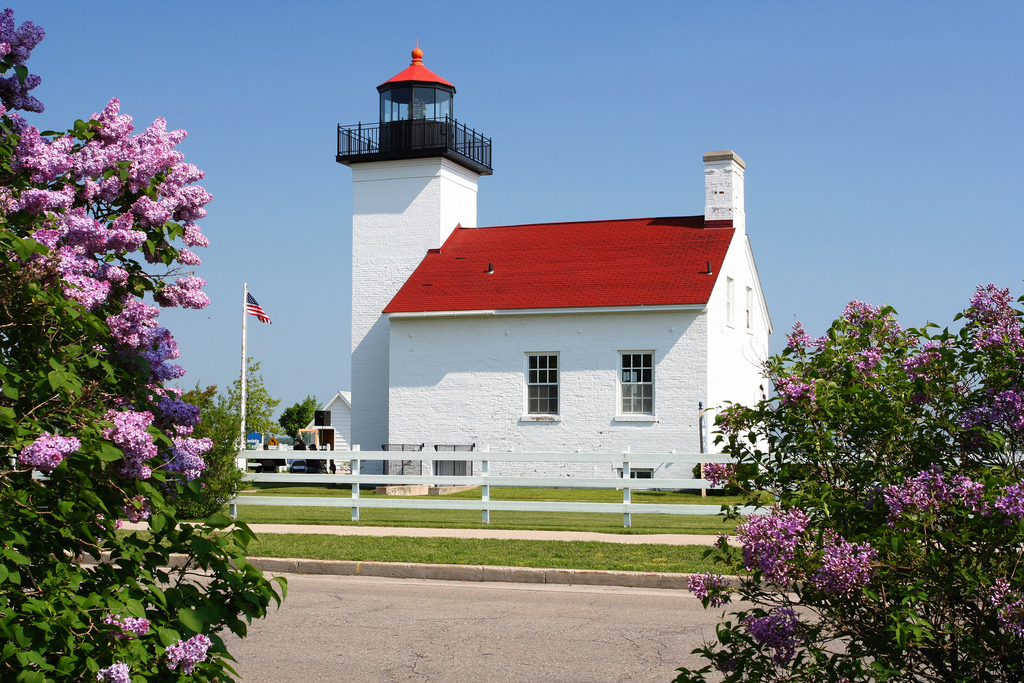

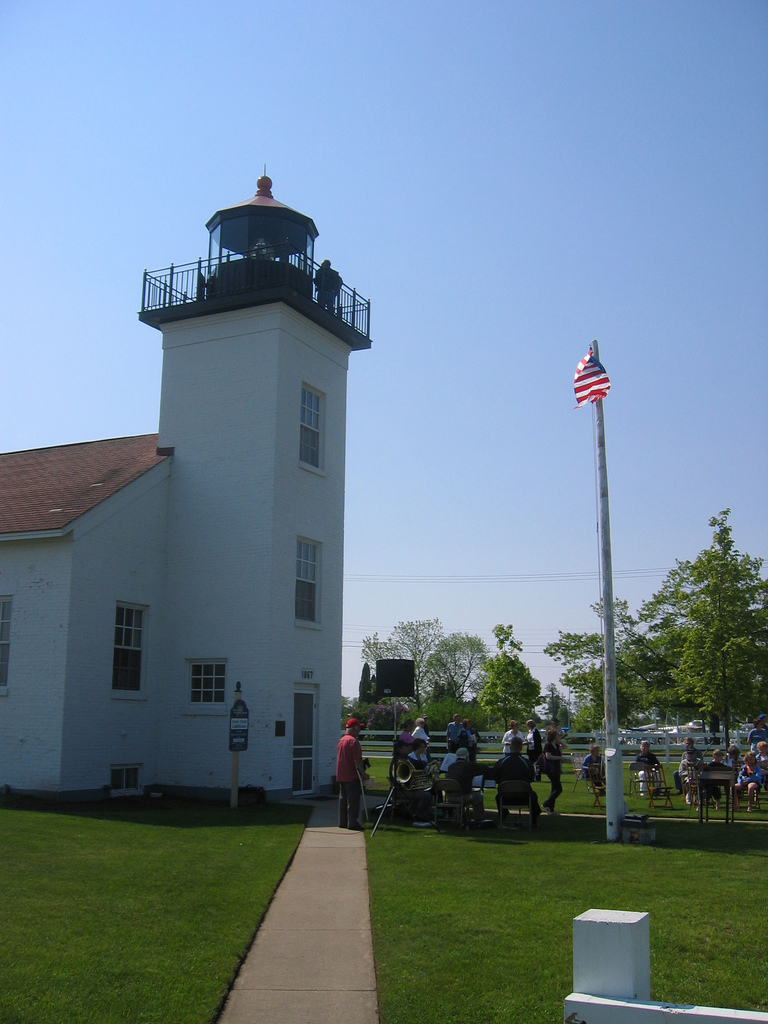

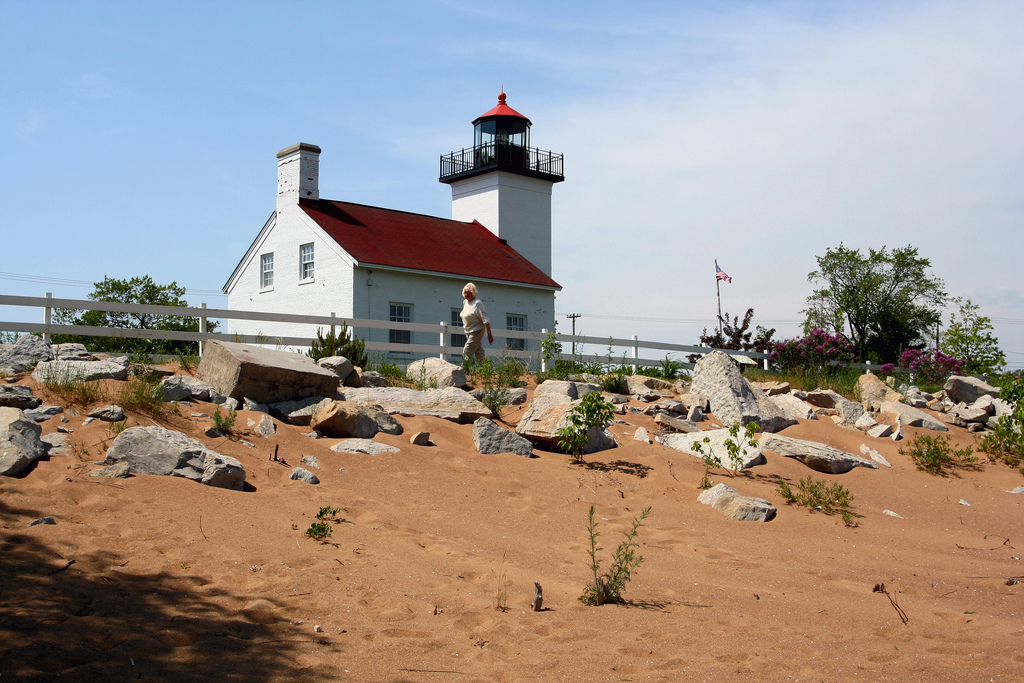

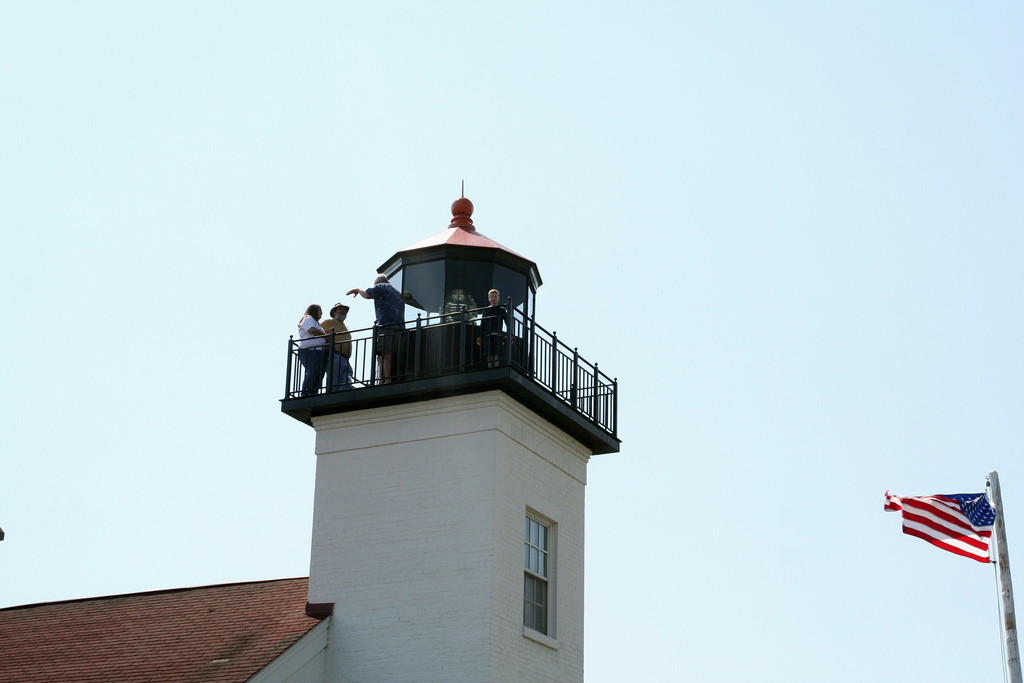

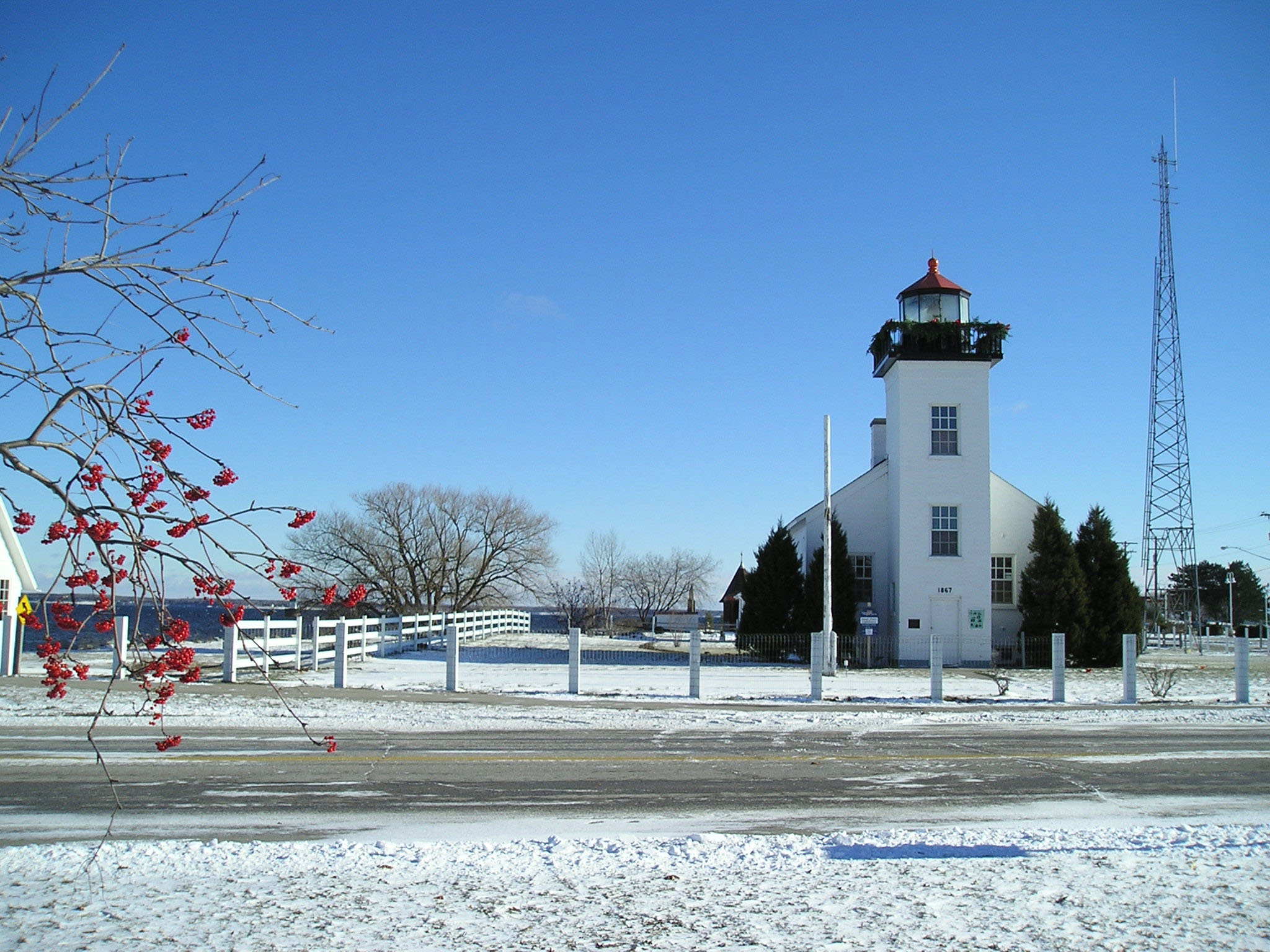

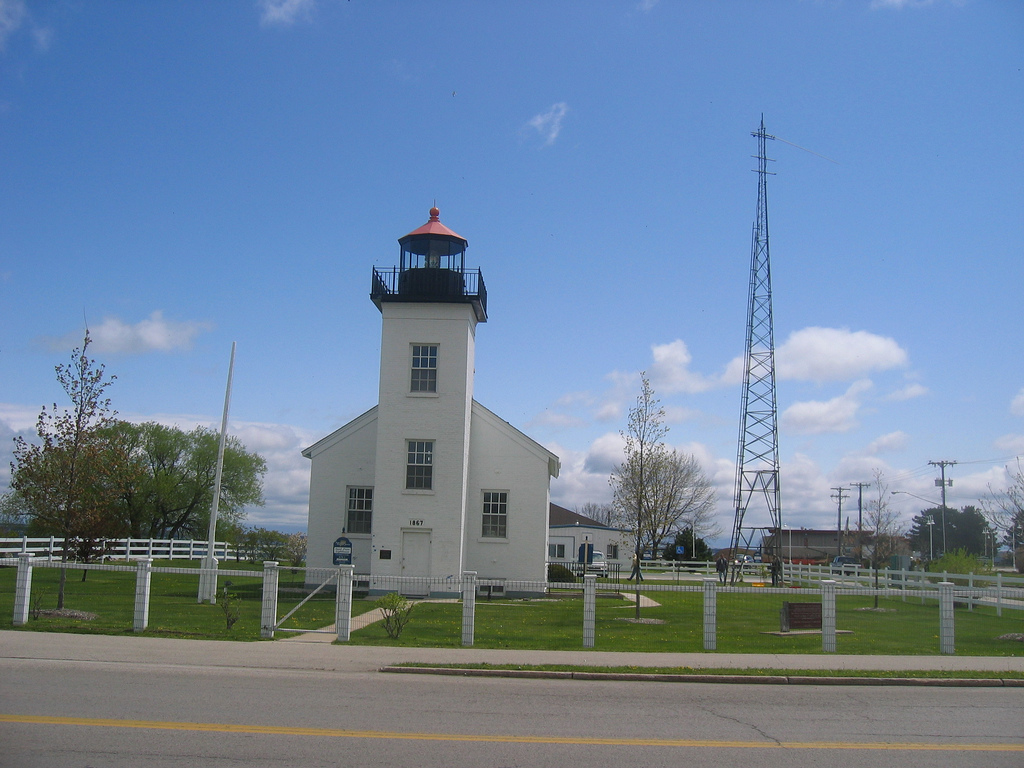

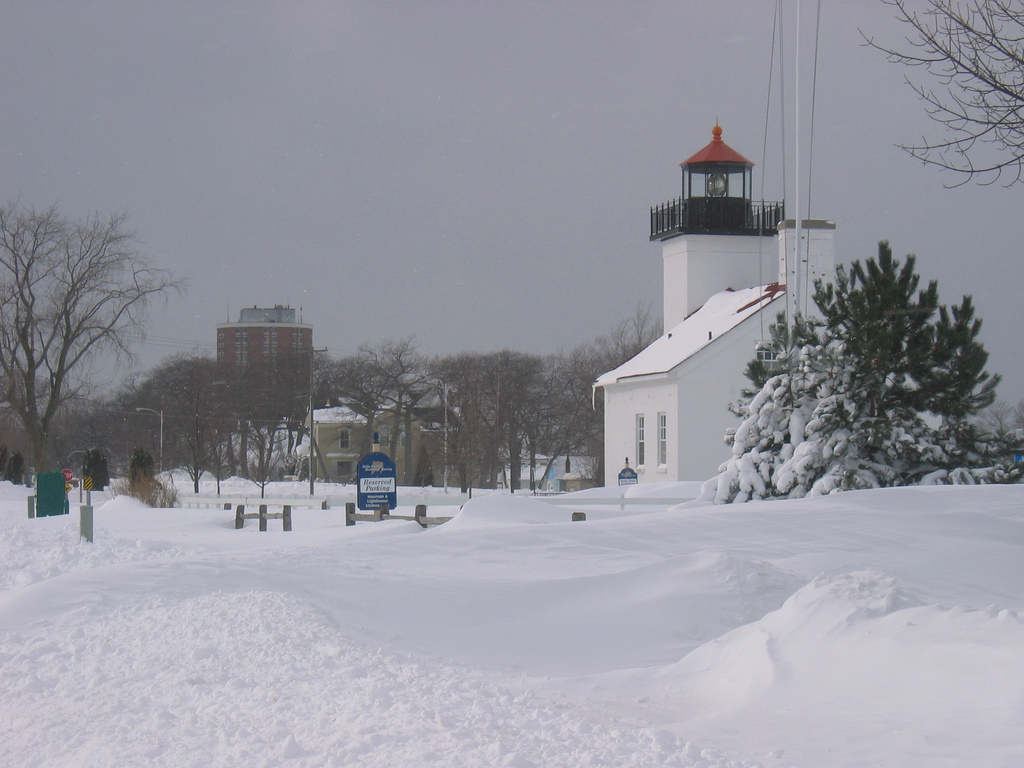

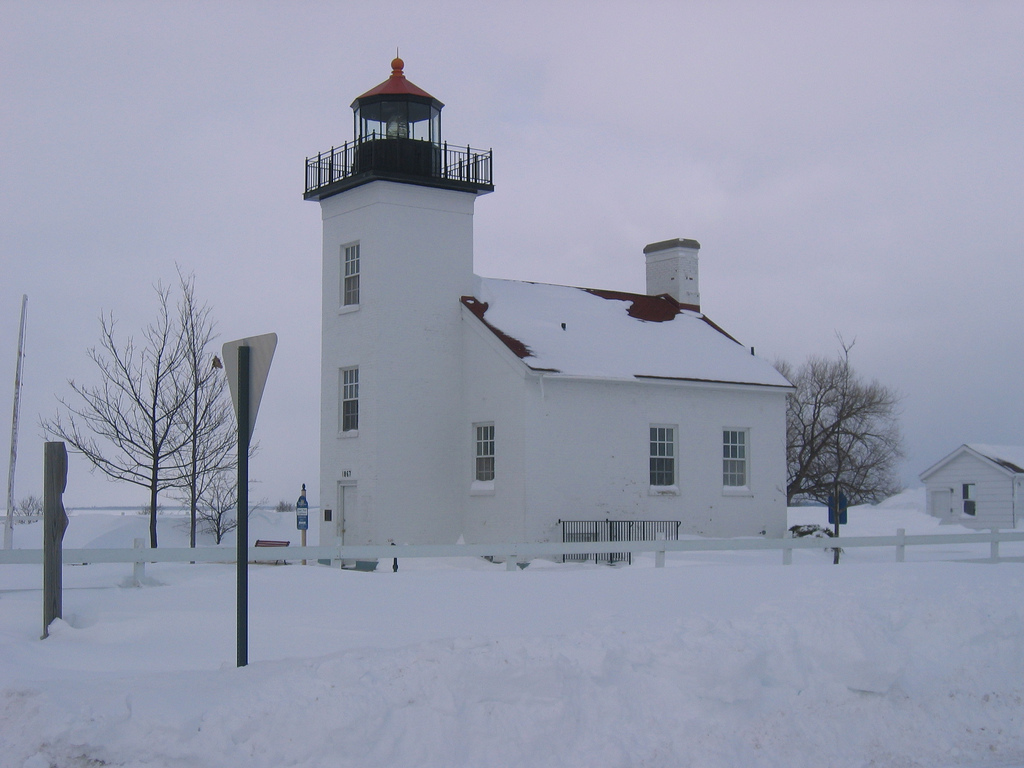

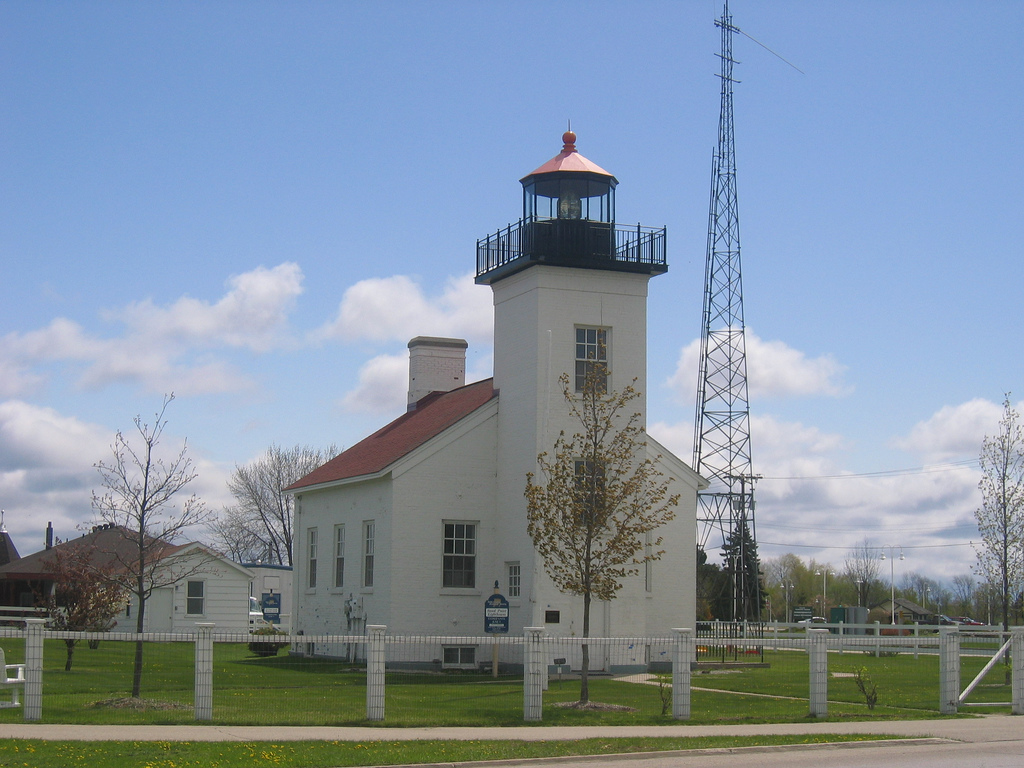

== See also ==
- National Register of Historic Places listings in Delta County, Michigan
- Lighthouses in Michigan
- Escanaba, Michigan

== Specialized further reading ==
- Mason, Kathy S. Mystery at Sand Point Lighthouse, Michigan History Magazine, September/October 2003.
- Terry Pepper, Seeing the Light, Sand Point Lighthouse, Escanaba, Michigan.
