= Nahma Township, Michigan =

- Civil township
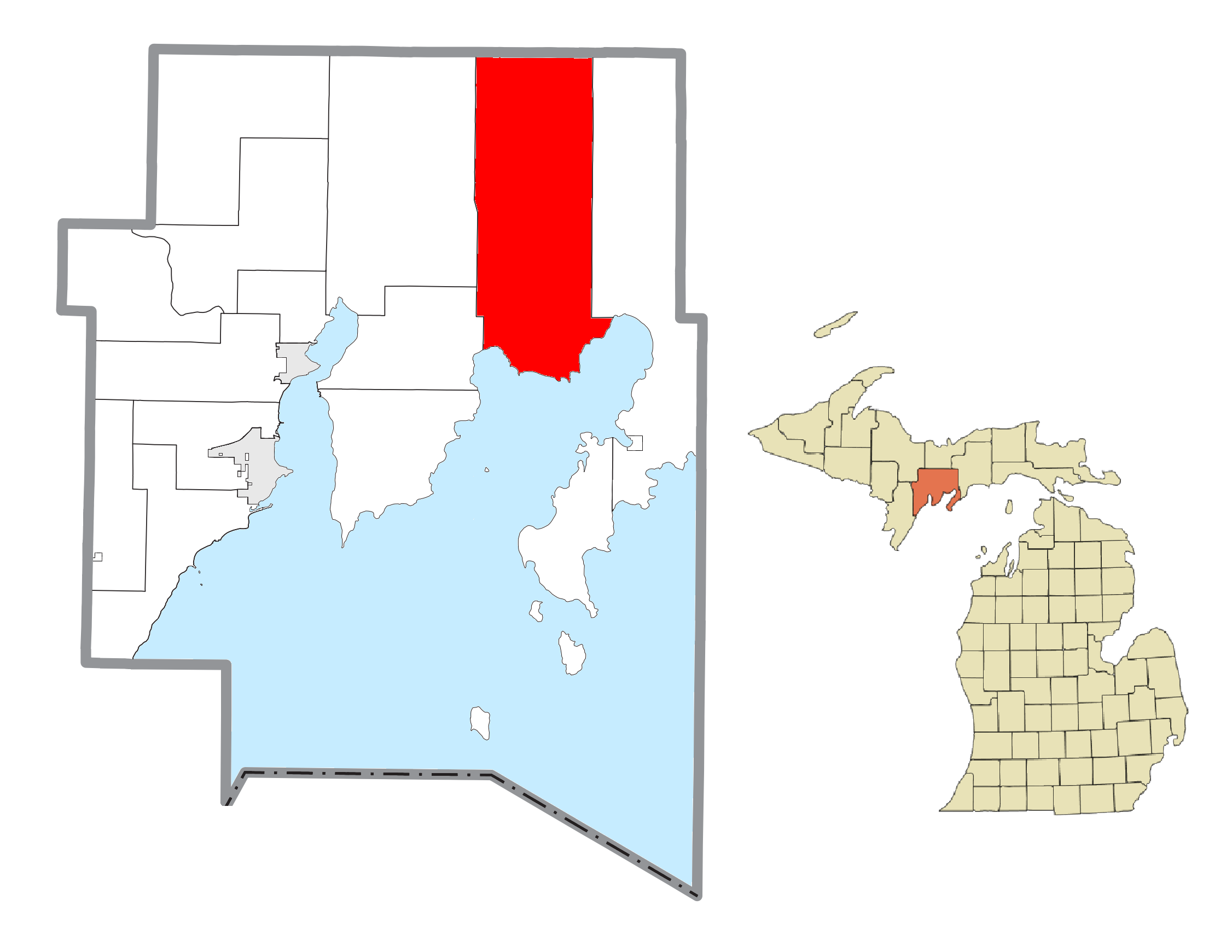
- Location within Delta County

- Location within the state of Michigan Nahma Township (the United States)
- Coordinates: 46°01′02″N 86°42′01″W
- Country: United States
- State: Michigan
- County: Delta

Government
  - Supervisor: Herbert A. Pomeroy

Area
  - Total: 188.9 sq mi (489.2 km^{2})
  - Land: 166.3 sq mi (430.6 km^{2})
  - Water: 22.6 sq mi (58.6 km^{2})
- Elevation: 673 ft (205 m)

Population (2020)
  - Total: 468
  - Density: 2.81/sq mi (1.09/km^{2})
- Time zone: UTC-5 (Eastern (EST))
  - Summer (DST): UTC-4 (EDT)
- ZIP code(s): 49864, 49878, 49895
- Area code: 906
- FIPS code: 26-56500
- GNIS feature ID: 1626788
- Website: https://www.nahmatownship.us/

Nahma Township is a civil township of Delta County in the U.S. state of Michigan. The population was 468 at the 2020 census, slightly down from 495 at the 2010 census. Nahma was established in 1881 by the Bay De Noquet Lumber Company as the base for its upper Michigan lumbering operations.

== Geography ==
According to the United States Census Bureau, the township has a total area of 188.9 square miles (489 km^{2}), of which 166.2 square miles (430 km^{2}) is land and 22.6 square miles (59 km^{2}) (11.98%) is water. The city derives its name from the Ojibway (Chippewa) language, in which Nami means sturgeon.

=== Climate ===
Indian Point

Climate chart (precipitation, max. and min. temperature)
J	F	M	A	M	J	J	A	S	O	N	D
63 −10 −15	52 −13 −18	55 −4 −8	78 4 −1	63 11 6	91 12 11	113 20 16	74 18 16	118 16 15	118 9 6	104 6 2	64 −1 −4
- █ Average max. and min. temperatures in °C
- █ Precipitation totals in mm
Imperial conversion
J	F	M	A	M	J	J	A	S	O	N	D
2.5 14 5	2 9 0	2.2 25 18	3.1 39 30	2.5 52 43	3.6 54 52	4.4 68 61	2.9 64 61	4.6 61 59	4.6 48 43	4.1 43 36	2.5 30 25
- █ Average max. and min. temperatures in °F
- █ Precipitation totals in inches

== Demographics ==
As of the census of 2000, there were 499 people, 221 households, and 154 families residing in the township. The population density was 3.0 per square mile (1.2/km^{2}). There were 603 housing units at an average density of 3.6 per square mile (1.4/km^{2}). The racial makeup of the township was 91.58% White, 0.20% African American, 5.41% Native American, and 2.81% from two or more races. Hispanic or Latino of any race were 0.20% of the population.

There were 221 households, out of which 19.9% had children under the age of 18 living with them, 63.8% were married couples living together, 3.6% had a female householder with no husband present, and 30.3% were non-families. 27.1% of all households were made up of individuals, and 16.3% had someone living alone who was 65 years of age or older. The average household size was 2.26 and the average family size was 2.73.

In the township the population was spread out, with 19.8% under the age of 18, 3.4% from 18 to 24, 19.6% from 25 to 44, 28.9% from 45 to 64, and 28.3% who were 65 years of age or older. The median age was 51 years. For every 100 females, there were 106.2 males. For every 100 females age 18 and over, there were 103.0 males.

The median income for a household in the township was $28,077, and the median income for a family was $34,167. Males had a median income of $31,000 versus $17,679 for females. The per capita income for the township was $16,981. About 8.9% of families and 12.6% of the population were below the poverty line, including 14.4% of those under age 18 and 7.7% of those age 65 or over.
