= Emma Genevieve Gillette =

American environmentalist

E. Genevieve Gillette (May 19, 1898 – May 23, 1986) was an early conservationist in Michigan, United States.

== Life ==
She was born in Lansing on May 19, 1898. In 1901 she and her family moved to a farm on the Grand River in Dimondale. She attended Michigan Agricultural College, Michigan State University. She was allowed to sit-in on a chemistry class after meeting with the college president Frank S. Kedzie, who had been a friend of her father's. She was the only woman to graduate in the college’s first landscape architecture class in 1920. After graduating and sending out dozens of applications, she only received one job offer: in Chicago as an assistant to the garden designer, Jens Jensen.

During the early 1920s, she developed a close friendship with P. J. Hoffmaster, Superintendent of State Parks (1922–1934) and later Director of the Department of Conservation. Hoffmaster enlisted the aid of Gillette to scout the state for areas of land having state park potential, an assignment which she made her life’s work.

Beginning in 1924, she helped locate and raise public support and funding for parks at Ludington, Hartwick Pines, Wilderness, and Porcupine Mountains. Other parks included Sleeping Bear Dunes National Lakeshore, Pictured Rocks National Lakeshore, the Huron-Clinton Metroparks system, and what was to become the P. J. Hoffmaster State Park in the sand dunes area of Lake Michigan between Grand Haven and Muskegon.

To assist in garnering public support for her projects, she founded and was president of the Michigan Parks Association. This group was instrumental in promoting a large state bond issue for parks and recreation in 1969. Gillette herself labored on the proposed bond issue for a period of ten years. She was also mainly responsible for securing federal funding for the Michigan state parks system in the mid-sixties, arguing that substantial numbers of park users were from out-of-state and that these users should share in the cost of upkeep of the state system.

During this period she was also appointed by President Johnson to serve on the President's Advisory Committee on Recreation and Natural Beauty. She also served on many other important boards and committees over the years. As late as 1981 she was also serving on the Wilderness and Natural Areas Advisory Board of Michigan by appointment of the Governor.

The Gillette Nature Center at the Hoffmaster State Park, which was dedicated in 1976, stands as a tribute to Gillette whose determination helped to preserve the state’s natural heritage for future generations to enjoy. It might justly be said of Genevieve Gillette: "If you are seeking for her monument, look about you."

Gillette died in 1986 in Ann Arbor, Michigan and is buried in the Mount Hope Cemetery in Lansing. Her estate provided a $300,000 trust to acquire new lands for the public benefit. The final park she created was Thompson's Harbor State Park in Presque Isle County.
