= Hoffmaster State Park =

State park in Michigan, United States

P. J. Hoffmaster State Park
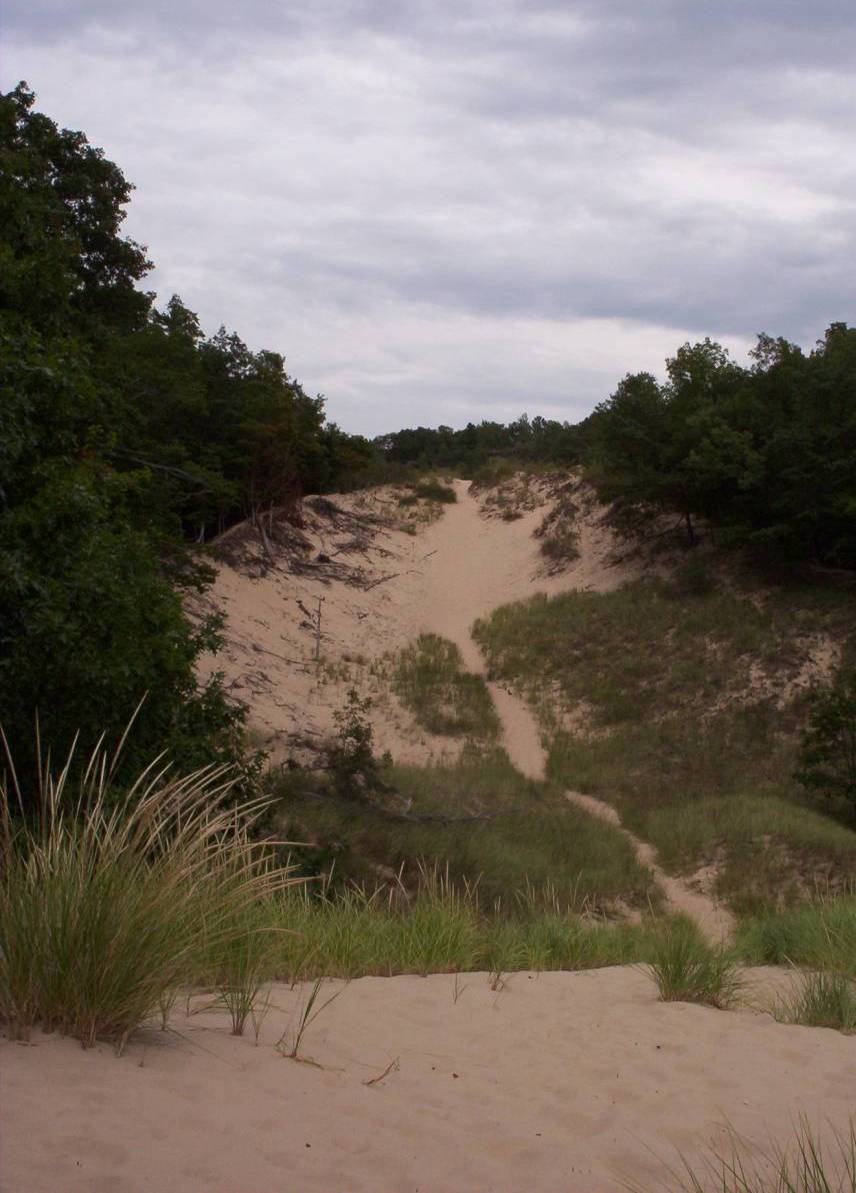
- Parabolic dune with damage to dune grass on unauthorized trail in center of photograph

- Location within Michigan Location within the United States
- Location: Muskegon and Ottawa counties, Michigan, United States
- Nearest city: Norton Shores, Michigan
- Coordinates: 43°07′26″N 86°15′54″W
- Area: 1,200 acres (490 ha)
- Elevation: 669 feet (204 m)
- Established: 1963
- Administrator: Michigan Department of Natural Resources
- Designation: Michigan state park
- Website: Official website

P. J. Hoffmaster State Park is a public recreation area on the shores of Lake Michigan located five miles north of Grand Haven at the southwest corner of Norton Shores, in Muskegon County, and the northwest corner of Spring Lake Township, in Ottawa County, in the U.S. state of Michigan. The state park's 1,200 acres (490 ha) of land include three miles (4.8 km) of sand beach on the lake. It is operated by the Michigan Department of Natural Resources.

== History ==
Established in 1963, the park is named after Percy James Hoffmaster, sometimes considered the founder of the Michigan state parks system, who served as the Superintendent of State Parks and longest-acting Director of the Department of Conservation. The park's nature center is named for Emma Genevieve Gillette, who scouted locations for new state parks under Hoffmaster.

== Activities and amenities ==
The Gillette Sand Dune Visitor Center features interactive exhibits related to the sand dune ecosystem within the park. The center also has live animals and an auditorium and offers many nature programs for the public. There are ten miles (16 km) of hiking trails, including the Dune Climb Stairway, the Walk-a-Mile, and Homestead trails. Three miles (4.8 km) of trail are groomed in the winter for cross-country skiing. There are two campgrounds and a beach. Bird watchers come to view migrating songbirds (wood thrushes and orioles plus warblers and sparrows of various species) and migrating raptors (sharp-shinned and broad-winged hawks and even the occasional eagle or falcon).

== In the news ==
The park made international headlines on July 8, 2009, when a man fell asleep in his truck and backed over his family tent, injuring his wife and two young children.
