= Butlers Island (Michigan) =

Island in Michigan, United States

- Location within Michigan Location within the United States

Geography
- Location: Lake Michigan
- Coordinates: 45°51′40″N 87°00′57″W
- Area: 2.04 acres (0.83 ha)
- Highest elevation: 581 ft (177.1 m)

Administration
- United States
- State: Michigan
- County: Delta County

Demographics
- Population: Uninhabited

Butlers Island is an island in Delta County, Michigan. The island is located inside the bay of Little Bay de Noc in Lake Michigan. Butlers Island is 2.04 acres (0.83 ha) in size and under a mile north of Gladstone, Michigan. The island is uninhabited.
