= Wilson, Sheboygan County, Wisconsin =

Wilson, Wisconsin
- Town
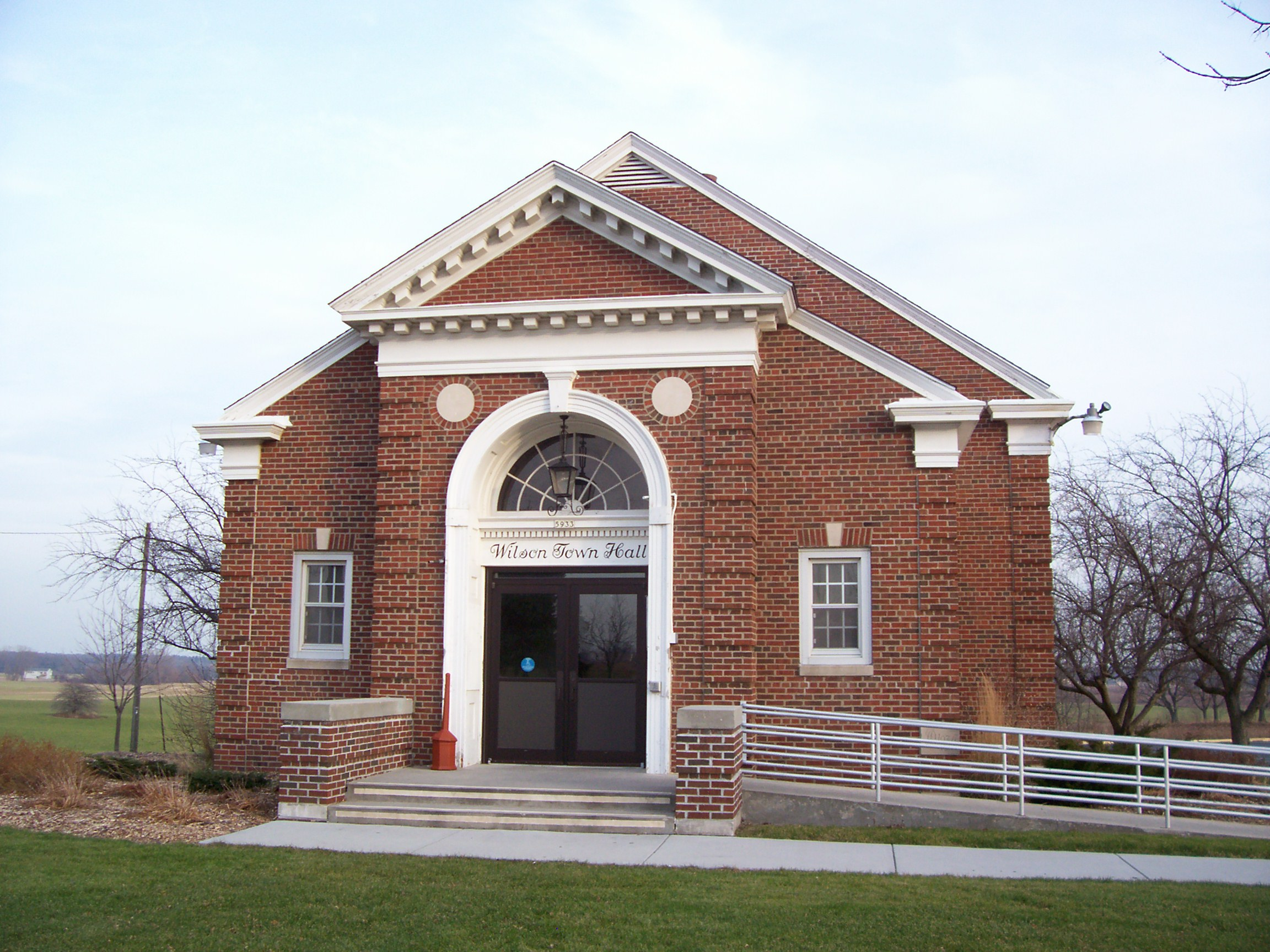
- Wilson Town Hall
- Etymology: named for Ohio settler David Wilson
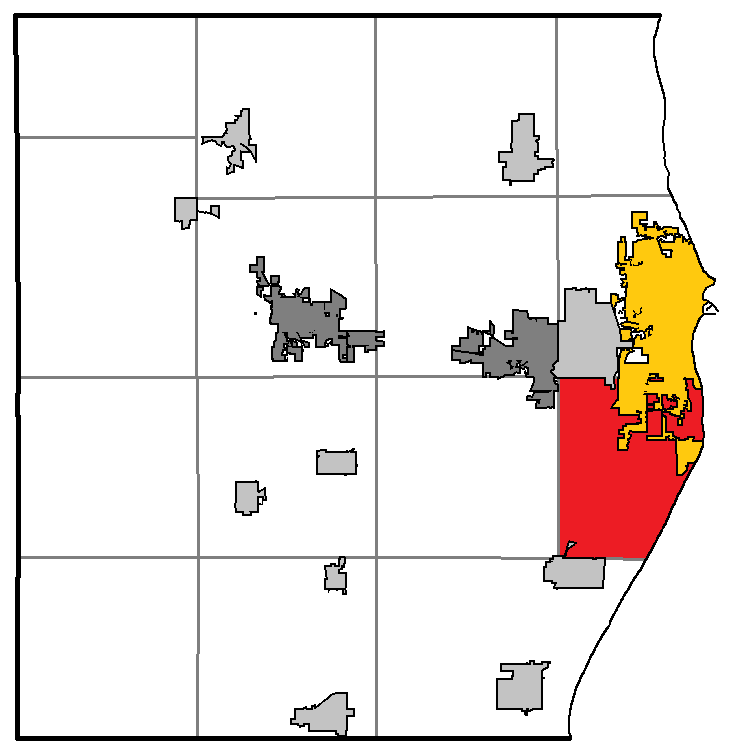
- Location of Wilson, within Sheboygan County
- Coordinates: 43°41′N 87°45′W
- Country: United States
- State: Wisconsin
- County: Sheboygan

Area
  - Total: 22.9 sq mi (59.4 km^{2})
  - Land: 22.9 sq mi (59.3 km^{2})
  - Water: 0.039 sq mi (0.1 km^{2})
- Elevation: 699 ft (213 m)

Population (2020)
  - Total: 3,484
  - Density: 152/sq mi (58.8/km^{2})
- Time zone: UTC-6 (Central (CST))
  - Summer (DST): UTC-5 (CDT)
- Area code: 920
- FIPS code: 55-87500
- GNIS feature ID: 1584448
- Website: www.townwilson.com

Wilson is a town in Sheboygan County, Wisconsin, United States. The population was 3,484 at the 2020 census. The unincorporated community of Weedens is located in the town. It is included in the Sheboygan, Wisconsin Metropolitan Statistical Area.

== Geography ==
According to the United States Census Bureau, the town has a total area of 22.9 square miles (59.4 km^{2}), of which 22.9 square miles (59.3 km^{2}) is land and 0.04 square miles (0.1 km^{2}) (0.17%) is water.

== Demographics ==
As of the census of 2000, there were 3,227 people, 1,235 households, and 974 families residing in the town. The population density was 141.0 people per square mile (54.5/km^{2}). There were 1,323 housing units at an average density of 57.8 per square mile (22.3/km^{2}). The racial makeup of the town was 96.81% White, 0.22% African American, 0.15% Native American, 1.36% Asian, 0.84% from other races, and 0.62% from two or more races. Hispanic or Latino of any race were 2.32% of the population.

There were 1,235 households, out of which 31.8% had children under the age of 18 living with them, 72.1% were married couples living together, 4.3% had a female householder with no husband present, and 21.1% were non-families. 18.3% of all households were made up of individuals, and 7.5% had someone living alone who was 65 years of age or older. The average household size was 2.59 and the average family size was 2.94.

In the town, the population was spread out, with 24.4% under the age of 18, 5.7% from 18 to 24, 27.1% from 25 to 44, 30.3% from 45 to 64, and 12.5% who were 65 years of age or older. The median age was 42 years. For every 100 females, there were 107.8 males. For every 100 females age 18 and over, there were 104.9 males.

The median income for a household in the town was $59,241, and the median income for a family was $63,523. Males had a median income of $46,091 versus $26,172 for females. The per capita income for the town was $27,798. About 2.1% of families and 2.5% of the population were below the poverty line, including 3.0% of those under age 18 and none of those age 65 or over.

== Government ==
The Black River Fire Department provides fire suppression to the town. Law enforcement services are provided by the Sheboygan County Sheriff's Office. A part-time town constable is employed to address parking and ordinance concerns.

== Places ==
Kohler-Andrae State Park is located in the southern part of the town. The James Tellen Woodland Sculpture Garden is located on Evergreen Drive. The site, cared for by the John Michael Kohler Arts Center, is dotted with sculptures connected by a woodland path. Sheboygan Indian Mound Park contains effigy mounds. The park is owned and operated by the city of Sheboygan, but completely surrounded by the town.

== Notable people ==
- George W. Weeden, Wisconsin State Representative, lived in the town
- Joseph Wolfinger, Wisconsin State Representative, was born in the town

== Images ==
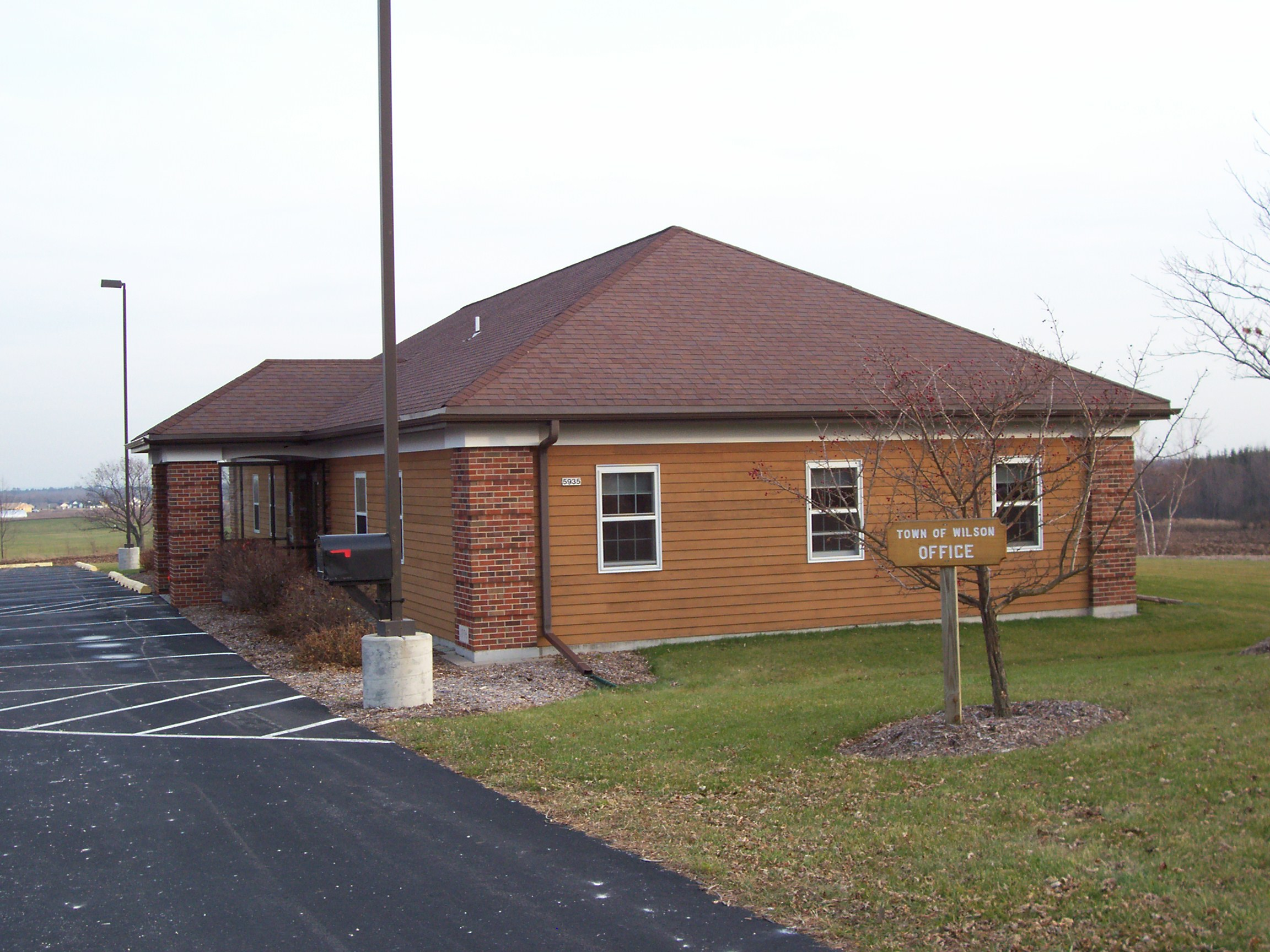
Town office

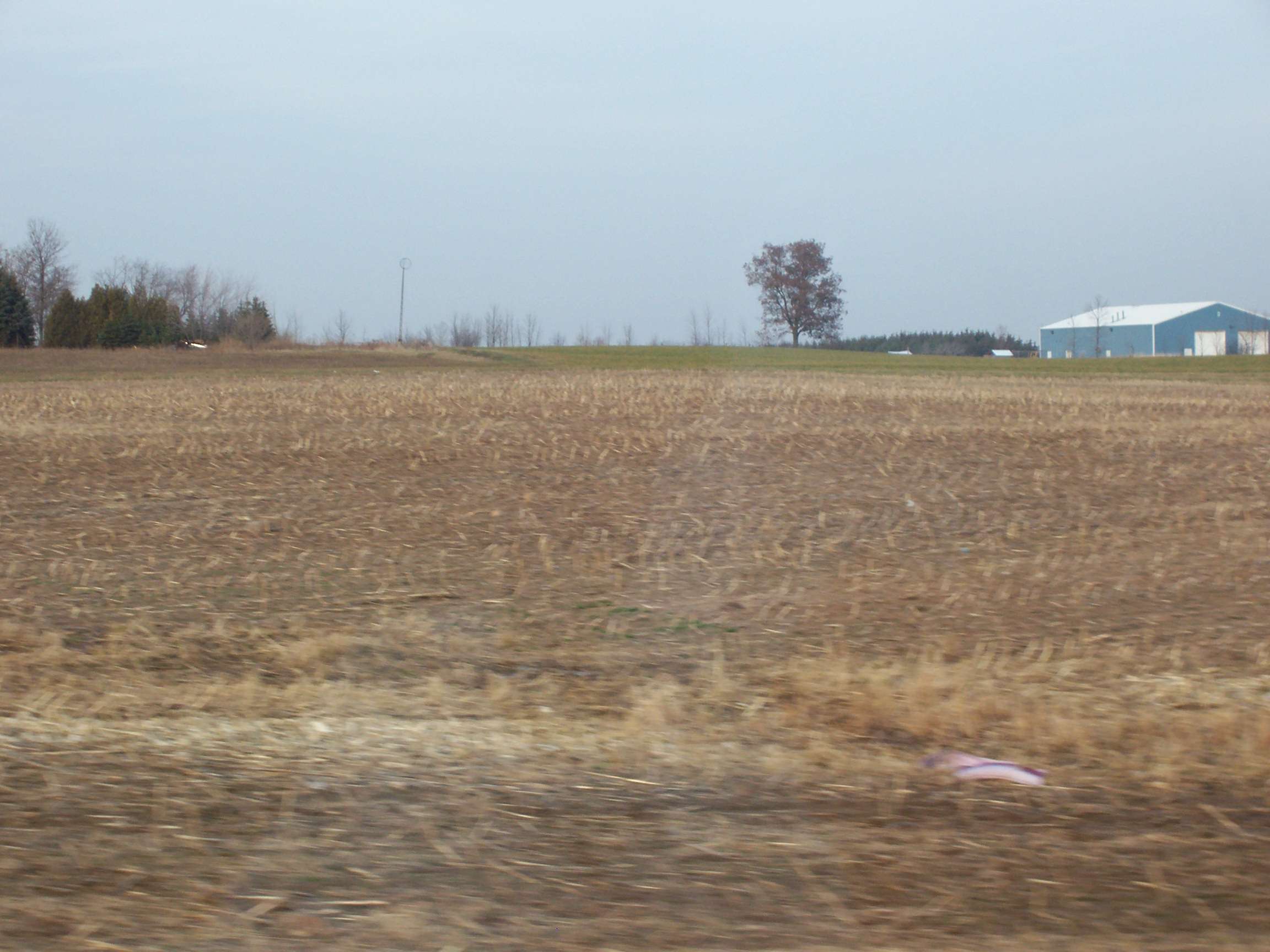
A harvested corn field in the Town of Wilson

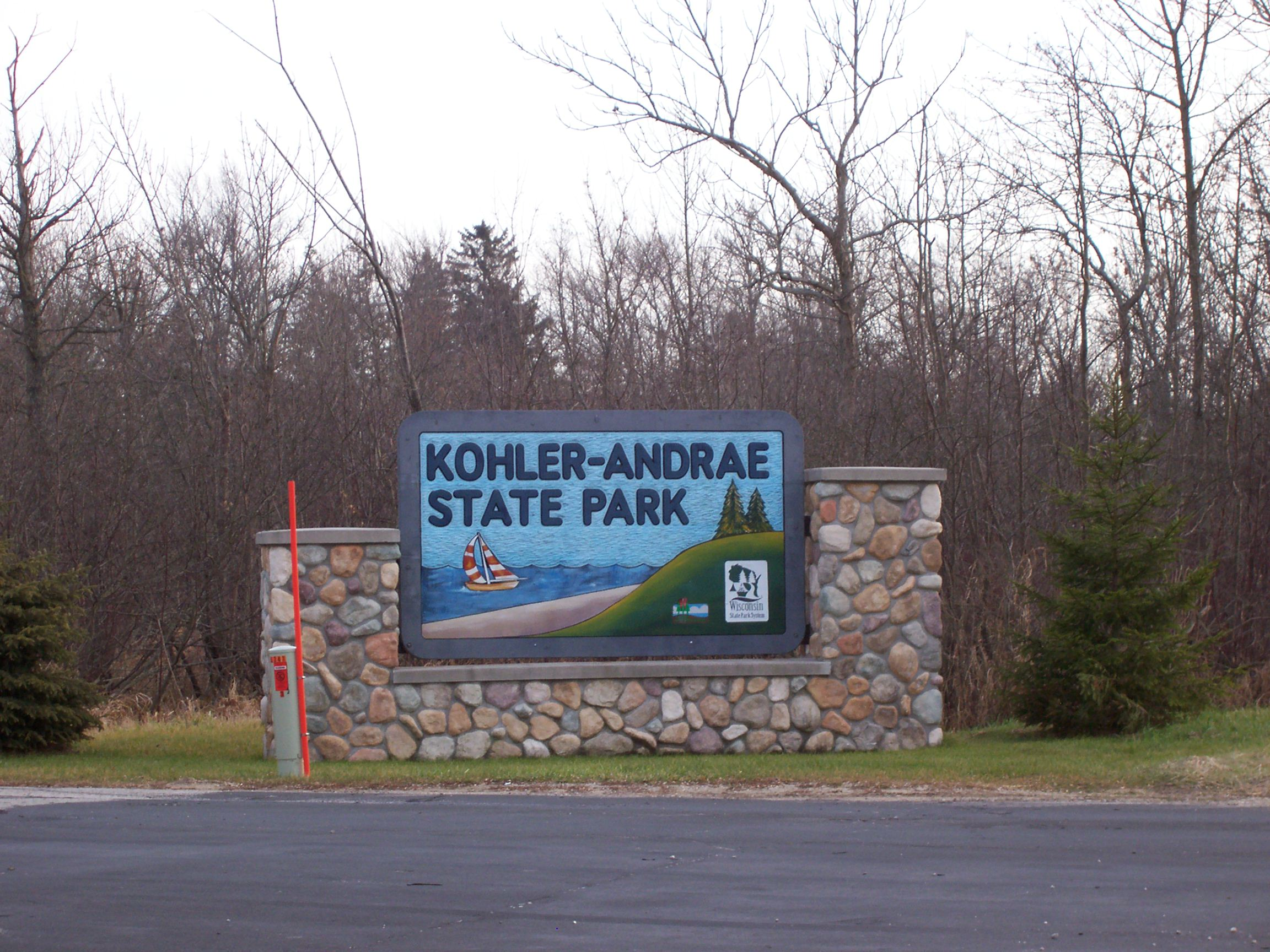
Kohler-Andrae State Park

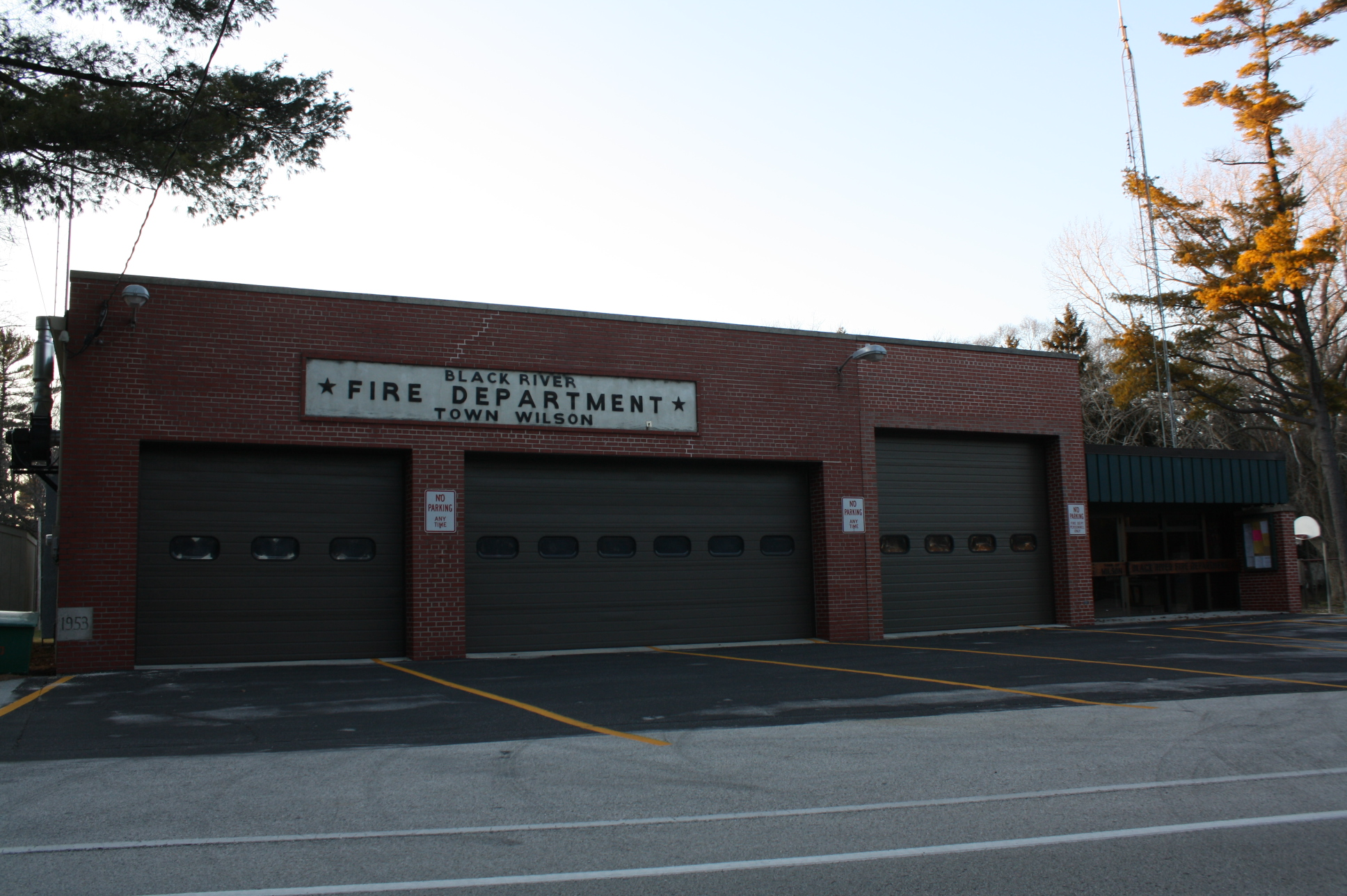
Black River Fire Department

== See also ==
- List of towns in Wisconsin
