= Weedens, Wisconsin =

- Unincorporated community
- Location within Wisconsin Location within the United States
- Coordinates: 43°41′16″N 87°46′19″W
- Country: United States
- State: Wisconsin
- County: Sheboygan
- Elevation: 679 ft (207 m)
- Time zone: UTC-6 (Central (CST))
  - Summer (DST): UTC-5 (CDT)
- Area code: 920
- GNIS feature ID: 1577873

Weedens is an unincorporated community in the town of Wilson, Sheboygan County, in the U.S. state of Wisconsin.

== History ==
The community was named for G. W. Weeden, a Sheboygan County judge.
