= Breakwater Chicago =

Proposed vessel on Lake Michigan

Breakwater Chicago was announced in 2014 as a proposal for a floating entertainment venue on Lake Michigan, about 1.1 miles (1.8 km) off Chicago's shoreline.

The proposed Breakwater Chicago vessel was to be about the size of an American football field, approximately 300 by 100 feet (91 by 30 m), and was planned to include sun-decks, restaurants, a large swimming pool, and shops.

== Development ==
The concept was developed by Chicago entrepreneur Beau D'Arcy, with Space Architects + Planners as architect of record. In June 2014, the project was estimated to cost $23 million.

As of June 2014, the project was in its design phase with construction planned for the summer of 2015. The project was announced to the public on June 9, 2014, alongside a crowdfunding campaign on Kickstarter, which raised more than $60,000 in donations from local supporters in the first month.

At the time of the announcement, the company hoped to open by July 2015, but had not obtained required approvals from the U.S. Coast Guard, the state, or the city. Alderman Brendan Reilly opposed the proposal, and environmental groups raised concerns about development on Lake Michigan.

In March 2016, the company remained in design and engineering and had not released specific construction or clearance details. In April 2017, the proposal was under Coast Guard review, with no launch date announced.

The company continued private fundraising. In a May 2019 filing with the U.S. Securities and Exchange Commission, it reported that an offering had raised $676,808 from 14 investors and listed its revenue range as no revenues.

== See also ==
- MV Protector, used as a marina breakwater on Lake Washington
