= St. Vital Island =

Island in Michigan, United States

- Location within Michigan Location within the United States

Geography
- Location: Big Bay de Noc, Lake Michigan
- Coordinates: 45°47′59″N 86°45′35″W
- Highest elevation: 587 ft (178.9 m)

Administration
- United States
- State: Michigan
- County: Delta County
- Township: Bay De Noc Township

St. Vital Island is an island in Bay De Noc Township, Delta County, Michigan. The island is located in Big Bay de Noc in Lake Michigan. It is 20.52 acres (8.30 ha) in size and under a half mile from the Stonington Peninsula shore. St. Vital Island is uninhabited and owned by the United States Forest Service. It is part of the Hiawatha National Forest. The island is home to a small colony of nesting Common terns and Black-crowned night herons.

== Climate ==
Saint Vital Island

Climate chart (precipitation, max. and min. temperature)
J	F	M	A	M	J	J	A	S	O	N	D
63 −12 −14	52 −13 −19	55 −4 −8	78 3 −2	63 8 7	91 12 11	113 19 16	74 18 15	118 17 16	118 9 8	104 8 2	64 −2 −5
- █ Average max. and min. temperatures in °C
- █ Precipitation totals in mm
Imperial conversion
J	F	M	A	M	J	J	A	S	O	N	D
2.5 10 7	2 9 −2	2.2 25 18	3.1 37 28	2.5 46 45	3.6 54 52	4.4 66 61	2.9 64 59	4.6 63 61	4.6 48 46	4.1 46 36	2.5 28 23
- █ Average max. and min. temperatures in °F
- █ Precipitation totals in inches
