= Little Gull Island (Michigan) =

Island in Michigan, United States

- Location within Michigan Location within the United States

Geography
- Location: Lake Michigan
- Coordinates: 45°29′56″N 86°42′52″W
- Area: 5.65 acres (2.29 ha)
- Highest elevation: 581 ft (177.1 m)

Administration
- United States
- State: Michigan
- County: Delta County
- Township: Fairbanks Township

Demographics
- Population: Uninhabited

Little Gull Island is an island in Fairbanks Township, Delta County, Michigan. The island is located at the mouth of the bay of Green Bay in Lake Michigan. It is part of a chain of islands that are outcroppings of the Niagara Escarpment. Little Gull Island is 5.65 acres (2.29 ha) in size and under a mile south of Gull Island. The Michigan Nature Association owns the entirety of the island.
