= Kohler-Andrae State Park =

State parks in Sheboygan County, Wisconsin

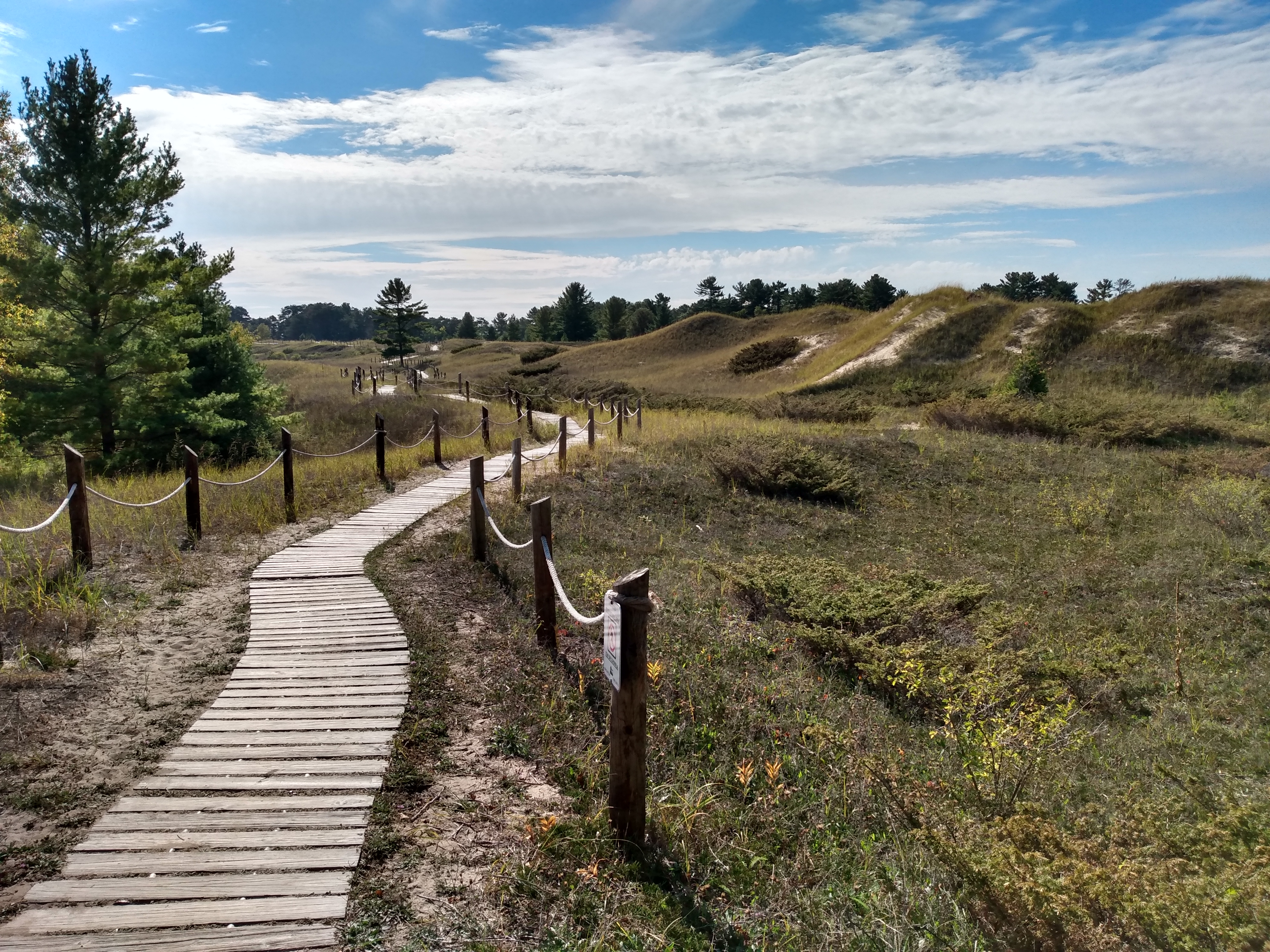
- A cordwalk on the sand dunes along Lake Michigan in Kohler-Andrae State Park.

- Location within Wisconsin Location within the United States
- Interactive map of Kohler-Andrae State Park
- Location: Sheboygan County, Wisconsin, United States
- Coordinates: 43°39′46″N 87°43′18″W
- Area: 988 acres (400 ha)
- Established: 1928 (Andrae); 1966 (Kohler)
- Administrator: Wisconsin Department of Natural Resources
- Website: Official website
- Wisconsin State Parks

Kohler-Andrae State Park comprises two adjacent Wisconsin state parks located in the Town of Wilson, a few miles south of the city of Sheboygan. They are managed as one unit. Terry Andrae State Park, established in 1927, and John Michael Kohler State Park, established in 1966, total 988 acres (4.00 km^{2}). The parks contain over two miles (3 km) of beaches and sand dunes along the shore of Lake Michigan, with woods and wetlands away from the water. The Black River flows through the parks.

The park protects threatened plants.

== History ==
The land which is now Terry Andrae State Park is sandy, so it could not be used by early European immigrants for growing crops or grazing cattle. Frank Theodore (Terry) Andrae was the president of Milwaukee's Julius Andrae and Sons' Electric Supply Company. He purchased 92 acres (37 ha) in 1924 from a retired fisherman and later added another 30 acres (12 ha). He built a two-story house which overlooked Lake Michigan in the present campgrounds. This, their second house, was used to entertain guests. Mrs. Andrae hired forestry consultants to reforest their property. After Mr. Andrae died in 1927, Elsbeth Andrae donated the 122 acres (49 ha) to the State of Wisconsin in memory of her husband Terry. Terry Andrae State Park opened in 1928.

In April 1966, Kohler Company donated 280 acres (110 ha) immediately north of Terry Andrae State Park to the state of Wisconsin. It was named Kohler-Andrae State Park.

The 402 acres (163 ha) were expanded to almost 1,000 acres (4.0 km^{2}) by acquisitions of neighboring properties. Although the two units are considered separate adjacent properties, they are managed as a single unit by the Wisconsin Department of Natural Resources. A citizen's support group called Friends of Kohler-Andrae State Park was formed in 1987 to raise funds which are used for nature programming and development projects such as a handicap-accessible cabin.

Directly north of the state park, the Kohler company has proposed to clear as much as 200 acres of forest, which may affect as much as 80 acres of protected wetlands, in order to construct an 18-hole golf course along the shore of Lake Michigan. Challenges from state residents and environmental activists have caused the proposal to be delayed and modified because of concerns over the fragility of the neighboring ecosystems.

== Amenities ==
Activities related to Lake Michigan include fishing, boating, and swimming. There are no boat launching ramps or docks at the park. The lake contains dozens of species of fish including trout and salmon. Inland activities include hiking and biking. The park is open all year. Park facilities include campgrounds, roads, and trails. The park has a 137-unit family campground and two group campsites. Winter activities include cross-country skiing and snowshoeing.

== Trails ==
The park contains nature trails and hiking trails. The Creeping Juniper Nature Trail is a half mile long trail on a cordwalk through the rolling sand dunes by Sanderling Nature Center. The Woodland Dunes Trail is a one-mile (1.6 km) trail through forested rolling dunes. It contains interpretive signs to identify and describe trees. It is accessed by the campgrounds. The Dunes Cordwalk has a half mile north and 1.5-mile (2.4 km) south portions on a wooden cordwalk through rolling dunes parallel to Lake Michigan. The Black River Trail is a 2.5-mile (4.0 km) long grass trail at the northwest section of the park. It is accessed north of the park on County Highway V. It passes through open fields, woodlands, and evergreen forests. Horses and mountain bikes are allowed on the trail. Black River Marsh Boardwalk is a quarter mile boardwalk through a wetland. It is accessed near site 48.

== Sanderling Nature Center ==
The Sanderling Nature Center is located in the northern area of the park. Exhibits focus on the plants and animals found in the park, the natural history of the Great Lakes, and the park's history. The center is open from May through October featuring park displays, an auditorium and an observation deck with a view of Lake Michigan.

== Gallery ==
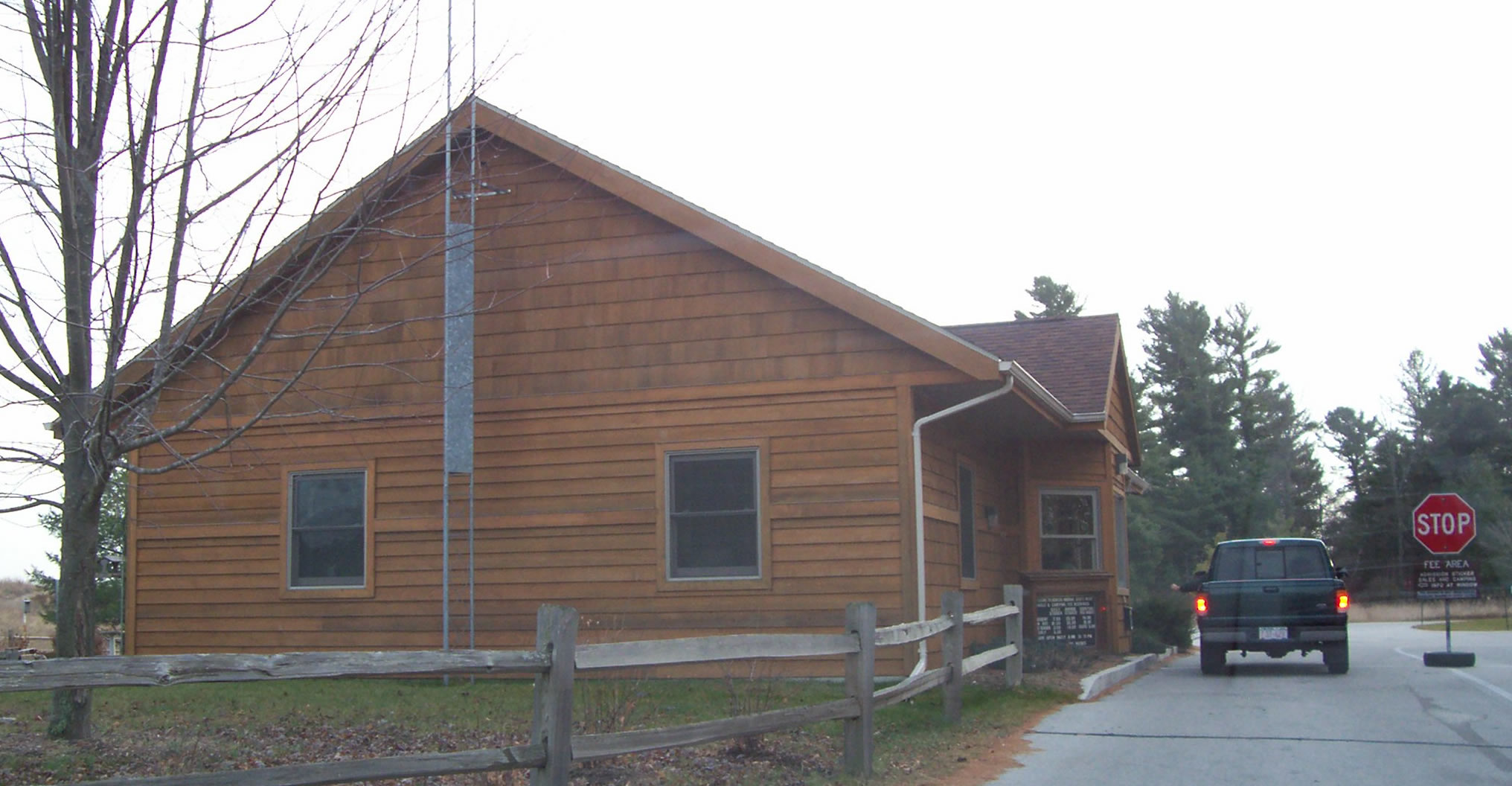
Ranger station

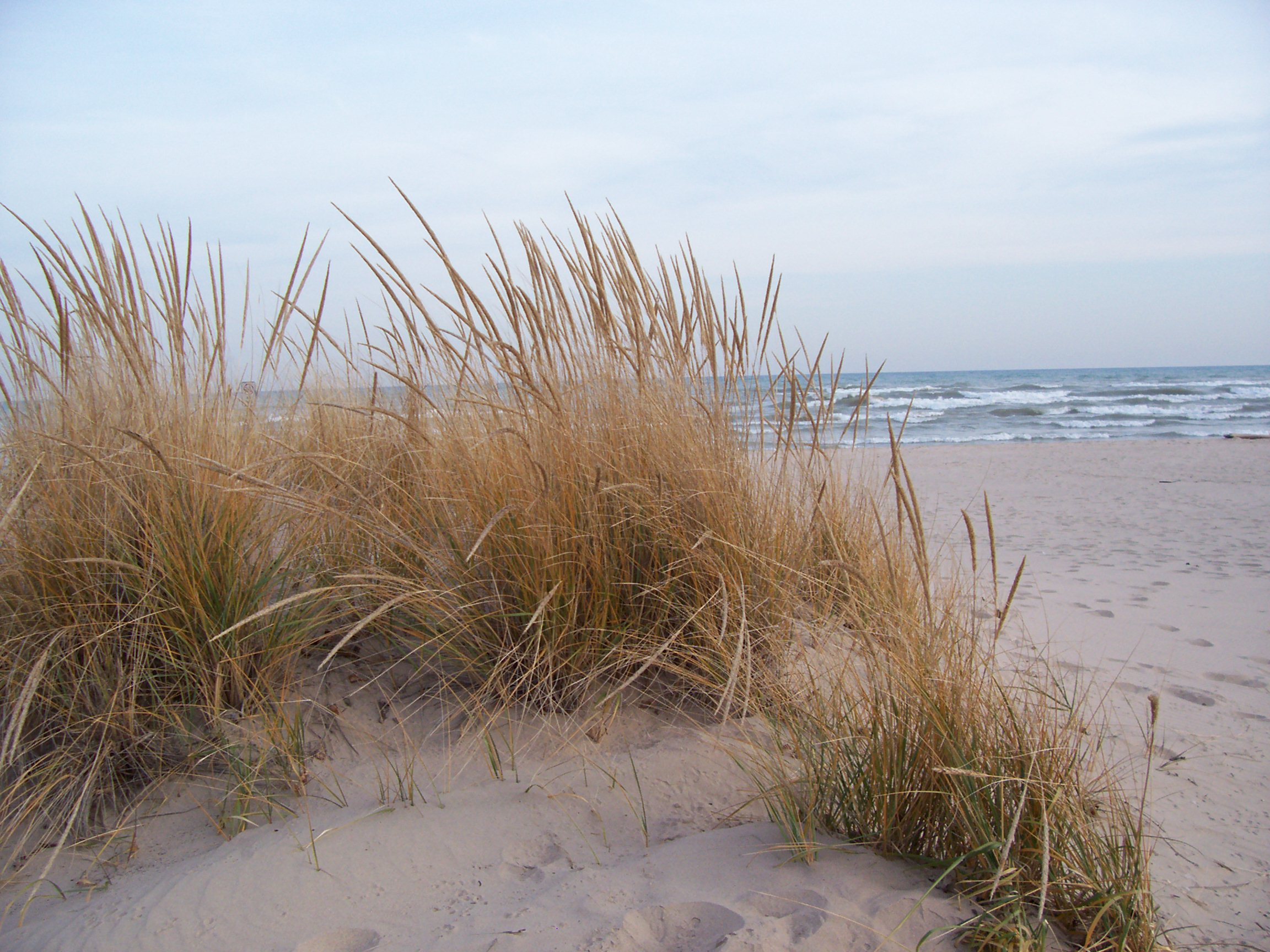
American Marram Grass dunes with Lake Michigan in background

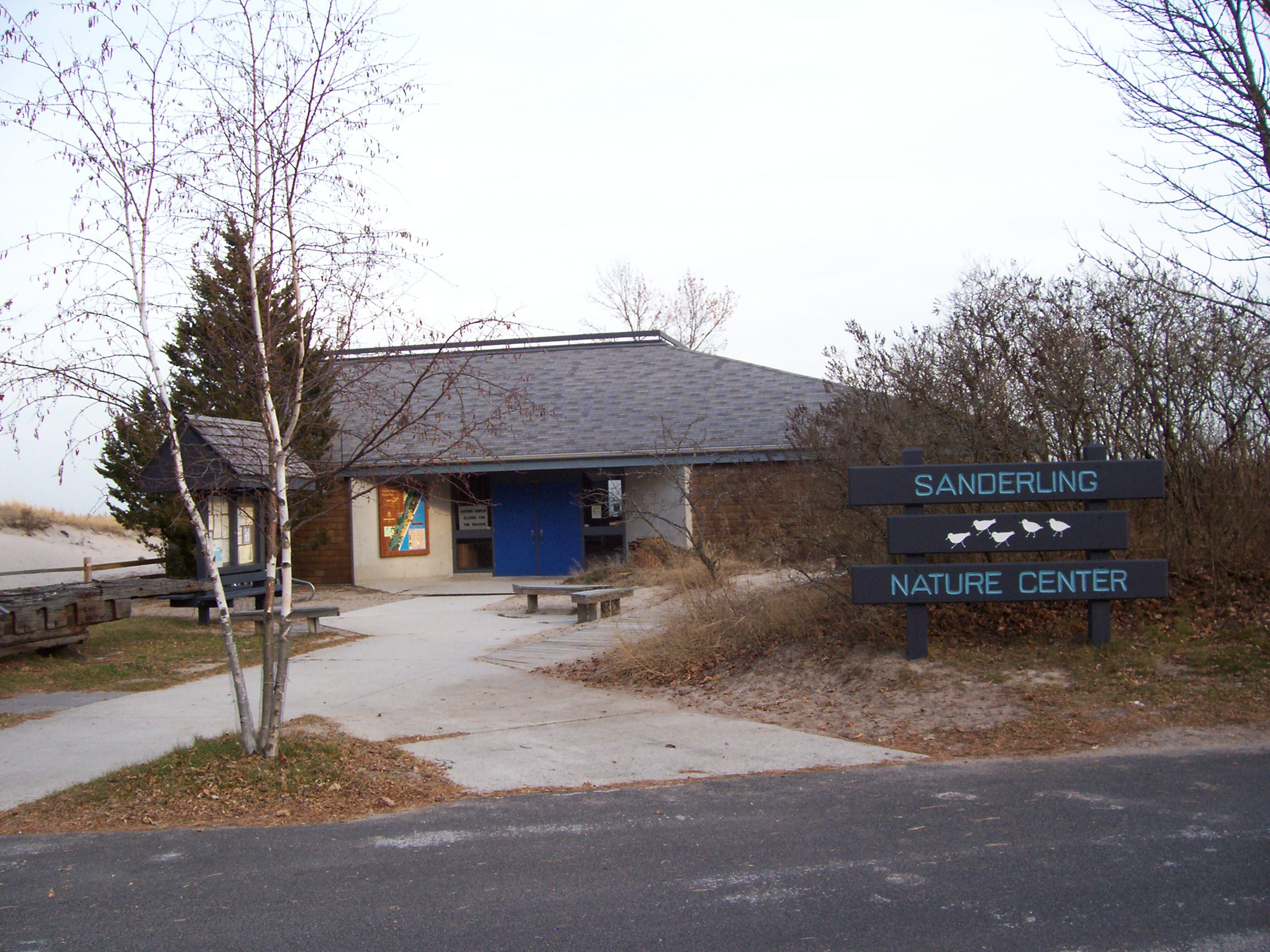
Sanderling Nature Center

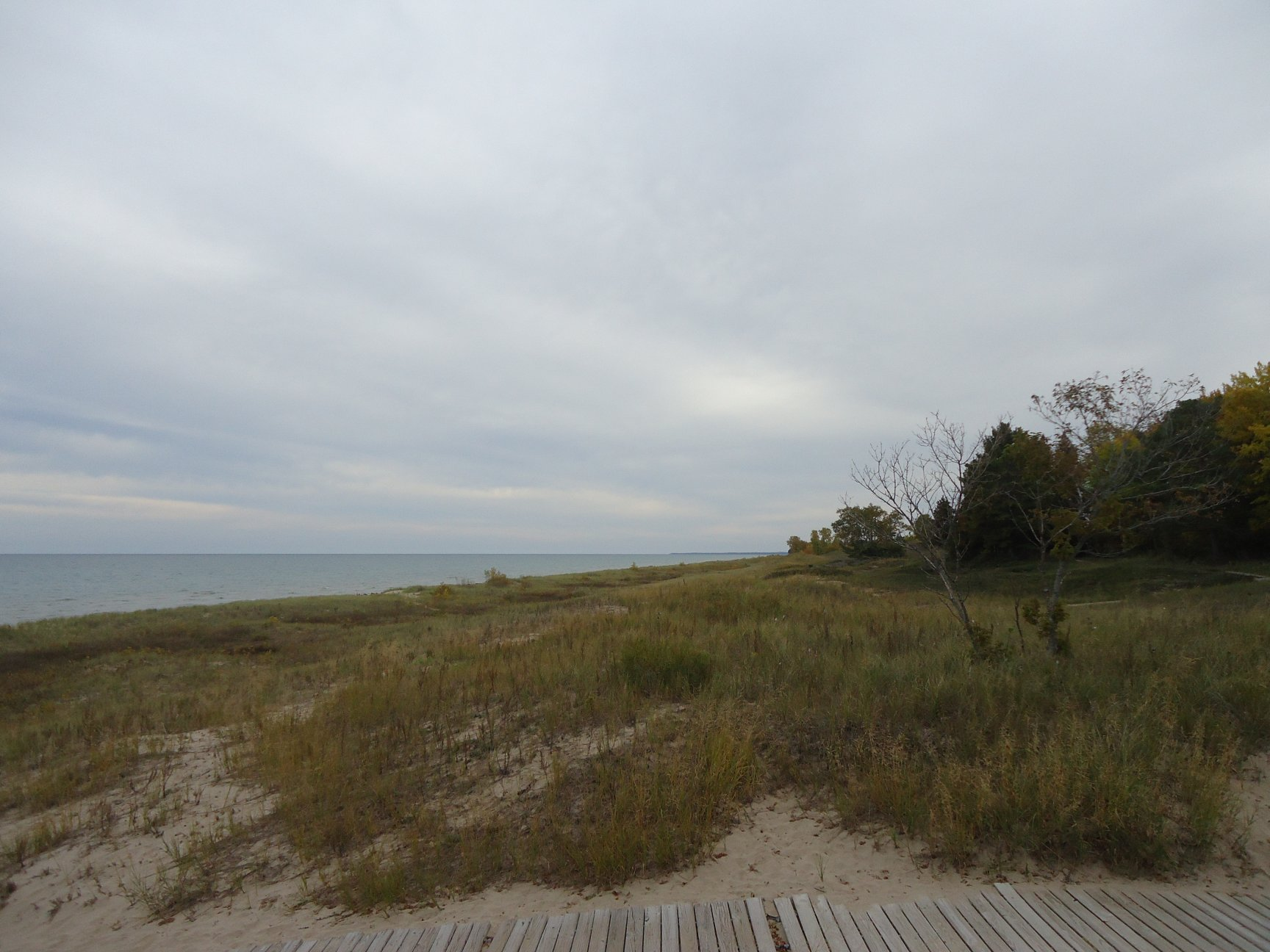
View of Lake Michigan and shore from boardwalk
