= Little Hog Island (Michigan) =

Island in Michigan, United States

- Location within Michigan Location within the United States

Geography
- Location: Lake Michigan
- Coordinates: 46.0700029°N 85.2903623°W
- Area: 1.3 acres (0.53 ha)
- Highest elevation: 591 ft (180.1 m)

Administration
- United States
- State: Michigan
- County: Mackinac County
- Township: Hudson Township

Little Hog Island is an island located in Lake Michigan, is positioned about zero point two five miles (0.40 km) from Hog Island Point on the Michigan's Upper Peninsula. The island is within Hudson Township, Mackinac County, in the U.S. state of Michigan. It is 1.3 acres (0.53 ha) in size and is privately owned.
