= George W. Weeden =

American politician

George W. Weeden was an American politician who served in the Wisconsin State Assembly and for whom Weedens, Wisconsin, was named.

== Biography ==
Weeden was born on September 7, 1822, in Hampton, New York. He later settled in Wilson, Sheboygan County, Wisconsin.

== Career ==
Weeden was a member of the Assembly during the 1872 and 1883 sessions. Other positions he held include chairman of the Sheboygan County Board of Supervisors, county judge and county treasurer of Sheboygan County, Wisconsin.

Weedens was also an unsuccessful candidate for county treasurer in 1870. He was a Democrat.
