= Lake Michigan =

One of the Great Lakes of North America

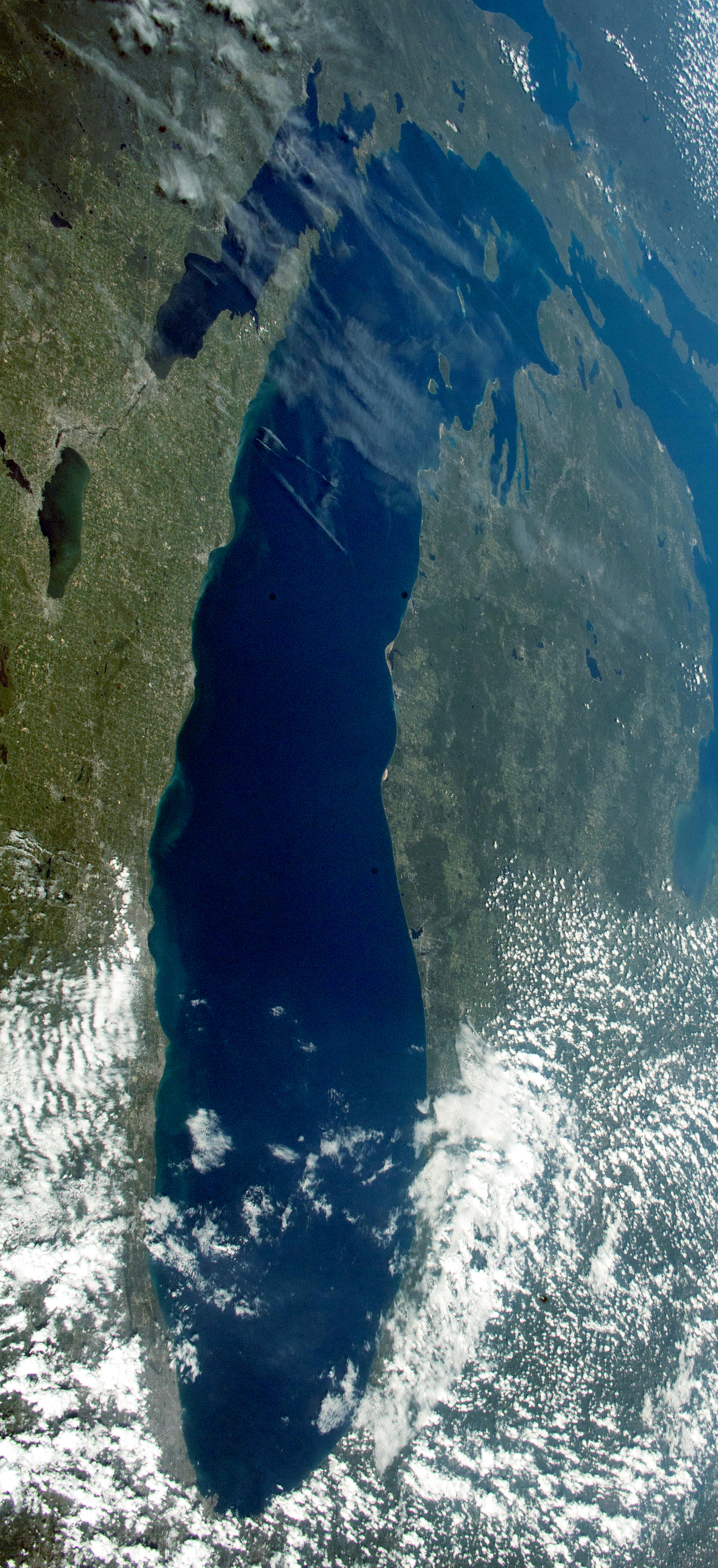
- Lake Michigan viewed from the International Space Station (August 19, 2019). Chicago sits at the extreme S.W. of the lake.

- Location within North America
- Interactive map of Lake Michigan
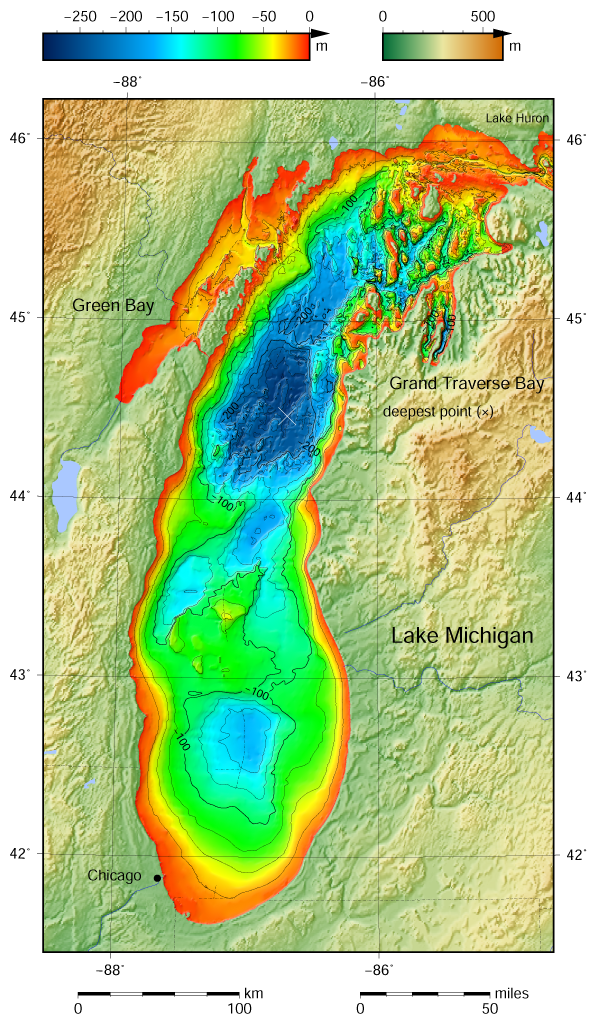
- Lake Michigan bathymetric map. The deepest point is marked with "×".
- Location: United States
- Group: Great Lakes
- Coordinates: 44°N 87°W
- Lake type: Glacial
- Primary inflows: Straits of Mackinac, Fox River, Grand River, Menominee River, Milwaukee River, Muskegon River, Kalamazoo River, St. Joseph River
- Primary outflows: Straits of Mackinac; also, controlled discharge through locks on the Chicago River (and its North Shore Channel), and Calumet River
- Basin countries: United States
- Max. length: 307 mi (494 km)
- Max. width: 118 mi (190 km)
- Min. width: 91 mi (146 km)
- Surface area: 22,300 square miles (57,757 km^{2})
- Average depth: 279 ft (85 m)
- Max. depth: 923 ft (281 m)
- Water volume: 1,183 cu mi (4,930 km^{3})
- Residence time: 99 years
- Shore length^{1}: 1,400 mi (2,300 km) plus 238 mi (383 km) for islands
- Surface elevation: 577 ft (176 m)
- Islands: see list
- Settlements: see list
- ^{1} Shore length is not a well-defined measure.

Lake Michigan (/ˈmɪʃɪɡən/ MISH-ig-ən) is one of the five Great Lakes of North America. It is the second-largest of the Great Lakes by volume (1,180 cu mi; 4,900 km^{3}) and depth (923 ft; 281 m) after Lake Superior and the third-largest by surface area (22,300 square miles; 57,757 km^{2}), after Lake Superior and Lake Huron. To the east, its basin is conjoined with that of Lake Huron through the wide and deep Straits of Mackinac, giving it the same surface elevation as its eastern counterpart; hydrologically, the two bodies are a single lake that is, by area, the largest freshwater lake in the world.

Lake Michigan is the only Great Lake located fully in the United States; the other four are shared between the U.S. and Canada. It is the world's largest lake, by area, located fully in one country, and is shared, from west to east, by the U.S. states of Wisconsin, Illinois, Indiana, and Michigan. Ports along its shores include Chicago, Illinois; Gary, Indiana; Milwaukee and Green Bay, Wisconsin; and Muskegon, Michigan. To the north, the lake is flanked by long bays, including Green Bay in the northwest, and Grand Traverse and Little Traverse bays in the northeast. The word michigan is believed to come from the Ojibwe ᒥᓯᑲᒥ (michi-gami or mishigami), meaning "great water".

== History ==
Some of the most well-studied early human inhabitants of the Lake Michigan region were the Hopewell Native Americans. Their culture declined after 800 AD, when, for the following few hundred years, the region was the home of peoples known as the Late Woodland Native Americans. In the early 17th century, when Western European explorers made their first forays into the region, they encountered descendants of the Late Woodland Native Americans, mainly the historic Ojibwe, Menominee, Noquet, Sauk, Meskwaki, Ho-Chunk, Miami, Odawa and Potawatomi peoples. The French explorer Jean Nicolet is believed to have been the first European to reach Lake Michigan, possibly in 1634 or 1638. In the earliest European maps of the region, the name of Lake Illinois has been found (named for the Illinois Confederation of tribes), in addition to that of "Michigan". During the 1640s and 1650s, the Beaver Wars (over the fur trade with the European colonies), initiated by the Iroquois, forced a massive demographic-shift, as their western neighbors fled the violence. The Iroquois sought refuge to the west and north of Lake Michigan.

The Straits of Mackinac were an important Native American travel corridor and fur-trade route. Located on the southern side of the straits sits the town of Mackinaw City, Michigan, the site of Fort Michilimackinac (a reconstructed French fort founded in 1715); on the northern side is St. Ignace, Michigan, site of a French Catholic mission to the Indians (founded in 1671). In 1673, Jacques Marquette, Louis Jolliet, and their crew of five Métis voyageurs followed Lake Michigan to Green Bay and up the Fox River, nearly to its headwaters, in their search for the Mississippi River. By the late 18th century, the eastern portions of the straits were controlled by Fort Mackinac on Mackinac Island, a British colonial and early American military base and fur trade center, founded in 1781.

With the advent of European exploration into the area in the late 17th century, Lake Michigan became used as part of a line of waterways leading from the Saint Lawrence River to the Mississippi River and thence to the Gulf of Mexico. French coureurs des bois and voyageurs established small ports and trading communities, such as Green Bay, on the lake during the late 17th and early 18th centuries. In the 19th century, Lake Michigan was integral to the development of Chicago and the Midwestern United States west of the lake. For example, 90% of the grain shipped from Chicago traveled by ships east over Lake Michigan during the antebellum years. The volume rarely fell below 50% after the Civil War even with the major expansion of railroad shipping.

The first person to reach the deep bottom of Lake Michigan was J. Val Klump, a scientist at the University of Wisconsin–Milwaukee in 1985. Klump reached the bottom via submersible as part of a research expedition. The warming of Lake Michigan was the subject of a 2018 report by Purdue University. In each decade since 1980, steady increases in obscure surface temperature have occurred. This is likely to lead to decreasing native habitat and to adversely affect native species survival, including game fish.

== Hydrology ==
The Milwaukee Reef, running under Lake Michigan from a point between Milwaukee and Racine to a point between Grand Haven and Muskegon, divides the lake into northern and southern basins. Each basin has a clockwise flow of water, deriving from rivers and winds. Prevailing westerly winds tend to move the surface water toward the east, producing a moderating effect on the climate of western Michigan. There is a mean difference in summer water temperatures of 5 to 10 degrees Fahrenheit (2 to 5 degrees Celsius) between the Wisconsin and Michigan shores.

Hydrologically Michigan and Huron are the same body of water (sometimes called Lake Michigan-Huron) but are normally considered distinct. Counted together, it is the largest body of fresh water in the world by surface area. The Mackinac Bridge is generally considered the dividing line between them. The main inflow to Lake Michigan from Lake Superior, through Lake Huron, is controlled by the locks operated by the bi-national Lake Superior Board of Control.

=== Statistics ===
Map of Great Lakes (Lake Michigan in darker blue)

Lake Michigan is the only Great Lake that is wholly within the borders of the United States; the others are shared with Canada. Lake Michigan has a surface area of 22,404 mi^{2} (58,030 km^{2}); (13,237 square miles (34,280 km^{2}) lying in Michigan, 7,358 square miles (19,060 km^{2}) in Wisconsin, 234 square miles (610 km^{2}) in Indiana, & 1,576 square miles (4,080 km^{2}) in Illinois) making it the largest lake entirely within one country by surface area (Lake Baikal in Russia is larger by water volume) and the fifth-largest lake in the world.

It is the larger half of Lake Michigan–Huron, which is the largest body of fresh water in the world by surface area. It is 307 miles (494 km) long by 118 miles (190 km) wide with a shoreline 1,640 miles (2,640 km) long. The lake's average depth is 46 fathoms 3 feet (279 ft; 85 m), while its greatest depth is 153 fathoms 5 feet (923 ft; 281 m). It contains a volume of 1,183 cubic miles (4,932 km^{3}) of water. Green Bay in the northwest is its largest bay. Grand Traverse Bay in its northeast is another large bay. Lake Michigan's deepest region, which lies in its northern half, is called Chippewa Basin (named after prehistoric Lake Chippewa) and is separated from South Chippewa Basin by a relatively shallower area called the Mid Lake Plateau.

=== Islands ===
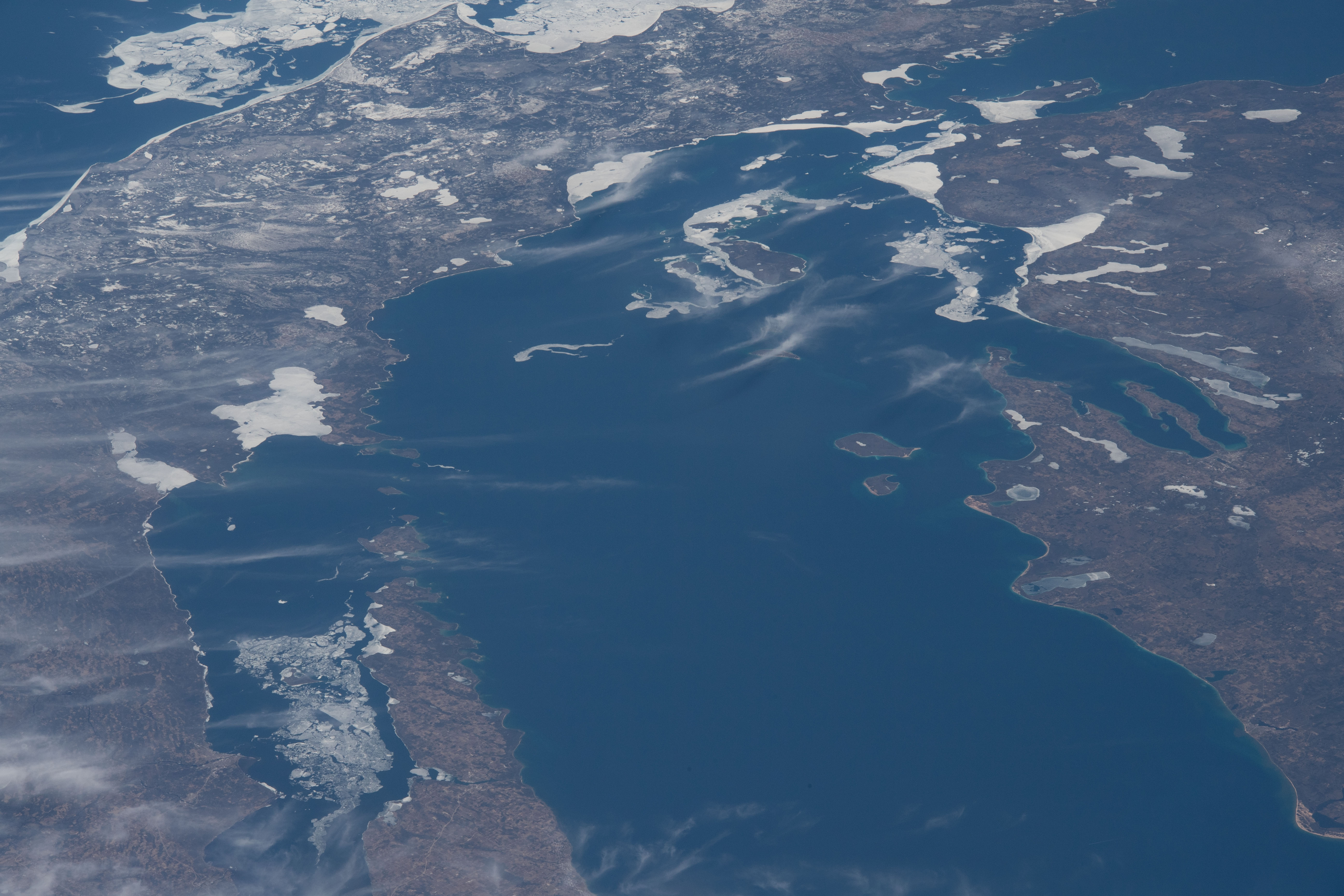
Most islands in Lake Michigan are in the northern part of the lake. Photo taken from the International Space Station on April 10, 2022.

- At 55.8 mi^{2} (145 km^{2}), Beaver Island is the largest island in Lake Michigan; it is the namesake of an archipelago in Charlevoix County, Michigan, which includes Garden Island, Grape Island, Gull Island, Hat Island, High Island, Hog Island, Horseshoe Island, Little Island, Pismire Island, Shoe Island, Ojibwa Island, Trout Island, and Whiskey Island. Fisherman's Island is also found in Charlevoix County.
- The Fox Islands in Leelanau County, Michigan, consist of North Fox Island and South Fox Island.
- The Manitou Islands in Leelanau County, Michigan, consist of North Manitou Island and South Manitou Island.
- Islands within Grand Traverse Bay include Bassett Island, Bellow Island, and Power Island.
- Islands south of the Garden Peninsula in Delta County, Michigan include Gravelly Island, Gull Island, Little Gull Island, Little Summer Island, Poverty Island, Rocky Island, St. Martin Island, and Summer Island.
- Islands in Big Bay de Noc in Delta County, Michigan include Round Island, St. Vital Island, and Snake Island.
- Islands in Little Bay de Noc in Delta County, Michigan include Butlers Island and Sand Island.
- Wilderness State Park in Emmet County, Michigan contains Temperance Island and Waugoshance Island. Ile Aux Galets is also found in Emmet County.
- Epoufette Island, Gravel Island, Little Hog Island, and Naubinway Island are located in Mackinac County, Michigan, in the area of Epoufette, Michigan and Naubinway, Michigan.
- Green Island and St. Helena Island are in the vicinity of the Mackinac Bridge, in Mackinac County, Michigan.
- Islands surrounding the Door Peninsula in Wisconsin include Chambers Island, Fish Island, Gravel Island, Spider Island, Horseshoe Island, the Sister Islands, Detroit Island, Green Island, Hog Island, Pilot Island, Plum Island, Rock Island, the Strawberry Islands and Washington Island. The northern half of the peninsula is technically an island itself, due to the Sturgeon Bay Ship Canal.
- Northerly Island is a 91-acre (37 ha) human-made peninsula in Chicago. It is the home of the Adler Planetarium, the former site of Meigs Field, and the current site of the temporary concert venue Huntington Bank Pavilion each summer.

=== Connection to other water bodies ===
In the mid-20th century, construction of the Saint Lawrence Seaway and Great Lakes Waterway opened the Great Lakes to ocean-going vessels. The wider ocean-going container ships that were developed later do not fit through the locks on these routes, which limits shipping on the lakes. Lake freighters are used on the lakes that are too large to pass the locks and enter the ocean. Despite their vast size, large sections of the Great Lakes freeze in winter, interrupting most shipping. Some icebreakers ply the lakes.

Lake Michigan is connected by the Illinois Waterway to the Gulf of Mexico via the Illinois River and the Mississippi River. Commercial tug-and-barge traffic on these waterways is heavy. Pleasure boats can enter or exit the Great Lakes by way of the Erie Canal and Hudson River in New York. The Erie Canal connects to the Great Lakes at the east end of Lake Erie (at Buffalo, New York) and at the south side of Lake Ontario (at Oswego, New York).

=== Water level ===
The lake fluctuates from month to month with the highest lake levels typically occurring in summer. The normal high-water mark is 2.00 feet (60 cm) above datum (577.5 ft (180 m)). In October 1986, Lakes Michigan and Huron reached their highest level at 5.92 feet (1.80 m) above datum. The monthly average high-water records were broken for several months in a row in 2020.

Lake levels tend to be the lowest in winter. The normal low-water mark is 1.00 foot (30 cm) below datum (577.5 ft or 176.0 m). In the winter of 1964, Lakes Michigan and Huron reached their lowest level at 1.38 feet (42 cm) below datum. As with the high-water records, monthly low-water records were set each month from February 1964 through January 1965. During this twelve-month period, water levels ranged from 1.38 to 0.71 feet (42–22 cm) below Chart Datum. The all-time low-water mark was eclipsed in January 2013.

In January 2013, Lake Michigan's monthly mean water levels dipped to an all-time low of 576.2 ft (175.6 m), reaching their lowest since record keeping began in 1918. The lakes were 29 in (74 cm) below their long-term average and had declined 17 in (43 cm) since January 2012. Keith Kompoltowicz, chief of watershed hydrology for the U.S. Army Corps of Engineers' district office in Detroit, explained that biggest factors leading to the lower water levels in 2013 were a combination of the "lack of a large snowpack" in the winter of 2011/2012 coupled with very hot and dry conditions in the summer of 2012. Since then water levels rebounded, rising more than 6 feet (1.8 meters) to historical record high levels.

=== Drinking water ===
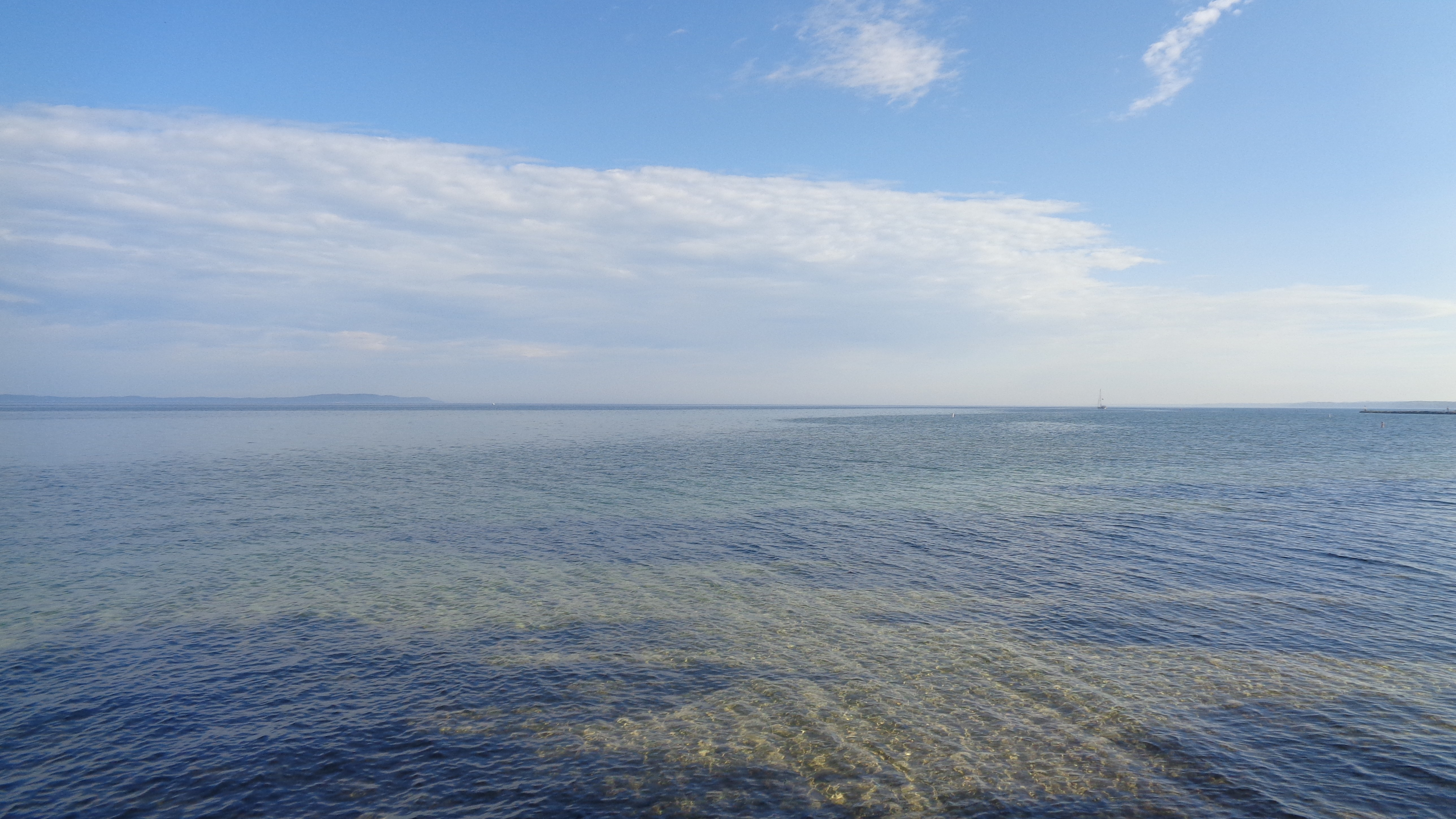
Grand Traverse Bay, a large bay of Lake Michigan in Michigan's Lower Peninsula, from the community of Elk Rapids

Lake Michigan, like the other Great Lakes, supplies drinking water to millions of people in bordering areas.

The Great Lakes are collectively administered by the Conference of Great Lakes and St. Lawrence Governors and Premiers, intergovernmental organization led by the governing chief executives of the Canadian provinces of Ontario and Québec, and by the governors of the U.S. states of Illinois, Indiana, Michigan, Minnesota, New York, Ohio, Pennsylvania, and Wisconsin. The Conference came into force, in December 2008, with the enactment of laws in all of the states and the two provinces, and the enactment of a United States federal law.

Environmental problems can still plague the lake. Steel mills and refineries operate near the Indiana shoreline. The Chicago Tribune reported that BP is a major polluter, dumping thousands of pounds of raw sludge into the lake every day from its Whiting, Indiana, oil refinery. In March 2014 BP's Whiting refinery was responsible for spilling more than 1,600 US gallons (6,100 L) of oil into the lake.

== Shoreline ==
=== Beaches ===
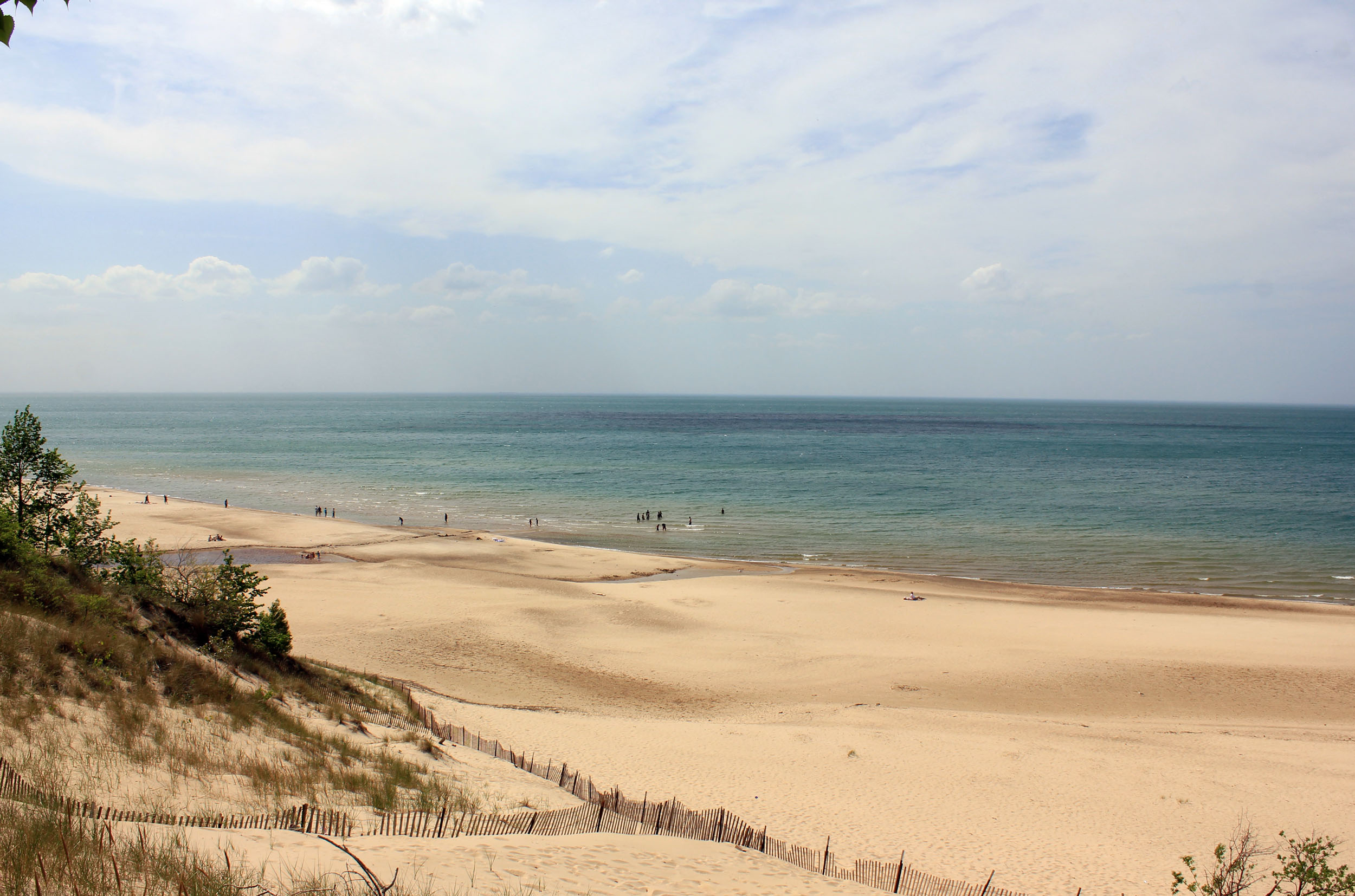
View of Lake Michigan from Indiana Dunes National Park

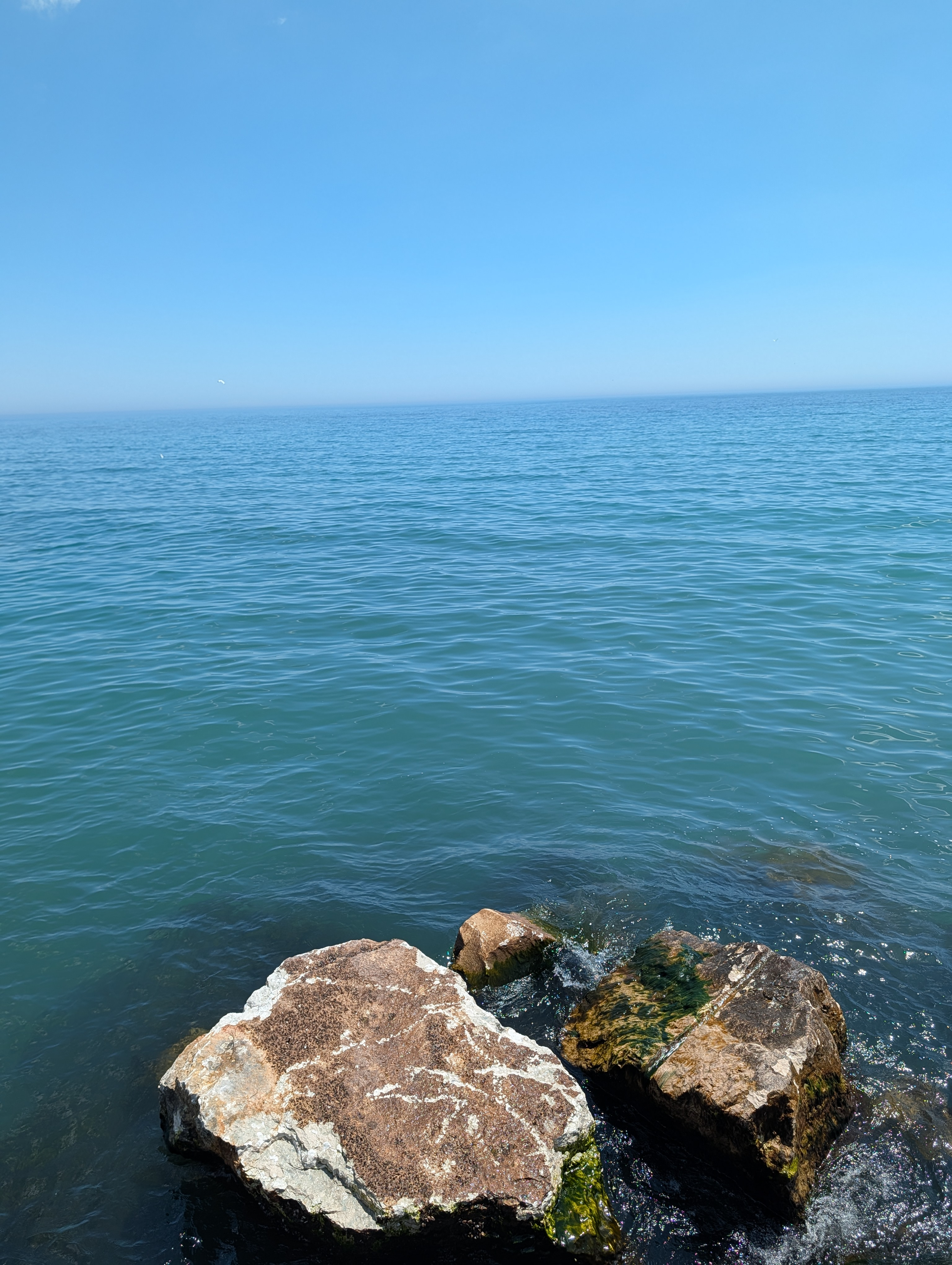
View of Lake Michigan from Crescent Beach, Wisconsin

Lake Michigan has many beaches. The region is often referred to as the "Third Coast" of the United States, after those of the Atlantic Ocean and the Pacific Ocean. The sand is often soft and off-white, known as "singing sands" because of the squeaking noise (caused by high quartz content) it emits when walked upon. Some beaches have sand dunes covered in green beach grass and sand cherries, and the water is usually clear and cool, between 55 and 80 °F (13 and 27 °C), even in the late summer months. However, because prevailing westerly winds tend to move the surface water toward the east, there is a flow of warmer water to the Michigan shore in the summer.

The sand dunes located on the east shore of Lake Michigan are the largest freshwater dune system in the world. In multiple locations along the shoreline, the dunes rise several hundred feet/meters above the lake surface. Large dune formations can be seen in many state parks, national forests and national parks along the Indiana and Michigan shoreline. Some of the most expansive and unique dune formations can be found at Indiana Dunes National Park, Saugatuck Dunes State Park, Warren Dunes State Park, Hoffmaster State Park, Silver Lake State Park, Ludington State Park, and Sleeping Bear Dunes National Lakeshore. Small dune formations can be found on the western shore of Lake Michigan at Illinois Beach State Park, and moderate-sized dune formations can be found in Kohler-Andrae State Park and Point Beach State Forest in Wisconsin. A large dune formation can be found in Whitefish Dunes State Park in Wisconsin in the Door Peninsula. Lake Michigan beaches in Northern Michigan are the only place in the world, aside from a few inland lakes in that region, where Petoskey stones, the Michigan state stone, can be found.

The beaches of the western coast and the northernmost part of the east coast are often rocky, with some sandy beaches. The southern and eastern beaches are typically sandy and dune-covered. This is partly because of the prevailing winds from the west (which also cause thick layers of ice to build on the eastern shore in winter). The Chicago city waterfront has been developed for parks, beaches, harbors and marinas, and residential developments connected by the Chicago Lakefront Trail. Where there are no beaches or marinas, stone or concrete revetments protect the shoreline from erosion. The Chicago lakefront is accessible for about 24 miles (39 km) between the city's southern and northern limits along the lake.

=== Cities ===
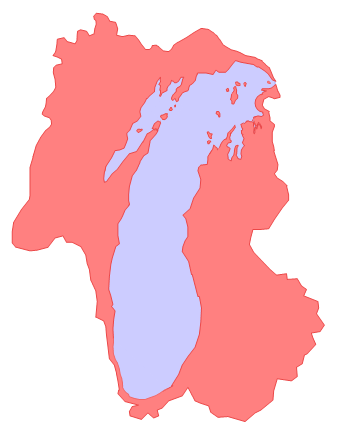
Lake Michigan basin

Twelve million people live along Lake Michigan's shores, mainly in the Chicago and Milwaukee metropolitan areas. The economy of many communities in northern Michigan and Door County, Wisconsin, is supported by tourism, with large seasonal populations attracted by Lake Michigan. Many seasonal residents have summer homes along the waterfront and return to other homes for the winter. The southern tip of the lake near Gary, Indiana, is heavily industrialized.

Cities on the shores of Lake Michigan include:

Illinois

- Chicago
- Evanston
- Wilmette
- Winnetka
- Kenilworth
- Glencoe
- Highland Park
- Lake Forest
- Lake Bluff
- Naval Station Great Lakes
- North Chicago
- Waukegan
- Beach Park
- Zion
- Winthrop Harbor

Indiana

- East Chicago
- Gary
- Hammond
- Michigan City
- Portage
- Porter
- Whiting

Michigan

- Benton Harbor
- Bridgman
- Charlevoix
- Douglas
- Elberta
- Escanaba
- Ferrysburg
- Frankfort
- Gladstone
- Glenn
- Grand Beach
- Grand Haven
- Harbor Springs
- Ludington
- Manistee
- Manistique
- Menominee
- Michiana
- Muskegon
- New Buffalo
- Norton Shores
- Pentwater
- Petoskey
- Saugatuck
- St. Joseph
- Shoreham
- South Haven
- Traverse City

Wisconsin

- Algoma
- Bay View
- Cudahy
- Fox Point
- Green Bay
- Kenosha
- Kewaunee
- Manitowoc
- Marinette
- Milwaukee
- Mequon
- Oconto
- Port Washington
- Racine
- Saint Francis
- Sheboygan
- Shorewood
- South Milwaukee
- Sturgeon Bay
- Two Rivers
- Whitefish Bay
- Waterford
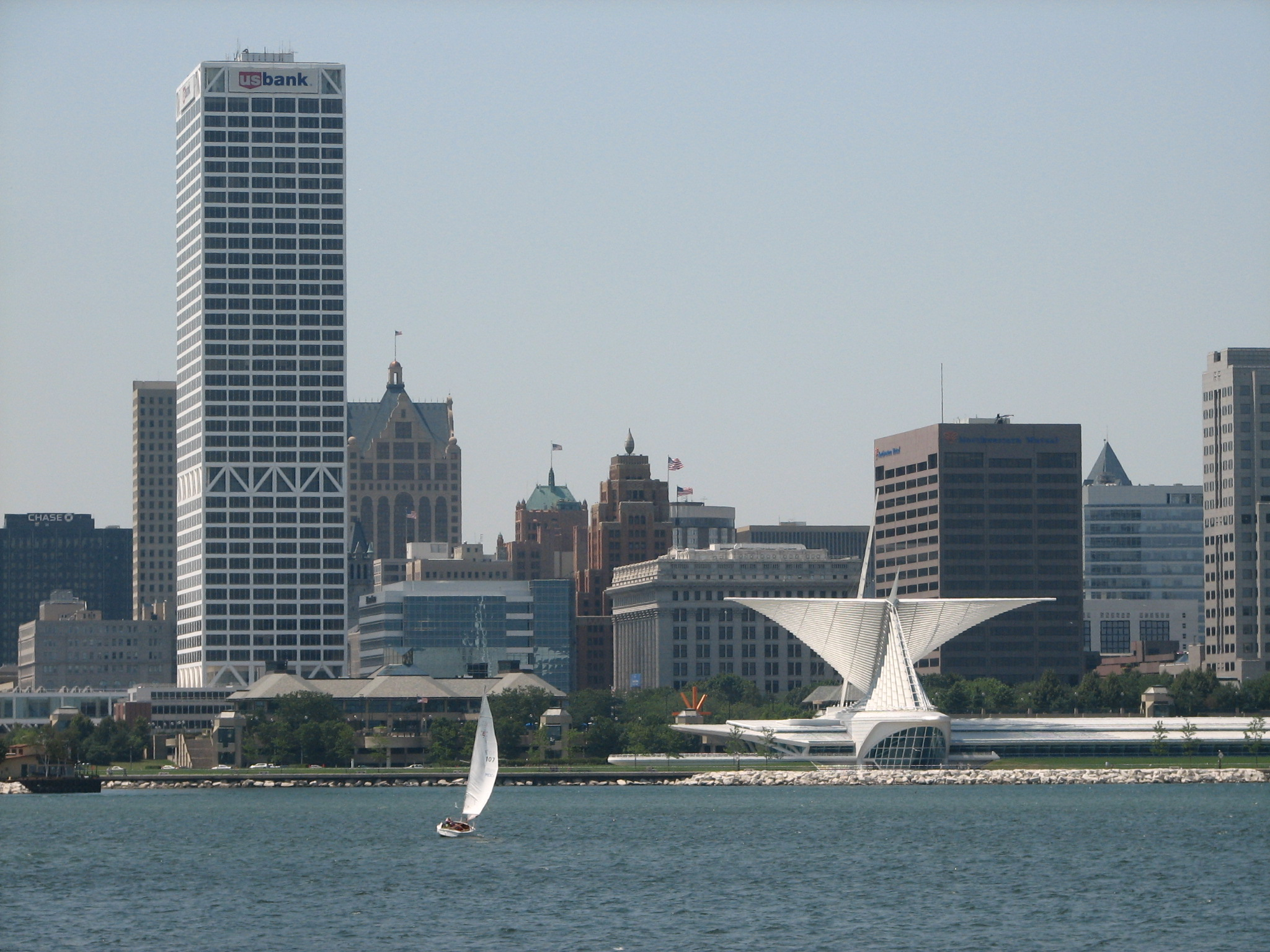
The Milwaukee lakefront

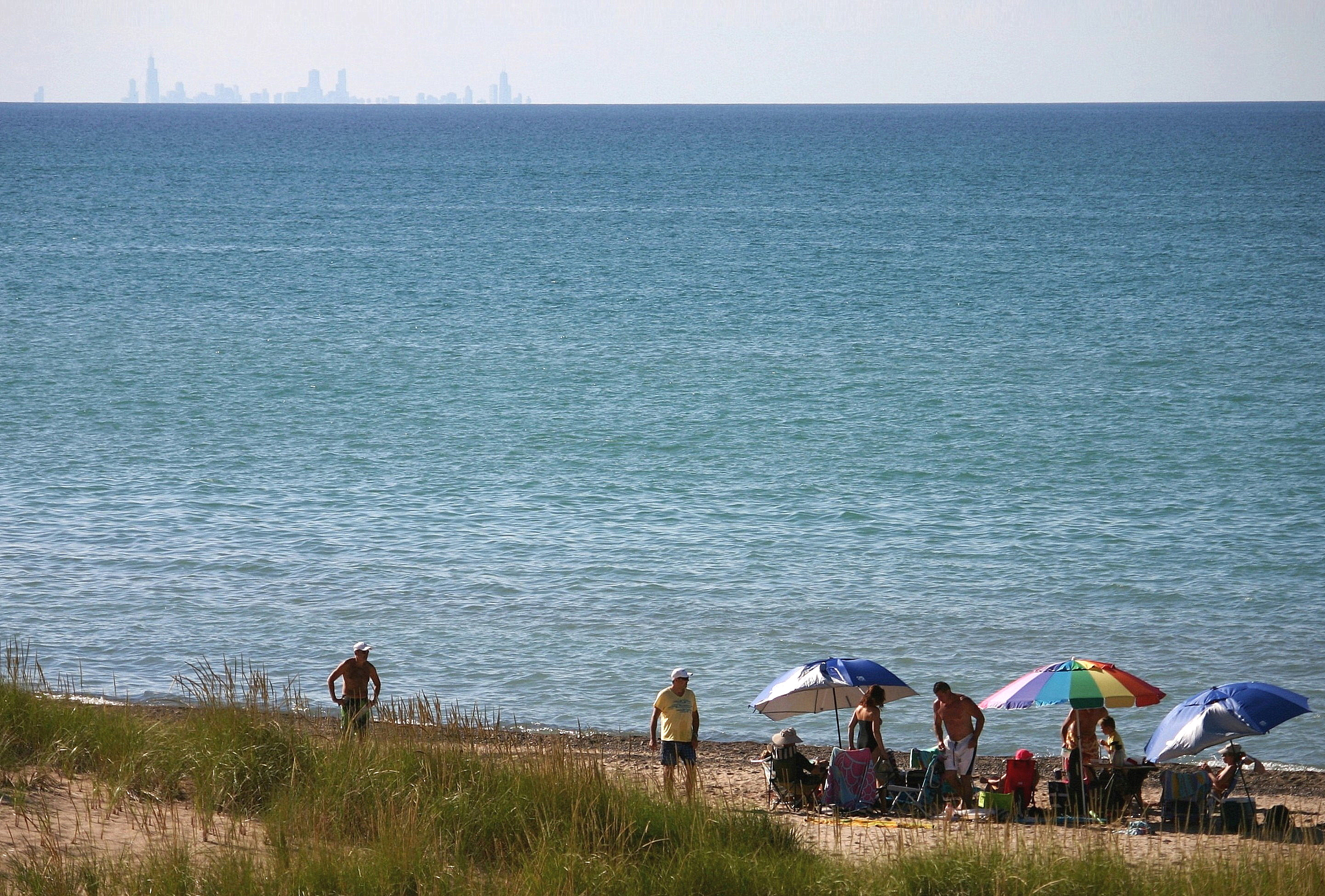
Silhouette of Chicago at the horizon

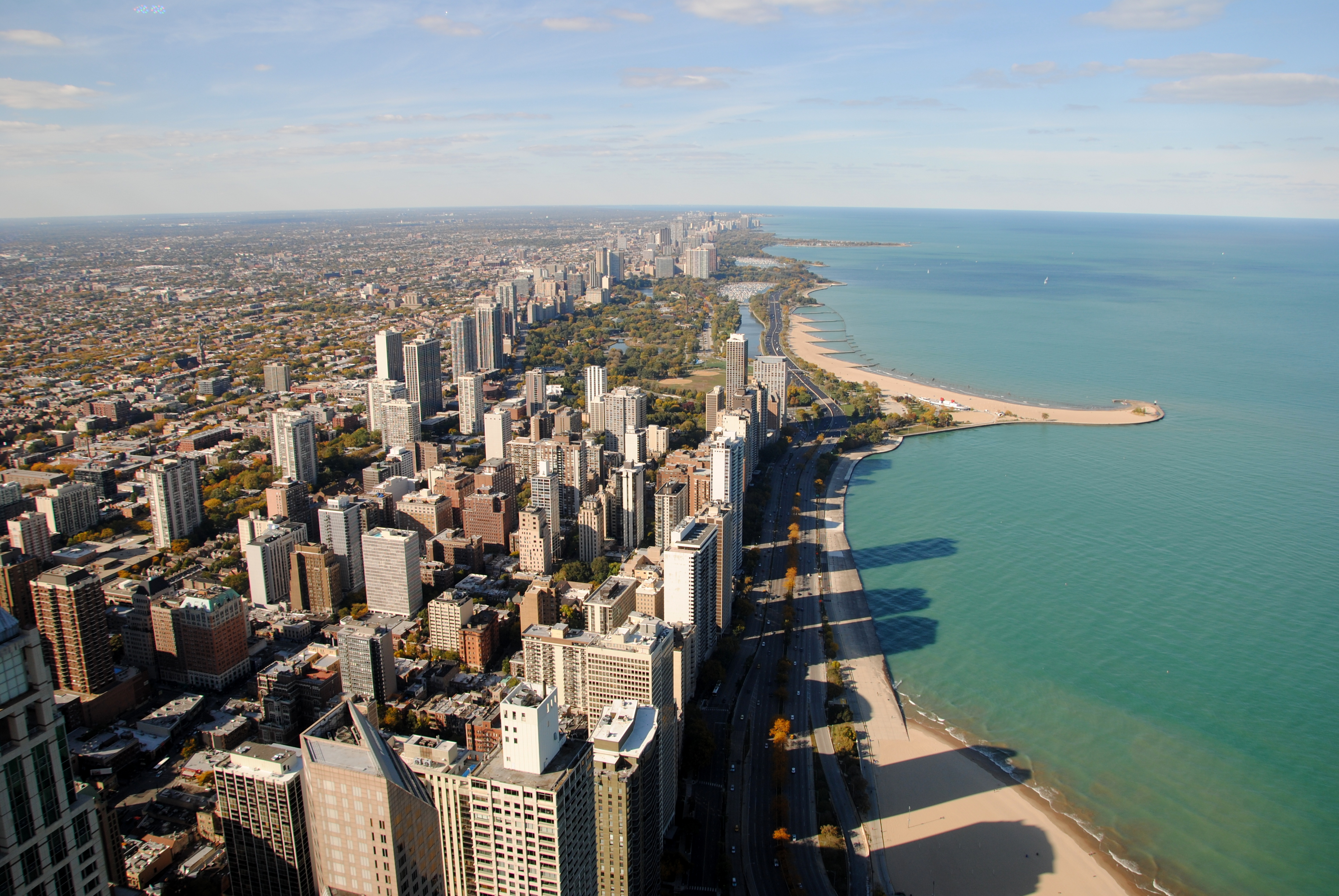
Chicago's Oak Street Beach

=== Parks ===
The National Park Service maintains the Sleeping Bear Dunes National Lakeshore and Indiana Dunes National Park. Parts of the shoreline are within the Hiawatha National Forest and the Manistee National Forest. The Manistee National Forest section of the shoreline includes the Nordhouse Dunes Wilderness. The Lake Michigan division of the Michigan Islands National Wildlife Refuge is also within the lake, as are the Green Bay National Wildlife Refuge and the Wisconsin Shipwreck Coast National Marine Sanctuary.

There are numerous state and local parks located on the shores of the lake or on islands within the lake:

- Chicago Park District Beaches
- Duck Lake State Park
- Fayette Historic State Park
- Fisherman's Island State Park
- Grand Haven State Park
- Grand Mere State Park
- Harrington Beach State Park
- Holland State Park
- Hoffmaster State Park
- Illinois Beach State Park
- Indian Lake State Park
- Indiana Dunes State Park
- Kohler-Andrae State Park
- Lake Park, Milwaukee
- Ludington State Park
- Leelanau State Park
- Mears State Park
- Muskegon State Park
- Newport State Park
- Orchard Beach State Park
- Peninsula State Park
- Pere Marquette Beach
- Potawatomi State Park
- Racine Zoo
- Rock Island State Park
- Saugatuck Dunes State Park
- Shingleton Management Unit within the Lake Superior State Forest
- Silver Lake State Park
- Traverse City State Park
- Terry Andrae State Park
- Van Buren State Park
- Warren Dunes State Park
- Wells State Park
- Whitefish Dunes State Park
- Wilderness State Park
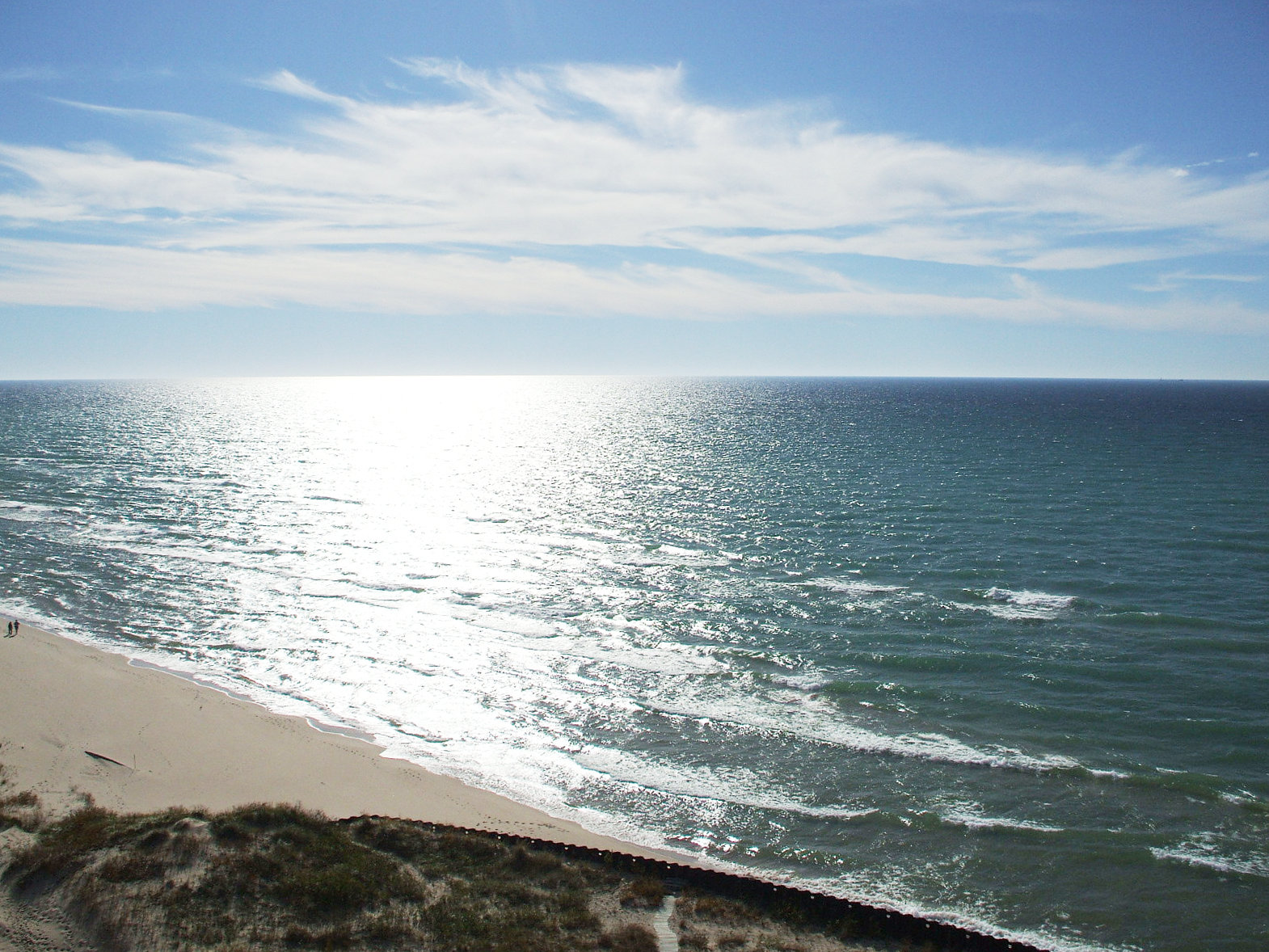
Big Sable Point, Michigan in Ludington State Park

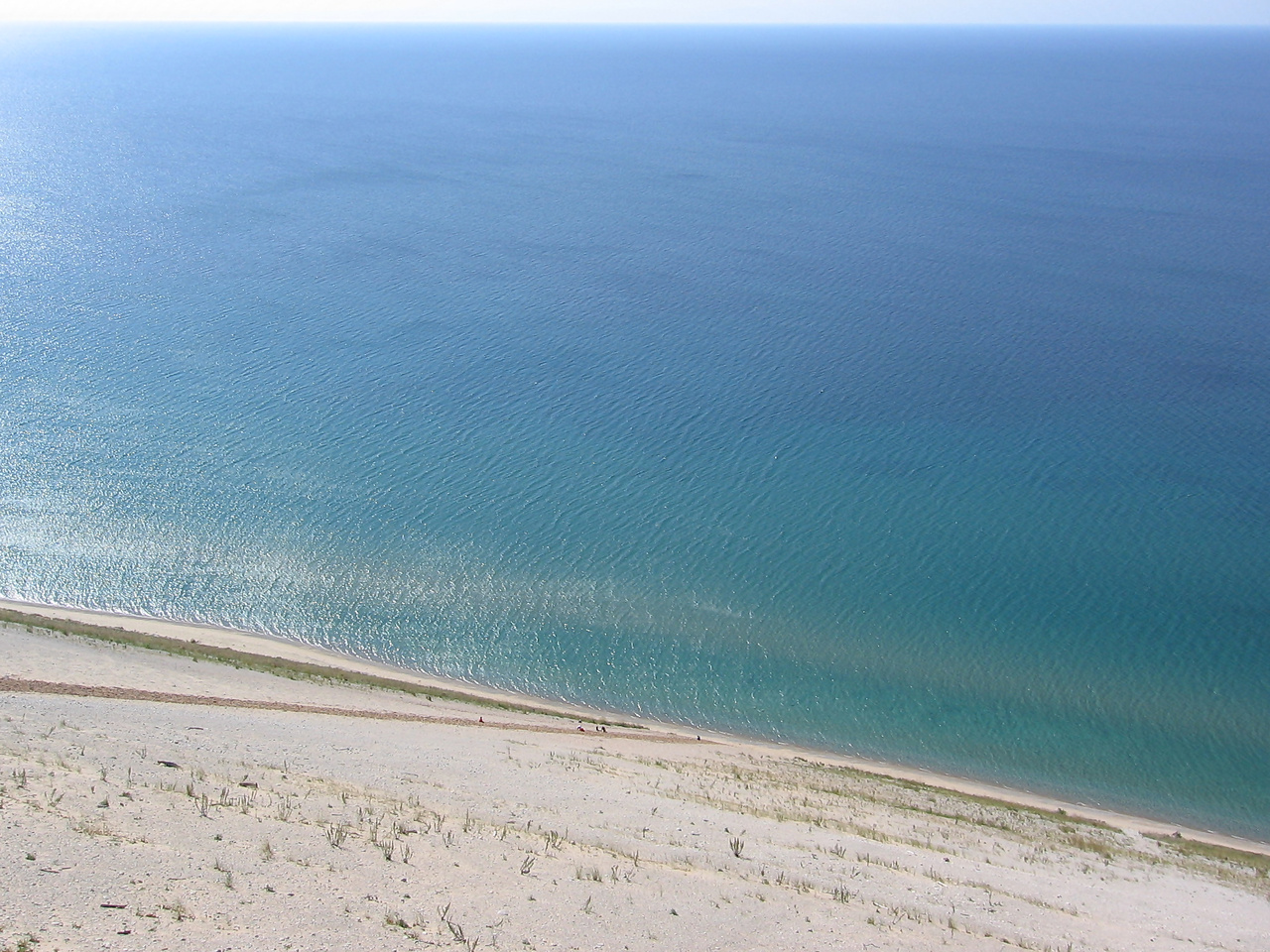
Lake view from the Sleeping Bear Dunes National Lakeshore, with people climbing uphill

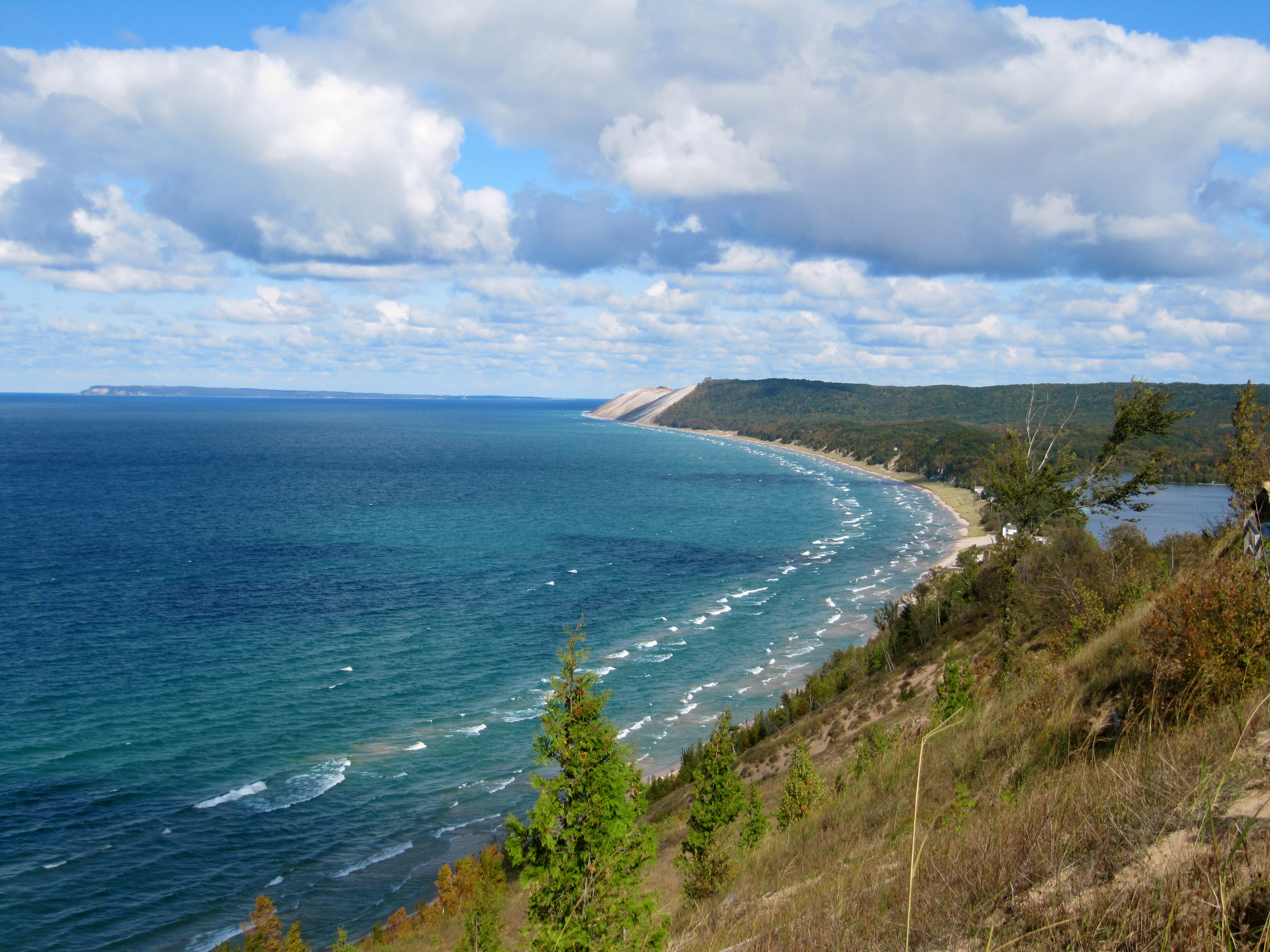
Sleeping Bear Dunes from the Empire Bluffs Trail near Empire, Michigan

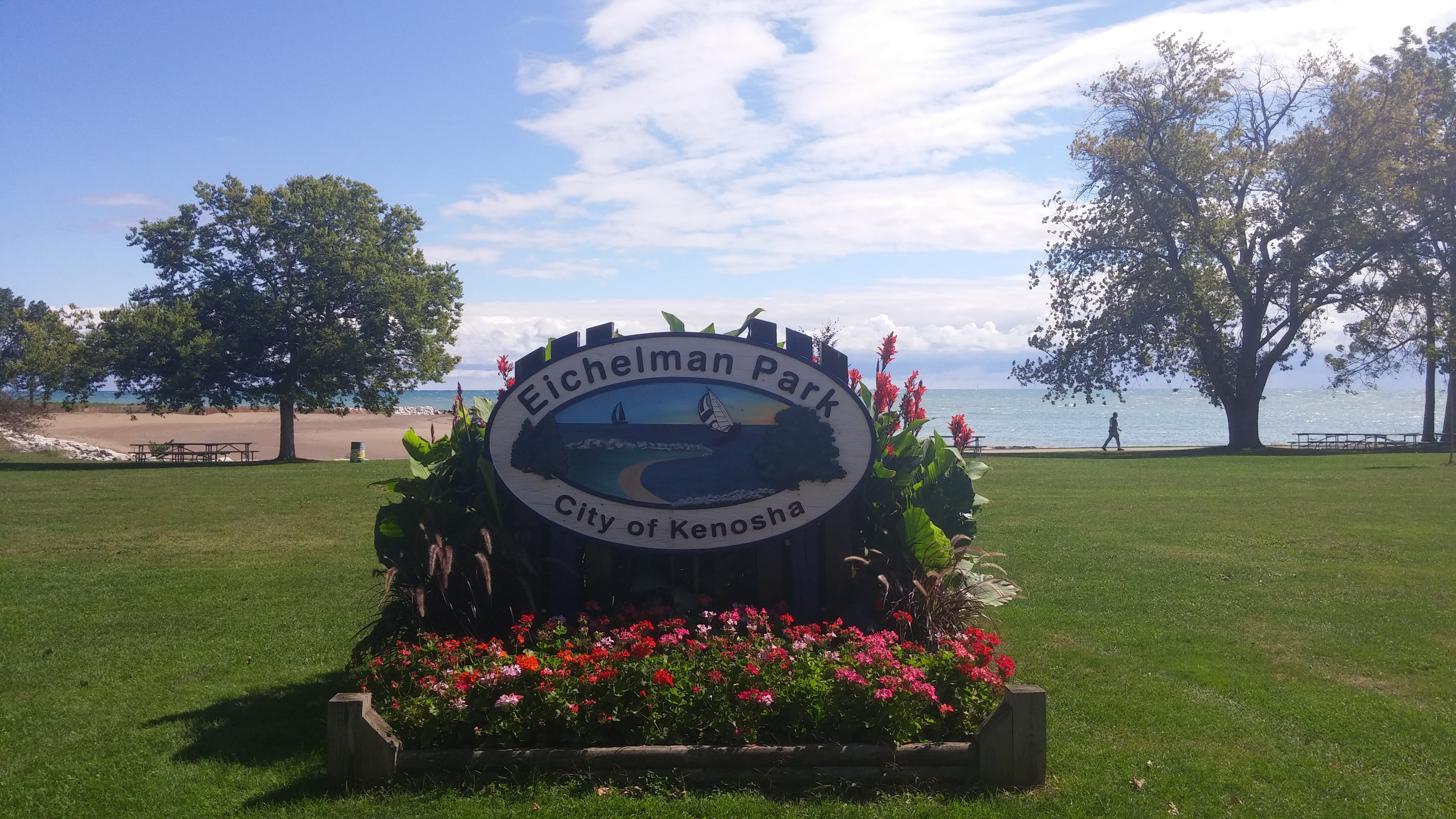
Eichelman Park in Kenosha, Wisconsin, with Lake Michigan in the background

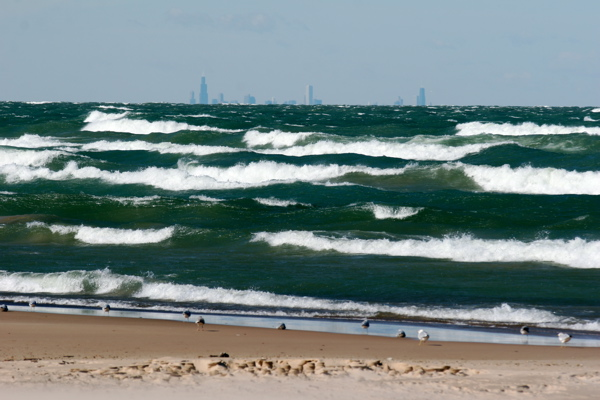
Lake Michigan and the Chicago skyline from Portage, Indiana

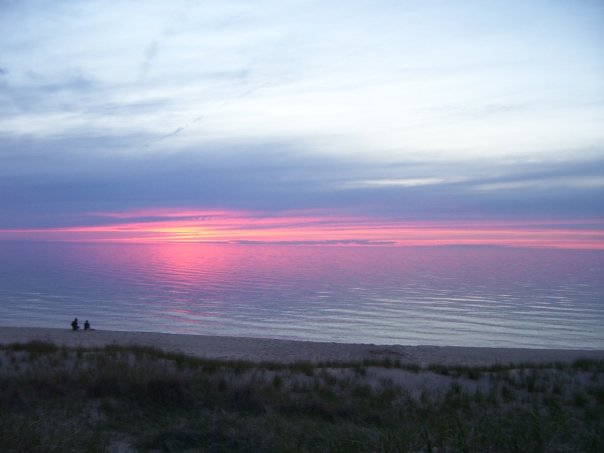
Sunset at Nordhouse Dunes

== Human activities ==
=== Fishing ===
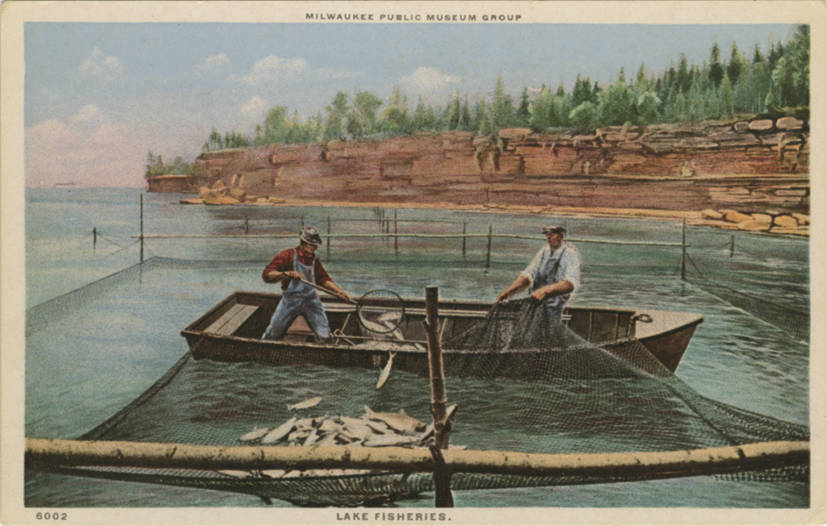
Lake fisheries postcard produced for the Milwaukee Public Museum, the backside identifies the fishermen as using a pound net.

Lake Michigan is home to a small variety of fish species and other organisms. It was originally home to lake whitefish, lake trout, yellow perch, walleye, largemouth bass, smallmouth bass and bowfin, as well as some species of catfish. As a result of improvements to the Welland Canal in 1918, an invasion of sea lampreys and overharvesting, there has been a decline in native lake trout populations, ultimately causing an increase in the population of another invasive species, the alewife. As a result, salmonids, including various strains of brown trout, steelhead (rainbow trout), coho and chinook salmon, were introduced as predators in order to decrease the wildlife population. This program was so successful that the introduced population of trout and salmon exploded, resulting in the creation of a large sport fishery for these introduced species. Lake Michigan is now stocked annually with steelhead, brown trout, and coho and chinook salmon, which have also begun natural reproduction in some Lake Michigan tributaries. However, several introduced invasive species, such as lampreys, round goby, zebra mussels and quagga mussels, continue to cause major changes in water clarity and fertility, resulting in knock-on changes to Lake Michigan's ecosystem, threatening the vitality of native fish populations.

Fisheries in inland waters of the United States are small compared to marine fisheries. The largest fisheries are the landings from the Great Lakes, worth about $14 million in 2001. Michigan's commercial fishery today consists mainly of 150 tribe-licensed commercial fishing operations through the Chippewa-Ottawa Resource Authority and tribes belonging to the Great Lakes Indian Fish and Wildlife Commission, which harvest 50 percent of the Great Lakes commercial catch in Michigan waters, and 45 state-licensed commercial fishing enterprises. The prime commercial species is the lake whitefish. The annual harvest declined from an average of 11 million pounds (5,000 t) from 1981 through to 1999 to more recent annual harvests of 8 to 9.5 million pounds (3,600 to 4,300 t). The price for lake whitefish dropped from $1.04/lb. to as low as $0.40/lb during periods of high production.

Sports fishing includes salmon, whitefish, smelt, lake trout and walleye as major catches. In the late 1960s, successful stocking programs for Pacific salmon led to the development of Lake Michigan's charter fishing industry.

=== Shipping ===
Like all of the Great Lakes, Lake Michigan is today used as a major mode of transport for bulk goods. In 2002, 162 million net tons of dry bulk cargo were moved via the Lakes. This was, in order of volume: iron ore, grain and potash. The iron ore and much of the stone and coal are used in the steel industry. There is also some shipping of liquid and containerized cargo, but most container vessels cannot pass the locks on the Saint Lawrence Seaway because the ships are too wide. The total amount of shipping on the lakes has been on a downward trend for several years. The Port of Chicago, operated by the Illinois International Port District, has grain (14 million bushels) and bulk liquid (800,000 barrels) storage facilities along Lake Calumet. The central element of the Port District, Calumet Harbor, is maintained by the U.S. Army Corps of Engineers.

=== Ferries ===
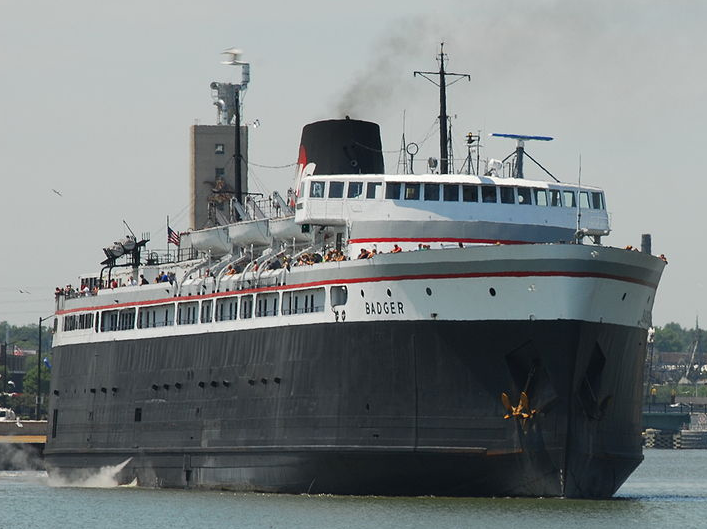
SS Badger operates ferry services between Manitowoc and Ludington

Two passenger and vehicle ferries operate ferry services across Lake Michigan, both connecting Wisconsin on the western shore with Michigan on the east. From May to October, the historic steamship, SS Badger, operates daily between Manitowoc, Wisconsin, and Ludington, Michigan, connecting U.S. Highway 10 between the two cities. The Lake Express, established in 2004, carries passengers and vehicles across the lake between Milwaukee, Wisconsin, and Muskegon, Michigan.

=== Tourism and recreation ===
Tourism and recreation are major industries on all of the Great Lakes. A few small cruise ships operate on Lake Michigan, including a couple of sailing ships. Many other water sports are practiced on the lakes, such as yachting, sea kayaking, diving, kitesurfing and lake surfing. Great Lakes passenger steamers have been operating since the mid-19th century. Several ferries currently operate on the Great Lakes to carry passengers to various islands, including Beaver Island and Bois Blanc Island (Michigan). Currently, two car ferry services traverse Lake Michigan from around April to November: the SS Badger, a steamer from Ludington, Michigan, to Manitowoc, Wisconsin, and the Lake Express, a high speed catamaran from Milwaukee to Muskegon, Michigan.

The Great Lakes Circle Tour, a designated scenic road system, connects all of the Great Lakes and the St. Lawrence River. The lake is a great place to view ice volcanoes, which typically occur at the start of the winter season.

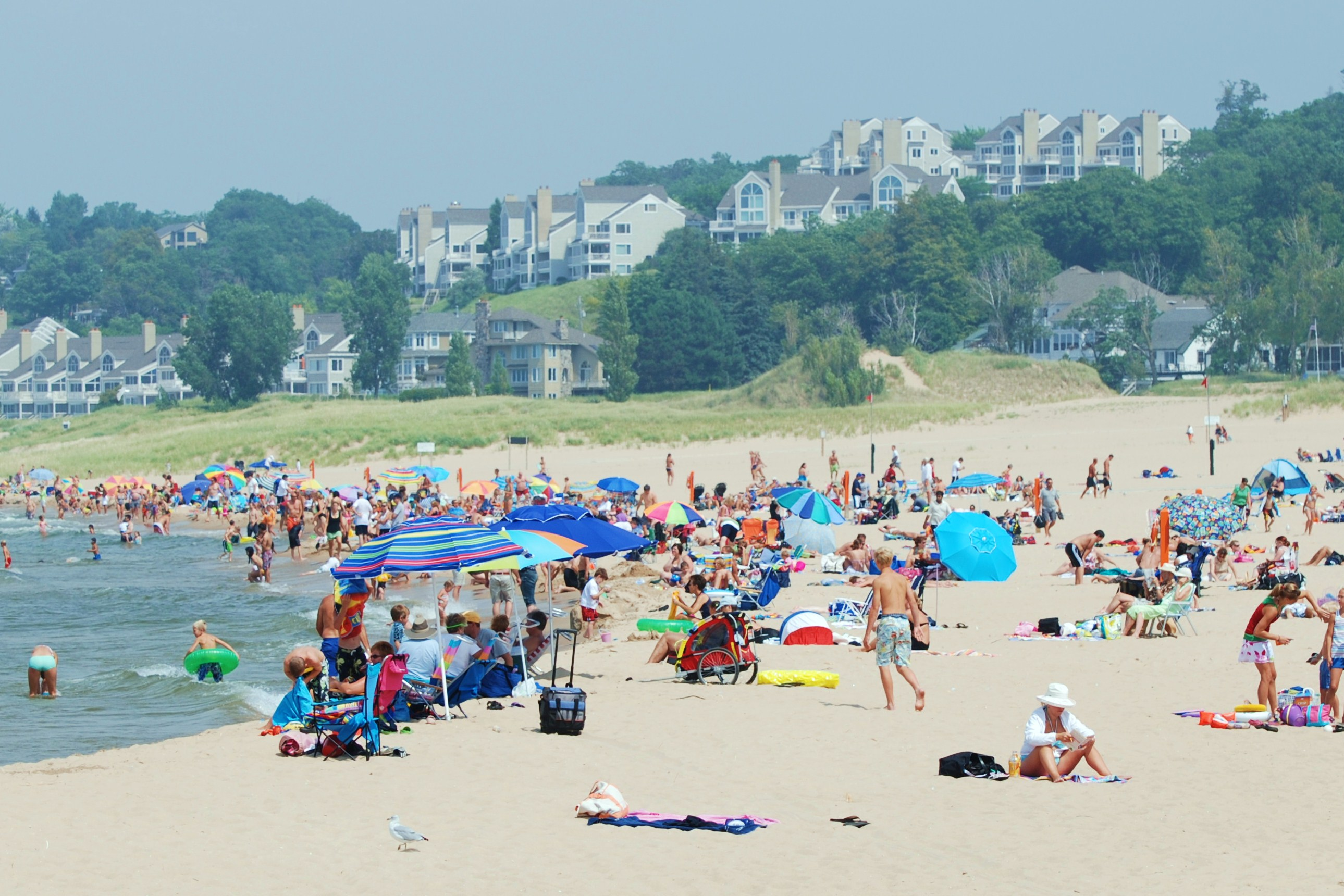
Lake Michigan beach at Holland State Park in Park Township, Michigan

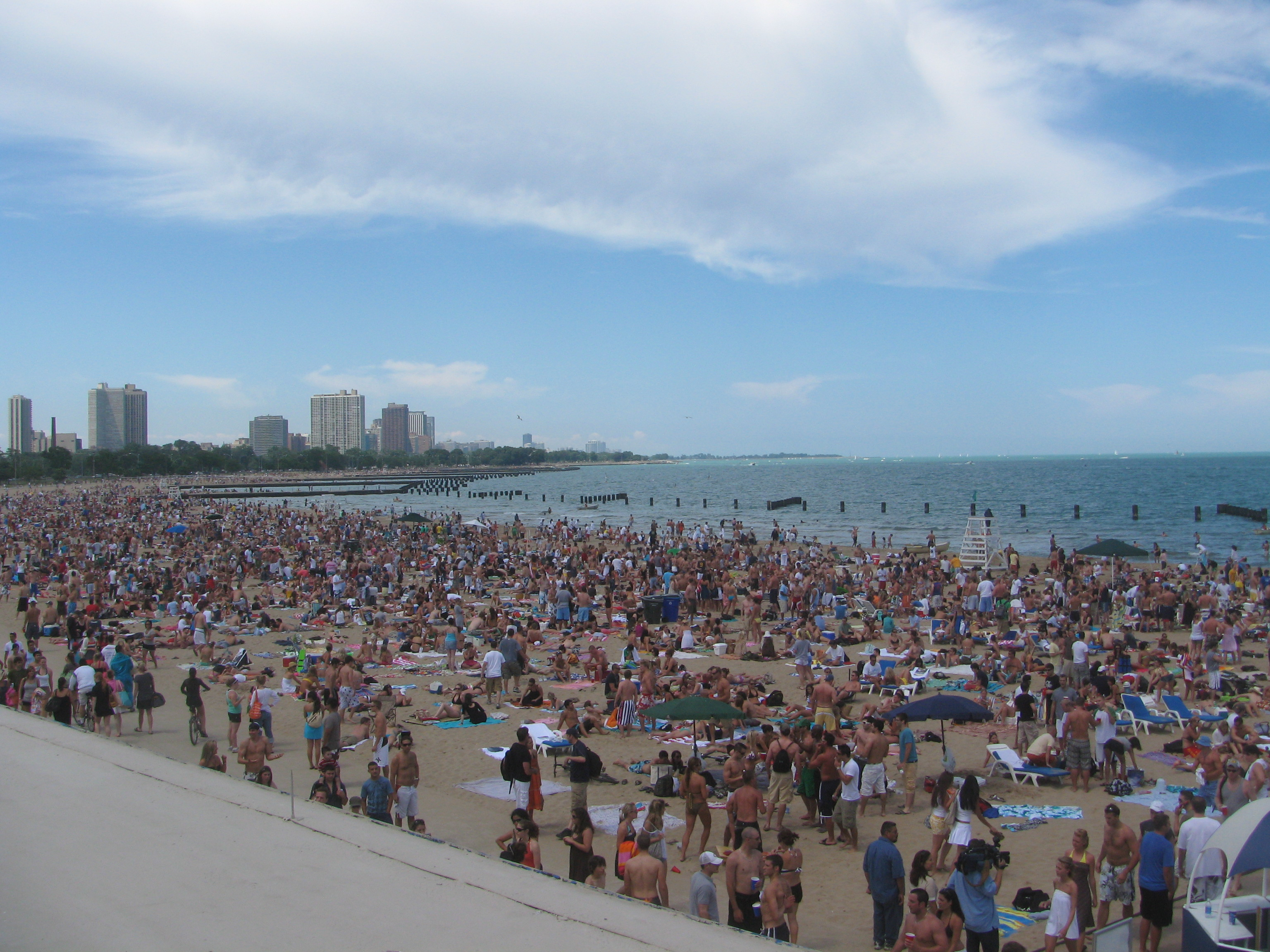
Chicago's North Avenue Beach, Lincoln Park

== See also ==
- Breakwater Chicago
- Jardine Water Purification Plant
- Lake Michigan Shore AVA
- List of lighthouses in the United States
- Leelanau Peninsula
- Little Traverse Bay
- Port of Milwaukee
- Great Lakes offshore wind power potential
- United Air Lines Flight 389, a plane that crashed into the lake in 1965.
