= Potawatomi Islands =

Archipelago in Wisconsin, United States

Coordinates: 45°22′N 86°54′W

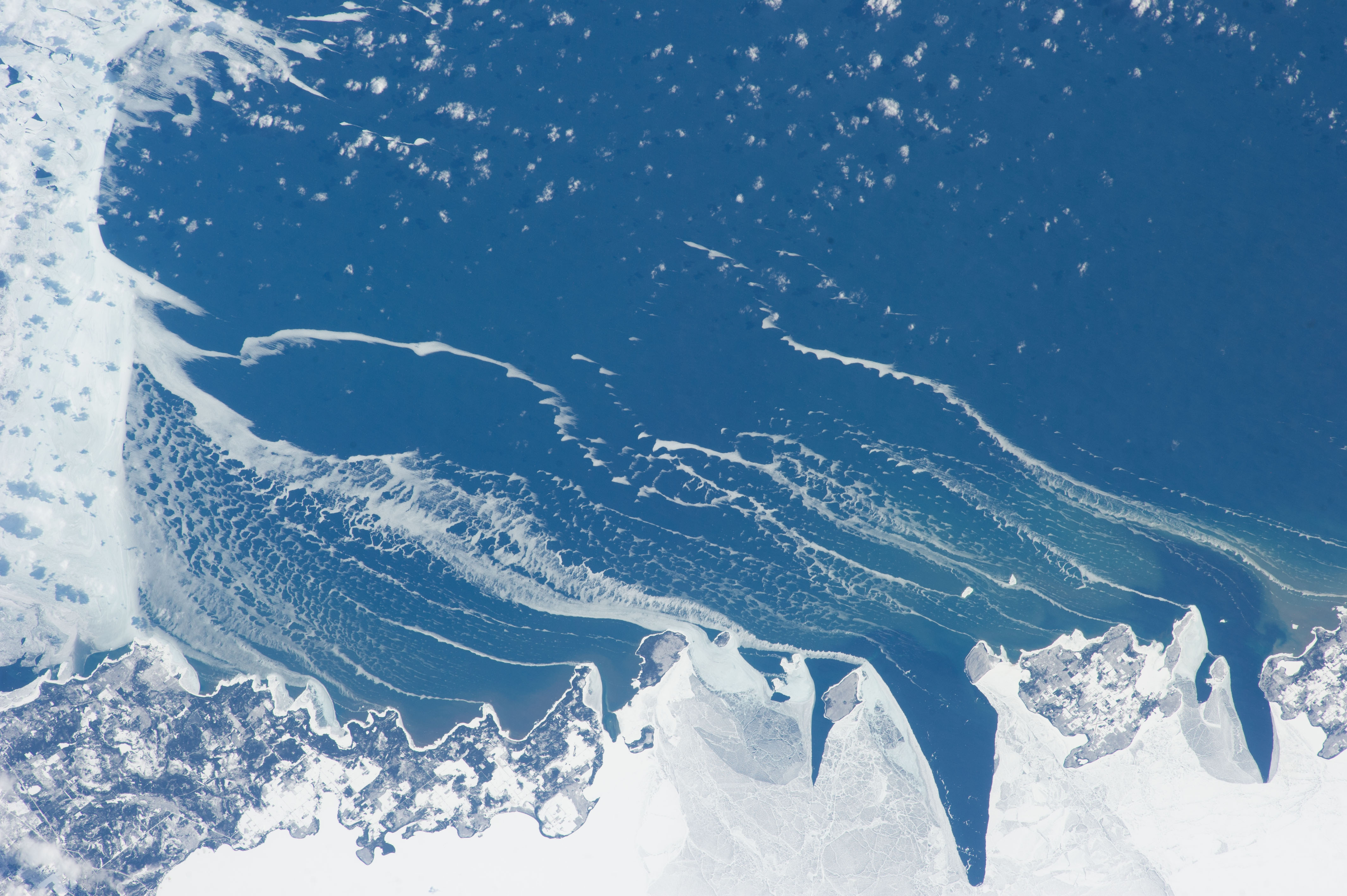
The Potawatomi Islands in February as the ice is breaking up. The edge of the Garden Peninsula to the north is on the left, and the edge of the Door Peninsula to the south is on the right.

The Potawatomi Islands is the most common historic name given to the string of islands that delineate the transition from Green Bay to Lake Michigan, one of the Great Lakes. The archipelago was previously named the Noquet Islands by early French explorers after the eponymous Michigan tribe, and the Grand Traverse Islands by American settlers.

The largest of the islands is Washington Island, in Door County, Wisconsin. Washington Island accounts for 62% of the islands' combined surface area. Others include Plum Island, Detroit Island, Hog Island, Pilot Island, and Rock Island in Wisconsin and Little Gull Island, Summer Island, Little Summer Island, Poverty Island, Rocky Island, and St. Martin Island in Michigan.

The broader term "Green Bay Islands" is used when additional islands located to the southwest are included in the island group.

== History ==
In the 19th century, a fishing industry was centered around the Potowatomi Islands. Areas where fishing was most active were termed fishing grounds, and were termed the Sack Bay, Summer Island, St. Martin Island, and Washington Island grounds. During the peak of the industry in the 1840s and 1850s, approximately 20 fishing families lived year-round on Summer Island and several more on Rock Island. Following the introduction of the steam tug in 1869 and also as the whitefish industry declined, most fishermen left the smaller islands. Those who continued to fish moved especially to Washington Island and harbors in Big and Little Bay de Noc. Switching from the sail-powered sloop to the steam tug expanded the fishermens' ranges and allowed them to live further from the fish they caught.

== Municipalities ==
The Potawatomi Islands form the Town of Washington in Door County, Wisconsin and part of Fairbanks Township in Delta County, Michigan.

== See also ==
- Lake Michigan § Islands
- Door Peninsula § Reefs and shoals in Door County waters

Peninsulas

- Garden Peninsula (to the north)
- Door Peninsula (to the south)

Nearby and adjacent waters

- Porte des Morts south of the islands
- Big Bay de Noc
- Little Bay de Noc
- Green Bay (Lake Michigan)

Counties

- Delta County, Michigan (to the north)
- Door County, Wisconsin (to the south)

Protected areas

- Green Bay National Wildlife Refuge
- Rock Island State Park
- Gravel Island National Wildlife Refuge
- Shingleton Forest Management Unit, 1,488 acres on Big Summer and Little Summer Islands

History

- Wisconsin v. Michigan, a 1936 dispute involving which state or states the Potawatomi Islands belong to; this was decided by the Supreme Court
