= Poverty Island =

Island in Lake Michigan, United States

- Location within Michigan

Geography
- Location: Lake Michigan
- Coordinates: 45°31′39″N 86°39′52″W
- Highest elevation: 617 ft (188.1 m)

Administration
- United States
- State: Michigan
- County: Delta County
- Township: Fairbanks Township

Demographics
- Population: 0

Poverty Island is a 186 acre uninhabited island in northern Lake Michigan. It is one of an archipelago of islands across the entrance to Green Bay and Big Bay de Noc commonly called the Potawatomi Islands, which are an outcropping of the Niagara Escarpment. The island is within Delta County in the U.S. state of Michigan. The surface is a mixture of forest and rocky outcroppings. The only structures are the Poverty Island Light Station (1875), an abandoned lighthouse and outbuildings which are in disrepair. Poverty Island is currently owned by the federal government.

Other islands in the Potawatomi archipelago include Little Summer Island, Summer Island, Gull Island, and St. Martin Island in Michigan, and Rock Island, Washington Island, Pilot Island, Detroit Island and Plum Island in Wisconsin. Poverty Island Passage between Poverty Island and Gull Island, is one of the principle passages into Green Bay.

Le Griffon

On June 16, 2013, U.S. and French archeologists began examining an underwater object first discovered in 2001 near Poverty Island that could be the wreck of Le Griffon, a 17th century sailing ship, although it will take time to determine if it is even a shipwreck. Dean Anderson, the Michigan State Archeologist, examined the object, an alleged "bowsprit," and determined it to be a fishing net stake. Le Griffon was the first full-sized European style sailing ship on the upper Great Lakes that was built and commanded by the French explorer René-Robert Cavelier, Sieur de La Salle in 1679. The ship disappeared with all six crew members and its cargo of furs after departing from Green Bay in Sept. of that same year on the return trip of her maiden voyage. The location and reason of her sinking has remained a mystery ever since.

== See also ==
- Door Peninsula
- Garden Peninsula
- Lake Michigan#Islands
- Porte des Morts, the legendary "death's door" to Green Bay
