= Spider Cave =

Archaeological site in Michigan, United States

- U.S. National Register of Historic Places
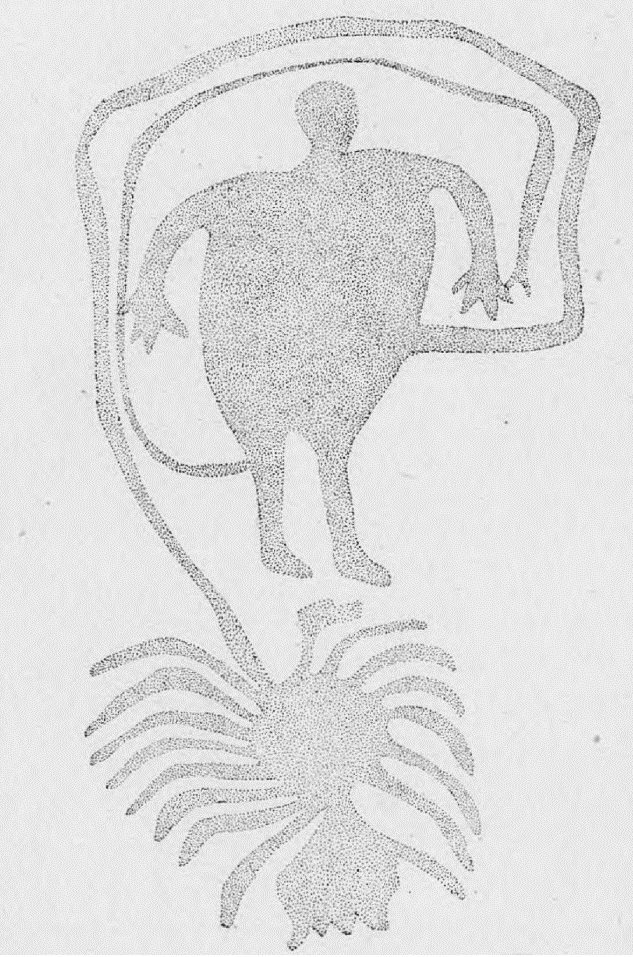
- "Spiderman" illustration from Hinsdale, 1925

- Location within Michigan Location within the United States
- Location: at the base of Burnt Bluff, near Fayette, Michigan
- Coordinates: 45°41′0″N 86°42′0″W
- Area: less than one acre
- NRHP reference No.: 71001021
- Added to NRHP: April 16, 1971

Spider Cave, also known as Burnt Bluff Cave or 20DE3, is an archaeological site located on the Garden Peninsula near Fayette, Michigan. It was listed on the National Register of Historic Places in 1971.

== Description ==
Spider Cave is a water-cut cave located 20 feet (6.1 m) above the base of Burnt Bluff, a 150 feet (46 m) limestone cliff on the shore of Big Bay de Noc. The bluff contains multiple wind- and water-cut caves. Spider Cave was formed approximately 4000 years ago, and is 90 feet (27 m) long and 30 feet (9.1 m) deep.

The cave contains four pictographs within the cave and on the walls near the entrance. The most distinctive is a pictograph of a man connected to what appears to be a spider by a spiral umbilical cord. The "Spider Man" paint colors vary from red-violet to blue-violet, and were most likely applied using colorful mineral dyes mixed with grease, along with binders from fish roe or animal hooves and skins. However, these pictographs have been fading, due in part to natural wind and water erosion, and in part to tourists applying water to the images to view them better. As of 2009, the "spiderman" image had only two of the "spider legs" visible, the remainder being hidden under lichen and precipitated salts.

== History ==
The caves on Burnt Bluff were probably first occupied by humans sometime around 1200 BC. At least 165 caves and shelters were used to some extent. There are a number of inconclusive theories on what importance this archaeological site had to the people who lived here. These include suppositions that it may have been the site of Midewiwin rituals, the home of a wendigo, a boundary marker, a place for demonstrating warrior prowess, a winter camp, a burial location, or the site of a murder.

The earliest historical recording of people in the Burnt Bluff area are the Noquet people, who inhabited the land before European settlement, and likely as early as 1500. Ojibwe people living in the area still trace their heritage back to these people, and among these communities there are multiple oral histories discussing the Burnt Bluff site and pictographs. In 1867, much of the Garden Peninsula was deeded to the Jackson Iron Company, which planned to build furnaces at Fayette. Starting in the 1880s, multiple private parties owned the land around Spider Cave.

The earliest record of the pictographs within Spider Cave is in Hinsdale's Primitive Man in Michigan. The cave was first excavated by Charles E. Cleland and G. Richard Peske in 1963. A number of artifacts were collected from the cave, most of which were Middle Woodland period projectile points. Most of the projectile points had shattered tips, suggesting they were fired into the cave from without and had shattered against the rear wall. The abundance of projectile tips and lack of other artifacts associated with normal occupation suggests that Spider Cave was not used as a normal living site.

Ruth and Henry Lang, who purchased the land in 1947, advertised the Spider Cave pictographs as a tourist attraction. The area around Burnt Bluff was acquired by the State of Michigan in the 1970s, and is now part of Fayette Historic State Park. It is closed to the public.

== See also ==
- National Register of Historic Places listings in Delta County, Michigan

== See also ==
Other caves on the Niagara Escarpment

- Door Peninsula § Caves and sinkholes
- Cherney Maribel Caves County Park
- Ledge View Nature Center
