= Geology of Wisconsin =

The geology of Wisconsin includes Precambrian crystalline basement rock over three billion years old. A widespread marine environment during the Paleozoic flooded the region, depositing sedimentary rocks which cover most of the center and south of the state.

== Geologic history, stratigraphy and tectonics ==
The oldest Precambrian rocks in Wisconsin are late Archean quartzofeldspathic gneiss, migmatite and amphibolite up to three billion years old and igneous rock such as the granite of the Puritan Quartz Monzonite. Mafic and intermediate metavolcanic rocks together with metasedimentary rocks are found in the Ramsey Formation in Iron County and iron formations in Jackson County. The metasediments and metavolcanics formed first, followed by granites more than 2.7 billion years ago.

The rock record contains an uncertain age gap with younger 1.8 billion years old Proterozoic quartzofeldspathic and migmatite gneiss, with amphibolite and biotite schist. Around 1.9 billion years ago, mafic, intermediate and felsic rocks, in some cases with subordinate metasedimentary rocks, began to form and metamorphosed, reaching greenschist and amphibolite grade on the sequence of metamorphic facies. The Ironwood and Riverton Iron formations are recognized from aerial magnetic surveys. Metamorphosed argillite, quartzite, greywacke conglomerate and marble with small areas of interbedded metavolcanic rocks make up the Tyler Formation, Palms Quartzite and Bad River Dolomite. Taken together, these early Proterozoic rocks correlate with the Marquette Range Supergroup and are intruded by banded and layered migmatite gneiss, intermediate and granite intrusive rocks, as well as massive or foliated tonalite and granodiorite (which is itself intruded by aplite and pegmatite. Near Merrill are metamorphosed ultramafic and mafic intrusive rocks with a distinctive magnetic signature.

From 1.7 to 1.6 billion years ago granite and rhyolite emplaced in south-central Wisconsin. The Baraboo and Waterloo Quartzite in the south and the Barron Quartzite in the northwest are slightly younger, along with the slate, dolomite, conglomerate and chert included in Wolf River rocks at Rib Mountain, Mosinee Hill and the McCaslin Quartzites.

The Wolf River Batholith spans from Langlade County in the north to the northern part of Portage County in the south. Anorthosite and gabbro inclusions are located near Tigerton and Rapakivi-type quartz monzonite occurs near Waupaca. Syenite and the Ninemile Swamp granite occur near Wausau.

Between 1.1 and one billion years ago, the Keweenawan Supergroup formed, which now underlies northern Wisconsin, inland and south from the shore of Lake Superior beneath Douglas County, Bayfield County and parts of Burnette and Washburn counties. Gabbro, troctolite, granophyre, anorthosite and ferrogranodiorite comprises the Mellen Intrusive Complex and similar intrusive complexes at Mineral Lake, Round Lake and Clam Lake in a line running southwest from the Montreal River. Mafic volcanic rocks overlie quartzite in the Powder Mill Group and Bessemer, which begin northeast of Hayward, Wisconsin and extend northeast, meeting the string of intrusive complexes. From as far south as Polk County northeast through Burnette, Washburn, Bayfield and much of Douglas counties are the widespread basalt flows of the Chengwatana Volcanic Group in the west and the Portage Lake Volcanics in the east.

=== Paleozoic (539–252 million years ago) ===
Unmetamorphosed sedimentary rocks are found in the rock record from the Cambrian, in the early Paleozoic. The feldspathic quartz sandstone and orthoquartz sandstone of Chequamegon, Devils Island and Orienta formations make up the Bayfield Group which underlies the entire Lake Superior shoreline of the state from Chequamecon Bay to the St. Louis River in the west. Most of the state, in a loop from Waupaca County in the east, south in a narrow belt to the Iowa line and west to Eau Claire, Dunn, Barron and parts of Polk and Burnett counties, the underlying rocks are sandstone with dolomite and shale belonging to the Trempeauleau, Elk Mound and Tunnel City groups. Ordovician are particularly widespread in southern and eastern Wisconsin, from the Mississippi River in the west to Kenosha, Racine and Milwaukee in the east. Along the shore, they reach Marquette and underlie the Door Peninsula. These rocks include the dolomite, sandstone and shale of the Prairie du Chien Group, Ancell Group sandstone, limestone, conglomerate and shale, Sinnipee Group dolomite and limestone as well as the shale and dolomite of the Maquoketa Formation which is overlain by the Neda Formation oolite iron oxides. A narrow band along the Lake Michigan shore from Milwaukee to south of Sheboygan, including Port Washington displays Devonian shale and limestone.

Paleozoic rocks in eastern Wisconsin today make up the Niagara Escarpment, a shelf of rock extending from Door County to Horicon Marsh. The cliffs along the escarpment are primarily formed by the early Silurian Mayville Dolostone; the rocks that make up the escarpment were deposited within the Michigan Basin. Continued subsidence of this basin during deposition meant that many of the rock layers in eastern Wisconsin have been tilted towards the east.

=== Mesozoic (252–66 million years ago) ===
Very few rocks from the Mesozoic are preserved in Wisconsin, other than occasional areas of non-marine Cretaceous gravel and clay rich in iron. Select rocks in the Driftless Area have yielded ammonite fossils from the middle Turonian period, when Wisconsin was covered by the Western Interior Seaway.

=== Cenozoic (66 million years ago–Present) ===
No rocks from the Paleogene or Neogene period are known from Wisconsin; however, abundant Quaternary deposits can be found as a result of the last Ice Age. The most recent glacial cycle, the Wisconsin Glaciation, began about 31,500 years ago and receded from the state by around 7,000 years ago. During this time the Lake Michigan Lobe and the Green Bay Lobe moved across the state; also present were the Chippewa, Superior, Wisconsin Valley, and Langlade lobes. These glacial lobes carved out deep valleys and deposited sediments up to 600 feet deep. Much of central and southwest Wisconsin were never glaciated, leaving the earlier river-generated topography intact; this area is known as the Driftless Area.

== Select caves ==
- Cave of the Mounds
- Cherney Maribel Caves County Park
- Crystal Cave
- Door Peninsula § Caves and sinkholes
- Eagle Cave
- Ledge View Nature Center
- Samuels' Cave
- St. John Mine
- Tainter Cave
