= Gull Island (Michigan) =

Gull Island is the name of a dozen small islands in the U.S. state of Michigan.

On Lake Huron:

- In Alpena County at 45°03′23″N 83°13′55″W, just outside Thunder Bay and within the Thunder Bay National Marine Sanctuary.
- In Arenac County at 44°01′03″N 83°26′29″W, at the mouth of the Saginaw Bay. It is a tiny island in Sims Township between Charity Island and Little Charity Island.
- In Bay County at 43°39′07″N 83°51′13″W, in the Saginaw Bay at the mouth of the Saginaw River near Bay City.
- In Mackinac County at 45°43′12″N 84°25′36″W at the eastern end of the Straits of Mackinac just off the southern shore of Bois Blanc Island.

On Lake Michigan:

- In Charlevoix County Gull Island Charlevoix County at 45°42′09″N 85°50′19″W, west of Beaver Island. It is within St. James Township and is part of the Michigan Islands National Wildlife Refuge.
- In Delta County at 45°30′36″N 86°43′10″W, between St. Martin Island and Poverty Island at the southeast opening of the Big Bay de Noc. It is part of Fairbanks Township. Little Gull Island is an even smaller island about a mile to the south.
- In Leelanau County on Northport Bay of the Grand Traverse Bay region. It is a 5-acre (20,000 m^{2}) "No Trespassing Nature Preserve" owned by the Leelanau Conservancy which is dedicated to protecting this southernmost herring gull colony nesting area on Lake Michigan. The island, also known as Trout Island or Bellows Island, is located at 45°06′04″N 85°34′11″W.

On Lake Superior:

- Gull Islands are a cluster of small islands in Keweenaw County at 48°15′44″N 88°15′53″W. They are northeast of Passage Island in Isle Royale National Park, and lie nearly on top of the International Boundary.
- In Marquette County at 46°57′00″N 87°57′25″W, part of the Huron Islands and the Huron National Wildlife Refuge.

On Lake St. Clair:

- In St. Clair County at 42°31′49″N 82°40′56″W. It is at the mouth of the south channel of the St. Clair River. Currently the site of the annual Jobbie Nooner party in Michigan.

On St. Marys River system:

- On Potagannissing Bay at the south end of the St. Marys River in Chippewa County at 46°02′10″N 83°47′31″W. It is northwest of Drummond Island and is part of Drummond Township.
- On Munuscong Lake off the St. Marys River in Chippewa County at 46°10′14″N 84°13′03″W.

On inland lakes:

- On Manistique Lake in Portage Township, Mackinac County at 46°14′28″N 85°48′36″W
