= Garden Township, Michigan =

- Civil township
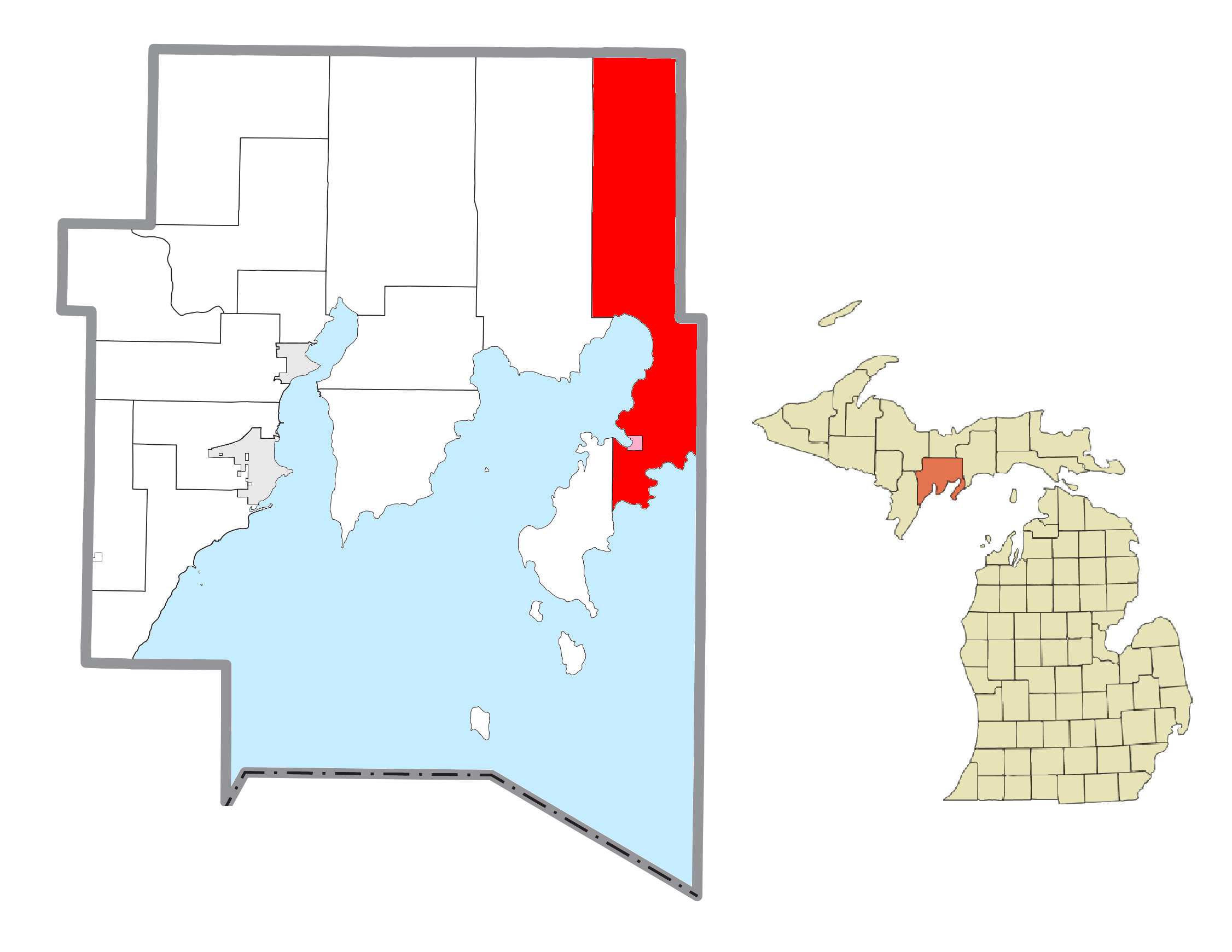
- Location within Delta County (red) and the administered village of Garden (pink)

- Location within the state of Michigan Garden Township (the United States)
- Coordinates: 45°58′06″N 86°32′17″W
- Country: United States
- State: Michigan
- County: Delta

Government
  - Supervisor: Richard Pichette

Area
  - Total: 184.4 sq mi (477.6 km^{2})
  - Land: 159.9 sq mi (414.2 km^{2})
  - Water: 24.5 sq mi (63.4 km^{2})
- Elevation: 610 ft (186 m)

Population (2020)
  - Total: 772
  - Density: 4.83/sq mi (1.86/km^{2})
- Time zone: UTC-5 (Eastern (EST))
  - Summer (DST): UTC-4 (EDT)
- ZIP code(s): 49817, 49835, 49854, 49878, 49895
- Area code: 906
- FIPS code: 26-31400
- GNIS feature ID: 1626333
- Website: https://www.gardentwp.com/

Garden Township is a civil township of Delta County in the U.S. state of Michigan. As of the 2020 census, the township had a total population of 772, up from 750 at the 2010 census. In 2012, it became home to the first wind farm in the Upper Peninsula, the 28 MW Garden Wind Farm.

== Communities ==
- The Village of Garden is located within the township.
- Garden Corners is an unincorporated community in the township at the northeast of the Big Bay de Noc at 45°53′25″N 86°32′12″W. It is on U.S. Highway 2 about 16 miles (26 km) west of Manistique, and is also the northern terminus of M-183 which connects with Garden, nine miles (14 km) to the south and with Fayette, about 17 miles (27 km) to the south.
- Isabella is an unincorporated community about four miles (6.4 km) west of Garden Corners on US 2 at 45°53′51″N 86°36′21″W.

== Geography ==
The township occupies the northern portion of the Garden Peninsula, with the Big Bay de Noc, which opens onto Green Bay on the west and Lake Michigan on the east. The township also extends about 16 miles (26 km) northward along the entire eastern boundary between Delta County and Schoolcraft County to the northern boundary of Delta with Schoolcraft.

According to the United States Census Bureau, the township has a total area of 184.4 square miles (478 km^{2}), of which 159.9 square miles (414 km^{2}) is land and 24.5 square miles (63 km^{2}) is water. The total area is 13.27% water.

== Climate ==
Wolf Lake

Climate chart (precipitation, max. and min. temperature)
| J | F | M | A | M | J | J | A | S | O | N | D |
| 100 −10 −15 | 69 −7 −16 | 58 −1 −9 | 84 9 −1 | 78 17 3 | 96 21 10 | 121 23 15 | 81 21 14 | 105 18 10 | 157 11 2 | 130 4 −3 | 92 −7 −12 |
- █ Average max. and min. temperatures in °C
- █ Precipitation totals in mm
Imperial conversion
| J | F | M | A | M | J | J | A | S | O | N | D |
| 3.9 14 5 | 2.7 19 3 | 2.3 30 16 | 3.3 48 30 | 3.1 63 37 | 3.8 70 50 | 4.8 73 59 | 3.2 70 57 | 4.1 64 50 | 6.2 52 36 | 5.1 39 27 | 3.6 19 10 |
- █ Average max. and min. temperatures in °F
- █ Precipitation totals in inches

Ansels Point (far west side)

Climate chart (precipitation, max. and min. temperature)
| J | F | M | A | M | J | J | A | S | O | N | D |
| 63 −8 −16 | 52 −10 −15 | 55 −3 −8 | 78 7 −2 | 63 12 6 | 91 13 9 | 113 21 14 | 74 19 15 | 118 17 14 | 118 9 3 | 104 5 3 | 64 0 −4 |
- █ Average max. and min. temperatures in °C
- █ Precipitation totals in mm
Imperial conversion
| J | F | M | A | M | J | J | A | S | O | N | D |
| 2.5 18 3 | 2 14 5 | 2.2 27 18 | 3.1 45 28 | 2.5 54 43 | 3.6 55 48 | 4.4 70 57 | 2.9 66 59 | 4.6 63 57 | 4.6 48 37 | 4.1 41 37 | 2.5 32 25 |
- █ Average max. and min. temperatures in °F
- █ Precipitation totals in inches

== Demographics ==
As of the census of 2000, there were 817 people, 348 households, and 249 families residing in the township. The population density was 5.1 inhabitants per square mile (2.0/km^{2}). There were 654 housing units at an average density of 4.1 per square mile (1.6/km^{2}). The racial makeup of the township was 88.25% White, 0.12% African American, 5.75% Native American, 0.37% Asian, and 5.51% from two or more races. Hispanic or Latino of any race were 0.86% of the population.

There were 348 households, out of which 24.7% had children under the age of 18 living with them, 62.9% were married couples living together, 5.2% had a female householder with no husband present, and 28.2% were non-families. 24.4% of all households were made up of individuals, and 12.6% had someone living alone who was 65 years of age or older. The average household size was 2.35 and the average family size was 2.74.

In the township the population was spread out, with 22.2% under the age of 18, 3.1% from 18 to 24, 24.2% from 25 to 44, 31.7% from 45 to 64, and 18.8% who were 65 years of age or older. The median age was 46 years. For every 100 females, there were 106.8 males. For every 100 females age 18 and over, there were 103.8 males.

The median income for a household in the township was $37,083, and the median income for a family was $40,313. Males had a median income of $34,750 versus $29,063 for females. The per capita income for the township was $20,445. About 5.4% of families and 9.1% of the population were below the poverty line, including 9.9% of those under age 18 and 9.7% of those age 65 or over.

== See also ==
- Rosiere, Wisconsin on the Door Peninsula, site of the Rosiere Wind Farm
