= Rocky Island (Michigan) =

Island in Michigan, United States

- Location within Michigan

Geography
- Location: Lake Michigan
- Coordinates: 45.6091501°N 86.7095743°W
- Area: 10 acres (4.0 ha)
- Highest elevation: 591 ft (180.1 m)

Administration
- United States
- State: Michigan
- County: Delta County
- Township: Fairbanks Township

Rocky Island is an island in Lake Michigan. It is located in Fairbanks Township, in Delta County, Michigan. The island is 10 acres (4.0 ha) in size, and lies two miles (3.2 km) off Michigan's Garden Peninsula near Little Summer Island.

Rocky Island was donated to The Nature Conservancy in 1986. In 2015, the island became part of the Green Bay National Wildlife Refuge.

== Diagram ==
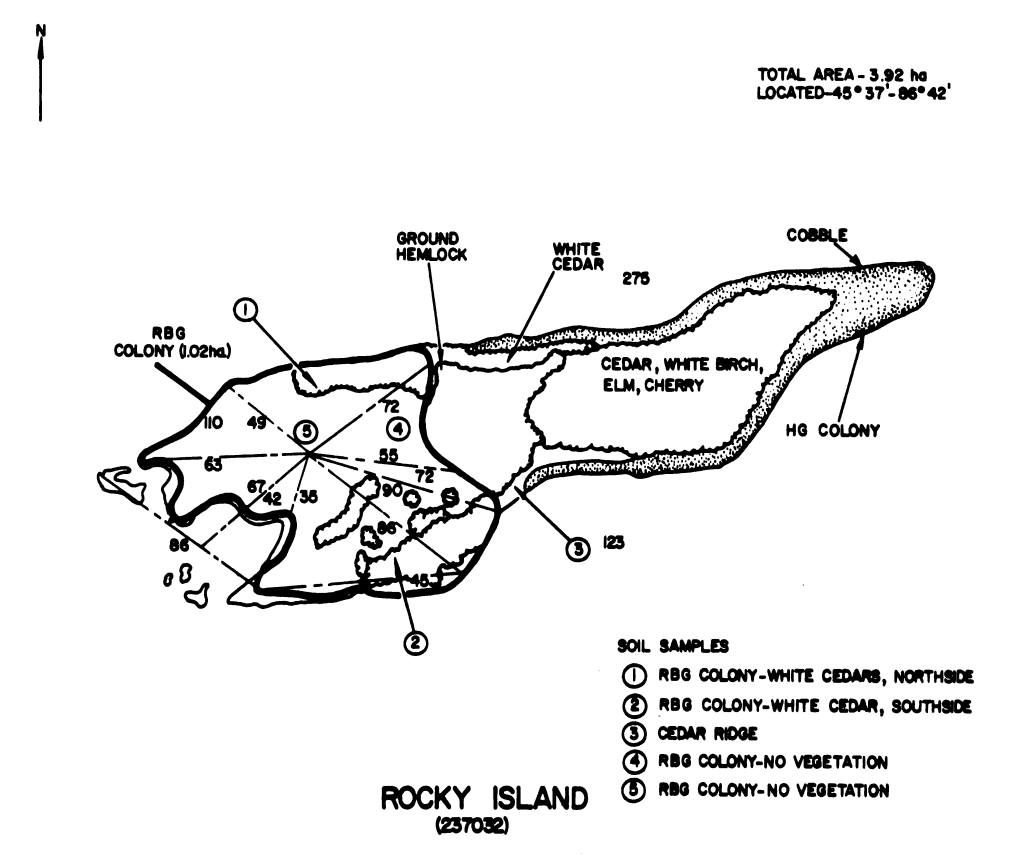
Diagram of the island made from a visit to and flight over the island in 1976.
