= Little Summer Island =

Island in Michigan, United States

- Location within Michigan

Geography
- Location: Lake Michigan
- Coordinates: 45.60609°N 86.69401°W
- Highest elevation: 607 ft (185 m)

Administration
- United States
- State: Michigan
- County: Delta County
- Township: Fairbanks Township

Little Summer Island is an island in Lake Michigan. It is located in Fairbanks Township, in Delta County, Michigan. It was logged extensively in the late 1800s.

== Other islands in the chain are from north to south ==
- Little Summer Island
- Summer Island
- Poverty Island
- Gull Island
- St. Martin Island
- Rock Island
- Washington Island
- Pilot Island
- Detroit Island
- Plum Island
