= M-183 (Michigan highway) =

State highway in Delta County, Michigan, United States

M-183
- M-183 highlighted in red

Route information
- Maintained by MDOT
- Length: 16.377 mi (26.356 km)
- Existed: February 1985–present

Major junctions
- South end: Fayette State Park entrance
- North end: US 2 in Garden Corners

Location
- Country: United States
- State: Michigan
- Counties: Delta

Highway system
- Michigan State Trunkline Highway System; Interstate; US; State; Byways
← M-179	→ M-185

M-183 is a north–south state trunkline highway in the Upper Peninsula of the US state of Michigan. It serves Fayette State Park as an access route from US Highway 2 (US 2). The highway runs through rural farmlands of the Garden Peninsula and next to Big Bay de Noc, a bay of Lake Michigan. The community at Fayette dates back to the 1860s. It has been a state park since the late 1950s, and the connecting road has been a state highway since the 1980s.

== Route description ==
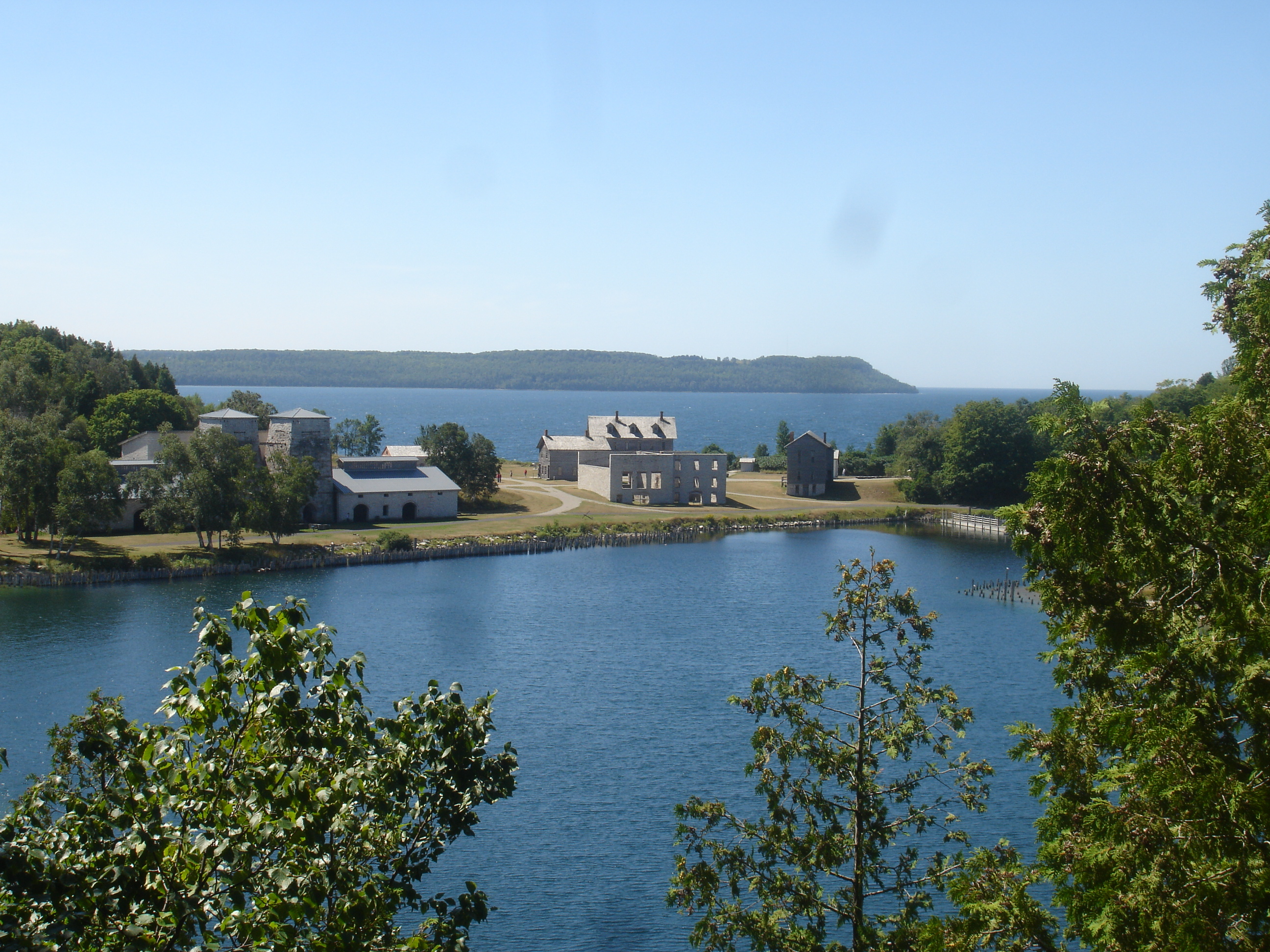
Fayette Historic Townsite from the overlook trail up on the dolemite cliffs

M-183 lies on the Garden Peninsula in Delta County. Running along the east shore of Big Bay de Noc, the highway starts at the gate to Fayette State Park. South of entrance to the park, the roadway continues under local jurisdiction as Delta County Road 483 (CR 483). From there north, it is a rural two-lane road that runs northeasterly through woodland. The trunkline turns north along LI Road through farmland, and then east along 16th Road near Puffy Bay. South of Garden, the highway turns north through the village on State Street. M-183 continues north of town running through the farms of the Garden Peninsula along Big Bay de Noc through the Lake Superior State Forest to the northern terminus at US 2 in Garden Corners.

The Michigan Department of Transportation (MDOT) maintains the highway like all other state trunkline highways under its jurisdiction. As a part of these responsibilities, the department tracks the volume of traffic along its highways. These surveys are expressed using a metric called average annual daily traffic (AADT), which is a calculation of the traffic counts for a segment of roadway on any average day of the year. In 2009, MDOT determined that 692 vehicles a day used the segment near the state park. Through the middle section in Garden, the peak volume was 892 vehicles daily which dropped to 878 at the US junction. The commercial AADT was 54 trucks for the entire highway. M-183 has not been listed on the National Highway System, a network of roads important to the country's economy, defense, and mobility.

== History ==
Fayette State Park encompasses an historical iron smelting town site from the 1800s. Now a ghost town, the Jackson Iron Company operations lasted here from 1867 to 1891. The town was used as a location to produce charcoal iron, a purified form of the iron ore mined in the UP. After the furnaces shut down, the town operated as a resort community until the park was created. The Michigan Conservation Department created the park in 1959 after it traded land to obtain the 90 acres (36 ha) from the Escanaba Paper Company and the 71 acres (29 ha) from Cleveland-Cliffs Iron Company. The Delta County Commission had been requesting state assistance for improving the road since 1975. In February 1985, MDOT took control of the road from the county road commission and designated it M-183. The number was chosen to reflect the CR 483 designation it once bore. After the transfer, the state resurfaced the road as part of a program of improvements to benefit park visitors.

== Major intersections ==
The entire highway is in Delta County.

Location	mi	km	Destinations	Notes
Fayette	0.000	0.000	Fayette State Park entrance CR 483 south	
Garden Corners	16.377	26.356	US 2 / LMCT – Escanaba, Manistique	
1.000 mi = 1.609 km; 1.000 km = 0.621 mi
