= Stonington Peninsula =

Peninsula in Michigan

- Peninsula
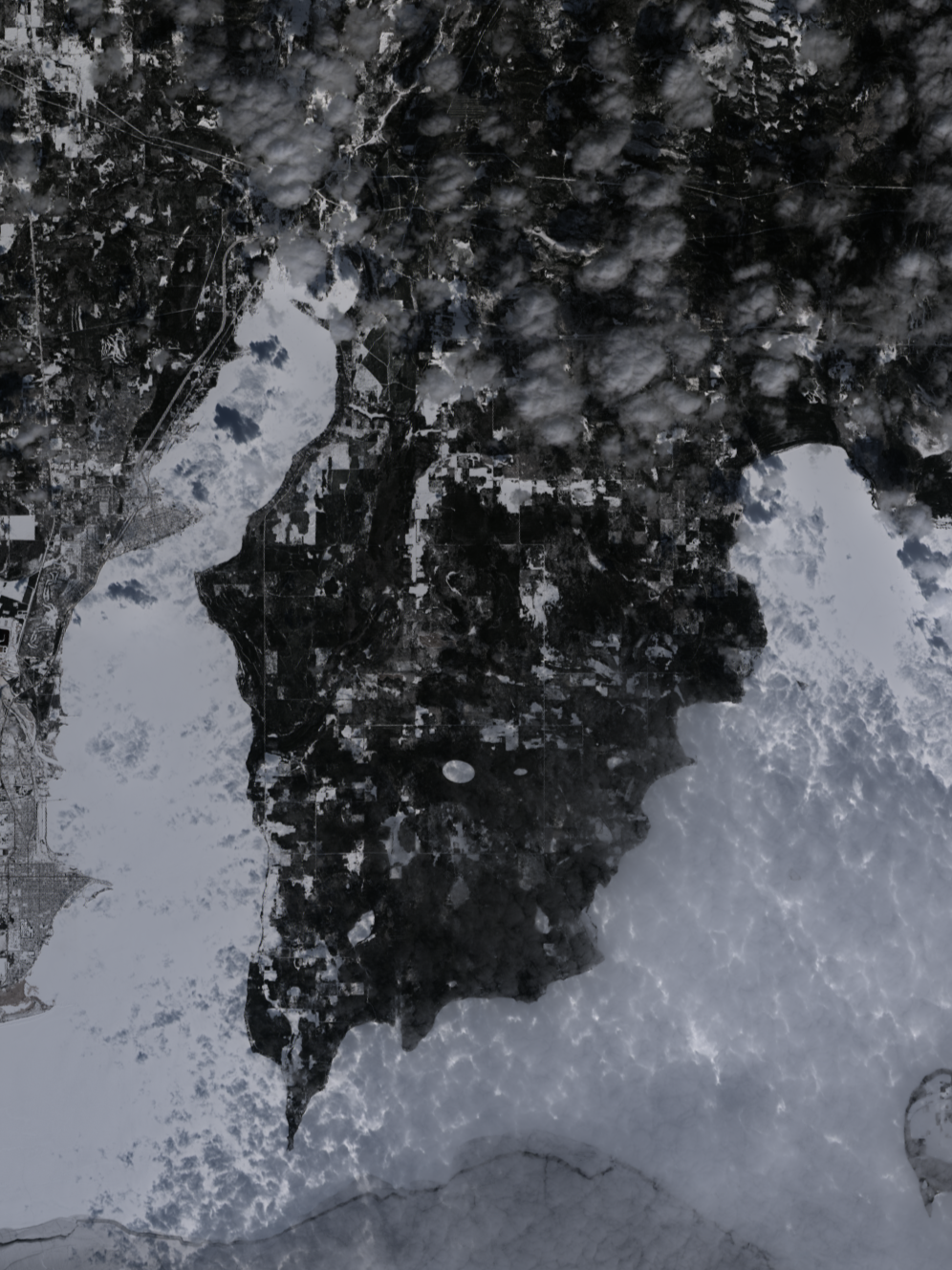
- Satellite image of the Stonington Peninsula, March 2022

- Location within Michigan
- Coordinates: 45°47′N 86°54′W
- Location: Delta County, Michigan, Upper Peninsula of Michigan, United States
- Water bodies: Big Bay de Noc, Little Bay de Noc, Lake Michigan

Dimensions
  - Length: 16 miles (26 km)

The Stonington Peninsula is a peninsula of 16 miles (26 km) in length that extends southwestward into Lake Michigan's Green Bay from the mainland of Michigan's Upper Peninsula. The peninsula, entirely contained within Delta County, is bordered by Big Bay de Noc to the east, and Little Bay de Noc to the west. The cities of Gladstone and Escanaba are opposite the peninsula across Little Bay de Noc. Like the Garden Peninsula to its east, the base of the peninsula is served by U.S. Highway 2.

The peninsula is relatively isolated from the rest of the U.P., with an approximate year-round population of 1,000 and no major roads in its interior. It is under the jurisdiction of Bay de Noc Township in the southern half, and Ensign Township in the northern half. It is also wholly within the western section of the Hiawatha National Forest, with various landmarks and recreation sights like the Peninsula Point Light protected by the United States Forest Service.
