= Bay de Noc =

Bay de Noc may refer to one of several places in the U.S. state of Michigan:

- Little Bay de Noc
- Big Bay de Noc
- Bay de Noc Township, Michigan, on the peninsula separating the Big and Little Bays de Noc
