= Ensign Township, Michigan =

- Civil township
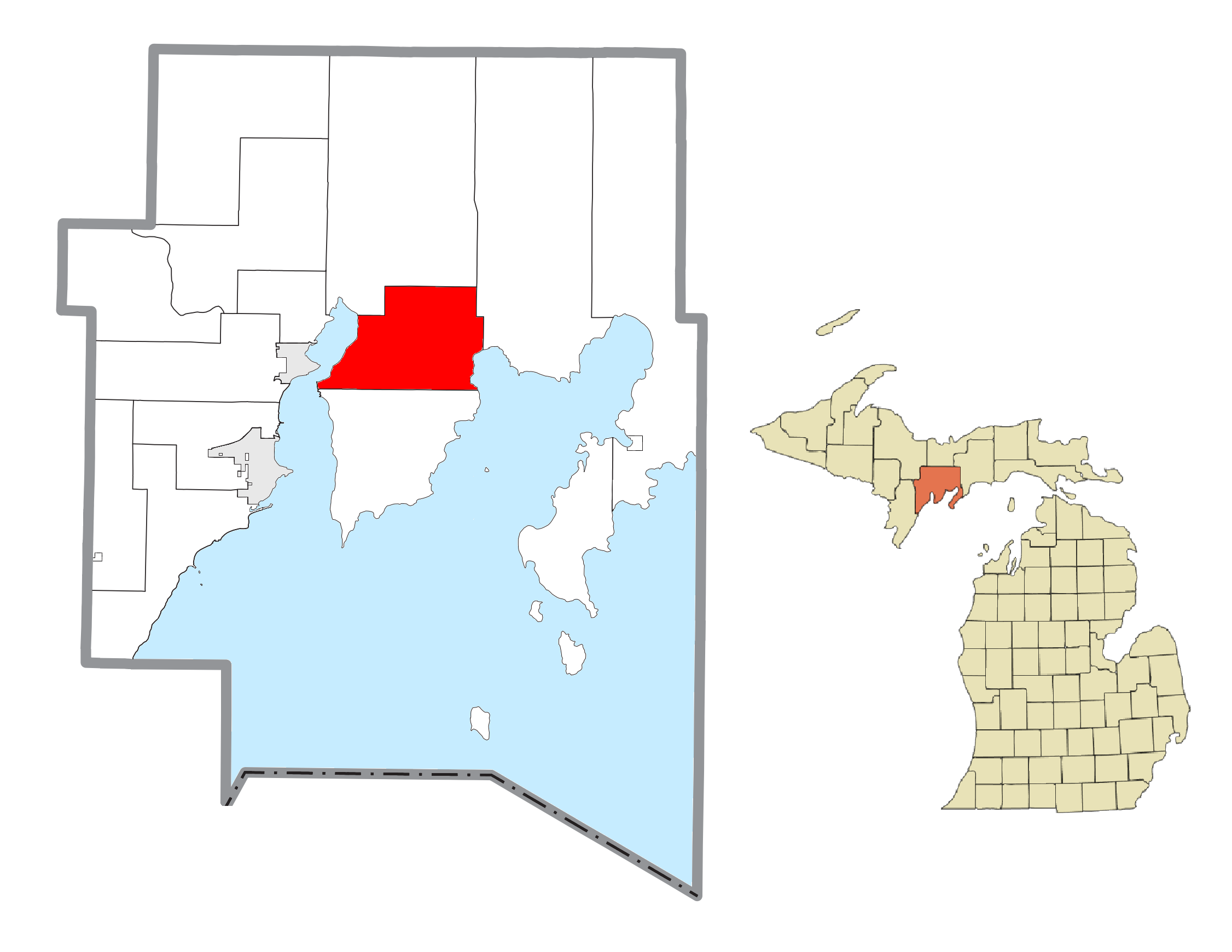
- Location within Delta County

- Location within the state of Michigan Ensign Township (the United States)
- Coordinates: 45°52′16″N 86°53′39″W
- Country: United States
- State: Michigan
- County: Delta

Government
  - Supervisor: John Wolf

Area
  - Total: 65.8 sq mi (170.4 km^{2})
  - Land: 59.0 sq mi (152.7 km^{2})
  - Water: 6.8 sq mi (17.7 km^{2})
- Elevation: 715 ft (218 m)

Population (2020)
  - Total: 746
  - Density: 12.7/sq mi (4.89/km^{2})
- Time zone: UTC-5 (Eastern (EST))
  - Summer (DST): UTC-4 (EDT)
- ZIP code(s): 49878
- Area code: 906
- FIPS code: 26-26140
- GNIS feature ID: 1626242

Ensign Township is a civil township of Delta County in the U.S. state of Michigan. The population was 746 at the 2020 census, slightly down from 748 at the 2010 census. It encompasses the northern half of the Stonington Peninsula.

== Communities ==
- Maywood is an unincorporated community in the township.

== Geography ==
According to the United States Census Bureau, the township has a total area of 65.8 square miles (170 km^{2}), of which 59.0 square miles (153 km^{2}) is land and 6.8 square miles (18 km^{2}) (10.37%) is water.

=== Climate ===
Malman Marsh

Climate chart (precipitation, max. and min. temperature)
J	F	M	A	M	J	J	A	S	O	N	D
63 −12 −18	52 −13 −21	55 −2 −8	78 9 −2	63 13 6	91 16 12	113 21 15	74 19 14	118 19 14	118 8 5	104 7 0	64 0 −5
- █ Average max. and min. temperatures in °C
- █ Precipitation totals in mm
Imperial conversion
J	F	M	A	M	J	J	A	S	O	N	D
2.5 10 0	2 9 −6	2.2 28 18	3.1 48 28	2.5 55 43	3.6 61 54	4.4 70 59	2.9 66 57	4.6 66 57	4.6 46 41	4.1 45 32	2.5 32 23
- █ Average max. and min. temperatures in °F
- █ Precipitation totals in inches

== Demographics ==
As of the census of 2000, there were 780 people, 327 households, and 236 families residing in the township. The population density was 13.2 inhabitants per square mile (5.1/km^{2}). There were 532 housing units at an average density of 9.0 per square mile (3.5/km^{2}). The racial makeup of the township was 94.62% White, 0.38% African American, 3.85% Native American, and 1.15% from two or more races.

There were 327 households, out of which 27.8% had children under the age of 18 living with them, 64.5% were married couples living together, 4.6% had a female householder with no husband present, and 27.8% were non-families. 23.5% of all households were made up of individuals, and 7.6% had someone living alone who was 65 years of age or older. The average household size was 2.39 and the average family size was 2.82.

In the township the population was spread out, with 22.8% under the age of 18, 4.5% from 18 to 24, 25.0% from 25 to 44, 29.6% from 45 to 64, and 18.1% who were 65 years of age or older. The median age was 44 years. For every 100 females, there were 107.4 males. For every 100 females age 18 and over, there were 109.8 males.

The median income for a household in the township was $39,375, and the median income for a family was $48,906. Males had a median income of $38,438 versus $28,333 for females. The per capita income for the township was $25,546. About 2.1% of families and 4.1% of the population were below the poverty line, including 3.6% of those under age 18 and 4.0% of those age 65 or over.

Fire coverage is provided by the Ensign Township Fire Department. EMS coverage is provided by Masonville EMS.
