= Garden, Michigan =

- Village
- Village of Garden
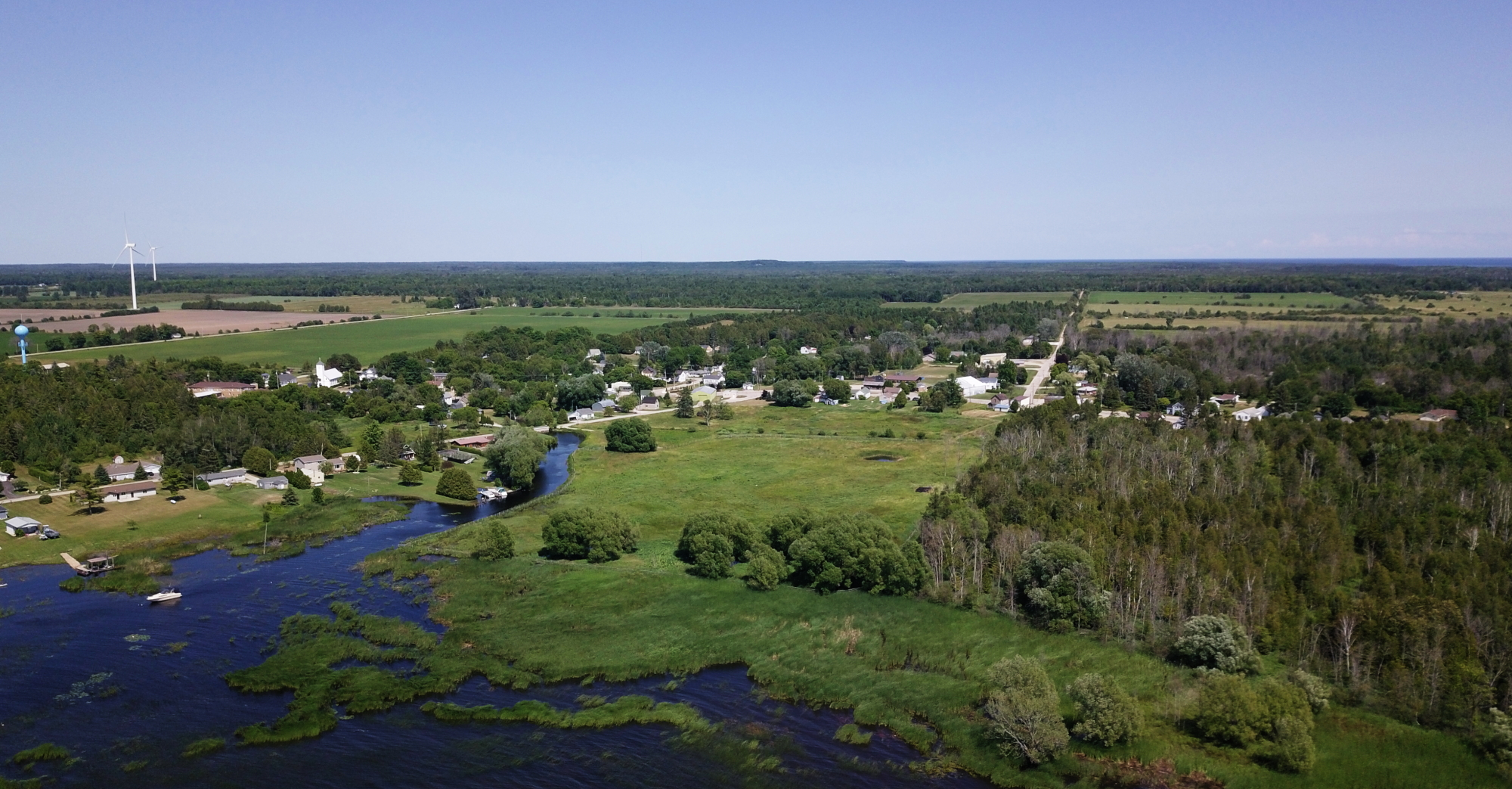
- Aerial view of the village of Garden

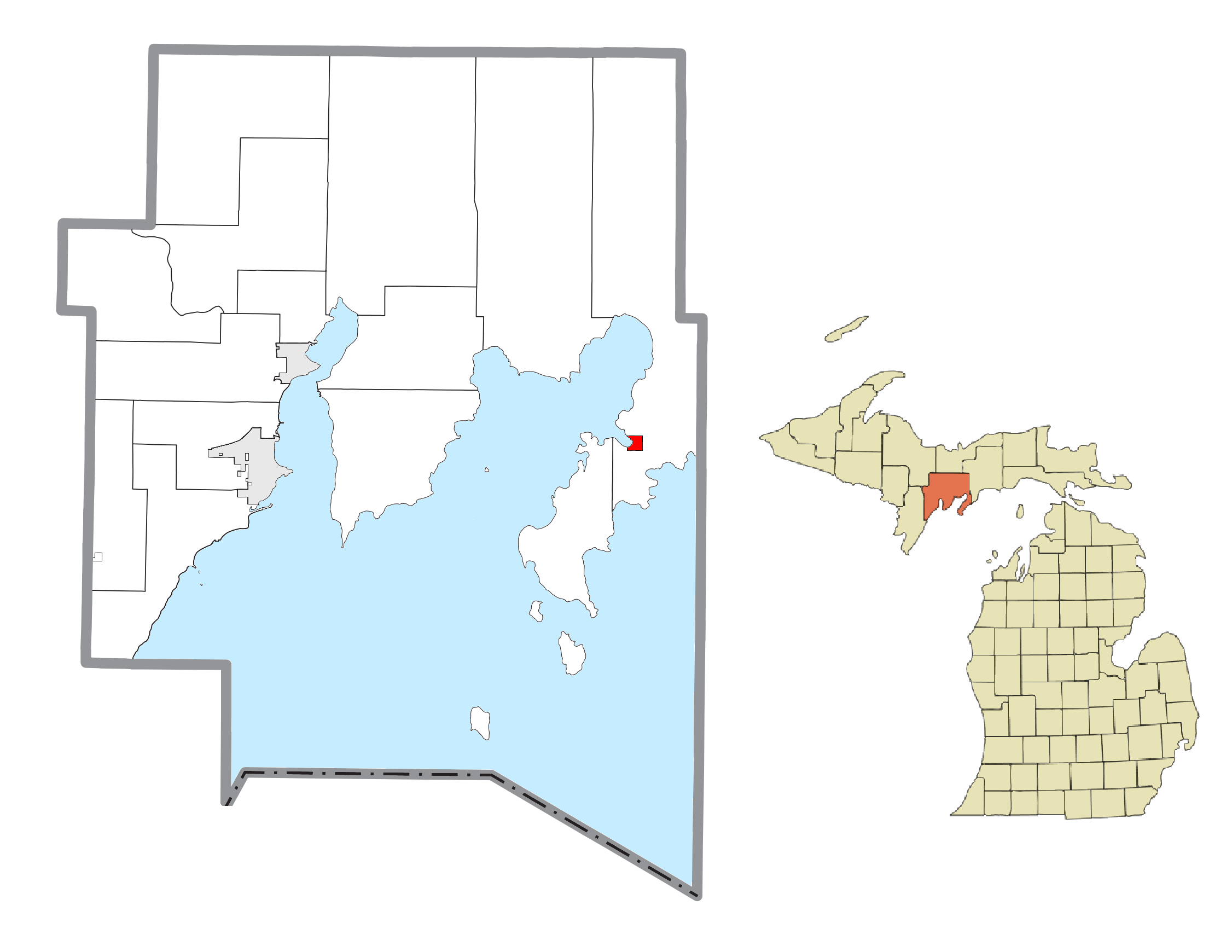
- Location within Delta County

- Location within the state of Michigan Location within the United States
- Coordinates: 45°46′28″N 86°33′06″W
- Country: United States
- State: Michigan
- County: Delta
- Township: Garden
- Settled: 1850
- Incorporated: 1886

Government
  - President: Jeffrey LeFevre
  - Clerk: Colleen Weinert

Area
  - Total: 1.03 sq mi (2.68 km^{2})
  - Land: 0.83 sq mi (2.14 km^{2})
  - Water: 0.21 sq mi (0.54 km^{2})
- Elevation: 590 ft (180 m)

Population (2020)
  - Total: 174
  - Density: 209.64/sq mi (80.94/km^{2})
- Time zone: UTC-5 (Eastern (EST))
  - Summer (DST): UTC-4 (EDT)
- ZIP code(s): 49835
- Area code: 906
- FIPS code: 26-31380
- GNIS feature ID: 0626629
- Website: Official website

Garden is a village in Delta County of the U.S. state of Michigan. The population was 174 at the 2020 census. The village is located within Garden Township.

M-183 runs through the village, connecting with Fayette eight miles (13 km) southwest and with U.S. Highway 2 at Garden Corners, nine miles (14 km) to the north.

== History ==
This settlement along Big Bay de Noc lies in the historic land of the Noquet. When it was first settled around 1850 by Metis it was known as Garden Bay or Haley's Bay. It was incorporated as a village in 1886.

== Geography ==
The village is situated on the Garden Peninsula where the Garden Creek flows into Garden Bay, a small inlet off the Big Bay de Noc, which opens onto Green Bay, on Lake Michigan.

According to the United States Census Bureau, the village has a total area of 1.02 square miles (2.64 km^{2}), of which 0.81 square miles (2.10 km^{2}) is land and 0.21 square miles (0.54 km^{2}) is water.

== Demographics ==
Historical population
Census	Pop.	Note	%±
1890	458		—
1900	465		1.5%
1910	497		6.9%
1920	395		−20.5%
1930	371		−6.1%
1940	462		24.5%
1950	399		−13.6%
1960	380		−4.8%
1970	336		−11.6%
1980	296		−11.9%
1990	268		−9.5%
2000	240		−10.4%
2010	221		−7.9%
2020	174		−21.3%
U.S. Decennial Census

=== 2010 census ===
As of the census of 2010, there were 221 people, 99 households, and 63 families living in the village. The population density was 272.8 inhabitants per square mile (105.3/km^{2}). There were 134 housing units at an average density of 165.4 per square mile (63.9/km^{2}). The racial makeup of the village was 87.3% White, 5.0% Native American, and 7.7% from two or more races. Hispanic or Latino of any race were 0.5% of the population.

There were 99 households, of which 26.3% had children under the age of 18 living with them, 47.5% were married couples living together, 7.1% had a female householder with no husband present, 9.1% had a male householder with no wife present, and 36.4% were non-families. 31.3% of all households were made up of individuals, and 14.1% had someone living alone who was 65 years of age or older. The average household size was 2.21 and the average family size was 2.65.

The median age in the village was 49.4 years. 21.3% of residents were under the age of 18; 4.9% were between the ages of 18 and 24; 16.7% were from 25 to 44; 34.8% were from 45 to 64; and 22.2% were 65 years of age or older. The gender makeup of the village was 52.0% male and 48.0% female.

=== 2000 census ===
As of the census of 2000, there were 240 people, 104 households, and 74 families living in the village. The population density was 283.1 inhabitants per square mile (109.3/km^{2}). There were 129 housing units at an average density of 152.2 per square mile (58.8/km^{2}). The racial makeup of the village was 80.42% White, 8.75% Native American, and 10.83% from two or more races.

There were 104 households, out of which 27.9% had children under the age of 18 living with them, 59.6% were married couples living together, 4.8% had a female householder with no husband present, and 28.8% were non-families. 25.0% of all households were made up of individuals, and 17.3% had someone living alone who was 65 years of age or older. The average household size was 2.31 and the average family size was 2.70.

In the village, the population was spread out, with 24.2% under the age of 18, 3.3% from 18 to 24, 22.5% from 25 to 44, 28.3% from 45 to 64, and 21.7% who were 65 years of age or older. The median age was 45 years. For every 100 females, there were 96.7 males. For every 100 females age 18 and over, there were 93.6 males.

The median income for a household in the village was $36,250, and the median income for a family was $46,500. Males had a median income of $36,875 versus $30,469 for females. The per capita income for the village was $16,605. About 3.0% of families and 7.6% of the population were below the poverty line, including 14.8% of those under the age of eighteen and 13.2% of those 65 or over.

== Climate ==
This climatic region is typified by large seasonal temperature differences, with warm to hot (and often humid) summers and cold (sometimes severely cold) winters. According to the Köppen Climate Classification system, Garden has a humid continental climate, abbreviated "Dfb" on climate maps.

Garden

Climate chart (precipitation, max. and min. temperature)
J	F	M	A	M	J	J	A	S	O	N	D
63 −8 −16	52 −10 −15	55 −3 −8	78 7 −2	63 12 6	91 13 9	113 21 14	74 19 15	118 17 14	118 9 3	104 5 3	64 0 −4
- █ Average max. and min. temperatures in °C
- █ Precipitation totals in mm
Imperial conversion
J	F	M	A	M	J	J	A	S	O	N	D
2.5 18 3	2 14 5	2.2 27 18	3.1 45 28	2.5 54 43	3.6 55 48	4.4 70 57	2.9 66 59	4.6 63 57	4.6 48 37	4.1 41 37	2.5 32 25
- █ Average max. and min. temperatures in °F
- █ Precipitation totals in inches

== Notable people ==
- John B. Bennett
- James D. Dotsch
