= James D. Dotsch =

American politician

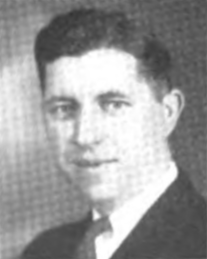
Michigan State Senator James D. Dotsch

James D. Dotsch (March 9, 1904 – November 24, 1986) was an American politician who was a Democratic member of the Michigan State Senate, representing the 30th District from 1937 to 1940. When he was elected he was 32 years old.

Dotsch was born in Garden, Michigan, son of Henry R. Dotsch and Katherine Kelly. He was the father of Roland "Rollie" Dotsch.
