= Summer Island =

Island in Michigan, United States

- Location within Michigan Location within the United States

Geography
- Location: Lake Michigan
- Coordinates: 45°33′48″N 86°38′11″W
- Highest elevation: 689 ft (210 m)

Administration
- United States
- State: Michigan
- County: Delta County
- Township: Fairbanks Township

Demographics
- Population: Uninhabited

Summer Island is an island in Lake Michigan, 2.5 miles (4 km) miles off the southern tip of the Garden Peninsula in the U.S. state of Michigan. It can easily be seen from Fairport, on the southern end of Delta County Road 483, the locally maintained extension of M-183, but is not accessible to the public.

The island is part of the Niagara Escarpment archipelago in northwestern Lake Michigan. Its highest point is 710 feet (217 m) above sea level, and 129 feet (40 m) above the level of the lake. One of its most prominent shoreline features is Gravel Point, a northern headland that stretches toward the Garden Peninsula mainland. More than half the island is owned by the state of Michigan and administered as part of Lake Superior State Forest.

== Summer Island site ==
On the island's northeast side, two shallow points protect Summer Harbor, a small maritime shelter and site of a former settlement. Summer Harbor is adjacent to an archeological landmark listed on the National Register of Historic Places as the Summer Island site. Pottery recovered here indicates that the island may have been inhabited since the Middle Woodland period (circa 1 CE – 500 CE).

During the 19th century, Summer Harbor was a fishing station for the harvesting of lake trout and whitefish, and served as a place to live for a small corps of loggers who harvested the island's timber. In the early 20th century, Summer Harbor was again abandoned.

Archeologists excavated the Native American/Euro-American settlement site in 1968–70.
