= Jobbie Nooner =

Boat party in Michigan, U.S.

Coordinates: 42°31′49″N 82°40′48″W

Jobbie Nooner is a large boat party that takes place around Gull Island in Lake Saint Clair, Michigan.

According to co-creator Jack Campbell, "The very first Jobbie Nooner occurred Friday, June 28th, 1974."

Auto workers, who called themselves "Jobbies", would take the last Friday in June off work to party at Gull Island (Lake St. Clair, Michigan). The event was originally timed to coincide with the birthday of Lee Wagner, the event's other co-creator, but eventually grew to become a bigger celebration.

The party now occurs twice a year. Jobbie Nooner is the last Friday in June and Jobbie Nooner Two is the first Saturday after Labor Day.

According to an interview with Jack Campbell published in the 2015 Lake St. Clair Guide, the first Jobbie Nooner was held at Strawberry Island on June 27, 1977 - which was Jack's 33rd birthday. According to Jack, Lee O'Dell accompanied him to this 1st time party. There were 6 boats and about 25 Jobbies from Jack's workplace Creative Industries. As the event grew, the party was moved to Fisher Bay. According to this interview Jack stated Lee O'Dell was a good promoter and although Lee did not own a boat, encouraged many to meet at the Buccaneer Restaurant on Anchor Bay, where people would all ride out together for the day.
