= Cherney Maribel Caves County Park =

County park in Wisconsin (US)

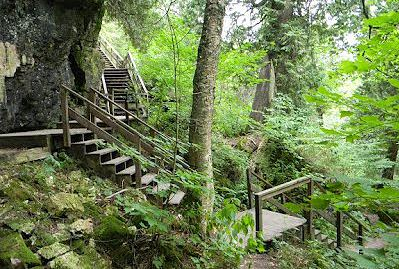

- Location within Wisconsin Location within the United States
- Location: Manitowoc County, Wisconsin
- Coordinates: 44°17′12.0474″N 87°46′30.3708″W
- Area: 75 acres (30 ha)
- Established: 1963
- Owner: Manitowoc County
- Website: Official website
- Wisconsin State Natural Areas

Cherney Maribel Caves County Park is a county park located near Maribel in Manitowoc County, Wisconsin, United States. The park occupies 75 acres along the West Twin River. Cherney Maribel Caves consists of eleven caves along a rugged cliff line that runs parallel with the West Twin River. Maribel New Hope Cave, Tartarus Cave, Sinkhole Cave and Split Rock Cave are all gated off, with visitors needing guides to visit those caves. They are gated due to past vandalism to the Speleothems, and to protect the current Speleothems.

== History ==
The Cherney Maribel Caves were formed primarily by solution prior to the last ice age. Glaciers wore down the surface of the land and exposed a layer of rock called Niagara Dolomite along the Niagara Escarpment, exposing crevices and sinkholes, allowing water to easily enter the caves. As the glaciers melted, the rushing water enlarged the existing caves, and later partially filled them with silt and gravel as the flow of water receded. The rushing melt water also carved the river valley. Since then, frost action has loosened rock from the cliff face, partially to fully closing the cave entrances.

About 1892, the first of the caves were discovered on the property of Henry A. Alrich, and was soon purchased by Charles Steinbrecher, who, in 1900, built the nearby Maribel Caves Hotel. Over the next several decades, tourists came to see the caves. In 1931, Adolph Cherney bought the property, including the nearby hotel. On November 5, 1963, Cherney sold the cave property to Manitowoc County for $16,200, leading to it becoming the first Manitowoc County park.

== Caves ==
The following is a list of caves at Cherney Maribel Caves County Park, listed North to South in the park along the bluff line:

=== Spring Cave ===
Spring Cave is a small inaccessible cave located on adjacent private property. A natural spring that flows from the cave was previously used by the nearby Maribel Caves Hotel. This cave is on private property and can only be viewed by the viewing deck on Manitowoc County Property.

=== Maribel New Hope Cave ===
Maribel New Hope Cave is the largest cave in Manitowoc County. It was discovered on Sunday, February 5, 1984. It is noted for its walking passageways, and is lighted by electric floodlights. It contains examples of stalactites, stalagmites, Helictites, and cave bacon. The cave is a public show cave. It is open the 3rd Sunday of every month from May through October from 10 am to 3 pm for public tours. The cave is still being excavated and explored further by members of the Wisconsin Speleological Society. College instructors use this cave as a living laboratory.

=== Aquadulce Cave ===
Aquadulce Cave was discovered in 2003 by Wisconsin Speleological Society members. It is a smaller crawling wild cave that currently has about 30 ft passage that goes northwest and then curves to the left going west. Aguaduice is situated a ways off the banks of the West Twin River in the Wisconsin State Natural Area of Cherney Maribel Caves County Park. Aquadulce Cave is located in the escarpment ridge that runs the length of the park measuring about sixty feet in height above the riverbed. The entrance to the cave is almost at the top of the bluff line along the park bluff and is not easily reached. Aquadulce Cave is probably the hardest to access, as there is a 8 ft pit to crawl into first before reaching the floor of the cave. "Aquadulce" is Spanish for freshwater, literally meaning Sweetwater.

=== Pancake Cave ===
Pancake Cave is difficult to reach because no trails lead to it. The cave is about eight feet deep and is shaped like a pancake.

=== Coopers Cave ===
Coopers Cave is located about midway along the park bluff. The cave has a large rectangular entrance and also has a small crevice entrance. It is a square tube solutional cave that is quiet and dry. About nine feet below the entrance is a natural spring that flows year round into the West Twin River.

=== Staircase Cave ===
Staircase Cave is a small relatively inaccessible cave.

=== Split Rock Cave ===
Split Rock Cave was discovered in the winter of 2008 by Wisconsin Speleological Society members on a -22deg below zero winter day noticing steam coming out and feather frost brimming at the entrance of the cave. Split Rock Cave today is part of the Tartarus Cave System, this cave involves all hands and knee crawling except for a few sit-up areas with domes.

=== Tunnel Passage ===
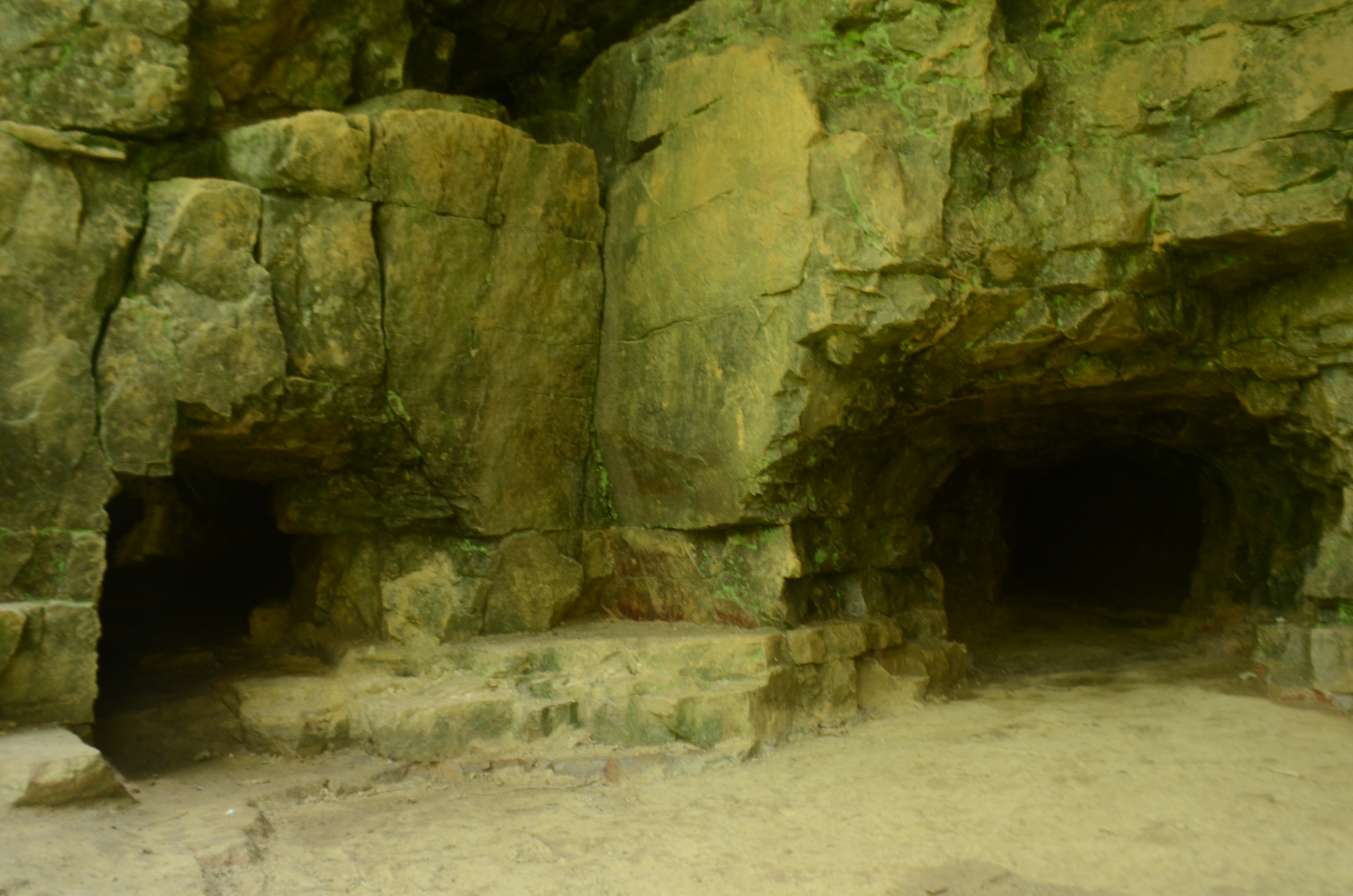
Cave entrance at Cherney Maribel Caves County Park

Tunnel Passage, discovered in 2005, is about 20 feet long and approximately three feet in height.

=== Tartarus Cave System ===
The Tartarus Cave System is a large system of caves in the park that is still being excavated. It has three entrances: Tunnel Passage Entrance, the Tartarus Cave Entrance, and the Split Rock Cave Entrance.

=== Cave of Treasures ===
Cave of Treasures is located to the south just beyond the Tartarus Cave System in the same bluff. It is the most recently discovered cave by the Wisconsin Speleological Society. It consists of a three to four foot high horizontal entrance, that leads to over 70 feet of hands and knees crawlway passages. It is believed that further excavation, or digging, will open up passageway continuations so it will eventually connect it up to the Tartarus Cave System just to the north.

=== Sinkhole Cave ===
Sinkhole Cave is located to the south of Cave of Treasures above the bluff line, it is the currently the only cave in the park one has to rappel into.

== Features ==
The park offers a playground, a picnic area, and hiking and biking trails. A picnic shelter with bathrooms is located in the picnic area. Along the cliff line are several varieties of rare ferns, along with creeping plants and wild flowers. The beauty of the area made it a popular tourist destination even before Manitowoc County acquired the property in 1963.

== 2013 tornado ==
In August 2013, a tornado ripped through Cherney Maribel Cave County Park. It destroyed more than 75 percent of the trees, the picnic shelter, and the restrooms. The restrooms and picnic shelters have since been rebuilt, one on south end of park called the Tartarus Pavilion with flush facilities and other on north end of the park called the New Hope Pavilion with pit facilities.

== See also ==
Other caves on the Niagara Escarpment

- Ledge View Nature Center (also has caves open to tours)
- Door Peninsula § Caves and sinkholes
- Spider Cave
