= Ledge View Nature Center =

County park in Wisconsin (US)

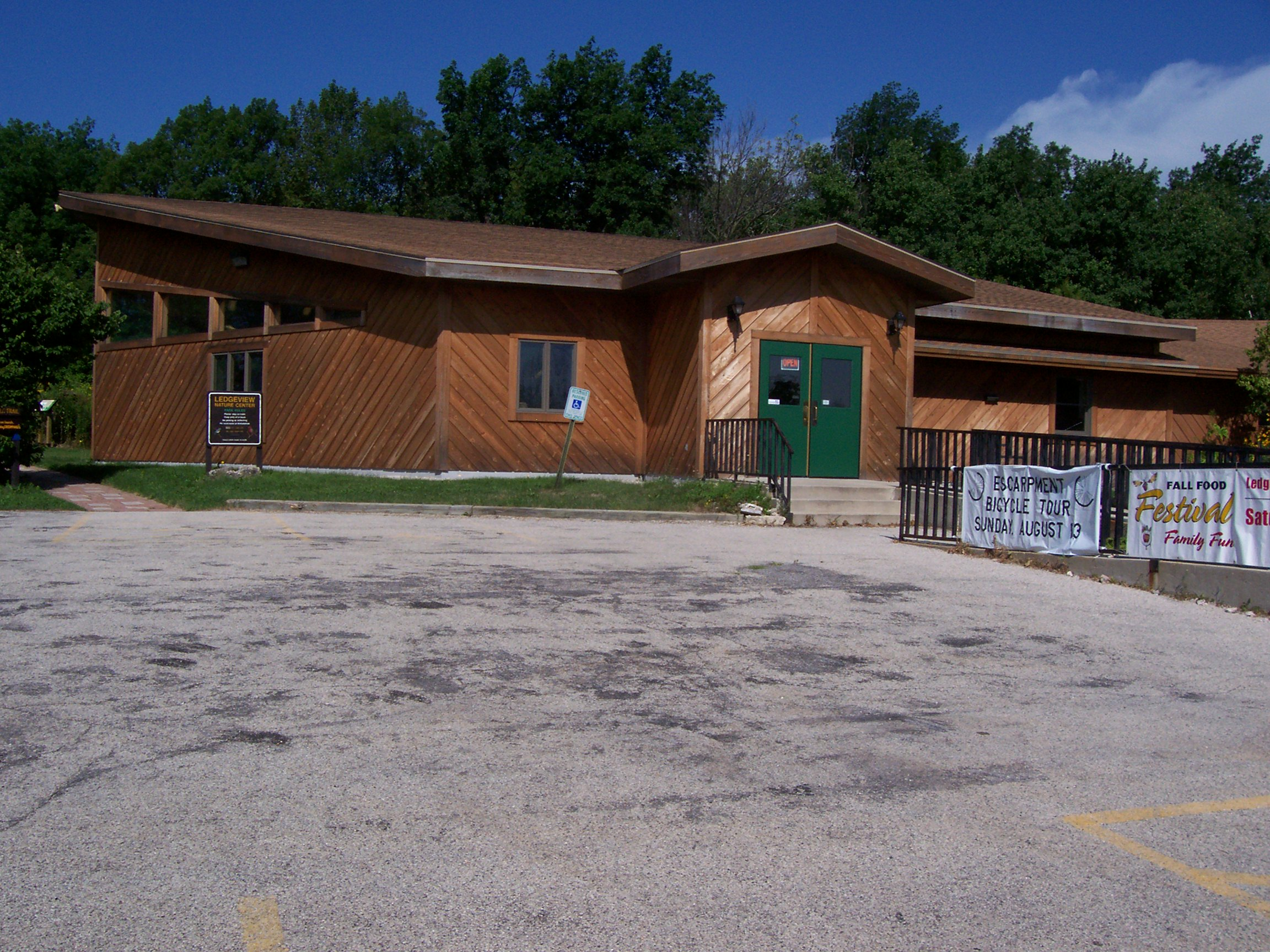
- Interactive map of Ledge View Nature Center
- Type: Park and Nature center
- Location: W2348 Short Rd; Chilton, Wisconsin
- Coordinates: 44.0016°N 88.15538°W
- Area: 105 acres (42 ha)
- Created: 1969
- Operator: Calumet County Parks system
- Hiking trails: 2.5 miles (4.0 km)
- Website: www.ledgeviewnaturecenter.org

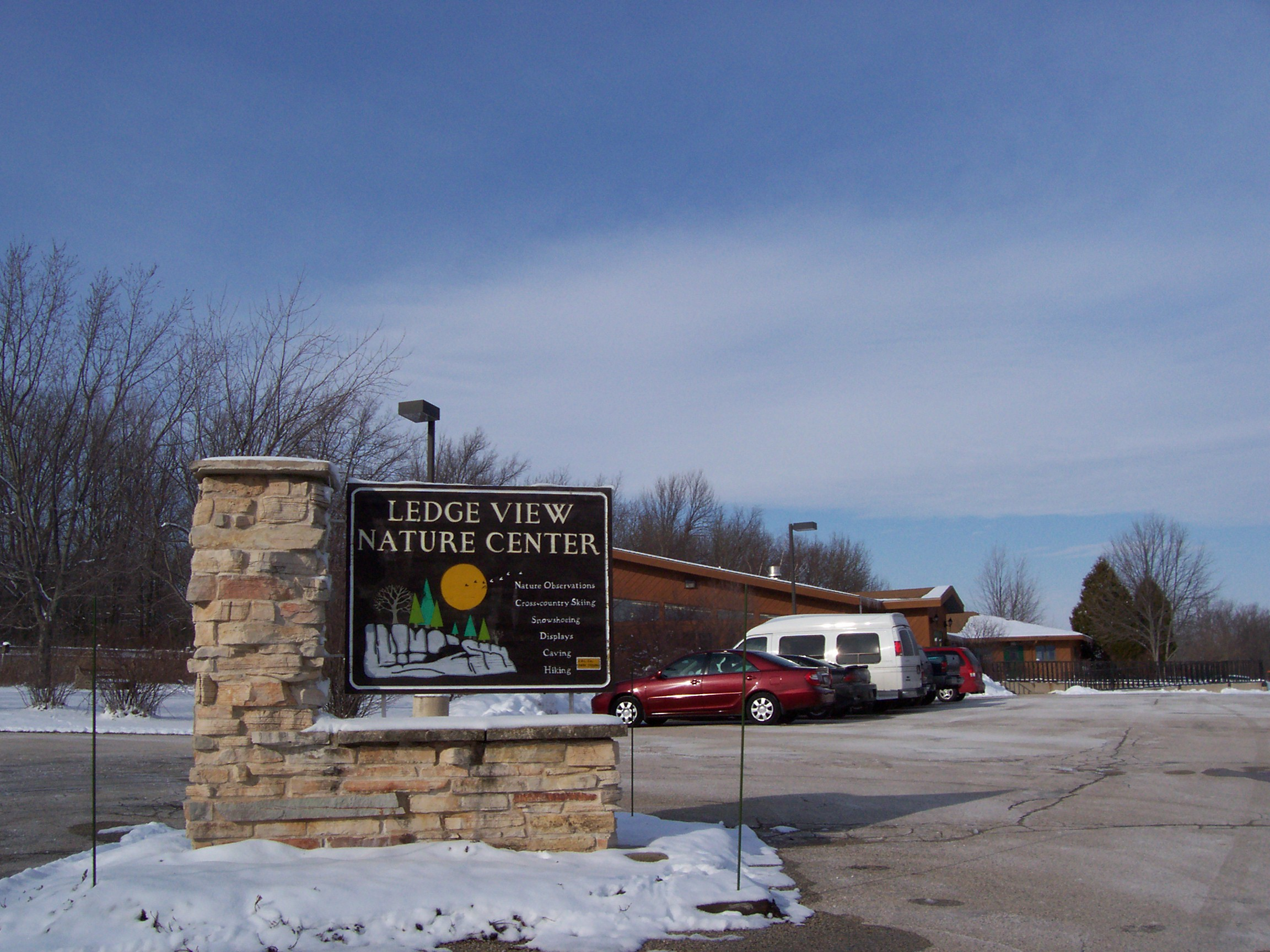
Sign

Ledge View Nature Center is a 105-acre (0.42 km^{2}) park and interpretive center. It is located two miles (3 km) south of Chilton, Wisconsin. The facility is part of the Calumet County Parks system operated by Calumet County.

The park features 2.5 miles (4.0 km) of hiking and cross country ski trails through field and forest; a 60-foot (18 m) observation tower; an arboretum; a butterfly garden; a rain garden; prairie; three natural solution dolomite caves accessible only by guided tour; and a quarry. The Ledge Views caves are one of two publicly owned park systems accessible in eastern Wisconsin with the other being Cherney Maribel Caves County Park in neighboring Manitowoc County, Wisconsin.

The nature center offers school programs in caving, sedimentary geology, maple syruping, and winter ecology on traditional wood-framed snowshoes. It also has exhibits which explain the geology of the area, including the drumlins and the Niagara Escarpment. The interpretive center has interactive exhibits on lake sturgeon, birds, bats of Wisconsin, and the Niagara Escarpment, in addition to some live animals.

== History ==
The site was purchased from Zimmermann in 1969. The nature center was built in 1981, and an addition was constructed in 1986. In 1998 the Frisch Family exhibit hall was constructed.

== See also ==
- List of botanical gardens and arboretums in Wisconsin

Other caves on the Niagara Escarpment

- Cherney Maribel Caves County Park (also has caves open to tours)
- Door Peninsula § Caves and sinkholes
- Spider Cave
