= St. John Mine =

Historic place in Wisconsin, United States

- U.S. National Register of Historic Places
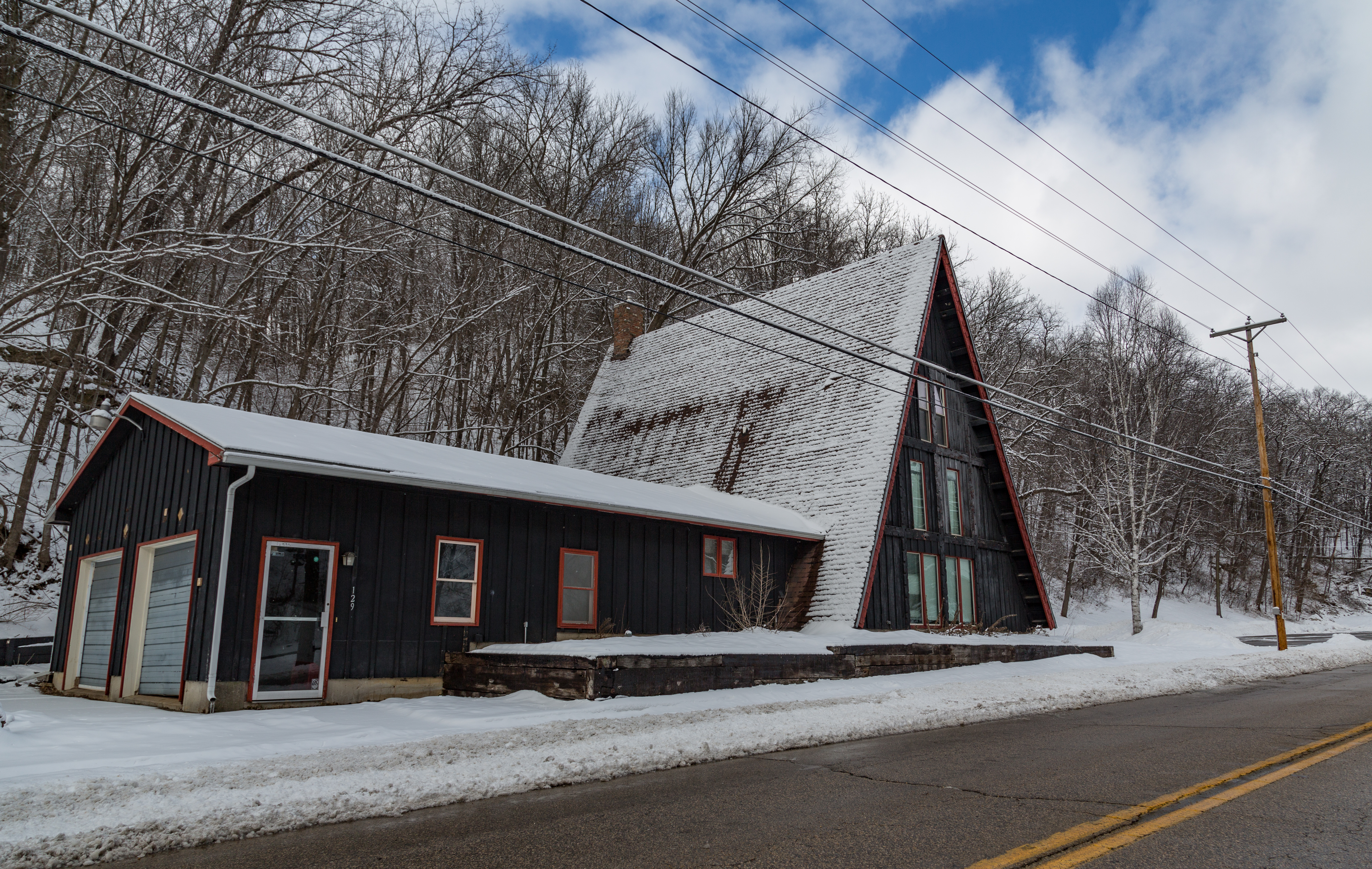
- The mine visitor center in 2016

- Location within Wisconsin Location within the United States
- Location: 129 South Main Street; Potosi, Wisconsin 53820
- Coordinates: 42°41′12″N 90°42′55″W
- NRHP reference No.: 79000079
- Added to NRHP: June 4, 1979

The St. John Mine is located in Potosi, Wisconsin. It was added to the National Register of Historic Places in 1979.

== History ==
Once a natural cave, Native Americans mined lead out of the site before Wisconsin's "lead rush" in 1827. The first non-Native American to work at the mine was Willis St. John. The mine is privately owned and tours are no longer available.
