= Fayette Historic State Park =

Park in Michigan, USA

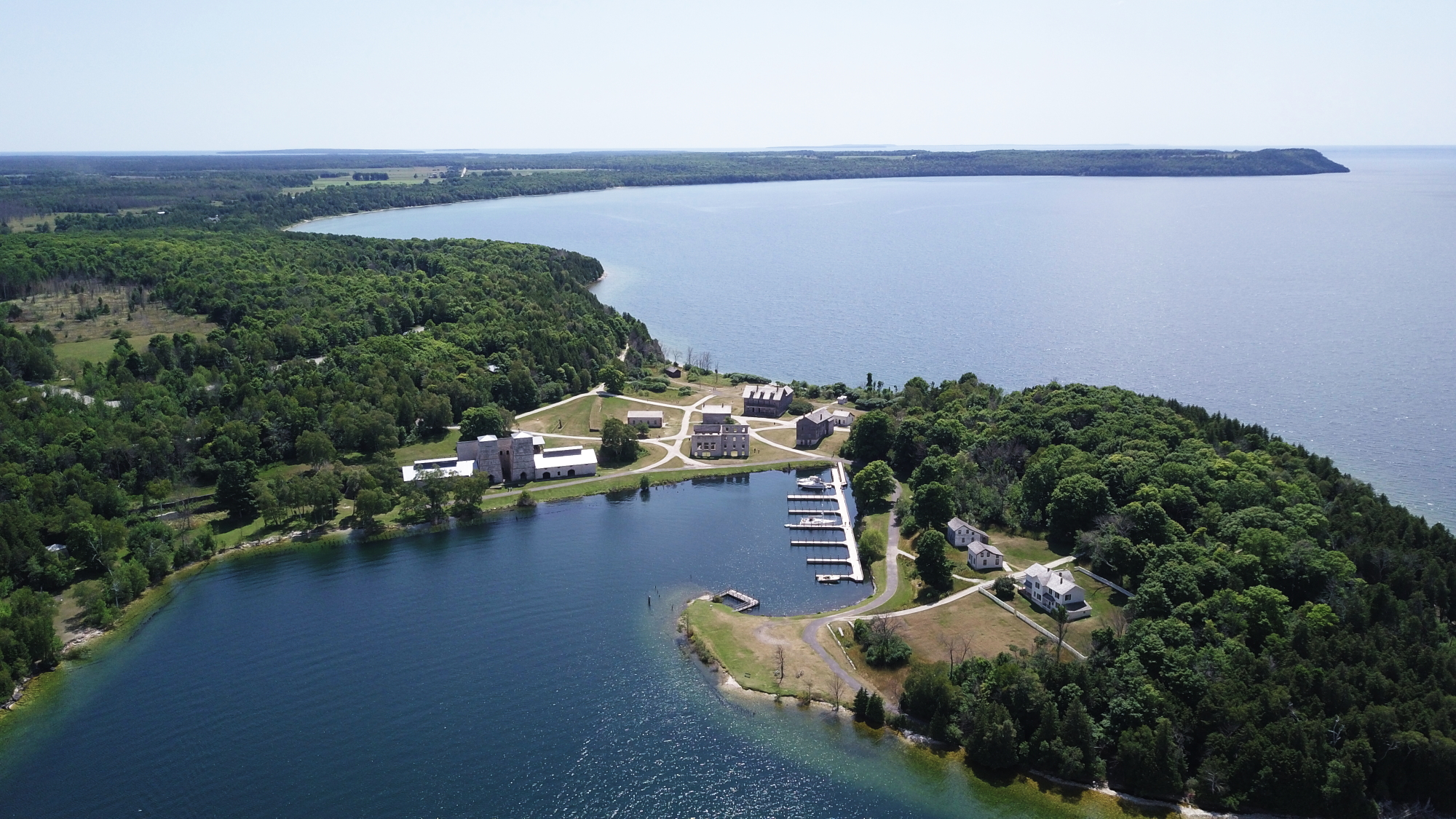
- The historic townsite seen from above Snail Shell Harbor

- Location within Michigan Location within the United States
- Location: Fairbanks Township, Delta County, Michigan, United States
- Coordinates: 45°43′02″N 86°40′04″W
- Area: 850 acres (340 ha)
- Elevation: 650 feet (200 m)
- Established: 1959
- Administrator: Michigan Department of Natural Resources
- Designation: Michigan state park
- Website: Official website
- Fayette Historic State Park
- U.S. National Register of Historic Places
- Michigan State Historic Site
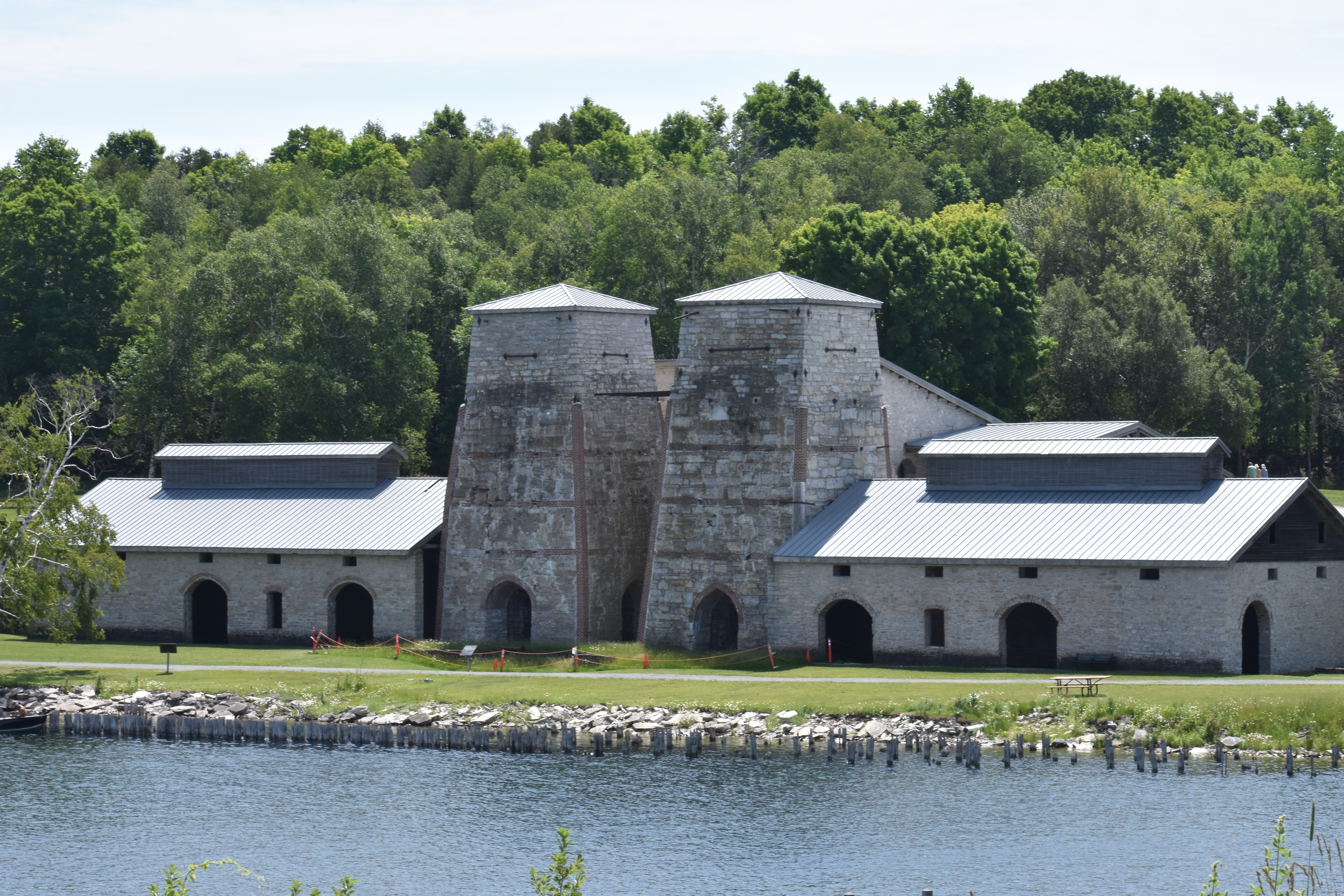
- The blast furnace complex
- Built: 1867
- NRHP reference No.: 70000269

Significant dates
- Added to NRHP: February 16, 1970
- Designated MSHS: August 23, 1956

Fayette Historic State Park is a historic preservation and public recreation area encompassing the historic town of Fayette in the U.S. state of Michigan. It is located on the Big Bay de Noc of Lake Michigan, between Snail Shell Harbor and Sand Bay, on the southern side of the Upper Peninsula, about 17 miles south of US 2. Fayette was the site of an industrial community that manufactured charcoal pig iron between 1867 and 1891. The town has been reconstructed into a living museum, showing what life was like in this town in the late 19th century. It was listed on the National Register of Historic Places in 1970.

== History ==
Fayette was once one of the Upper Peninsula's most productive iron-smelting operations. Fayette grew up around two blast furnaces, a large dock, and several charcoal kilns, following the post-Civil War need for iron. Nearly 500 residents—many of them immigrants from Canada, the British Isles, and northern Europe—lived in and near the town that existed to make pig iron. During 24 years of operation Fayette's blast furnaces produced a total of 229,288 tons of iron, using local hardwood forests for fuel and quarrying limestone from the bluffs to purify the iron ore. When the charcoal iron market began to decline, the Jackson Iron Company closed its Fayette smelting operations in 1891.

Another event leading to the demise of the Jackson Iron Company was the use of the hardwoods and limestone to purify the iron, leading to the exhaustion of hardwoods in the area. This was the main source for purifying the iron and therefore led to the decline of the Jackson Iron Company.

After shutting down operations, all but about 20 residents left Fayette in search of employment elsewhere, though some chose to stay nearby, subsisting on farming and fishing.

Because of the closing of smelting operations, the town became a resort and fishing village. In 1916, it was purchased by a wealthy individual and turned into a summer resort. It continued in that capacity until 1946 when another individual purchased it, who eventually fell behind on taxes. Lastly, it was purchased by the Escanaba Paper Company, and was swapped to the Michigan government for timberland. As a result, Fayette became a state park in 1959.

A group of Northern White Cedar trees growing on the cliffs above Lake Michigan in the park are estimated to be more than 1,400 years old, making them the oldest known trees in Michigan and among the oldest known trees in the world.

== Fayette Historic Townsite ==
Fayette Historic Townsite is a seasonally open living history museum with restored buildings that visitors may enter to learn about life in the late 19th century. Facilities include a visitors center and museum store.

== Activities and amenities ==
The park offers 61 campsites and one rental lodge, swimming beach, picnic area, boat launch, fishing pier, and playground. The park has 5 miles (8.0 km) of trails for hiking and cross-country skiing. Trails wind through a hardwood forest and throughout the historic townsite. The scenic overlook trail ascends dolomite cliffs that are part of the Niagara Escarpment.

== See also ==
- National Register of Historic Places listings in Delta County, Michigan
- Spider Cave: An archaeological site within the park.
