= Garden Peninsula =

Peninsula in Michigan, United States of America

Coordinates: 45°42′N 86°38′W

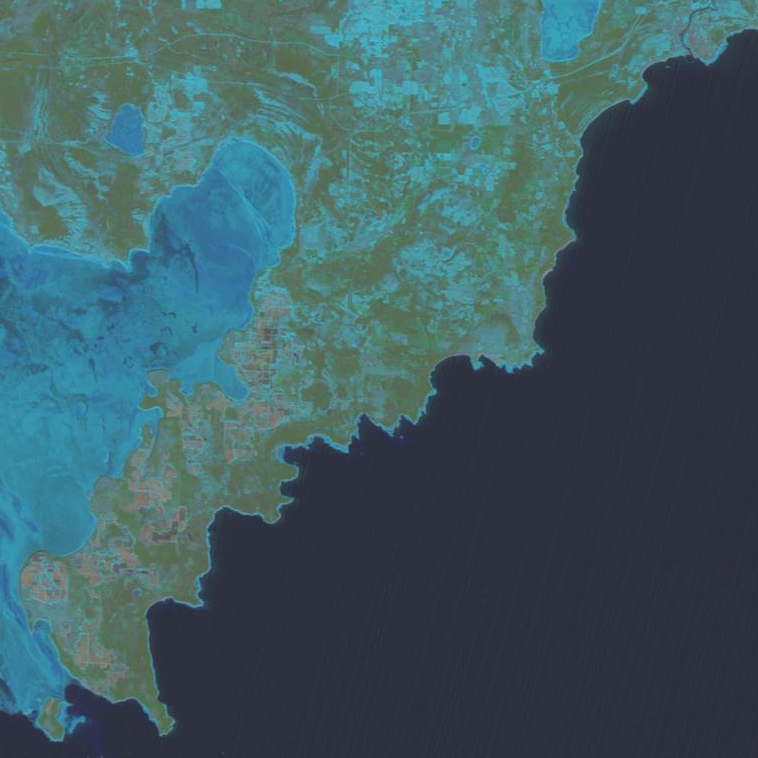
Resourcesat-2 satellite photo taken on March 20, 2022; ice-covered water is light blue, dark area is open water

The Garden Peninsula (Ojibwe: Gitigaaneyaashikaaniing) is a peninsula of 22 miles (35 km) in length that extends southwestward into Lake Michigan from the mainland of Michigan's Upper Peninsula. The peninsula is bordered by Lake Michigan on the east, and by Big Bay de Noc on the west. The base of the peninsula is served by U.S. Highway 2, and the peninsula's west shore is reached by M-183. The largest settlement on the peninsula is the village of Garden.

Many of the peninsula's hardwoods were cut down for use in the charcoal-fired iron furnaces operated by the Jackson Iron Company in 1867–1891 at what is now Fayette State Park, on the peninsula's western shore. With its access to Great Lakes shipping, the remaining lumber of the Garden Peninsula was largely logged by the 1890s. However, the area is still home to endemic plants and disjunct populations.

After the conclusion of the old-growth logging era, homesteaders tried to develop an agricultural economy on the cleared land; but these efforts largely failed in the 20th century, the main exceptions being fruit such as strawberries. Much of the peninsula reverted to second-growth woodland within the Lake Superior State Forest.

Most of the peninsula is part of Delta County, although a small portion in the east is part of Schoolcraft County.

== Formation ==
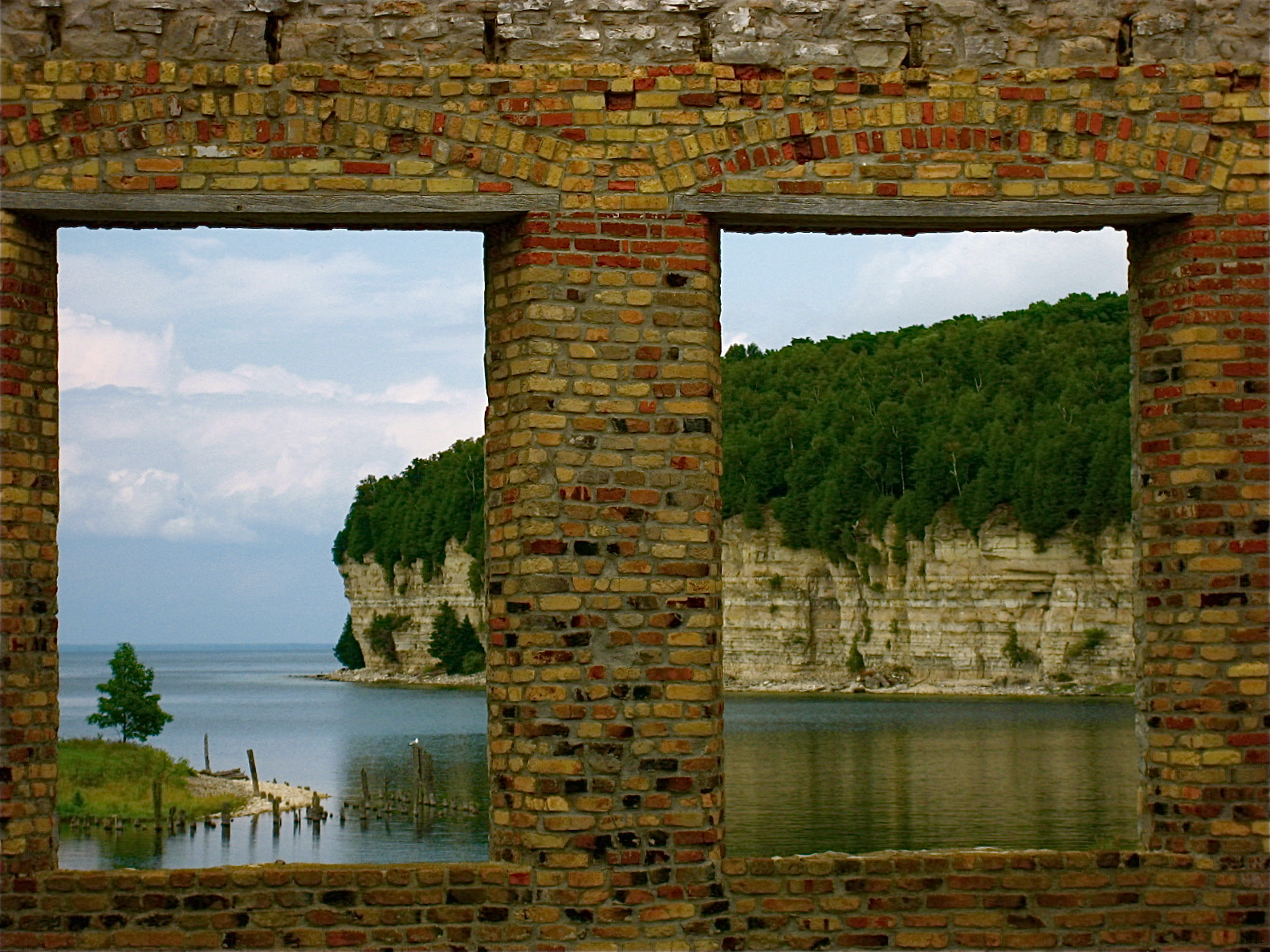
A view of the escarpment's limestone cliffs at Fayette Historic Townsite. Cliffs like these are rare on Lake Michigan.

The Garden Peninsula is part of the western sill of limestone bedrock of the Niagara Escarpment. The other surviving portion of the sill is now Wisconsin's Door Peninsula. Parts of the limestone sill between the Door and Garden peninsulas have been eroded away by glaciers. An archipelago of islands south of the Garden Peninsula spans the gap between the two peninsulas, and hems in Green Bay, Lake Michigan's largest bay, to the west. The Garden Peninsula's line of limestone hills reaches as high as 165 feet (56 m) above the water at Burnt Bluff south of Fayette.

The island-strewn waters around the Garden Peninsula continue to yield a harvest of freshwater fish. One of the peninsula's largest bays, Gillnet Haven Bay southeast of Fayette on the peninsula's eastern shore, commemorates the gill nets used by Lake Michigan's Native American fishermen.

== Settlements ==
- Fairport
- Fayette
- Garden
- Garden Corners
- Thompson
