= Fairbanks Township, Michigan =

- Civil township
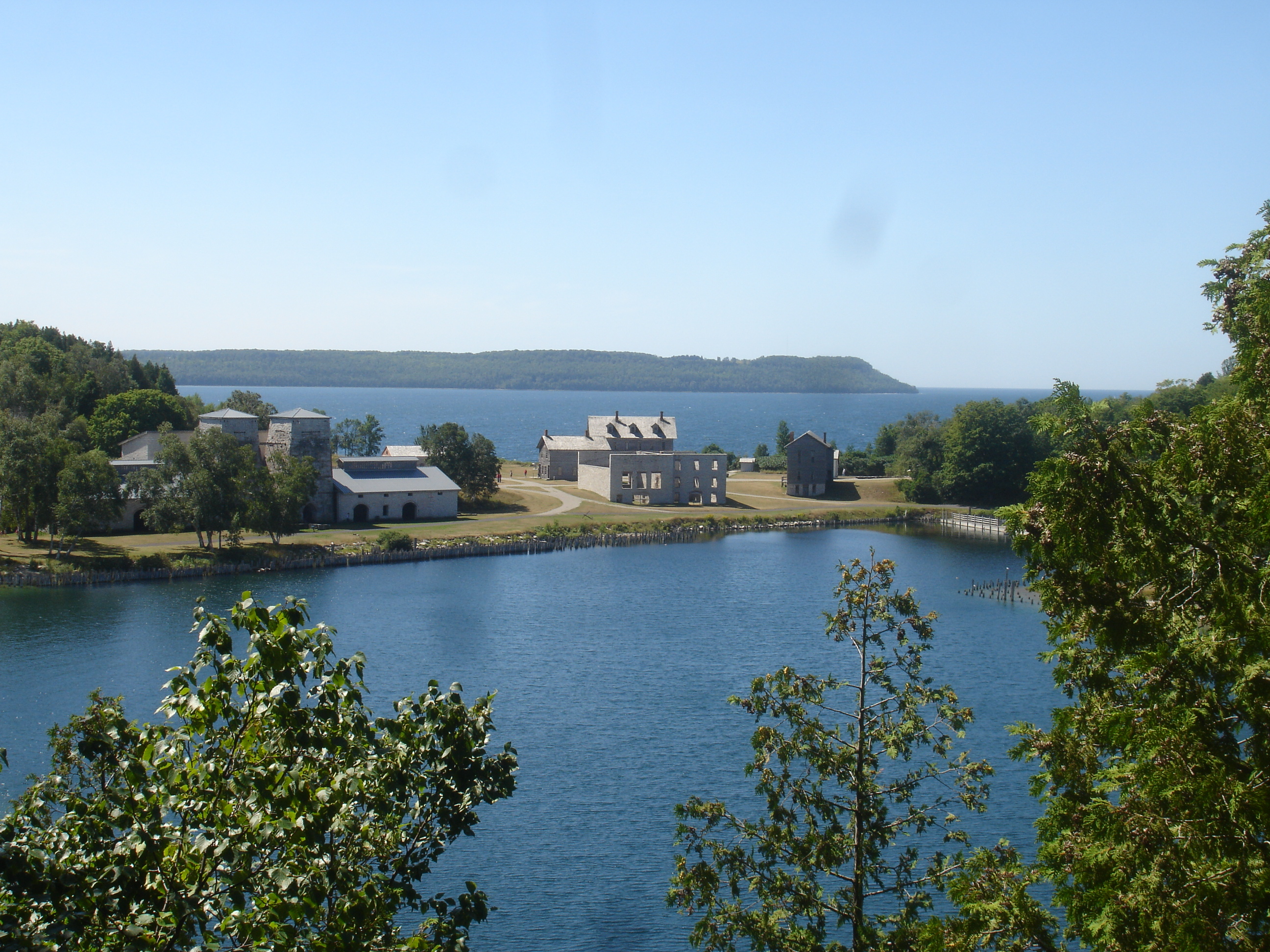
- Fayette Historic State Park within Fairbanks Township along Big Bay de Noc

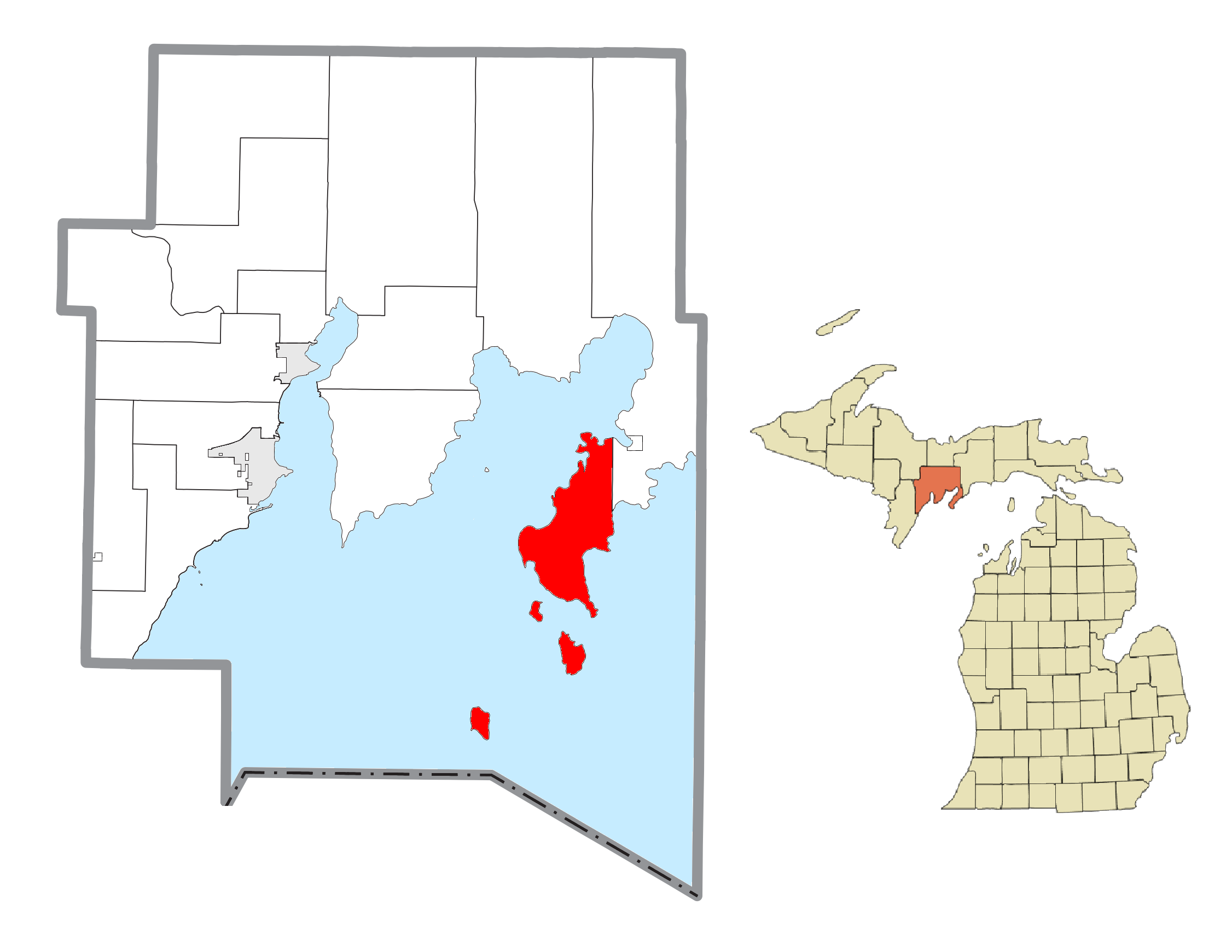
- Location within Delta County

- Location within the state of Michigan Fairbanks Township (the United States)
- Coordinates: 45°41′11″N 86°39′26″W
- Country: United States
- State: Michigan
- County: Delta

Government
  - Supervisor: Ron Collins

Area
  - Total: 299.2 sq mi (775.0 km^{2})
  - Land: 47.2 sq mi (122.2 km^{2})
  - Water: 252.0 sq mi (652.8 km^{2})
- Elevation: 581 ft (177 m)

Population (2020)
  - Total: 297
  - Density: 6.29/sq mi (2.43/km^{2})
- Time zone: UTC-5 (Eastern (EST))
  - Summer (DST): UTC-4 (EDT)
- ZIP code(s): 49835
- Area code: 906
- FIPS code: 26-26960
- GNIS feature ID: 1625139

Fairbanks Township is a civil township of Delta County in the U.S. state of Michigan. As of the 2020 census, the township population was 297, up from 281 at the 2010 census.

== Communities ==
- Fayette is an unincorporated community on the eastern shore of the Big Bay de Noc which opens into Green Bay on Lake Michigan at 45°43′03″N 86°40′04″W. It is at the southern terminus of M-183 about eight miles south of Garden within Fayette Historic State Park. It was created around an iron smelter in 1867.
- Fairport is an unincorporated community at the southern end of the Garden Peninsula at 45°37′16″N 86°39′30″W. It is approximately six miles south of Fayette on Delta County Road 483, the locally maintained extension of M-183. It was founded in 1886 by fishermen who had relocated from St. Martin Island.

== History ==
In 1867, the Jackson Iron Company had Fayette Brown build a charcoal iron smelter at Fayette, which grew up around the smelter and named after Brown. A Fayette post office opened on September 13, 1870 with Marvin H. Brown as postmaster. In 1891, the smelter was dismantled.

Fairport was founded in 1886 by fishermen who had relocated from St. Martin Island. The community was a commercial fishing port.

Fayette continued on as a small resort community until the mid-1950s, and then became a state park in 1959.

== Geography ==
According to the United States Census Bureau, the township has a total area of 299.2 square miles (775 km^{2}), of which 47.2 square miles (122 km^{2}) is land and 252.0 square miles (653 km^{2}) (84.23%) is water. The northern Potawatomi Islands are in Fairbanks Township, while the southern Potawatomi Islands are in the town of Washington in Door County, Wisconsin. Part of St. Martin Island is owned by the Little Traverse Bay Bands of Odawa Indians as a Tribal Trust Land.

=== Climate ===
Burnt Bluff (on the west side, south of Sand Bay)

Climate chart (precipitation, max. and min. temperature)
J	F	M	A	M	J	J	A	S	O	N	D
63 −8 −12	52 −11 −14	55 −4 −6	78 4 −1	63 11 3	91 14 9	113 18 13	74 17 15	118 16 15	118 7 4	104 6 4	64 2 −2
- █ Average max. and min. temperatures in °C
- █ Precipitation totals in mm
Imperial conversion
J	F	M	A	M	J	J	A	S	O	N	D
2.5 18 10	2 12 7	2.2 25 21	3.1 39 30	2.5 52 37	3.6 57 48	4.4 64 55	2.9 63 59	4.6 61 59	4.6 45 39	4.1 43 39	2.5 36 28
- █ Average max. and min. temperatures in °F
- █ Precipitation totals in inches

== Demographics ==
As of the census of 2000, there were 321 people, 143 households, and 93 families residing in the township. The population density was 6.8 inhabitants per square mile (2.6/km^{2}). There were 267 housing units at an average density of 5.7 per square mile (2.2/km^{2}). The racial makeup of the township was 91.59% White, 4.98% Native American, 0.31% Asian, and 3.12% from two or more races.

There were 143 households, out of which 19.6% had children under the age of 18 living with them, 56.6% were married couples living together, 7.0% had a female householder with no husband present, and 34.3% were non-families. 30.1% of all households were made up of individuals, and 14.0% had someone living alone who was 65 years of age or older. The average household size was 2.24 and the average family size was 2.76.

In the township the population was spread out, with 15.6% under the age of 18, 6.9% from 18 to 24, 24.9% from 25 to 44, 31.2% from 45 to 64, and 21.5% who were 65 years of age or older. The median age was 47 years. For every 100 females, there were 100.6 males. For every 100 females age 18 and over, there were 100.7 males.

The median income for a household in the township was $24,643, and the median income for a family was $32,500. Males had a median income of $28,214 versus $25,417 for females. The per capita income for the township was $15,327. About 14.0% of families and 12.3% of the population were below the poverty line, including 12.0% of those under age 18 and 12.3% of those age 65 or over.

== Notable residents ==
- Professional football player Lynn Chandnois was born in Fayette. An All-American at Michigan State University, he played from 1950 to 1956 for the Pittsburgh Steelers.
