= Big Bay de Noc =

Bay in Delta County, Michigan, USA

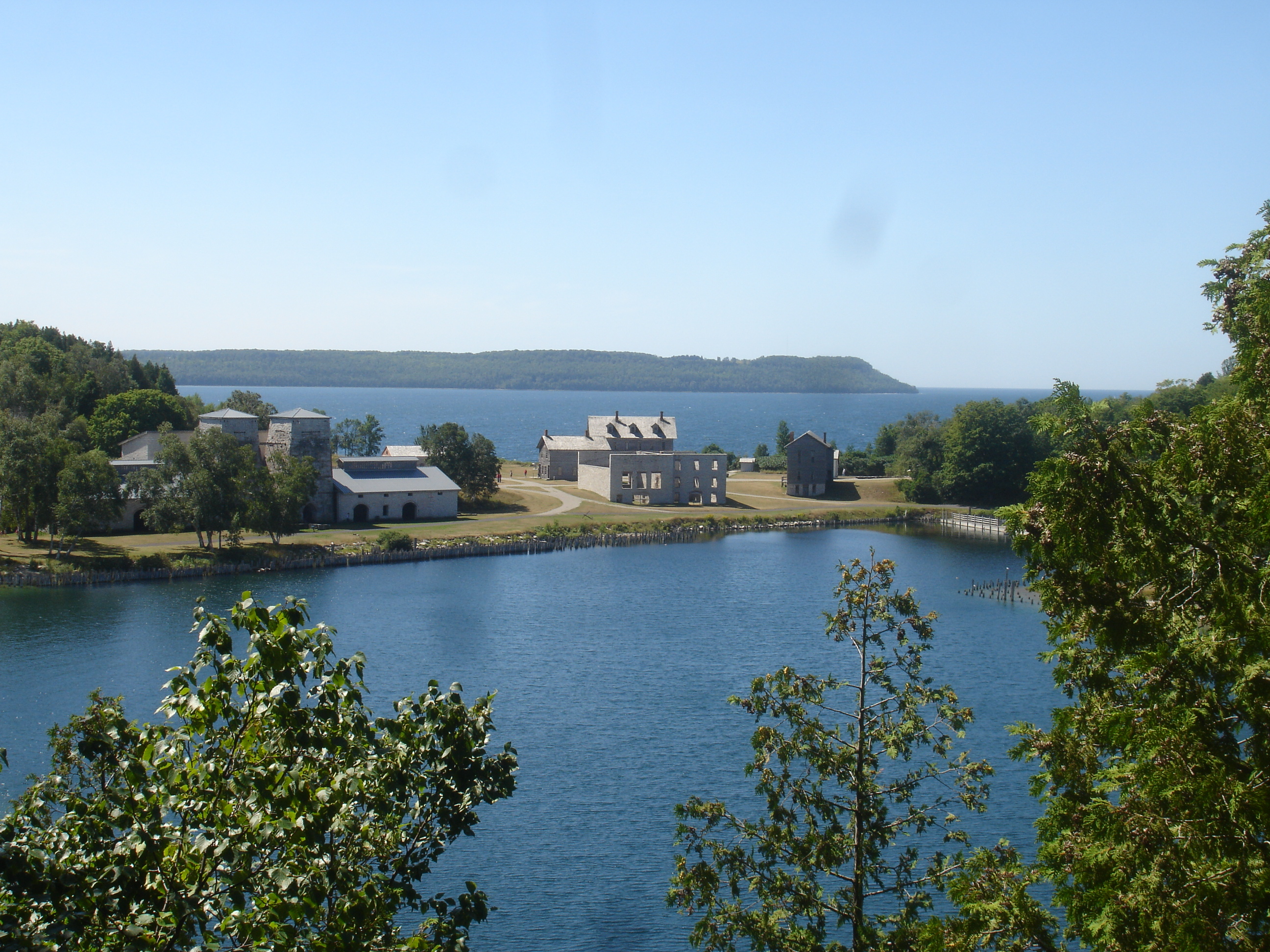
- In the foreground is Snail Shell Harbor and in the background is Sand Bay, both of which are bays of Big Bay de Noc.

- Location within Michigan Location within the United States
- Coordinates: 45°47′N 86°42′W
- Type: Bay
- Surface elevation: 581 feet (177 m)

Big Bay de Noc (/ˈnɔːk/ NAWK) is a bay in the Upper Peninsula of the U.S. state of Michigan. The bay, which opens into Lake Michigan's Green Bay, is enclosed by Delta County. The Garden Peninsula is on the east side of the bay and the Stonington Peninsula is on the west side. The small settlements of Garden and Nahma are harbors on the shore of the bay.

As with the more thickly-settled Little Bay de Noc, the bay's name comes from the Noquet (or Noc), a Native American tribe indigenous to the Upper Peninsula who once lived along the shores. Former names for the bay as seen in 18th and 19th century colonial maps were Grand Bay de Noquet, Great Noquet Bay, and Big Bay des Noquets.

The bay is historically important for its 19th-century use as a center of the Lake Michigan iron smelting industry. A former smelting complex has been preserved as Fayette State Park. The state park's Snail Shell Harbor, off Big Bay de Noc, offers a harbor of refuge for small boats and yachts. A lighthouse, the Peninsula Point Light, marks the entrance of the bay.

== Climate ==
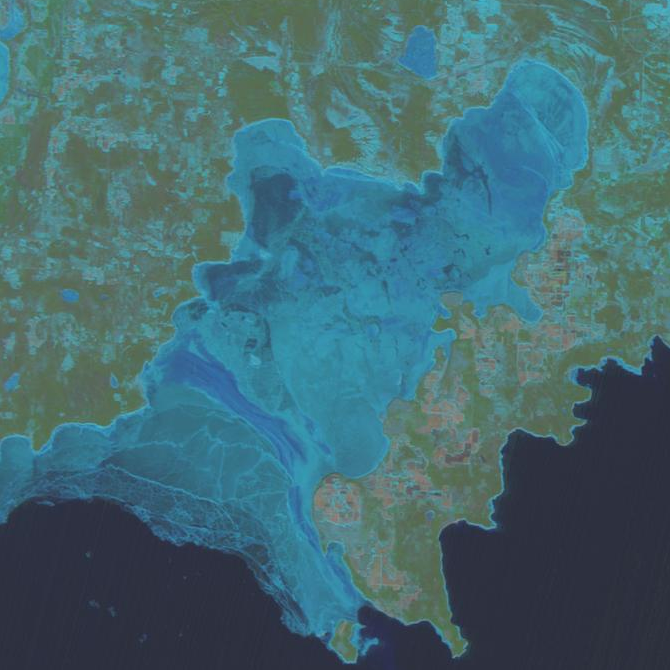
Taken by Resourcesat-2 on March 20, 2022

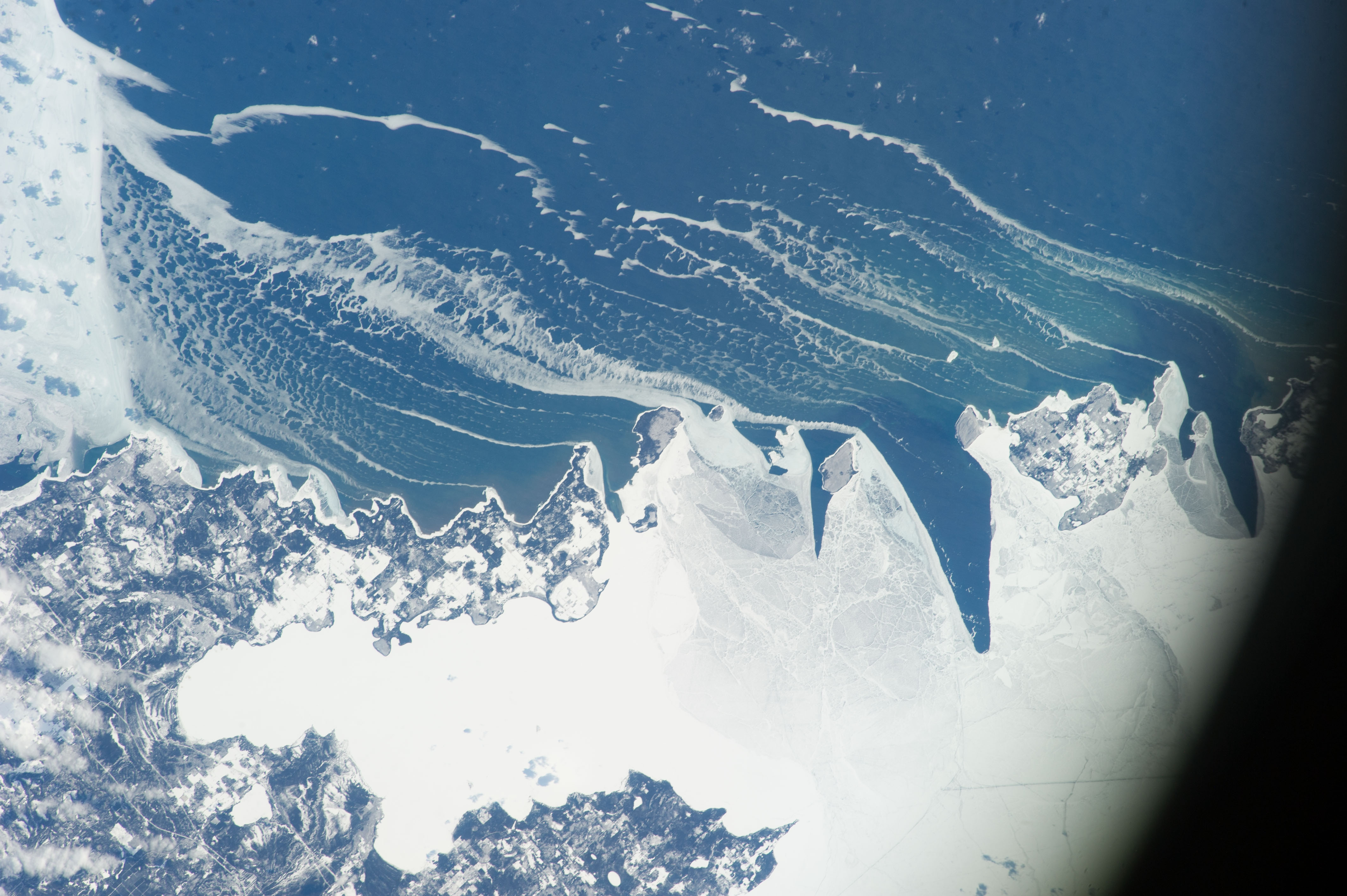
Taken from the International Space Station on February 22, 2014; view oriented so that the top of the image looks southeast

Big Bay de Noc

Climate chart (precipitation, max. and min. temperature)
J	F	M	A	M	J	J	A	S	O	N	D
63 −10 −15	52 −13 −18	55 −4 −8	78 4 −1	63 11 6	91 12 11	113 20 16	74 18 16	118 16 15	118 9 6	104 6 2	64 −1 −4
- █ Average max. and min. temperatures in °C
- █ Precipitation totals in mm
Imperial conversion
J	F	M	A	M	J	J	A	S	O	N	D
2.5 14 5	2 9 0	2.2 25 18	3.1 39 30	2.5 52 43	3.6 54 52	4.4 68 61	2.9 64 61	4.6 61 59	4.6 48 43	4.1 43 36	2.5 30 25
- █ Average max. and min. temperatures in °F
- █ Precipitation totals in inches
