= DeYoung Family Zoo =

- Interactive map of DeYoung Family Zoo
- 45.30793°N 87.644913°W
- Date opened: 1990
- Location: Wallace, Michigan
- No. of animals: 450
- No. of species: 125
- Owner: Bud DeYoung, Carrie Cramer
- Website: thedeyoungfamilyzoo.com

The DeYoung Family Zoo is a zoo that opened to the public in 1990, open yearly from May until the end of October. It is located in Wallace, in the Upper Peninsula of Michigan, United States, about 15 miles (24 km) north of Menominee. The zoo is owned by Bud DeYoung and Carrie Cramer. The facility has many exotic felines, and provides visitor interactions, as well as baby animals to pet and bottle feed.

== Animals ==
DeYoung and Cramer participate in rehabilitation of local species of animals including white-tailed deer, raccoons, and anything else that needs help. In 2008, the zoo successfully bred two endangered Siberian tigers, which produced a litter of four.

There have been questions regarding the care of the animals in the zoo in more recent years. A chimpanzee named Tommy was donated to the zoo in 2015 but the DeYoung Zoo denied having the chimp. Later, Tommy was indeed at the zoo but PETA had concerns about the conditions the Chimpanzee was in.

At least 50 animals have been misplaced by the DeYoung family zoo and the owners refused to provide answers and proof of where the exotic animals have disappeared.

== My Life is a Zoo ==
My Life is a Zoo is a television show on National Geographic Wild cable station, filmed at the DeYoung Family Zoo. Neil Genzlinger of The New York Times wrote that DeYoung and Cramer "should be commended for their exotic-animal rescues and abundant enthusiasm but perhaps not for their hygiene," citing an occasion in the series in which Cramer is seen kissing a hyena on the lips.
