= Upper Peninsula of Michigan =

Northern major peninsula of the U.S. state of Michigan

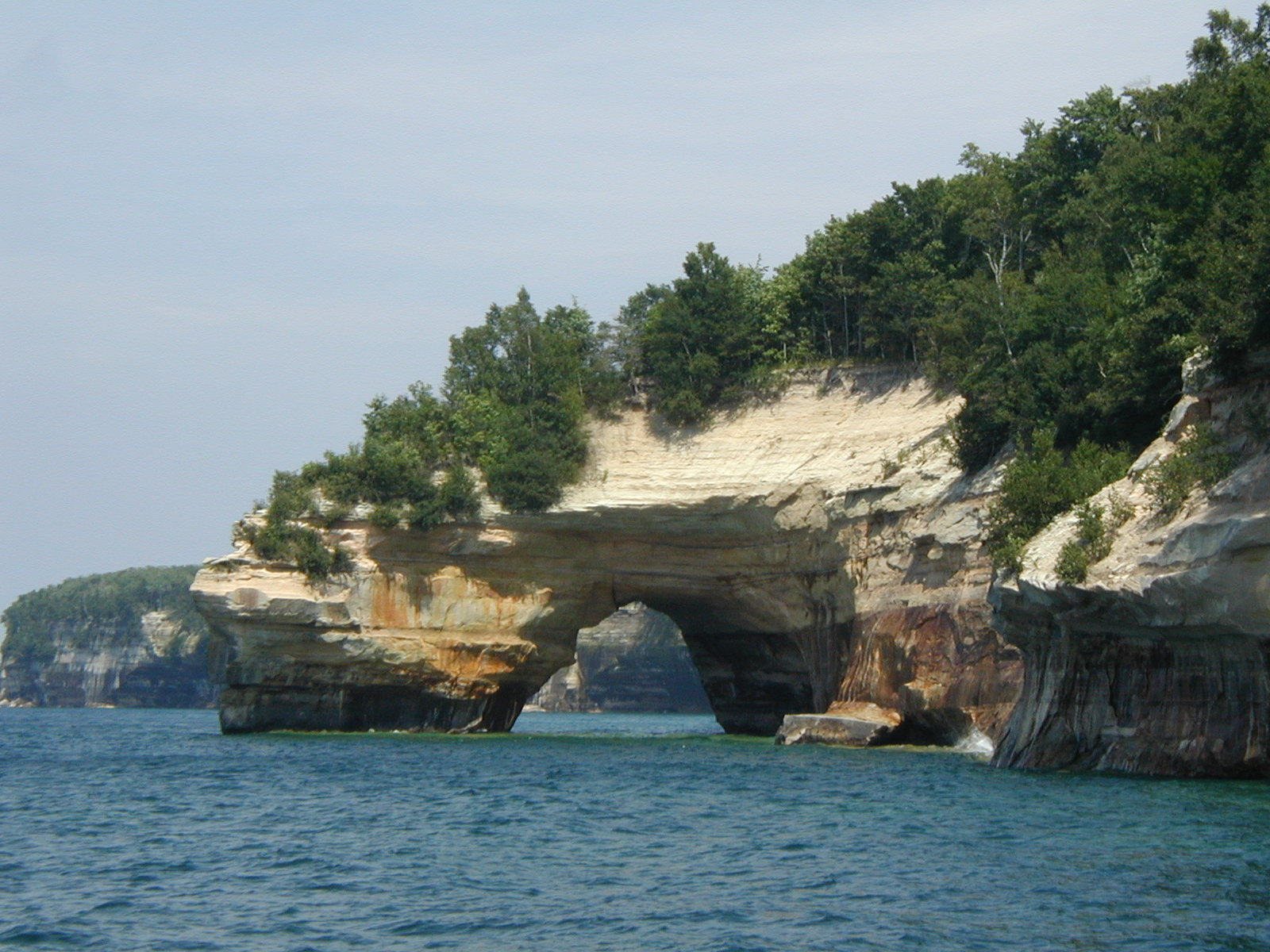
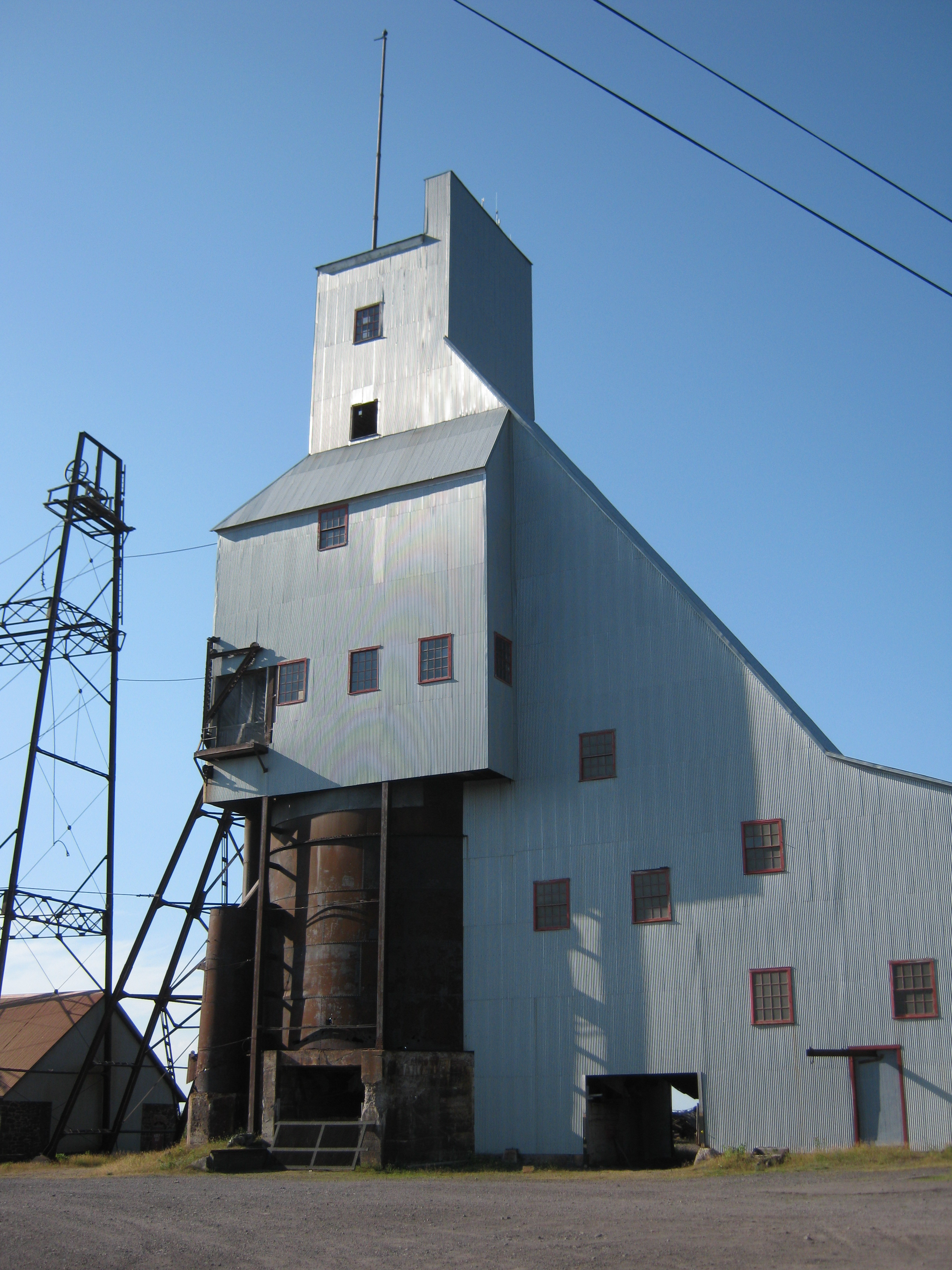
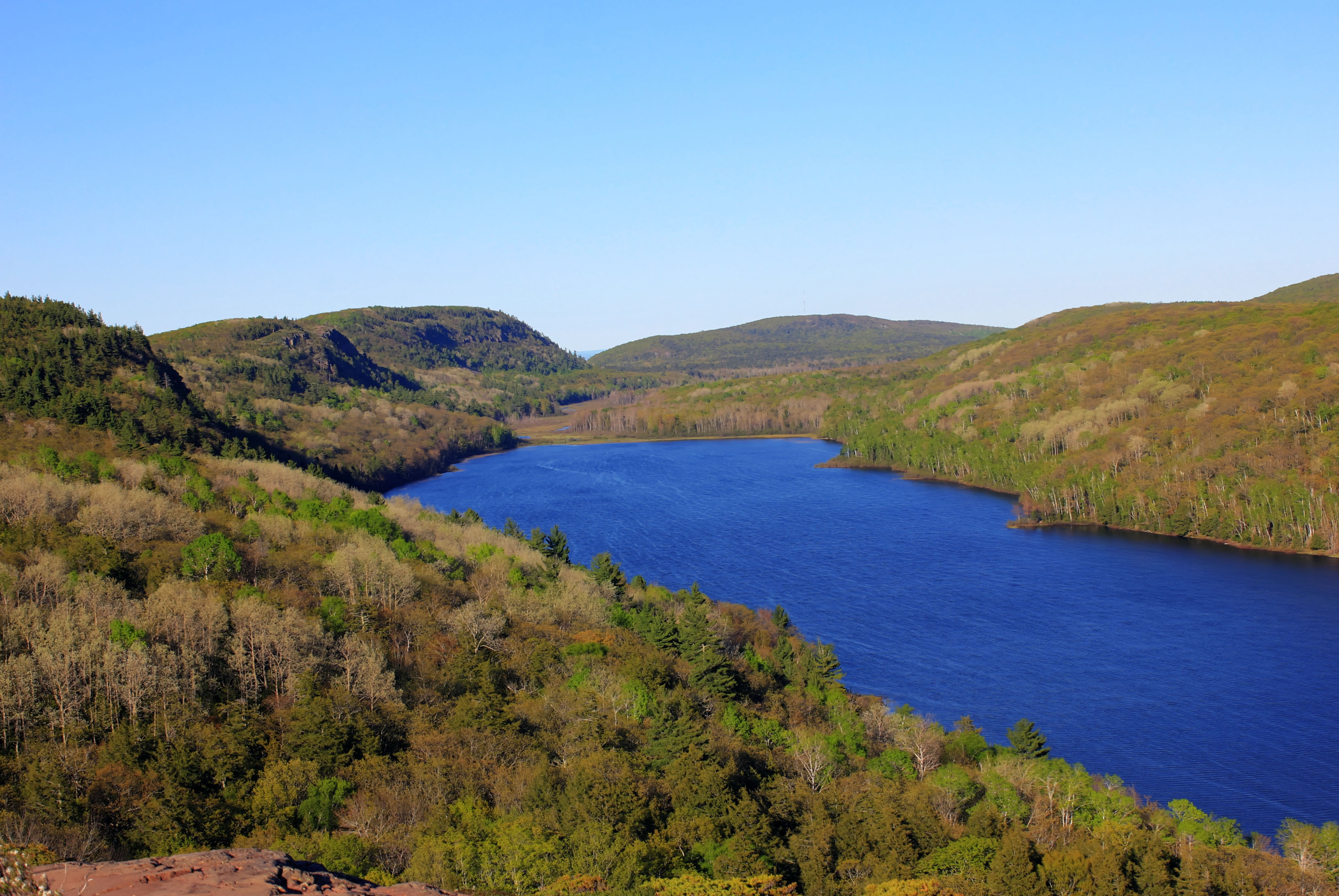
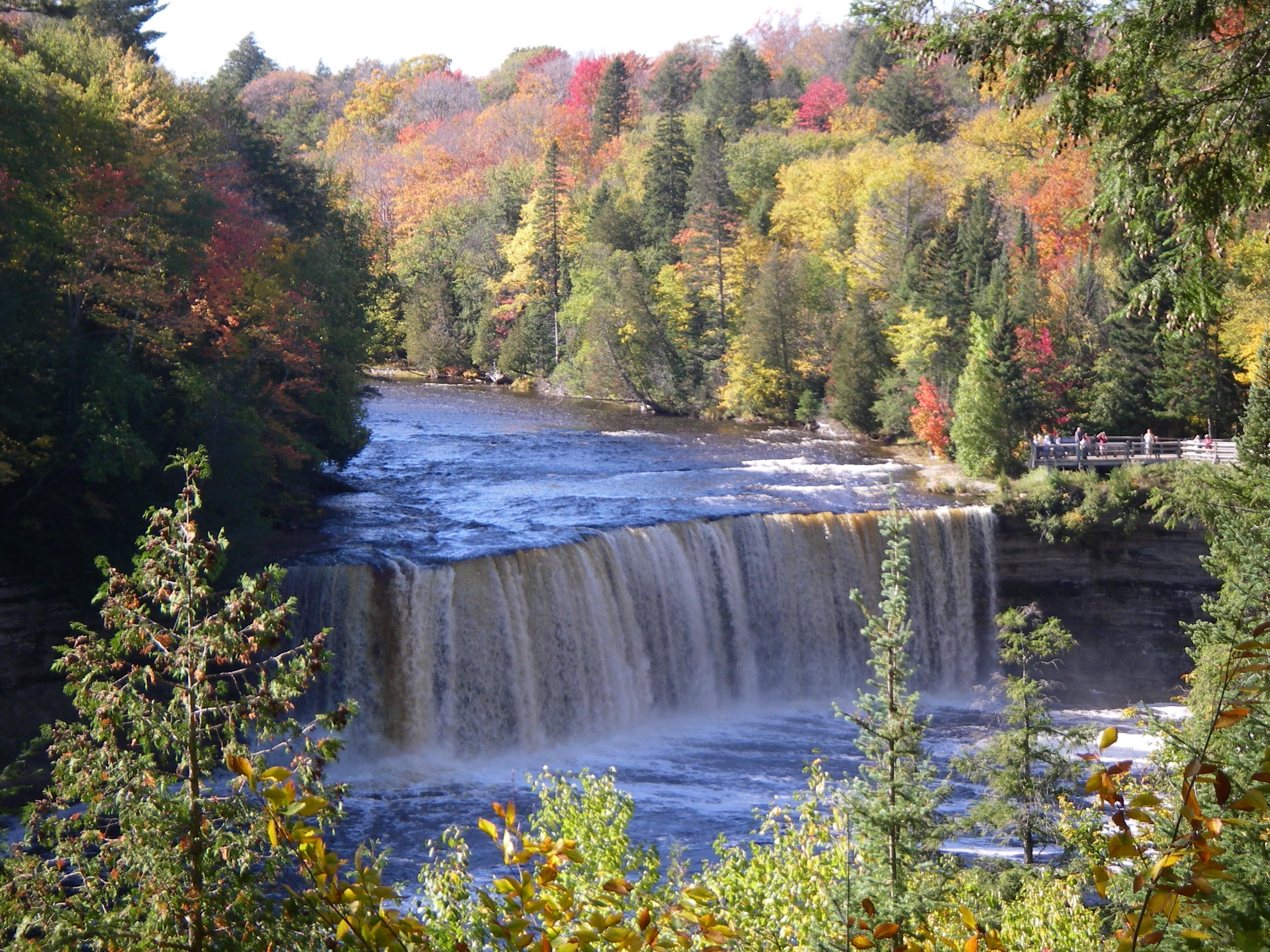
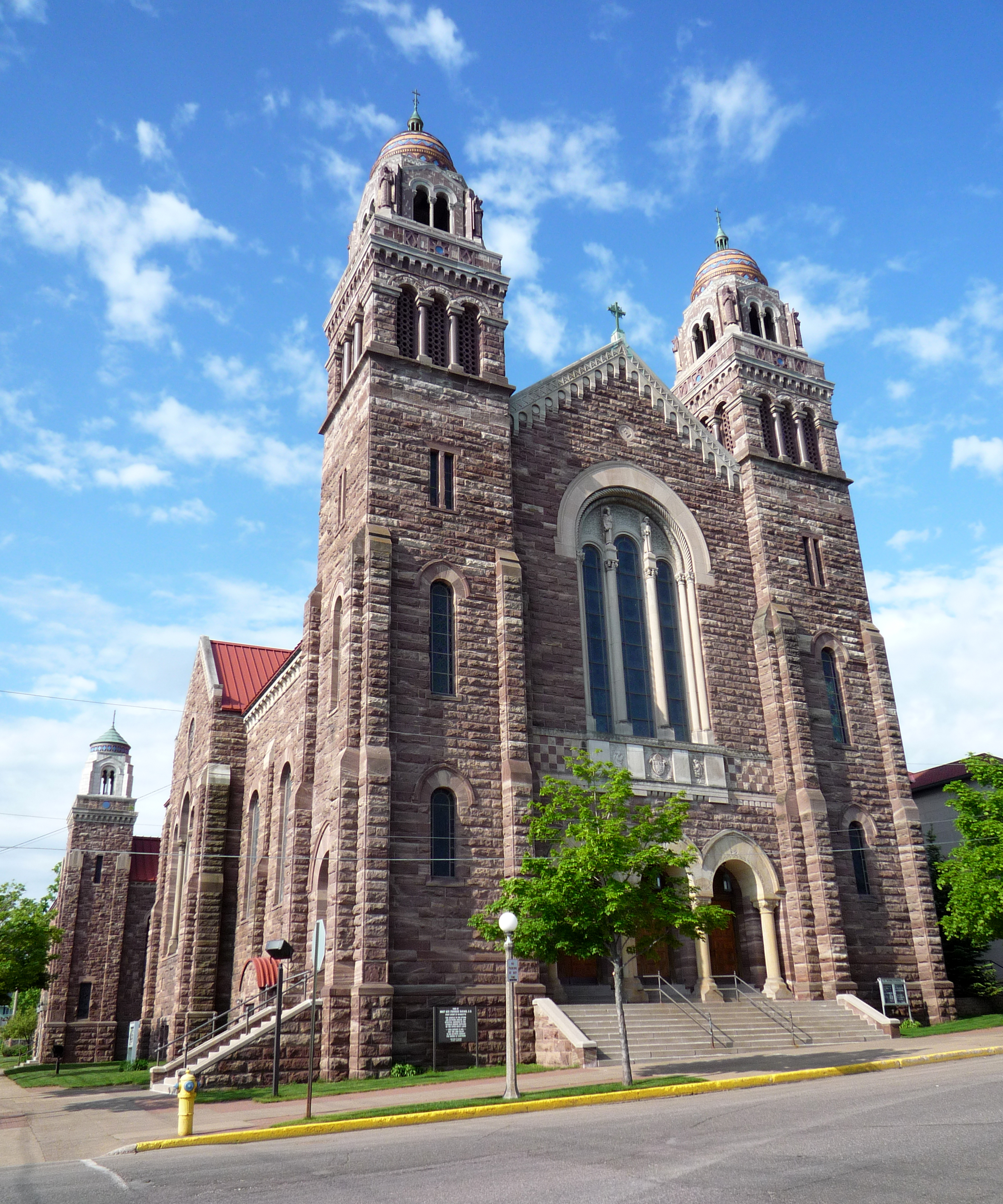
- Pictured Rocks National Lakeshore Quincy Mine Lake of the Clouds Tahquamenon Falls St. Peter Cathedral
- Nickname(s): "The U.P.", "The Yoop", "The 906"
- Coordinates: 46°15′N 87°00′W
- Country: United States
- State: Michigan
- Largest city: Marquette

Area
  - Total: 36,139 sq mi (93,600 km^{2})
  - Land: 16,378 sq mi (42,420 km^{2})
  - Water: 19,761 sq mi (51,180 km^{2}) 54.7%

Population (2020)
  - Total: 301,609
  - Density: 18.415/sq mi (7.1103/km^{2})
- Demonym: Yooper

Time zones
- Most of the Upper Peninsula: UTC−05:00 (Eastern)
  - Summer (DST): UTC−04:00 (EDT)
- Counties bordering Wisconsin: UTC−06:00 (Central)
  - Summer (DST): UTC−05:00 (CDT)
- Area code: 906 (Note: Bois Blanc Township in Mackinac County is considered part of the Upper Peninsula but uses the area code 231.)

The Upper Peninsula of Michigan (also known as Upper Michigan or colloquially the U.P. or Yoop) is the northern and more elevated of the two major landmasses that comprise the U.S. state of Michigan; it is separated from the Lower Peninsula by the Straits of Mackinac. It is bounded primarily by Lake Superior to the north, separated from the Canadian province of Ontario at the east end by the St. Marys River, and flanked by Lake Huron and Lake Michigan along much of its south. Although the peninsula as a geographic feature extends into the state of Wisconsin, the state boundary follows the Montreal and Menominee rivers with a line connecting them.

First inhabited by the Algonquian-speaking Anishinaabe for millennia, the peninsula was explored and occupied in the 17th century by French colonists, then annexed by British forces, before being ceded to the United States shortly after its independence. After being divided among various territorial jurisdictions, it was granted to the newly admitted state of Michigan as part of the settlement of a dispute with Ohio over the city of Toledo. The region's exploitable timber resources and the discovery of sizeable iron and copper deposits in the 19th century brought immigrants, especially those of Finnish, French Canadian, Swedish, Norwegian, Cornish, and Italian origin; the western portion of the peninsula includes the only counties in the United States where a plurality of residents claim Finnish ancestry. The area's economy declined in the mid-20th century after all the readily available minerals had been extracted, and has since become largely dependent on logging and tourism.

The Upper Peninsula comprises 29% of Michigan's land area and 3% of its total population; at the height of the mining and timber era in the early 20th century, it was home to as much as 11% of the state's population. Residents are nicknamed Yoopers (derived from "UP-ers") and are noted for their strong regional identity, enhanced by the perception that the economically and politically dominant Lower Peninsula neglects them. Proposals to establish the Upper Peninsula as a separate state have long been put forward, yet have failed to gain traction. Its largest cities are Marquette, Sault Ste. Marie, Escanaba, Menominee, Houghton, and Iron Mountain. Due to the surrounding waters and northern latitude, it receives more snow than most of the eastern U.S. The heavily forested land, short growing season, higher elevation, and logistical factors (e.g. long distance to market, lack of infrastructure, etc.) make the Upper Peninsula poorly suited for agriculture. The region is home to a variety of wildlife, including moose, wolves, coyotes, deer, foxes, bears, mountain lions, bobcats, eagles, hawks, and owls.

== History ==
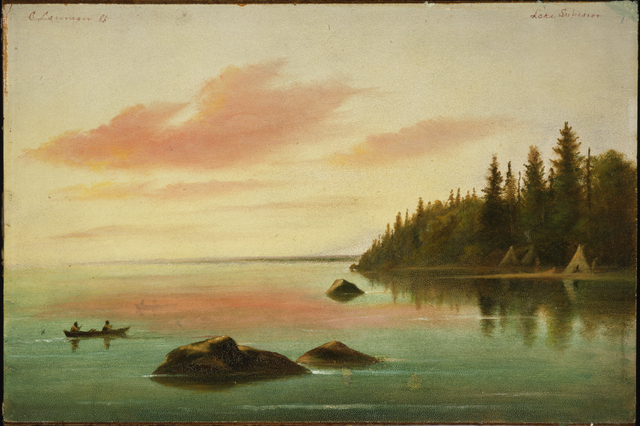
1880s painting of a Native settlement on Lake Superior's southern shore

The first inhabitants of the Upper Peninsula were Paleo-Indians arriving as early as 11,000 BCE, with the population increasing as the climate warmed between 8,500 and 7,000 BCE. The ancestors of modern Anishinaabe Native Americans, speaking a Proto-Algonquian language, arrived as early as 3,000 BCE, ostensibly migrating by foot through modern-day Wisconsin and Ontario and subsequently spreading and diversifying. Established nations at the time of European contact included the Menominee in the west, the Odawa and Potawatomi in the east, the Noquet in the center, and the Ojibwe dispersed throughout. These tribes engaged in relations with one another, erecting migratory footpaths, establishing alliances (including the Council of Three Fires), and trading various goods. They subsisted chiefly from fishing and gathering grains, particularly the abundant wild rice found along the Great Lakes shores and inland marshes.

The mining of minerals, predominantly the peninsula's bountiful reserves of copper, was integral to early tribes, used to construct fish hooks, arrowheads and knives, jewelry, and kitchenware among other items. Remnants of these ancient mines and quarries have been discovered throughout the Keweenaw Peninsula and in the interior of Michigan's Copper Country, alongside evidence of ancient workers trained in metalworking using hammerstones and fire to extricate the pure minerals. The city of Hancock's lucrative Quincy Mine, established in 1846, was itself founded on the hills of a prehistoric copper mine.

=== Arrival of Europeans ===
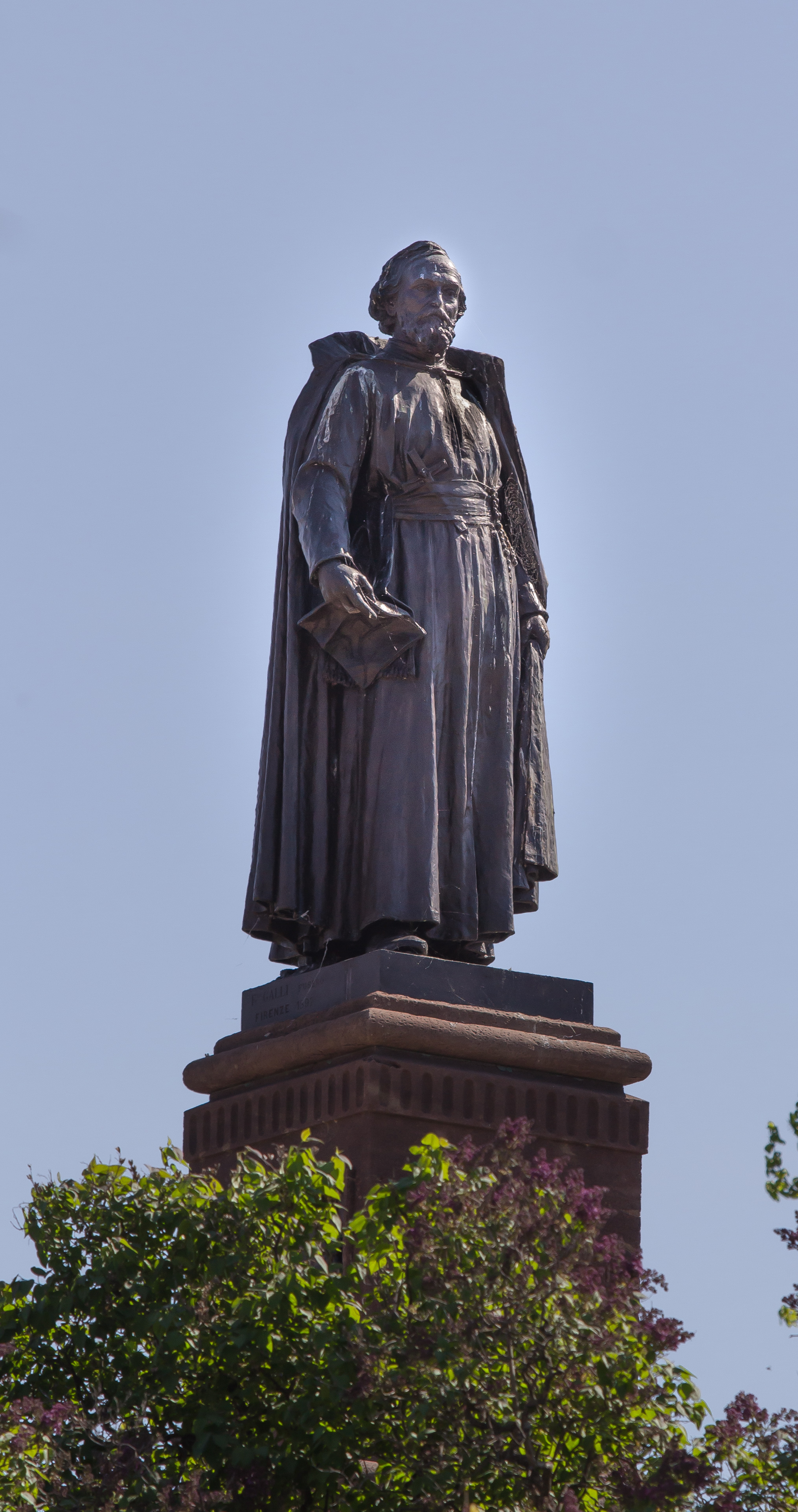
Statue of explorer and missionary Jacques Marquette in Marquette – the founder of Michigan's first two cities, Sault Ste. Marie (1668) and St. Ignace (1671)

Étienne Brûlé, an explorer and Catholic missionary working on behalf of the colony of New France under the tutelage of fellow explorer Samuel de Champlain, was the first known European to visit the peninsula. Accompanied by Wyandot tribesmen, he is recorded to have sailed the St. Marys River around the year 1620 in search of a route to the Far East. French colonists had laid claim to the land in the 17th century, with other European explorers and missionaries, Jacques Marquette among them, mapping the area and engaging with Indians throughout the century and into the 1700s. The government of New France set about establishing missions and fur trading posts such as Sault Ste. Marie and St. Ignace, both of which were locations chosen by Marquette. Sault Ste. Marie, founded in 1668, is the oldest European settlement in Michigan and the site of Native American settlements for centuries, including the contemporary Sault Tribe of Chippewa Indians. By 1680, the major Ojibwe communities on the peninsula were in the Sault, L’Anse, and on Grand Island.

Following the end of the French and Indian War (part of the Seven Years' War) in 1763, the territory was ceded to Great Britain. American Indian tribes who formerly allied with the French were dissatisfied with the British occupation, which brought new territorial policies. Whereas the French cultivated alliances among the Indians, the British postwar approach was to treat the tribes as conquered peoples. In 1763, tribes united in Pontiac's Rebellion to try to drive the British from the area. American Indians captured Fort Michilimackinac, at present-day Mackinaw City, then the principal fort of the British in the Michilimackinac region, as well as others and killed hundreds of British. In 1764, they began negotiations with the British, resulting in temporary peace and changes in objectionable British policies.

=== Under American rule ===
Although the Upper Peninsula nominally became United States territory with the 1783 Treaty of Paris, the British did not give up de facto control until 1797 under terms of the Jay Treaty. As an American territory, the Upper Peninsula was still dominated by the fur trade. John Jacob Astor founded the American Fur Company on Mackinac Island in 1808; however, the industry began to decline in the 1830s as beaver and other game were overhunted.

When the Michigan Territory was first established in 1805, it included only the Lower Peninsula and the eastern portion of the Upper Peninsula. In 1819, the territory was expanded to include the remainder of the Upper Peninsula, all of what later became Wisconsin, and part of Minnesota (previously included in the Indiana and Illinois Territories). Despite the United States gaining political control of the peninsula, the Indian nations still held implicit control over these lands, and were wary of the Americans as former British subjects. Nevertheless, under the threat of further armed conflict and with promises of monetary compensation, the chiefs of these lands ceded their territory through numerous treaties over the next half century, the most significant of which were the 1836 Treaty of Washington and the 1842 Treaty of La Pointe, in which the U.S. gained complete authority of the vast majority of the Upper Peninsula. There exists many Indian reservations in the peninsula established via subsequent treaties, including the Ojibwe-led L'Anse Reservation and Lac Vieux Desert Reservation, and the Potawatomi-led Hannahville Reservation, among others.

When Michigan applied for statehood in the 1830s, the proposal corresponded to the original territorial boundaries. However, there lasted a brief armed conflict known as the "Toledo War" with the state of Ohio over the location of their mutual border, with the Michigan Territory arguing their land claim extended to the namesake Lake Erie port city. Meanwhile, the people of Michigan approved a constitution in May 1835 and elected state officials in late autumn 1835. Although the state government was not yet recognized by the United States Congress, the territorial government effectively ceased to exist. President Andrew Jackson's government offered the remainder of the Upper Peninsula to Michigan if it would cede the Toledo Strip to Ohio. A constitutional convention of the state legislature refused, but a second convention, hastily convened by Governor Stevens Thomson Mason, consisting primarily of his supporters, agreed in December 1836 to the deal. In January 1837, the U.S. Congress admitted Michigan as a state of the Union.

==== Statehood ====
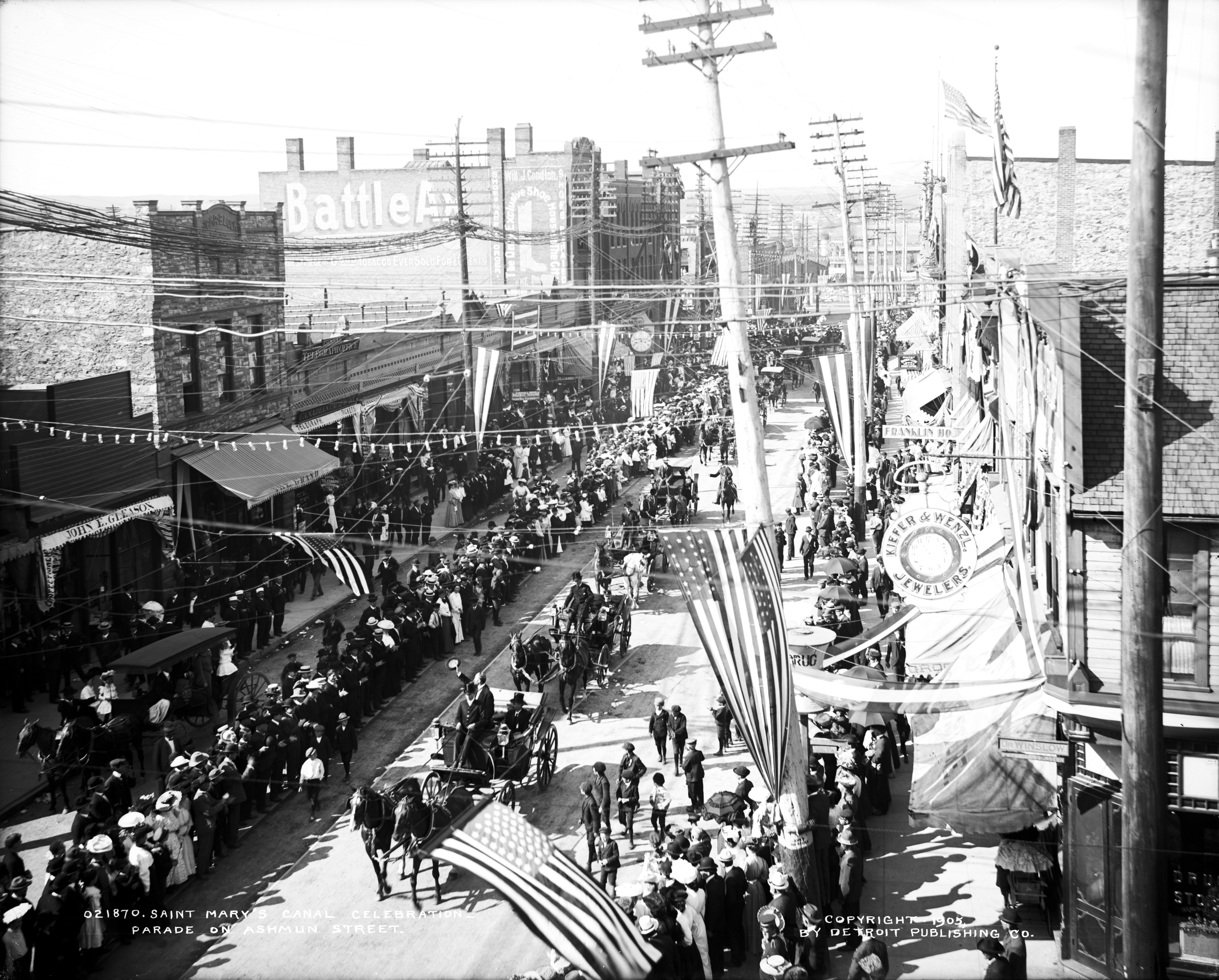
Parade through Ashmun Street in downtown Sault Ste. Marie, c. 1905

At the time of its admission, Michigan was considered the losing party in the Toledo compromise. The land in the Upper Peninsula was described in a federal report as a "sterile region on the shores of Lake Superior destined by soil and climate to remain forever a wilderness." This belief changed when rich mineral deposits (primarily copper and iron) were discovered in the 1840s. The Upper Peninsula's mines produced more mineral wealth than the California Gold Rush, especially after shipping was improved by the opening of the Soo Locks in 1855 and docks in Marquette in 1859. The Upper Peninsula supplied 90% of America's copper by the 1860s. It was the nation's largest supplier of iron ore by the 1890s, and production continued to a peak in the 1920s but sharply declined shortly afterward. The last copper mine closed in 1995, although the majority of mines had closed decades before. Some iron mining continues near Marquette. The Eagle Mine, a nickel-copper mine, opened in 2014.

Thousands of Americans and immigrants moved to the area during the mining boom, prompting the federal government to create Fort Wilkins near Copper Harbor to maintain order. The first wave were the Cornish from Great Britain, with centuries of mining experience; followed by Irish, Germans, and French Canadians. During the 1890s, Finnish immigrants began settling there in large numbers, forming the population plurality in the northwestern portion of the peninsula. In the early 20th century, 75% of the population was foreign-born.

From 1861 to 1865, 90,000 Michigan men fought in the American Civil War, including 1,209 from the Upper Peninsula. Houghton County contributed 460 soldiers, while Marquette County sent 265.

== Geography ==
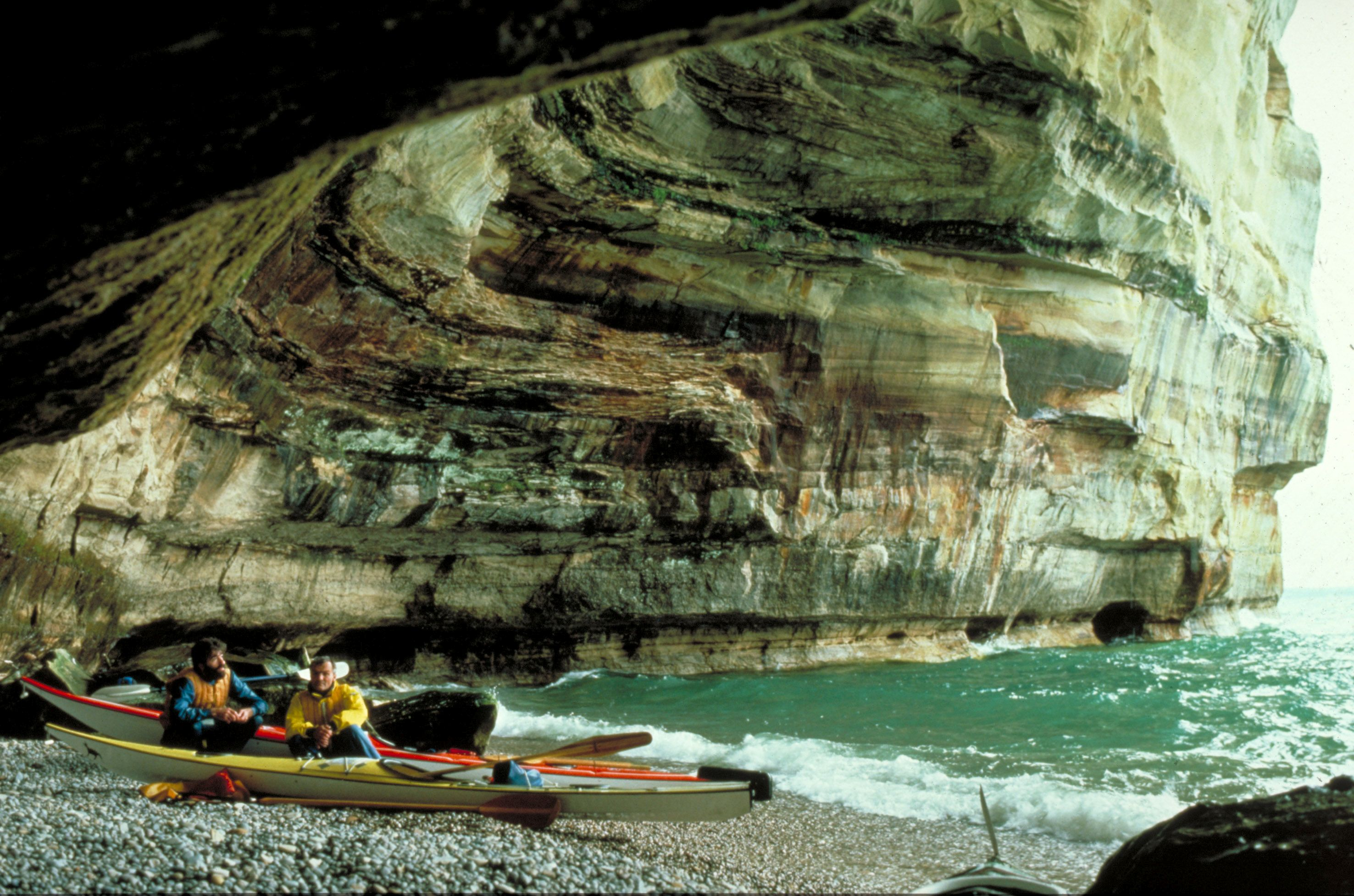
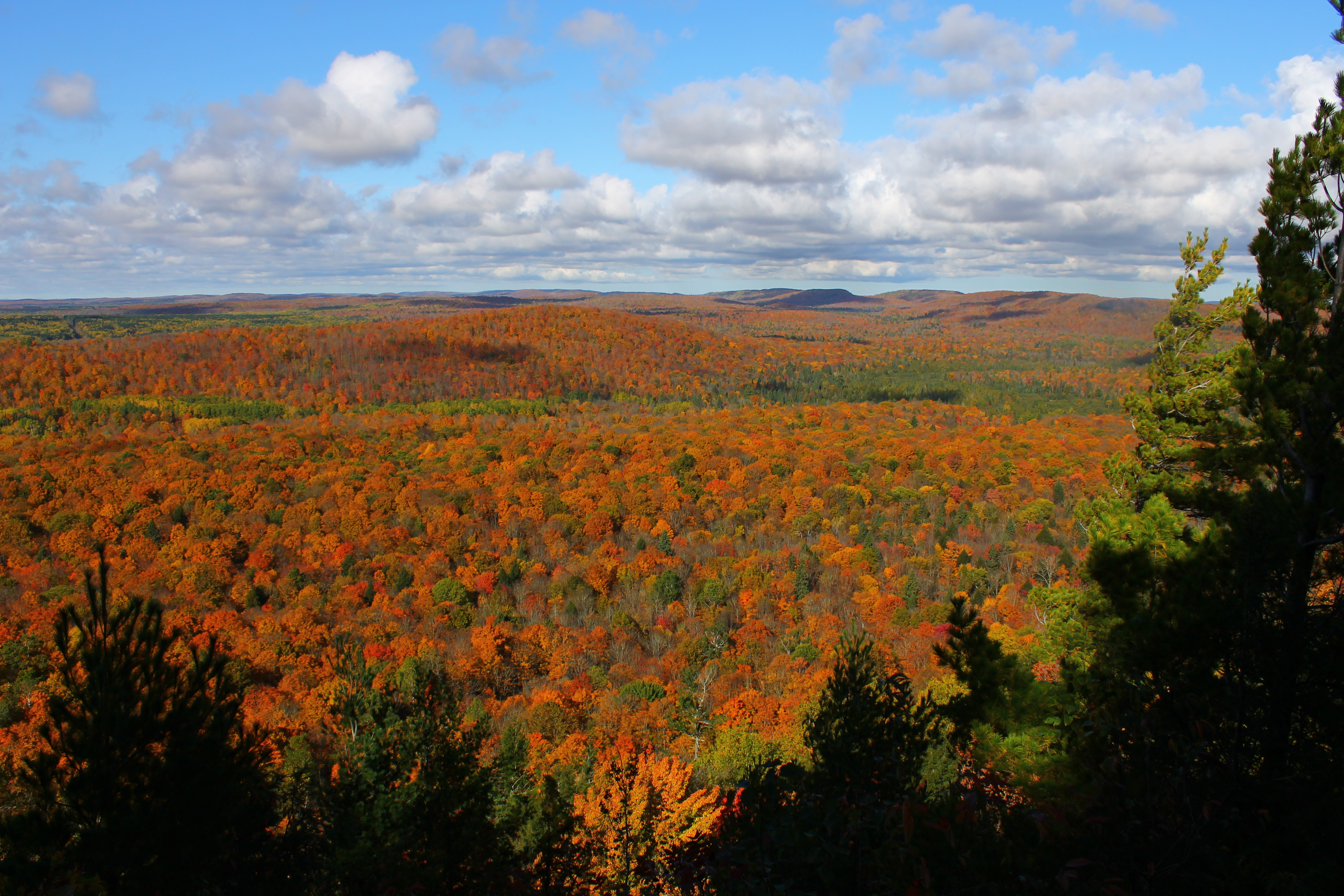
Top: Kayakers beneath a rock cliff in Hiawatha National Forest. Bottom: Overlooking the Porcupine Mountains in Gogebic County during autumn.

Including extensive parts of the Great Lakes, the Upper Peninsula contains about 36,139 square miles (93,600 km^{2}) of total area. Of that, about 16,378 square miles (42,420 km^{2}) is its land area, about 29% of the state. It is bounded on the north by Lake Superior, on the east by St. Marys River, on the south by the Niagara Escarpment, Lake Michigan and Lake Huron, and on the west by Wisconsin and (counting the water border on Lake Superior) by Minnesota. It has about 1,700 miles (2,700 km) of continuous shoreline with the Great Lakes. There are about 4,300 inland lakes, the largest of which is Lake Gogebic, and 12,000 miles (19,000 km) of streams. Its lowest elevation is along the shoreline of Lake Huron and Lake Michigan, averaging 577 feet (176 m) above sea level. Its highest elevation is Mount Arvon at 1,979 feet (603 m), which also makes it the tallest natural point in the East North Central states.

Michigan's Upper Peninsula is bounded on land by Wisconsin to the southwest and west and in territorial waters by Minnesota to the west, Ontario to the west, north and east, and the Door Peninsula of Wisconsin extends into Lake Michigan east of the western Upper Peninsula. As a consequence of being surrounded by water on three sides, there exist many sub-peninsulas in the region, most prominently the Keweenaw Peninsula and Abbaye Peninsula in Lake Superior and the Stonington Peninsula and Garden Peninsula in Lake Michigan.

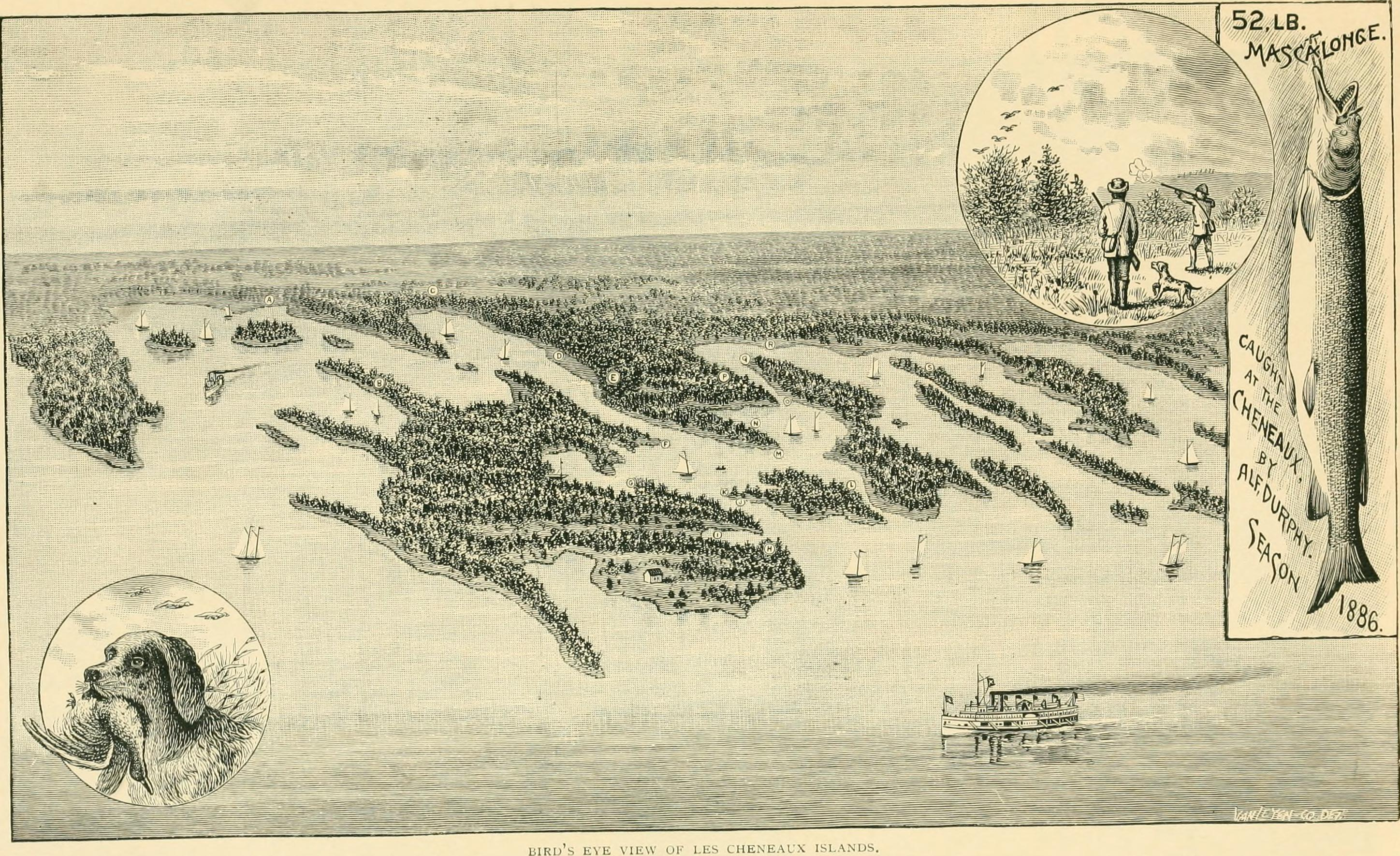
1890 map of the glacially shaped Les Cheneaux Islands, between the mainland and Lake Huron

Five Michigan Upper Peninsula counties include nearby major islands: Mackinac Island, Round Island and Bois Blanc Island in Lake Huron are part of Mackinac County; Sugar Island and Neebish Island in the St. Marys River, and Drummond Island in Lake Huron are in Chippewa County; Grand Island is in Alger County; Summer Island is in Delta County; and Isle Royale is part of Keweenaw County. The peninsula is divided between the flat, swampy areas in the east, part of the Great Lakes Plain, and the steeper, more rugged western half, called the Superior Upland, part of the Canadian Shield. The rock in the western portion is the result of volcanic eruptions and is estimated to be at least 3.5 billion years old (much older than the eastern portion) and contains the region's ore resources. Banded-iron formations were deposited 2 billion years ago; this is the Marquette Range Supergroup. A considerable amount of bedrock is visible. Mount Arvon is within the Huron Mountains, located in Marquette and Baraga counties. The Porcupine Mountains are located in the extreme northwest of the peninsula. All of the higher areas are the remnants of ancient peaks, worn down over millions of years by erosion and glaciers.

The Keweenaw Peninsula is the northernmost part of the peninsula (excluding Isle Royale, which is politically part of the UP). It projects into Lake Superior and was the site of the first copper boom in the United States, part of a larger region of the peninsula called the Copper Country. Copper Island is its northernmost section. About one-third of the peninsula is government-owned recreational forest land today, including the Ottawa National Forest and Hiawatha National Forest. Although heavily logged in the 19th century, the majority of the land was forested with mature trees by the 1970s.

There was a boundary dispute over the border with Wisconsin. The northwesternmost portion of the border follows a line from Lac Vieux Desert to the headwaters of the Montreal River. An 1847 survey established the east branch of the Montreal River as the border. However, the 1908 revision of the Constitution of Michigan specified that the west branch of the Montreal River was the proper border, which would have placed an additional 360 square miles of land on the Michigan side of the border. A 1926 Supreme Court decision awarded this tract of land to Wisconsin.

=== Wildlife ===
The Upper Peninsula contains a large variety of wildlife. Some of the mammals found in the UP include shrews, moles, mice, white-tailed deer, moose, black bears, cougar, gray and red foxes, wolves, river otters, martens, fishers, muskrats, bobcats, coyotes, snowshoe hares, cotton-tail rabbits, porcupines, chipmunks, squirrels, raccoons, opossum and bats. There is a large variety of birds, including hawks, osprey, owls, gulls, hummingbirds, chickadees, robins (the state bird), woodpeckers, warblers, and bald eagles. In terms of reptiles and amphibians, the UP has common garter snakes, red bellied snakes, pine snakes, northern water snakes, brown snakes, eastern garter snakes, eastern fox snakes, eastern ribbon back snakes, green snakes, northern ringneck snakes, eastern milk snakes (Mackinac and Marquette counties) and eastern hognose snakes (Menominee County only), plus snapping turtles, wood turtles, and painted turtles (the state reptile), green frogs, bullfrogs, northern leopard frogs, and salamanders. Lakes and rivers contain many fish such as walleye, muskie, northern pike, trout, salmon, bullhead catfish, and bass. Invasive species like the alewife and sea lamprey can be found in the Great Lakes. The UP also contains many shellfish, such as clams, aquatic snails, and crayfish. The American Bird Conservancy and the National Audubon Society have designated several locations as internationally Important Bird Areas.

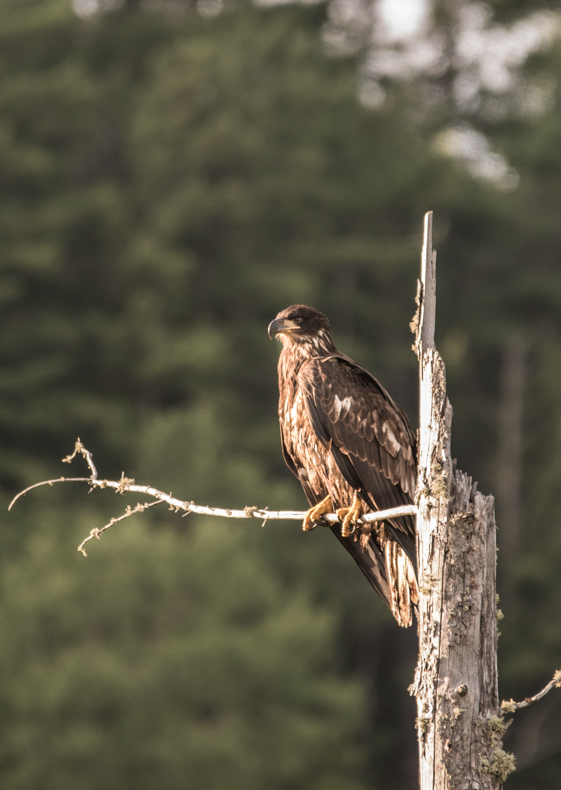
Juvenile bald eagle in the Keweenaw Peninsula

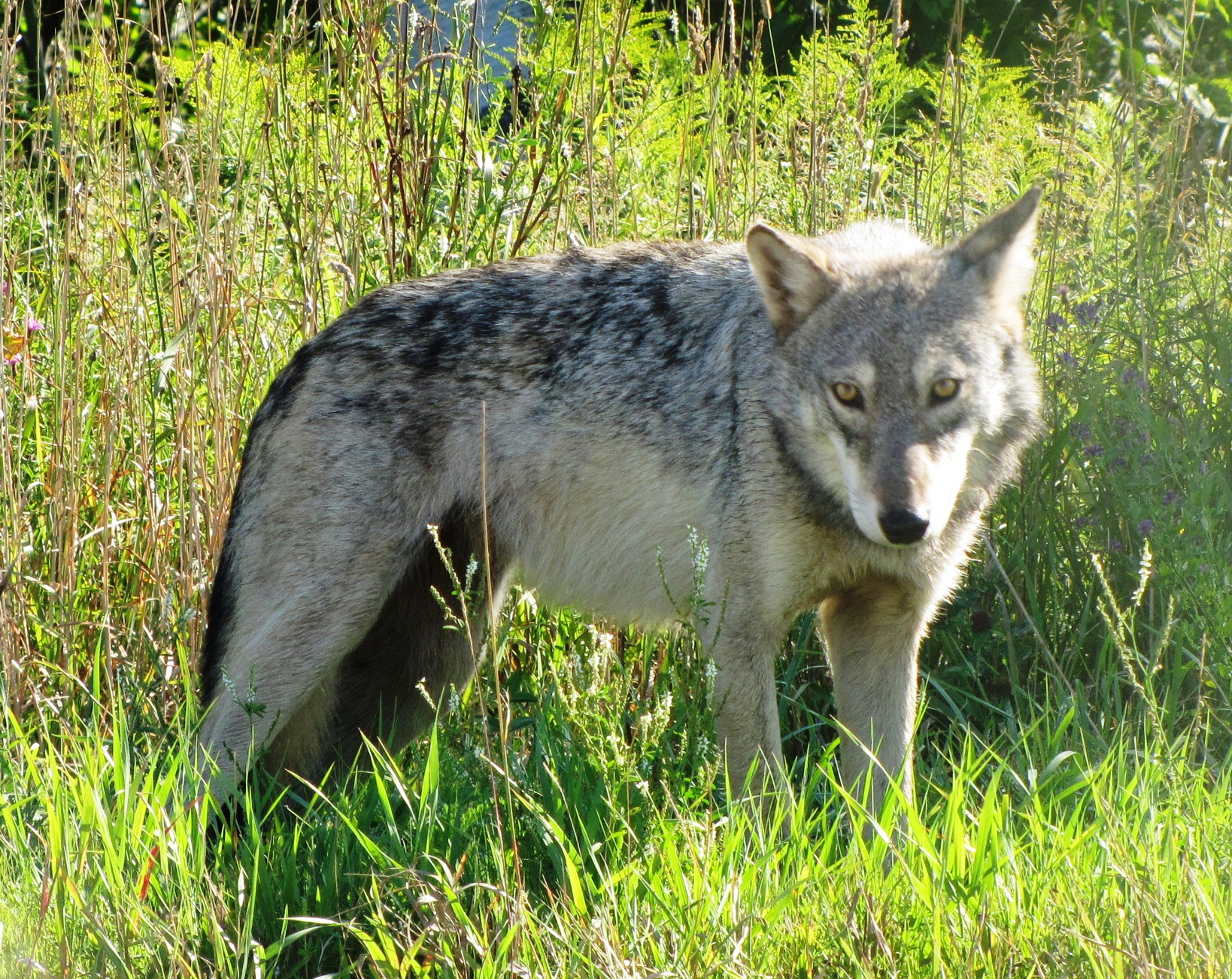
Female gray wolf in the Seney National Wildlife Refuge

After being nearly extirpated from the conterminous United States, gray wolves survived in the remote northeastern corner of Minnesota and Ontario. The repopulation of wolves in this region has occurred naturally as they have expanded their territory after they were protected under the federal Endangered Species Act in 1978. Michigan Department of Natural Resources's principal goals set in 2008 included maintaining a viable wolf population, facilitating wolf-related benefits, minimizing wolf-related conflicts and conducting "science-based and socially acceptable management of wolves". Michigan removed wolves from the state's list of threatened and endangered species in 2009, having reached the recovery goal of 200 for five consecutive years in 2004. In 2012, FWS issued a rule that classified and delisted a sub-species called the Western Great Lakes wolves under the federal Endangered Species Act. Michigan had a legal wolf hunt in 2013. Wolves were returned to the list of federally threatened species in December 2014 as a result of a court ruling. The Department of Natural Resources found that an equilibrium has been achieved between the available habitat and the number of predators the region can support. The department supports delisting, as wolves have met and exceeded the biological recovery goals that would necessitate protection.

There is significant discussion and studies over the presence of eastern cougars in the UP. Historically, the last of the species, or subspecies, was extirpated near Newberry in 1906, although there have been sightings of the creatures over the years since. These reports increased in number over the first decade of the 21st century. The Michigan Department of Natural Resources and Environment (DNRE) (Note: The DNRE was split back into the Michigan Department of Natural Resources (DNR) and the Michigan Department of Environmental Quality (DEQ) on January 4, 2011.) formed a four-person team to investigate sightings in the state. The biologists with the DNRE currently do not believe that there is a breeding population anywhere in the state, rather that the sighted animals are visitors to the state. As late as January 2007, the DNRE's official position was that no cougars lived in Michigan. Several residents in the state disagree with both current and previous positions on the part of the DNRE. Researchers at Central Michigan University and the Michigan Wildlife Conservancy in 2006 published the findings of a study using DNA analysis of fecal samples taken in the Upper and Lower peninsulas that showed the presence of cougars at the time. These results were disputed in a second journal article in 2007 by other researchers from Eastern Michigan University and the U.S. Forest Service. A citizen's group, the Michigan Citizens for Cougar Recognition (MCCR), independently tracked sightings and in 2009 listed Delta County as the location with the greatest number of reports in the state. The DNRE verified five sets of tracks and two trail camera photos in Delta, Chippewa, Marquette, and Menominee counties since 2008. DNRE officials acknowledge that there are cougars in the UP, but not elsewhere in the state. Critics of the DNRE's position on the species, including the founder of the MCCR, say that the department is attempting to "avoid paying for a cougar management program". In March 2025 the DNR released a statement that two cougar cubs were verified to be living in an undisclosed area of Ontonagon County, the first time cougar cubs have been verified in the Western Great Lakes in over 100 years. The presence of the cubs, estimated via photographic evidence to be around seven weeks old, is in contrast to previous sightings which are thought to be transient adult animals and not representative of resident or breeding populations.

There are also many invasive species that are primarily brought in the ballast water of foreign ships, usually from the ocean bordering northeastern Asia. This water is dumped directly into the Great Lakes, depositing a variety of fresh and salt water fish and invertebrates, most notably the zebra mussel, Dreissena polymorpha. There are also many plant species that have been transported to the Great Lakes, including purple loosestrife, Lythrum salicaria and Phragmites australis, both of which are considered to be a threat to native hydrophyte wetland plants. The emerald ash borer was first reported in the UP at Brimley State Park and is considered to be a serious ecological threat to the habitat and economy.

=== Climate ===
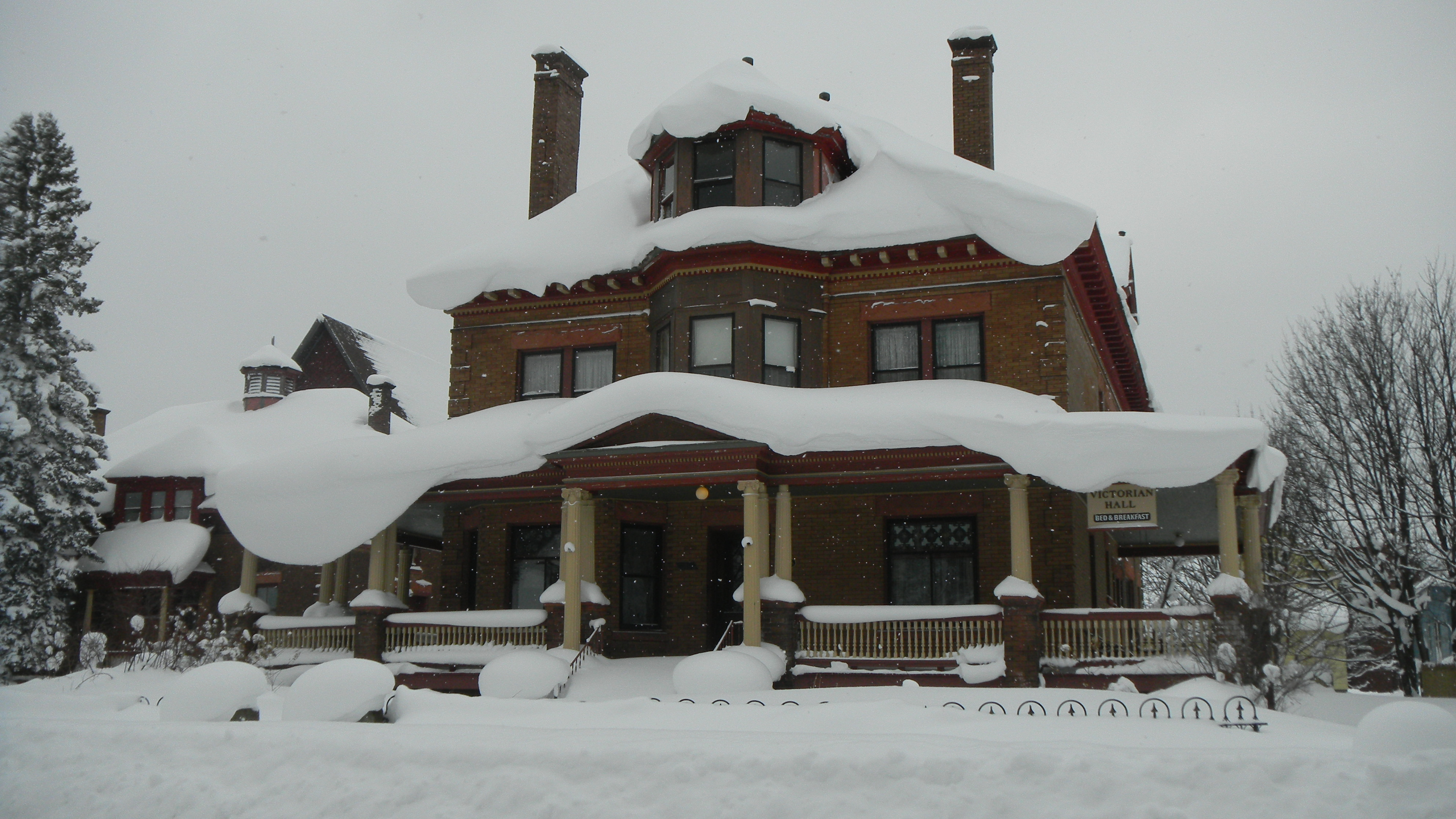
An inn in Laurium after a typical winter snowfall

The Upper Peninsula has a humid continental climate (Dfb in the Köppen climate classification system). The Great Lakes have a great effect on the larger part of the peninsula. Winters tend to be long, cold, and snowy for most of the peninsula, and because of its northern latitude, the daylight hours are short—around 8 hours between sunrise and sunset in the winter. Lake Superior has the greatest effect on the area, especially the northern and western parts. Lake-effect snow causes many areas to get in excess of 100–250 inches (2.5–6.4 m) of snow per year—especially in the Keweenaw Peninsula and Gogebic County, and to a lesser extent Baraga, Marquette and Alger counties, making the western UP a prominent part of the midwestern snowbelt.

Records of 390 inches (9.9 m) of snow or more have been set in many communities in this area. The Keweenaw Peninsula averages more snowfall than any other location east of the Mississippi River. Because of the howling storms across Lake Superior, which cause dramatic amounts of precipitation, it has been said that the lake-effect snow makes the Keweenaw Peninsula the snowiest place east of the Rockies. Herman averages 236 inches (5.99 m) of snow every year. Lake-effect snow can cause blinding whiteouts in just minutes, and some storms can last for days. Hancock is found frequently on lists of the snowiest cities in America.

The banana belt along the Wisconsin border has a more continental climate since most of its weather does not arrive from the lakes. Summers tend to be warmer and winter nights much colder. Coastal communities have temperatures tempered by the Great Lakes. In summer, it might be 10 °F (5.6 °C) cooler at lakeside than it is inland, and the opposite effect is seen in winter. The area of the Upper Peninsula north of Green Bay through Menominee and Escanaba (and extending west to Iron River) does not have the extreme weather and precipitation found to the north. The coldest temperature officially recorded in the Upper Peninsula was −48 °F (−44 °C) in Humboldt in January 1915.

=== Time zones ===
Like the entire Lower Peninsula, most of the Upper Peninsula is within the Eastern Time Zone. However, the four counties bordering Wisconsin are in the Central Time Zone. In 1967, when the Uniform Time Act came into effect, the Upper Peninsula went under year-round Central Standard Time, with no daylight saving time. In 1973, the majority of the peninsula switched to Eastern Standard Time; only the four western border counties of Gogebic, Iron, Dickinson, and Menominee continue to observe Central Standard Time. Daylight saving time is observed peninsula-wide.

== Demographics ==
The Upper Peninsula remains a predominantly rural region. As of the 2020 census, the region had a population of 301,608, just more than 3% of Michigan's total population and a decline of 3.2% from 2010.

According to the 2010 census, 103,211 people live in the 12 towns of at least 4,000 people, covering 96.5 square miles (250 km^{2}). A total of 116,548 people live in the 18 towns and villages of at least 2,000 people, which cover 108.5 square miles (281 km^{2})—less than 1% of the peninsula's land area.

Cities and villages of the Upper Peninsula
City	Population	Area (sq mi)	Area (km^{2})
Marquette	20,629	11.4	30
Sault Ste. Marie	13,337	14.8	38
Escanaba	12,450	12.7	33
Menominee	8,488	5.2	13
Houghton	8,386	4.3	11
Iron Mountain	7,518	7.2	19
Ishpeming	6,140	8.7	23
Gladstone	5,257	5.0	13
Kingsford	5,139	4.3	11
Ironwood	5,045	6.6	17
Negaunee	4,627	13.8	36
Hancock	4,501	2.5	6.5
Iron River	3,007	3.5	9.1
Norway	2,840	8.8	23
Manistique	2,828	3.2	8.3
St. Ignace	2,306	2.7	7.0
Munising	1,986	5.4	14
Baraga	1,883	2.2	5.7
L'Anse	1,874	2.6	6.7
Laurium	1,864	0.65	1.7
Bessemer	1,805	5.5	14
Wakefield	1,702	8.4	22
Crystal Falls	1,598	3.64	9.4
Newberry	1,446	0.98	2.5
Ontonagon	1,285	3.84	9.9
Lake Linden	1,014	0.9	2.3
Stephenson	816	1.08	2.8
Caspian	805	1.43	3.7
South Range	750	0.36	0.93
Calumet	621	0.2	0.52
Mackinac Island	583	18.84	48.8
Powers	381	0.99	2.6
Gaastra	316	1.64	4.2
Daggett	201	1.12	2.9
Copper City	187	0.08	0.21
Carney	179	1.37	3.5
Ahmeek	127	0.06	0.16
Alpha	126	0.99	2.6
Total	134,428	96.5	250

Upper Peninsula land area and population density by county (2010)
County	Population	Land area		Population density	
County	Population	sq mi	km^{2}	per sq mi	per km^{2}
Alger	8,842	915	2,370	10.5	4.1
Baraga	8,158	898	2,330	9.8	3.8
Chippewa	36,785	1,558	4,040	24.7	9.5
Delta	36,903	1,171	3,030	31.6	12.2
Dickinson	25,947	761	1,970	34.4	13.3
Gogebic	14,380	1,101	2,850	14.9	5.8
Houghton	37,361	1,009	2,610	36.3	14.0
Iron	11,631	1,166	3,020	10.1	3.9
Keweenaw	2,046	540	1,400	4.0	1.5
Luce	5,339	899	2,330	7.3	2.8
Mackinac	10,834	1,021	2,640	10.8	4.2
Marquette	66,017	1,808	4,680	37.1	14.3
Menominee	23,502	1,044	2,700	23.0	8.9
Ontonagon	5,816	1,311	3,400	5.1	2.0
Schoolcraft	8,047	1,171	3,030	7.2	2.8
Total	301,608	16,377	42,420	19.0	7.3

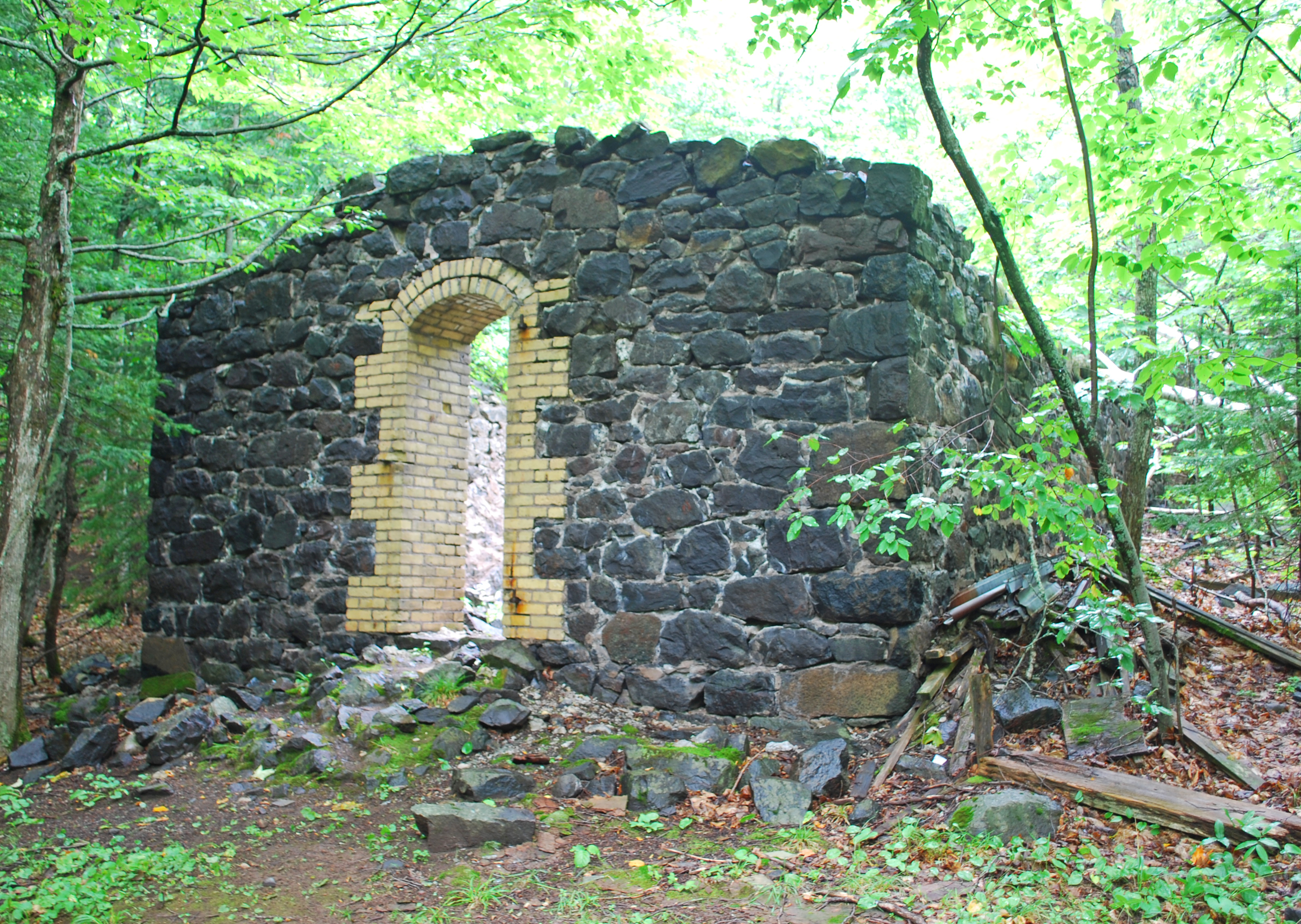
Ruins of the Central Mine Historic District powderhouse

Federal censuses indicate that the population of the Upper Peninsula grew throughout the 19th century as European settlers moved into the region, then boomed around the turn of the century, and experienced gradual decline overall during most of the 20th century. The decline was uneven, however: the population in the largest cities – Marquette, Sault Ste Marie, and Escanaba – grew somewhat, while smaller cities and non-urban areas have generally declined in population. The six westernmost counties experienced the largest decrease, from a 1920 population of 153,674 to a 2020 population of 79,392. Many ghost towns exist in the region.

A "▲" indicates an increase in population from the previous census, and a "▼" indicates a decrease in population from the previous census.

Population by census year of the Upper Peninsula by county
County	1830	1840	1850	1860	1870	1880	1890	1900	1910	1920	1930	1940	1950	1960	1970	1980	1990	2000	2010	2020
Alger	—	—	—	—	—	—	1,238▲	5,868▲	7,675▲	9,983▲	9,327▼	10,167▲	10,007▼	9,250▼	8,568▼	9,225▲	8,972▼	9,862▲	9,601▼	8,842▼
Baraga	—	—	—	—	—	1,804▲	3,036▲	4,320▲	6,125▲	7,662▲	9,168▲	9,356▲	8,037▼	7,151▼	7,789▲	8,484▲	7,954▼	8,735▲	8,860▲	8,158▼
Chippewa	626▲	534▼	898▲	1,603▲	1,689▲	5,248▲	12,018▲	21,338▲	24,472▲	24,818▲	25,047▲	27,807▲	29,206▲	32,655▲	32,412▼	29,029▼	34,604▲	38,543▲	38,520▼	36,785▼
Delta	—	—	—	1,172▲	2,542▲	6,812▲	15,330▲	23,881▲	30,108▲	30,909▲	32,280▲	34,037▲	32,913▼	34,298▲	35,924▲	38,947▲	37,780▼	38,520▲	37,069▼	36,903▼
Dickinson	—	—	—	—	—	—	—	17,890▲	20,524▲	19,456▼	29,941▲	28,731▼	24,844▼	23,917▼	23,753▼	25,341▲	26,831▲	27,427▲	26,168▼	25,947▼
Gogebic	—	—	—	—	—	—	13,166▲	16,738▲	23,333▲	33,225▲	31,577▼	31,797▲	27,053▼	24,370▼	20,676▼	19,686▼	18,052▼	17,370▼	16,427▼	14,380▼
Houghton	—	—	708▲	9,234▲	13,879▲	22,473▲	35,389▲	66,063▲	88,098▲	71,930▼	52,851▼	47,631▼	39,771▼	34,654▼	34,652▼	37,872▲	35,446▼	36,016▲	36,628▲	37,361▲
Iron	—	—	—	—	—	—	4,432▲	8,990▲	15,164▲	22,107▲	20,805▼	20,243▼	17,692▼	17,184▼	13,813▼	13,635▼	13,175▼	13,138▼	11,817▼	11,631▼
Keweenaw	—	—	—	—	4,205▲	4,270▲	2,894▼	3,217▲	7,156▲	6,322▼	5,076▼	4,004▼	2,918▼	2,417▼	2,264▼	1,963▼	1,701▼	2,301▲	2,156▼	2,046▼
Luce	—	—	—	—	—	—	2,455▲	2,983▲	4,004▲	6,149▲	6,528▲	7,423▲	8,147▲	7,827▼	6,789▼	6,659▼	5,763▼	7,024▲	6,631▼	5,339▼
Mackinac	877▲	923▲	3,598▲	1,938▼	1,716▼	2,902▲	7,830▲	7,703▼	9,249▲	8,026▼	8,783▲	9,438▲	9,287▼	10,853▲	9,660▼	10,178▲	10,674▲	11,943▲	11,113▼	10,834▼
Marquette	—	—	136▲	2,821▲	15,033▲	25,394▲	39,521▲	41,239▲	46,739▲	45,786▼	44,076▼	47,144▲	47,654▲	56,154▲	64,686▲	74,101▲	70,887▼	64,634▼	67,077▲	66,017▼
Menominee	—	—	—	—	1,791▲	11,987▲	33,639▲	27,046▼	25,648▼	23,778▼	23,652▼	24,883▲	25,299▲	24,685▼	24,587▼	26,201▲	24,920▼	25,109▲	24,029▼	23,502▼
Ontonagon	—	—	389▲	4,568▲	2,845▼	2,565▼	3,756▲	6,197▲	8,650▲	12,428▲	11,114▼	11,359▲	10,282▼	10,584▲	10,548▼	9,861▼	8,854▼	7,818▼	6,780▼	5,816▼
Schoolcraft	—	—	16▲	78▲	—	1,575▲	5,818▲	7,889▲	8,681▲	9,977▲	8,451▼	9,524▲	9,148▼	8,953▼	8,226▼	8,575▲	8,302▼	8,903▲	8,485▼	8,047▼
Total	1,503▲	1,457▼	5,745▲	21,414▲	43,700▲	85,030▲	180,522▲	261,362▲	325,626▲	332,556▲	318,676▼	323,544▲	302,258▼	304,952▲	304,347▼	319,757▲	313,915▼	317,213▲	311,361▼	301,608▼

== Education ==
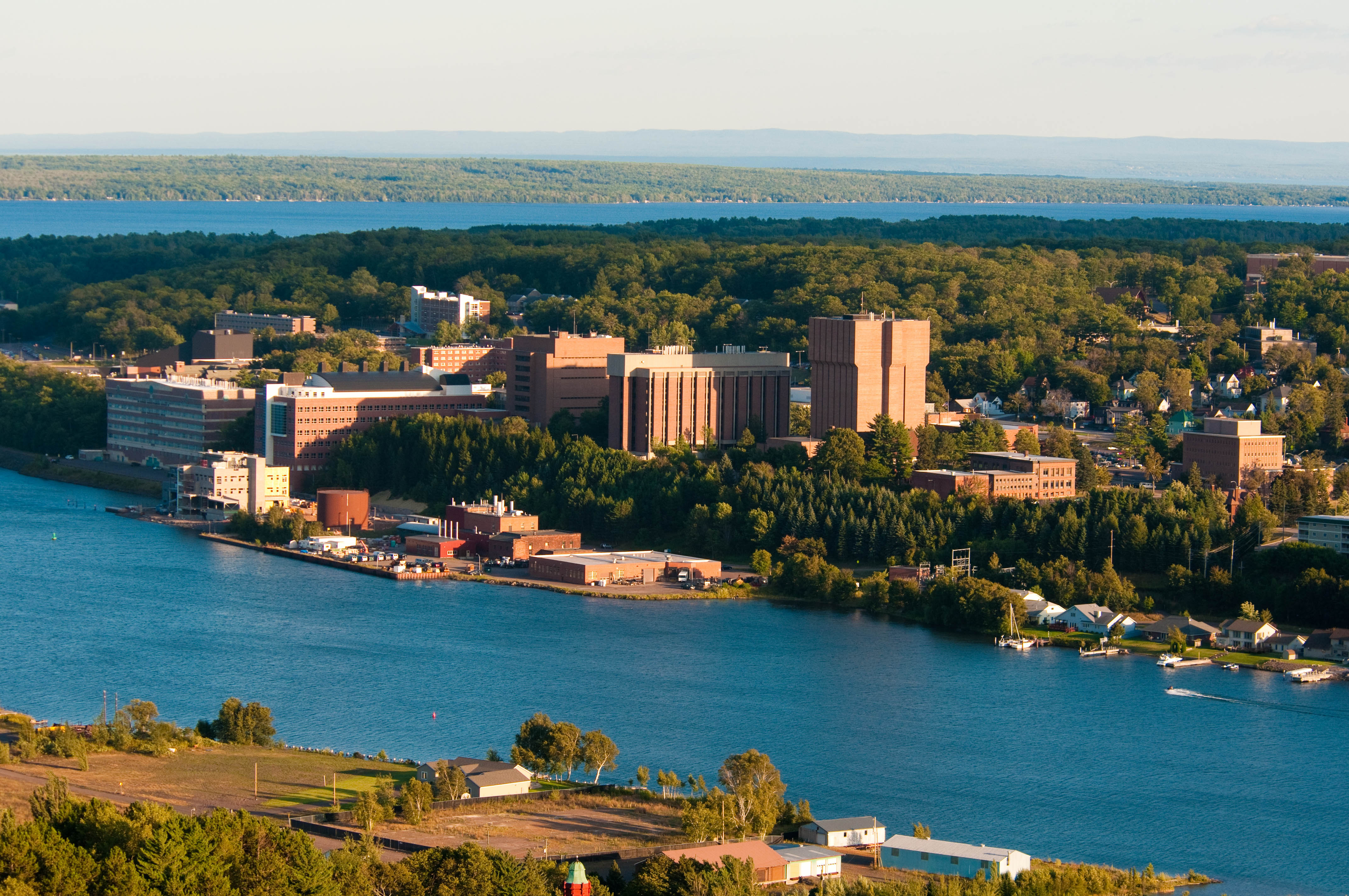
Campus of Michigan Technological University in Houghton, founded as the Michigan Mining School in 1885

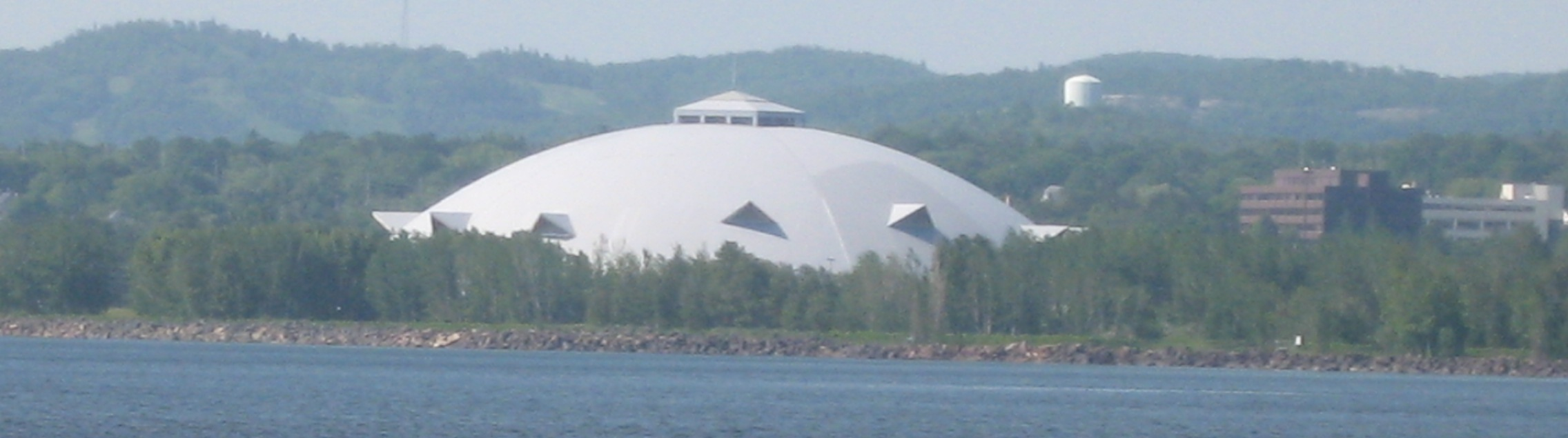
The Superior Dome at Northern Michigan University, the largest wooden dome in the world and home to the NMU athletic department

The Upper Peninsula of Michigan has three state universities (Lake Superior State University in Sault Ste. Marie, Michigan Technological University in Houghton, and Northern Michigan University in Marquette) and five community colleges (Bay Mills Community College in Brimley, Bay de Noc Community College in Escanaba and Iron Mountain, Gogebic Community College in Ironwood, and Keweenaw Bay Ojibwa Community College in Baraga).

== Culture ==
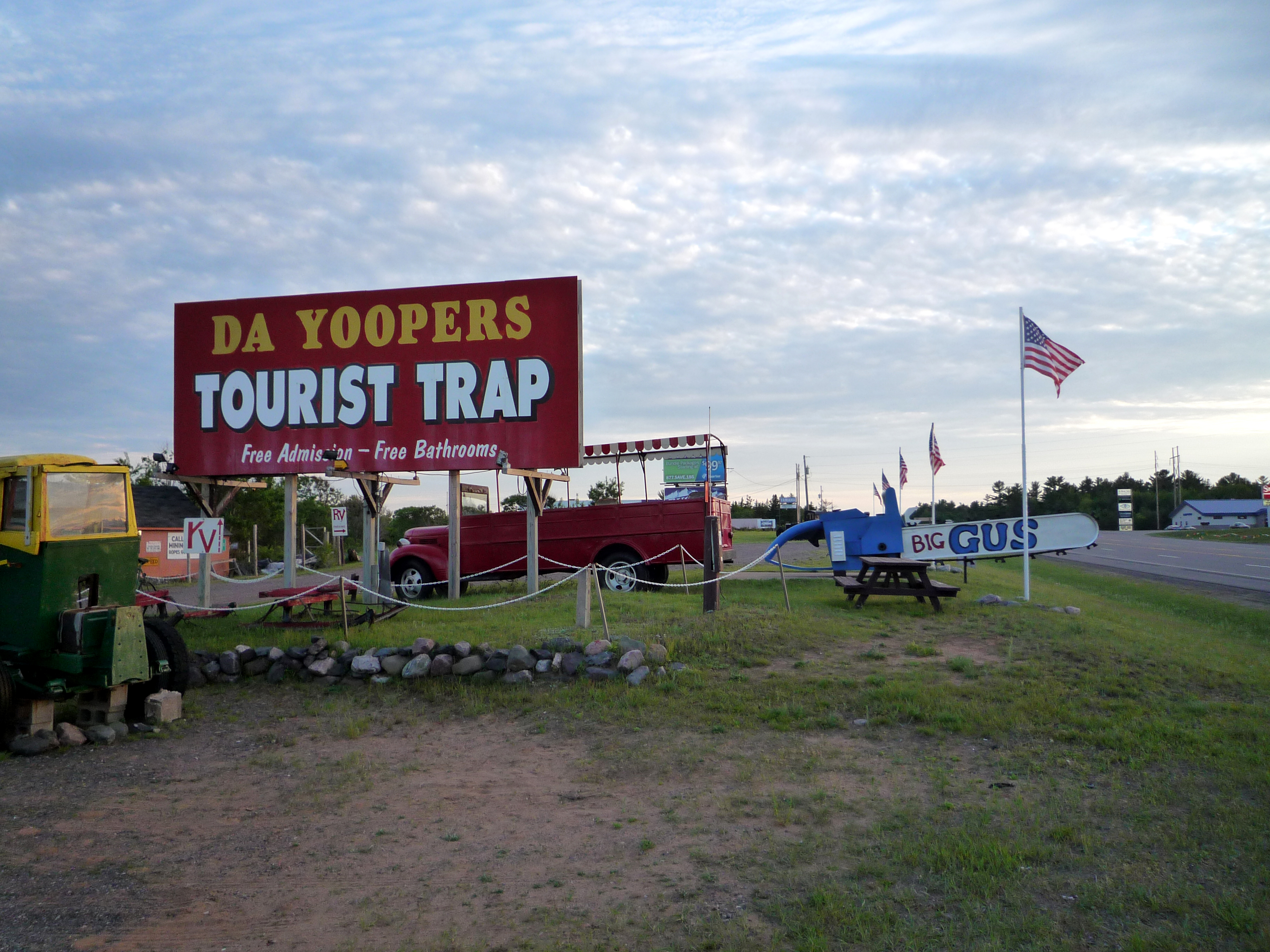
"Da Yoopers Tourist Trap", near Ishpeming, which features a host of items in its museum and store that play up Yooper stereotypes

Early settlers included multiple waves of people from Nordic countries, and people of Finnish ancestry make up 16% of the peninsula's population. The Finnish sauna and the concept of sisu have been adopted widely by residents of the Upper Peninsula. The television program Finland Calling was for a long period the only Finnish-language television broadcast in the United States; it aired on Marquette station WLUC-TV from March 25, 1962, until March 29, 2015. Finlandia University, America's only college with Finnish roots, was located in Hancock, but has shut down as of spring 2023. Street signs in Hancock appear in English and Finnish to celebrate this heritage.

Other sizable ethnic communities in the Upper Peninsula include French-Canadian, German, Cornish, Italian, and Ojibwe ancestry.

People from the Upper Peninsula speak a dialect influenced by Scandinavian and French-Canadian speech. A popular bumper sticker, a parody of the "Say YES to Michigan" slogan promoted by state tourism officials, shows an outline of the Upper Peninsula and the slogan, "Say ya to da UP, eh!" The dialect and culture are captured in many songs by Da Yoopers, a comedy music and skit troupe from Ishpeming.

The Keweenaw Peninsula is home to several ski areas. Mont Ripley, just outside Houghton, is popular among students of Michigan Technological University (the university actually owns the ski hill). Further up the peninsula in the small town of Lac La Belle is Mt. Bohemia. A skiing purist's resort, Bohemia is a self-proclaimed "experts only" mountain, and it does not groom its heavily gladed slopes. Other ski areas are Pine Mountain located in Iron Mountain, Norway Mountain in the town of the same name, and the Porcupine Mountains Ski Area located in Ontonagon.

Houghton is where professional ice hockey was first started in 1904.

=== Regional identity ===
When the Mackinac Bridge first opened, many feared the U.P. would cease to maintain its singular identity and start to blend in culturally with the lower peninsula. But it has, in fact, been the opposite. If anything, the Yooper identity has strengthened since that time. There's even more of a sense of identity of place, culture and way of life.

— Dan Truckey, U.P. Heritage Center, Northern Michigan University, 2025

As of 2018, the western Upper Peninsula is home to about 173,887 people, while the eastern Upper Peninsula is home to about 133,499 people, a total of 307,386—only about 3% of the state's population—living in almost one-third of the state's land area. Upper Peninsula residents are known as Yoopers (from "UP-ers"), and many consider themselves Yoopers before they consider themselves Michiganders. (People living in the Lower Peninsula are commonly called "trolls" by Upper Peninsula residents, as they live "Under the Bridge".) This regionalism is not only a result of the physical separation of the two peninsulas, but also the history of the state.

Residents of the western Upper Peninsula take on some of the cultural identities of both Wisconsin and Michigan. In terms of sports fandom, residents may support Detroit professional teams or those of Wisconsin, particularly the Green Bay Packers. This is a result of both proximity and the broadcast and print media of the area. The four counties that border Wisconsin are also in the Central Time Zone, unlike the rest of Michigan, which is on Eastern time. In some cases, commercial cartographers draw incorrect maps that inadvertently annex the Upper Peninsula into Wisconsin. Other maps of Michigan or the United States sometimes omit the Upper Peninsula, as does The Mitten, how residents of the Lower Peninsula use a hand to depict where in the state they are from.

=== Cuisine ===
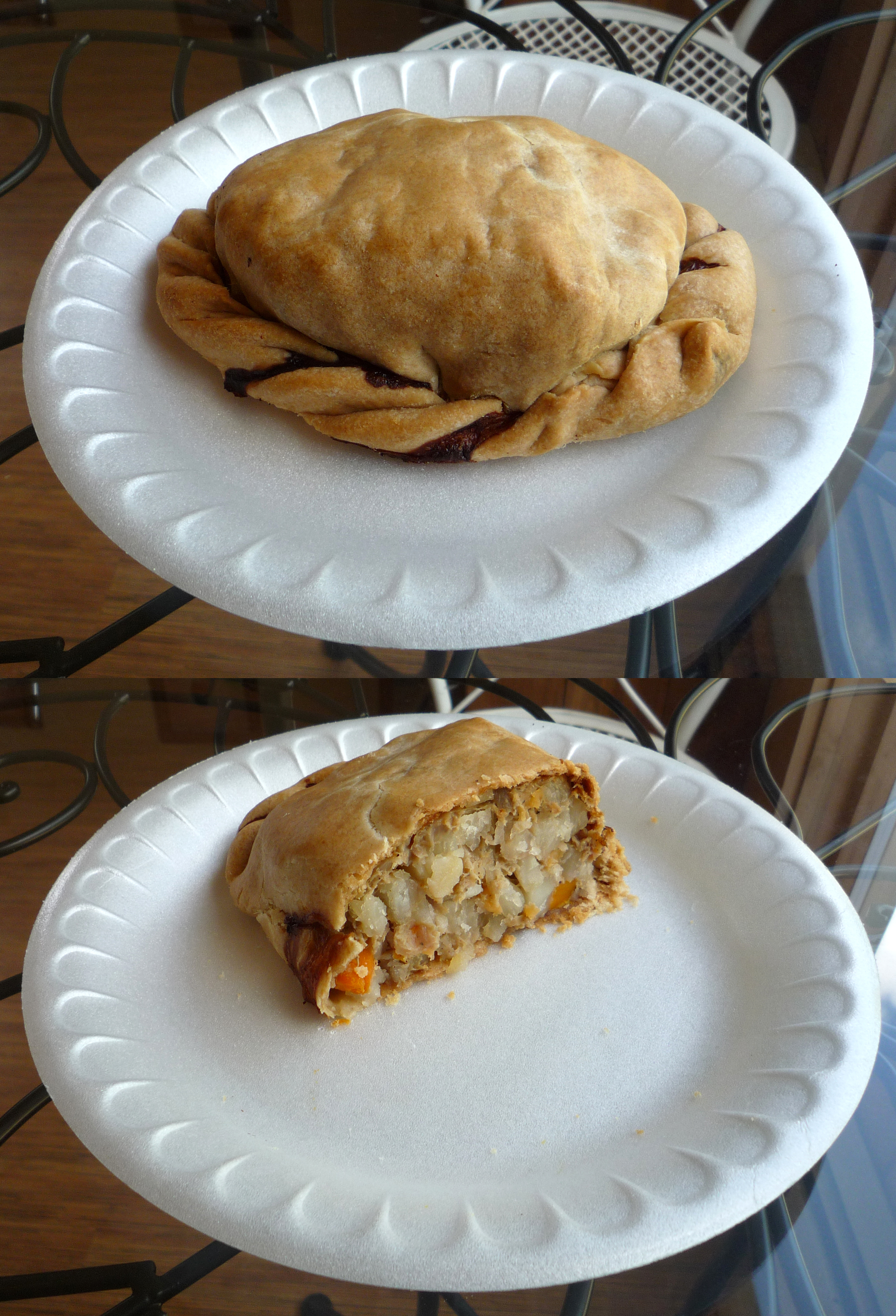
A Yooper pasty (beef)

The Upper Peninsula has a distinctive local cuisine. The pasty (pronounced "pass-tee"), a kind of meat turnover originally brought to the region by Cornish miners, is popular among locals and tourists alike. Pasty varieties include chicken, venison, pork, hamburger, and pizza, all of which many restaurants serve. Many restaurants serve potato sausage and cudighi, a spicy Italian meat.

Finnish immigrants contributed nisu, a cardamom-flavored sweet bread; limppu, an Eastern Finnish rye bread; pannukakku, a variant on the pancake with a custard flavor; viili (sometimes spelled "fellia"), a stretchy, fermented Finnish milk; and korppu, hard slices of toasted cinnamon bread, traditionally dipped in coffee. Some Finnish foods such as juusto (squeaky cheese, essentially a cheese curd, like Leipäjuusto) and saunamakkara (a ring-bologna sausage) have become so ubiquitous in Upper Peninsula cuisine that they are now commonly found in most grocery stores and supermarkets.

Maple syrup is a highly prized local delicacy. Fresh Great Lakes fish, such as the lake trout, whitefish, and (in the spring) smelt are widely eaten. There is minimal concern about contamination of fish from Lake Superior waters. Smoked fish is also popular. Thimbleberry jam and chokecherry jelly are a treat.

== Economy ==
=== Industries ===
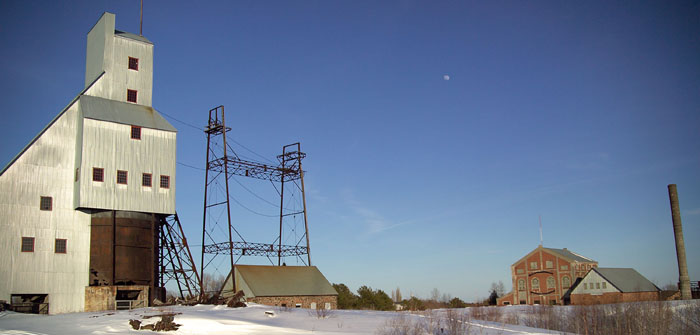
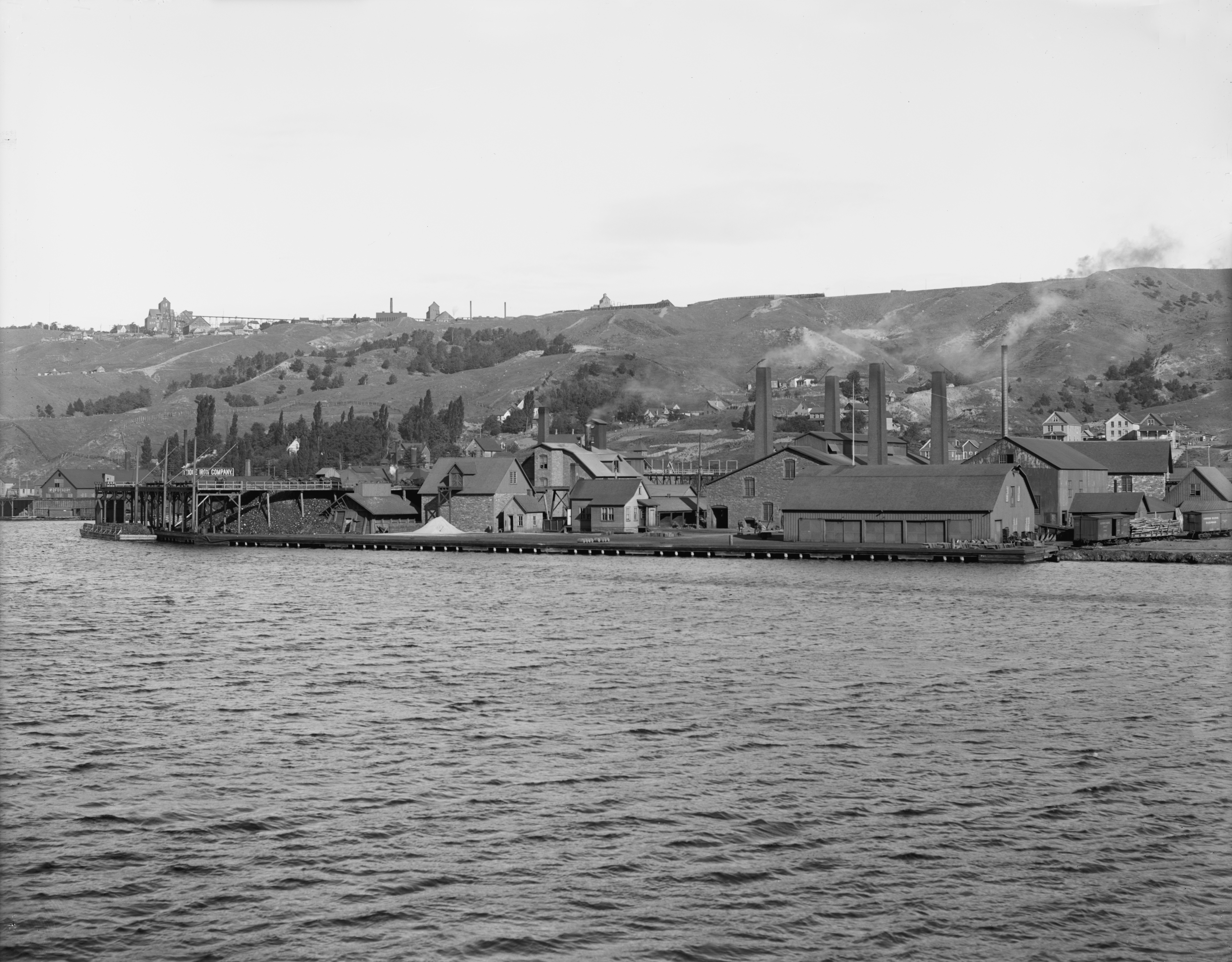
Top: The Quincy Mine near Hancock, which mined copper until 1945. Bottom: Smelter at Quincy Hill, circa 1906.

The Upper Peninsula is rich in mineral deposits, including iron, copper, nickel, and silver. Small amounts of gold have also been discovered and mined. In the 19th century, mining dominated the economy, and the UP became home to many isolated company towns. For many years, mines in the Keweenaw Peninsula were the world's largest producers of copper. The mines began declining as early as 1913, with most closing temporarily during the Great Depression. Mines reopened during World War II, but almost all quickly closed after the war ended. The last copper mine in the Copper Country was the White Pine mine, which closed in 1995. Marquette County sits along the Marquette Iron Range, which sent out a significant portion of the iron ore mined in the United States for many years. As of 2020, Marquette County is home to one remaining iron ore mine and one nickel and copper mine.

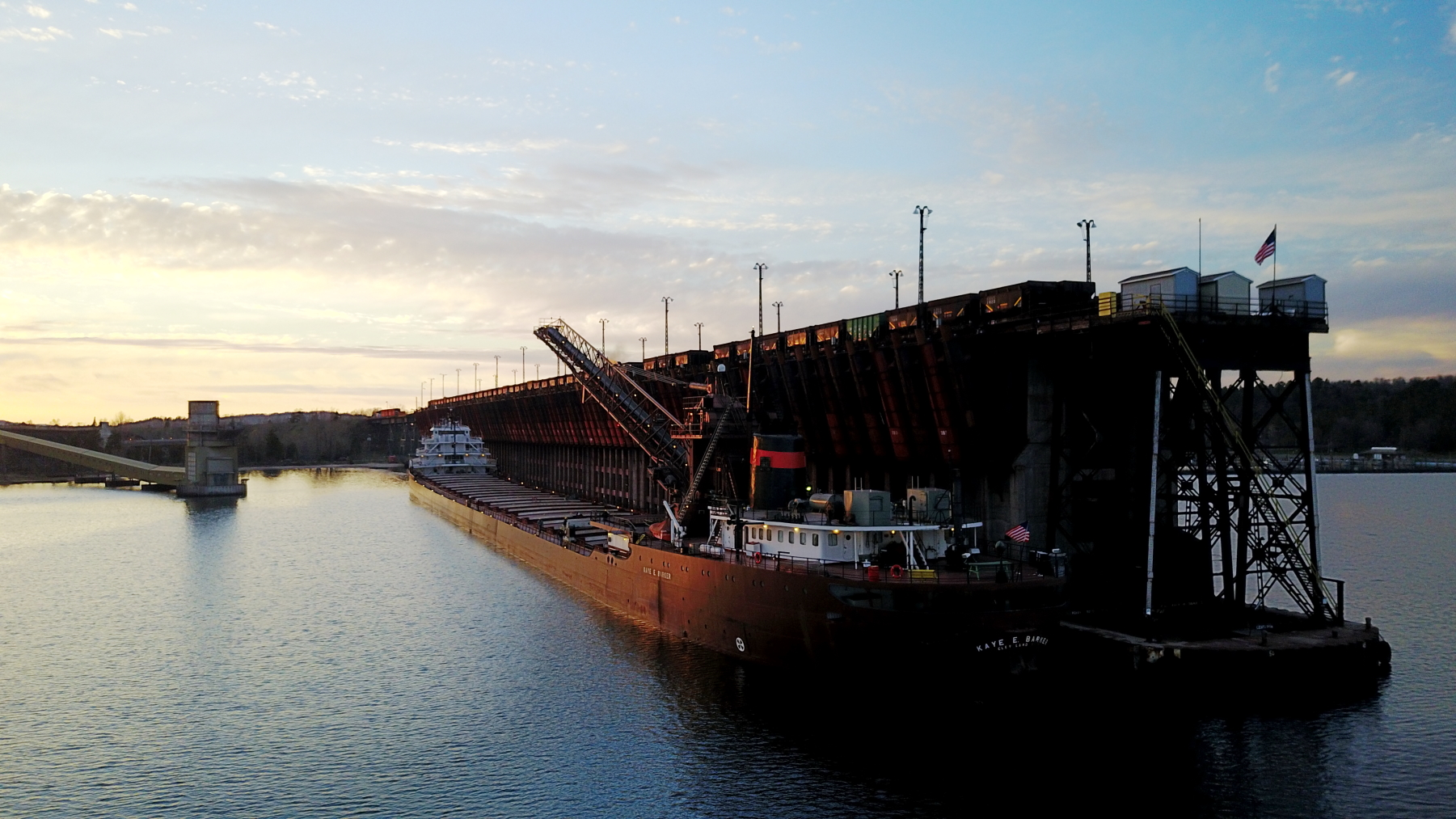
The Presque Isle Ore Dock in Marquette, a vital Great Lakes shipping port for southbound cargo, mostly iron and coal

From approximately 1870 to 1915, about 32 quarries mined Jacobsville Sandstone in the Upper Peninsula, particularly near Marquette and the community of Jacobsville. The sandstone was used in many buildings, both locally and around the United States.

Since logging of white pine began in the 1880s, timber has been an important industry. Stands of hemlock and hardwood in the western reaches of the forest experienced larger scale selection-cutting beginning in the mid-20th century. Because of the highly seasonal climate and the short growing season, agriculture is limited in the Upper Peninsula, though potatoes, strawberries and a few other small fruits are grown.

Tourism has become the main industry in recent decades. In 2005, ShermanTravel, LLC listed the Upper Peninsula as #10 in its assessment of all travel destinations worldwide. The peninsula has extensive coastline on the Great Lakes, large tracts of state and national forests, cedar swamps, more than 150 waterfalls, and low population densities. Because of the skiing, camping, boating, fishing, snowmobiling, hunting, and hiking opportunities, many Lower Peninsula and Wisconsin families spend their vacations in the UP, and tourists visit from Detroit, Chicago, Grand Rapids, Milwaukee, and other metropolitan areas. The opening of the Mackinac Bridge in 1957 (see below) has made the Upper Peninsula easily accessible to tourists from the Lower Peninsula and southeast of Michigan, and has helped make the UP a year-round tourist destination.

During the Cold War, the U.P. was home to two U.S. Air Force bases, Kincheloe south of Sault Ste. Marie, and K.I. Sawyer, south of Marquette. Both were bases of the Strategic Air Command (SAC), with B-52H bombers; Kincheloe closed in 1977, and Sawyer in 1995.

In 2004, microbreweries began opening across the Upper Peninsula; 14 opened by 2014, and 23 by 2019. In 2019, their annual economic impact totaled $346 million. As of 2018, three of Michigan's fifty largest breweries were in the Upper Peninsula: Keweenaw Brewing Company, Blackrocks Brewery, and the Ore Dock Brewing Company.

=== Media ===
There are five daily newspapers published in the Upper Peninsula, The Mining Journal in Marquette, The Daily Mining Gazette in Houghton, The Daily News in Iron Mountain, the Daily Press in Escanaba, and The Evening News in Sault Ste. Marine. All but The Evening News are owned by Ogden Newspapers, with the former being owned by Gannett. The Mining Journal, is the only daily newspaper that publishes a Sunday edition, which is distributed, with the exception of Chippewa and eastern Mackinac counties, across the entire UP (the other six days are distributed in its local area only). Additional, there are monthly and student publications serving the region.

The Upper Peninsula is home to eight television stations, 15 AM broadcasting stations, and 90 FM broadcasting stations. Most of the UP lies within the Marquette media market. The eastern three counties of the peninsula are in the Cadillac-Traverse City market, while Gogebic County in the western UP is served by stations in the Duluth market, and Menominee County in the southern UP is served by stations from the Green Bay region. The peninsula's oldest television station is WLUC-TV in Negaunee Township, while the UP's longest continually operated radio station is WCCY in Houghton. Most of the region's radio signals originate from the population centers of Sault Ste. Marie, Escanaba, Marquette, or Houghton. Due to the vast and sparsely populated geography of the UP, many of the FM stations operate at maximum effective radiated power.

== Government ==
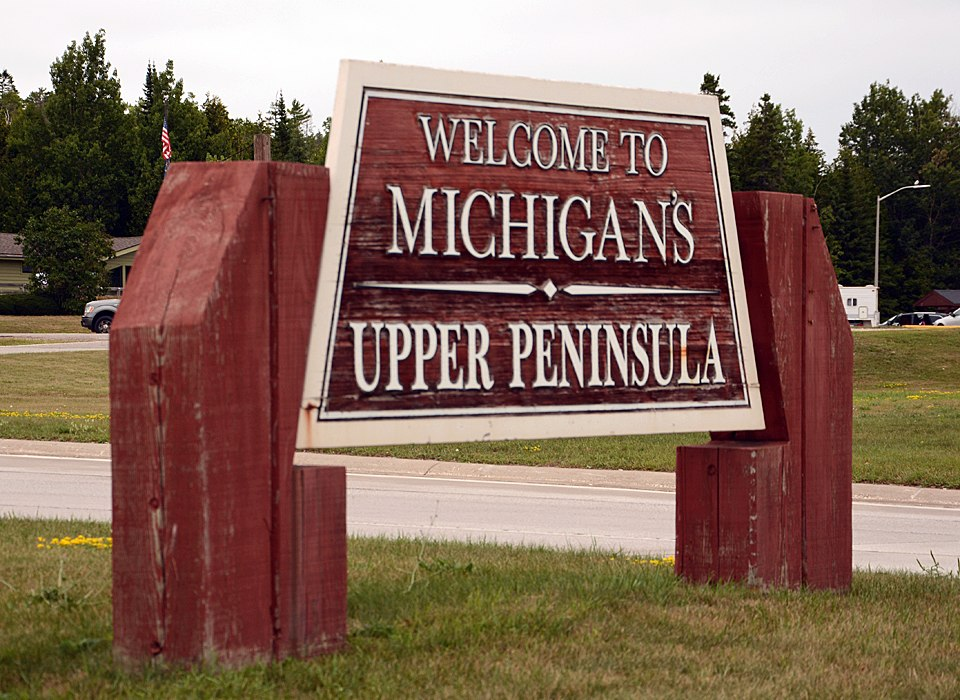
Upper Peninsula welcome sign along I-75

Map of the Upper Peninsula's fifteen counties

There are 15 counties in the Upper Peninsula. All counties in the UP are part of Michigan's 1st congressional district. Jack Bergman, a Republican, has been the U.S. representative for this district since January 2017.

In Michigan's 2010 gubernatorial election Republican Rick Snyder carried every UP county but one, Gogebic, on his way to victory over his Democratic opponent, Virg Bernero.

State prisons are located in Baraga, Marquette, Munising, Newberry, and Kincheloe.

=== Politics ===
Upper Peninsula vote by party in presidential elections
Year	REP	DEM	Others
2024	58.75% 101,383	39.67% 68,453	1.58% 2,730
2020	57.34% 95,351	41.04% 68,249	1.62% 2,695
2016	56.40% 82,018	37.77% 54,923	5.83% 8,476
2012	50.80% 73,529	47.49% 68,747	1.71% 2,477
2008	46.12% 69,647	51.82% 78,257	2.06% 3,108
2004	51.52% 78,276	47.31% 71,888	1.17% 1,781
2000	50.61% 70,256	45.95% 63,791	3.43% 4,768
1996	36.75% 48,134	51.05% 66,856	12.20% 15,974
1992	33.37% 47,447	46.46% 66,060	20.18% 28,695
1988	47.86% 63,151	51.65% 68,152	0.49% 645
1984	54.07% 75,591	45.56% 63,695	0.37% 516
1980	47.78% 71,025	44.12% 65,579	8.10% 12,046
1976	48.04% 67,596	50.70% 71,338	1.25% 1,762
1972	54.08% 72,967	44.23% 59,670	1.69% 2,279
1968	44.75% 55,070	50.26% 61,858	4.99% 6,141
1964	32.40% 41,267	67.46% 85,923	0.14% 183
1960	48.05% 64,764	51.76% 69,765	0.19% 252
1956	58.72% 77,576	41.12% 54,326	0.17% 219
1952	55.09% 74,639	44.45% 60,230	0.46% 625
1948	47.28% 58,346	48.46% 59,801	4.27% 5,265
1944	45.63% 58,704	53.88% 69,310	0.49% 630
1940	46.14% 69.164	53.26% 79.835	0.67% 1,003
1936	39.21% 54,153	58.78% 81,176	2.02% 2,784
1932	48.73% 61,473	47.57% 60,012	3.71% 4,677
1928	61.53% 65,913	37.04% 39.677	1.44% 1,542
1924	68.51% 61,396	8.10% 7,261	23.39% 20,964
1920	74.50% 61,475	19.24% 15,876	6.27% 5,171
1916	59.51% 34,269	35.31% 20,333	5.17% 2,979
1912	31.41% 15,825	19.46% 9,803	49.14% 24,757
1908	72.69% 37,194	21.12% 10,805	6.20% 3,170
1904	79.83% 37,400	14.87% 6,965	5.31% 2,486
1900	73.00% 34,180	24.31% 11,382	2.69% 1,258
1896	68.39% 29,591	28.65% 12,397	2.95% 1,278

During most of the "System of 1896", the Upper Peninsula was overwhelmingly Republican even by the standards of Michigan during this era. Some of its counties would often vote for the Republican candidate by among the widest margins in the nation. However, the region's politics began shifting in 1924, when the Upper Peninsula was the strongest region in Michigan for the insurgent candidacy of Progressive Robert M. La Follette. After the Great Depression and as the New Deal era progressed, the Upper Peninsula became more Democratic than the state as a whole, voting that way when the state did not in 1940, 1948, 1976, and 1988. However, the region would move back to Republicans in the 21st century, voting for the GOP candidate every time except in 2008.

=== Proposed statehood ===
Due to the geographic separation and perceived cultural and political differences from the Lower Peninsula, at various times there have been proposals for the Upper Peninsula to secede from Michigan as a 51st state named Superior, sometimes including portions of northern Wisconsin and/or the northern Lower Peninsula. Several prominent legislators, including the region's long-serving state representative Dominic Jacobetti, attempted unsuccessfully to gain passage of such a bill in the 1970s. It would be the least populous state in the union, and as stronger connections to the rest of Michigan have developed since completion of the Mackinac Bridge in the 1950s, the proposal has remained largely dormant since the 1970s.

=== Notable attractions ===
- Adventure Mine
- Agate Falls
- Au Sable Light Station
- Black River National Forest Scenic Byway
- Bond Falls
- Brockway Mountain Drive
- Calumet Theatre
- Calumet Downtown Historic District
- Castle Rock
- Copper Harbor
- Copper Peak, Ironwood Township
- DeYoung Family Zoo
- Fayette Historic State Park
- Fort Mackinac
- Fort Wilkins Historic State Park
- Garlyn Zoo
- Grand Hotel (Mackinac Island)
- Grand Island National Recreation Area
- Grand Sable Dunes
- The Great Lakes Shipwreck Museum
- Iron Mountain Iron Mine – Vulcan
- Isle Royale National Park
- Keweenaw National Historical Park
- Keweenaw Waterway and Portage Lake Lift Bridge
- Kitch-iti-kipi
- Lake Superior
- Lake Superior State University, Lakers
- Laughing Whitefish Falls
- Mackinac Bridge
- Mackinac Island
- The Marquette Lighthouse
- Marquette Mountain Ski Resort
- Michigan Iron Industry Museum – Negaunee
- Michigan Technological University
- Mount Bohemia ski center (with the highest vertical drop, 900 feet (270 m), in the Midwest)
- Munising Falls
- National Ski Hall of Fame
- Northern Michigan University
- Marquette Ore Dock
- Paulding Light
- Pictured Rocks National Lakeshore
- Pine Mountain ski jump in Iron Mountain is one of the largest artificial ski jumps in the world.
- Point Iroquois Lighthouse
- Porcupine Mountains State Park
- Presque Isle Park, Marquette, Michigan
- Quincy Copper Mine offering guided tours
- Seney National Wildlife Refuge
- Ski Brule in Iron River
- The Soo Locks
- Suicide Hill Ski Jump, Ishpeming, Michigan
- Sylvania Wilderness
- Tahquamenon Falls State Park
- Upper Peninsula Children's Museum – Marquette

=== Casinos ===
American Indian casinos contribute to the tourist attractions and are popular in the UP. Originally the casinos were simple, one-room affairs. Some of the casinos are now quite elaborate and are being developed as part of resort and conference facilities, including features such as golf courses, pool and spa, dining, and rooms to accommodate guests.

- Bay Mills Resort & Casino – Brimley
- Island Resort & Casino – Harris
- Kewadin Casinos – Christmas; Hessel; Manistique; St. Ignace; Sault Ste. Marie
- Kings Club Casino – Brimley (Closed permanently)
- Lac Vieux Desert Casino – Watersmeet
- Ojibwa Casinos – Baraga; Marquette

== Transportation ==
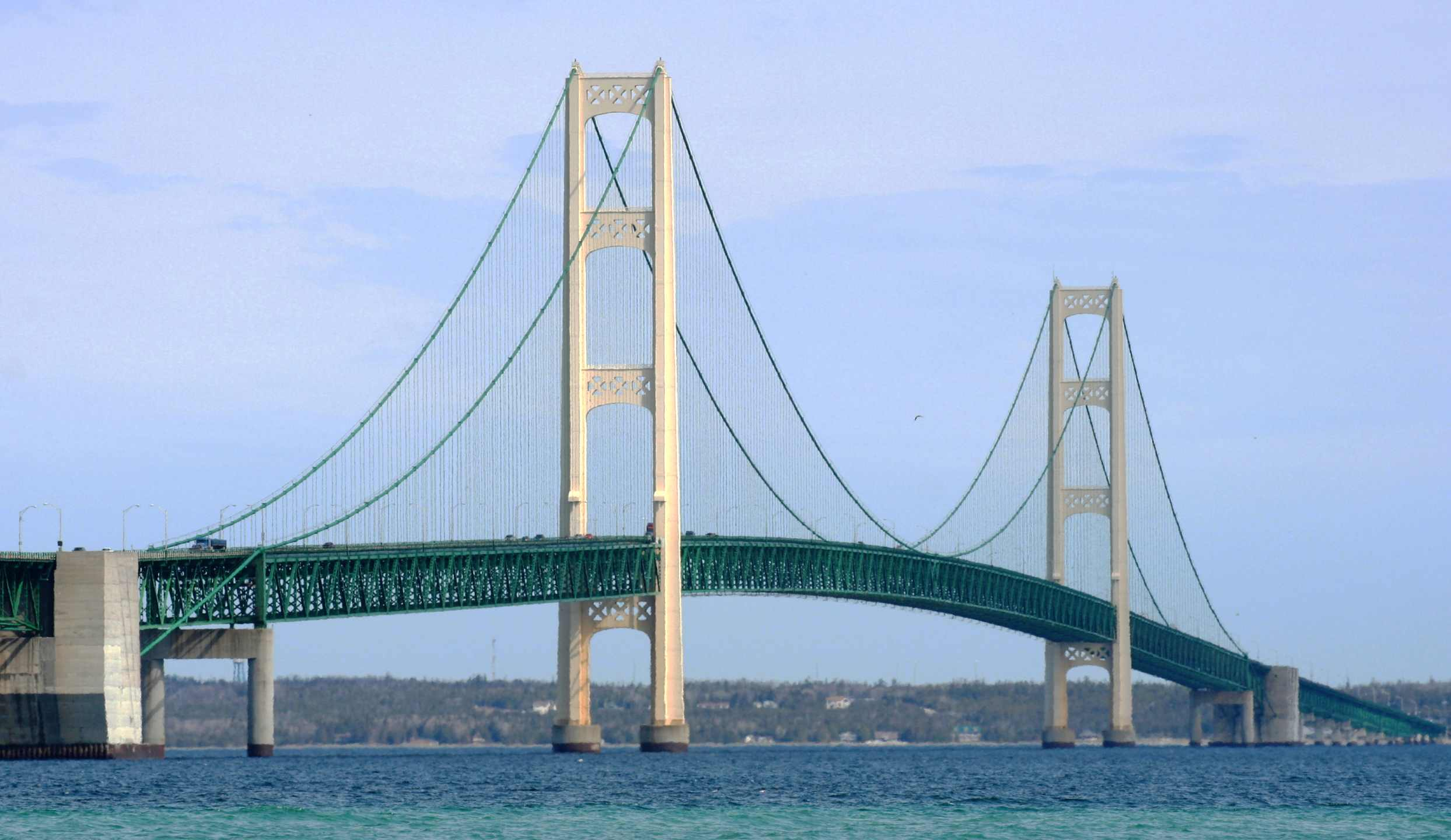
The Mackinac Bridge, which connects Mackinaw City in the Lower Peninsula to St. Ignace.

The Upper Peninsula is separated from the Lower by the Straits of Mackinac, five miles (8 km) across at the narrowest, and is connected to it by the Mackinac Bridge at St. Ignace, one of the longest suspension bridges in the world. Until the bridge was completed in 1957, travel between the two peninsulas was difficult and slow (and sometimes even impossible during winter). In 1881, the Mackinac Transportation Company was established by three railroads, the Michigan Central Railroad, the Grand Rapids and Indiana Railroad, and the Detroit, Mackinac and Marquette Railroad, to operate a railroad car ferry across the Straits. Beginning in 1923, the State of Michigan operated automobile ferries between the two peninsulas. At the busiest times of year the wait was several hours long, much longer at holidays. In winter, travel was possible over the ice only after the straits had solidly frozen.

=== Highways ===
There are one Interstate Highway, five US Highways and 24 other state highways in the Upper Peninsula. Interstate 75 is the only freeway in the region and runs from the Mackinac Bridge at St. Ignace to the International Bridge at Sault Ste. Marie. Two highways run the east–west length of the peninsula, US Highway 2 along the south and M-28 to the north. US 41 runs north–south through the central and western UP, connecting Menominee, Escanaba, Marquette and Houghton before terminating near the tip of the Keweenaw at Copper Harbor. M-185 encircles Mackinac Island as the only state highway in the country without motor vehicles.

The United States Forest Service and Federal Highway Administration have designated certain roads within the several National Forests in the UP as Federal Forest Highways. State-maintained highways closest to the Upper Peninsula's Great Lakes shorelines are marked by the Michigan Department of Transportation (MDOT) with signs indicating that they are part of the Great Lakes Circle Tour, a designated scenic road system connecting all of the Great Lakes and the St. Lawrence River. MDOT has also designated five UP highways as Pure Michigan Byways for their historic, recreational or scenic qualities. They are: US 2 in Iron County (Iron County Heritage Trail) and in Schoolcraft and Mackinac counties (Top of the Lake Scenic Byway), US 41 from Houghton to Copper Harbor (Copper County Trail, also a National Scenic Byway), M-35 (UP Hidden Coast Recreational Heritage Trail), M-123 (Tahquamenon Scenic Heritage Route) and M-134 (M-134 North Huron Byway)

=== Airports ===
There are 43 airports in the Upper Peninsula. Of these, six airports have commercial passenger service: Gogebic-Iron County Airport north of Ironwood, Houghton County Memorial Airport southwest of Calumet, Ford Airport west of Iron Mountain, Sawyer International Airport south of Marquette, Delta County Airport in Escanaba, and Chippewa County International Airport south of Sault Ste. Marie. There are 19 other public use airports with a hard surface runway. These are used for general aviation and charter. Notably, Mackinac Island, Beaver Island, and Drummond Island are all accessible by airports. There are five public access airports with turf runways and thirteen airports for the private use of their owners. There is only one control tower in the Upper Peninsula, at Sawyer.

=== Ferries and bridges ===
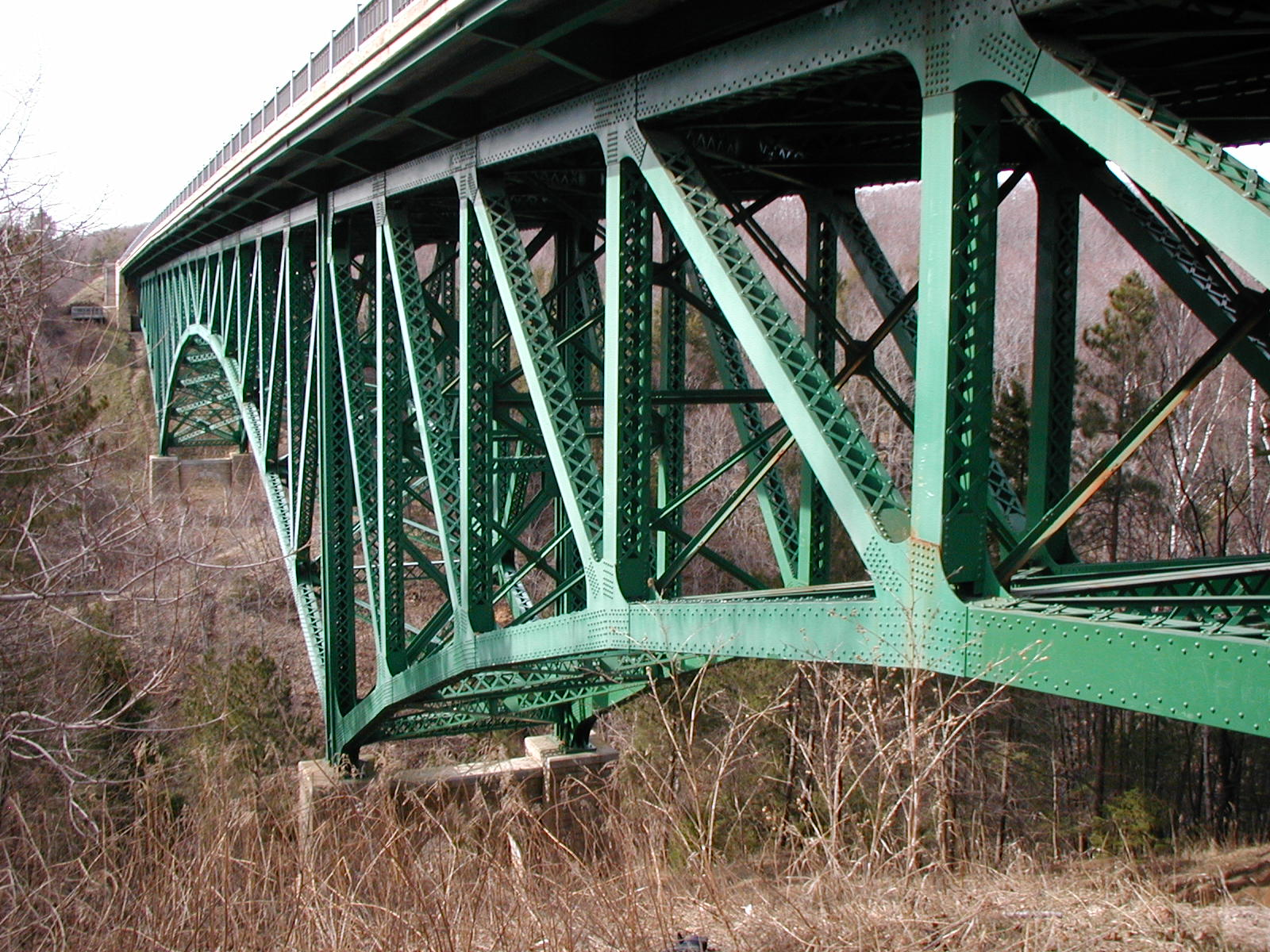
The Cut River Bridge in Mackinac County, another notable bridge of the U.P.

The Eastern Upper Peninsula Transportation Authority operates car ferries in its area. These include ferries for Sugar Island, Neebish Island, and Drummond Island. Two ferry companies run passenger ferries from St. Ignace to Mackinac Island.

The three major bridges in the Upper Peninsula are:

- Mackinac Bridge, connecting the Lower Peninsula of Michigan with the Upper;
- Sault Ste. Marie International Bridge, which connects the city of Sault Ste. Marie to its twin city of Sault Ste. Marie in Canada; and
- Portage Lift Bridge, which crosses Portage Lake. The Portage Lift Bridge is the world's heaviest and widest double-decked vertical lift bridge. Its center span lifts to provide about 100 feet (30 m) of clearance for ships. Since rail traffic was discontinued in the Keweenaw, the lower deck is used to accommodate snowmobile traffic in the winter. As the only land-based link between the north and south sections of the Keweenaw Peninsula, the bridge is crucial to transportation.

=== Railways ===
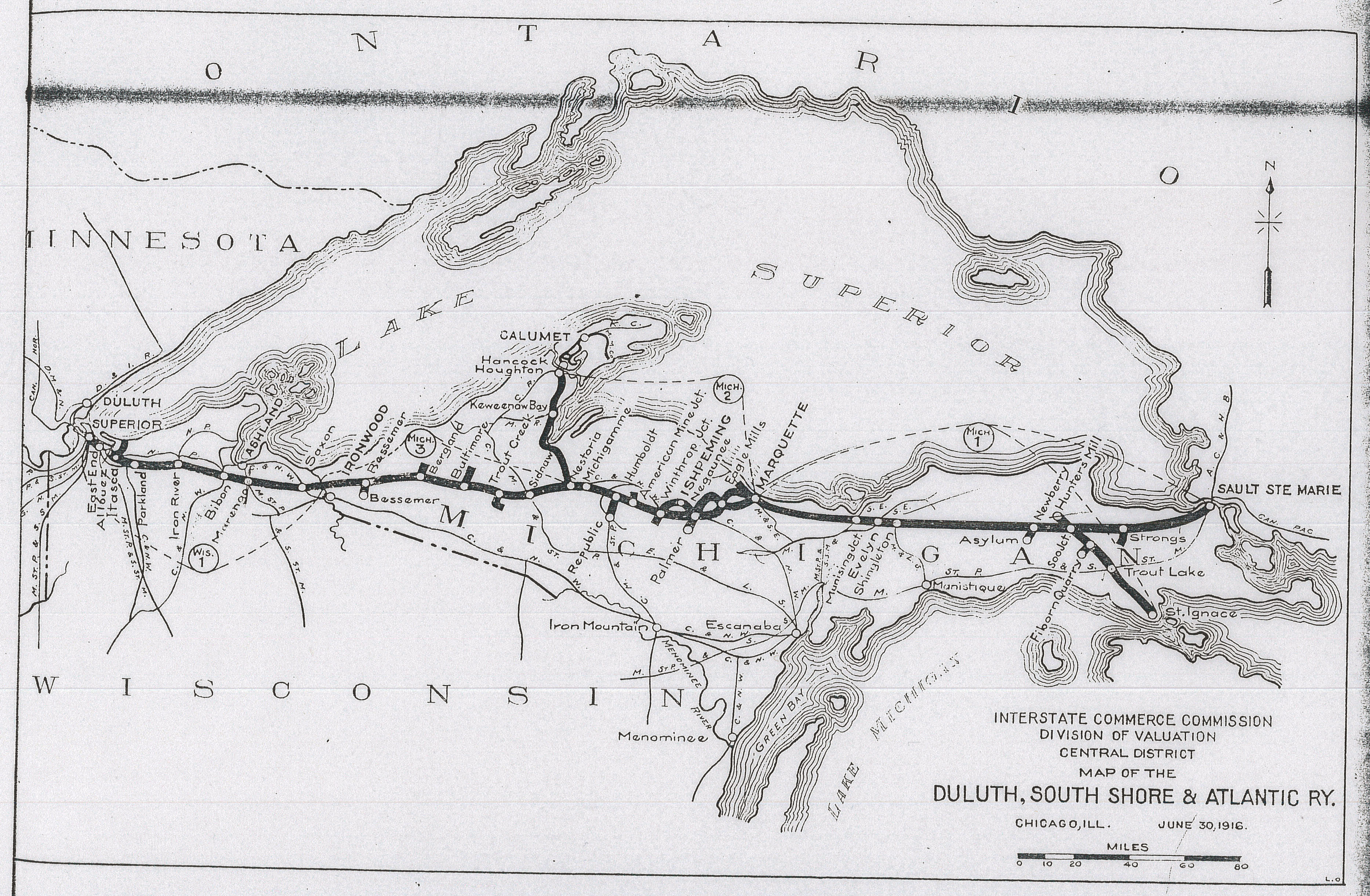
Map showing the route of the Duluth, South Shore and Atlantic Railroad in 1916

Historically two railroads originally crossed the Upper Peninsula east to west: the Minneapolis, St. Paul and Sault Ste. Marie Railway, informally known as the Soo Line, running west from Sault Ste. Marie roughly along the Lake Michigan shore, and the Duluth, South Shore and Atlantic Railroad running west from St. Ignace roughly along the Lake Superior shore. In 1960, both railroads were merged into the Soo Line Railroad, the U.S. arm of the Canadian Pacific Railway. The Soo Line trackage in the Upper Peninsula was purchased by the Wisconsin Central Railroad in 1987. In 1997, the Wisconsin Central also purchased from the Union Pacific Railroad the former Chicago and North Western Railway line running into the Upper Peninsula from Wisconsin. The Wisconsin Central was in turn purchased by the Canadian National Railway in 2001. The Canadian National now operates much of the remaining railroad trackage in the Upper Peninsula.

The following is a list of shortline railroads in the Upper Peninsula:

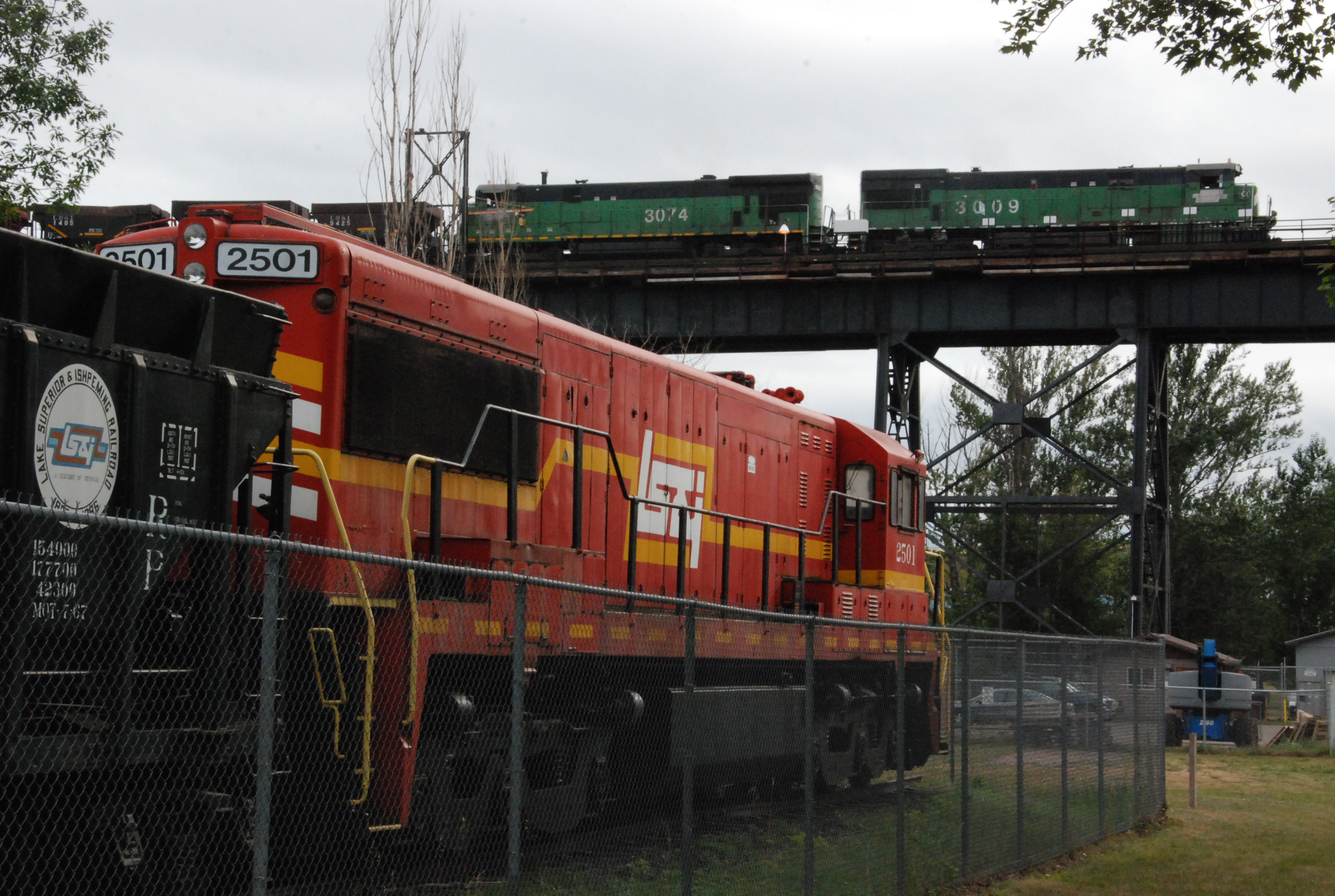
Lake Superior and Ishpeming Railroad locomotives at the Presque Isle Ore Dock in Marquette

- Lake Superior and Ishpeming Railroad: Transports iron ore over a 16-mile (26 km) line from the Empire-Tilden Mine (operated by Cleveland-Cliffs Inc.), south of Ishpeming and Negaunee, to Marquette's port on Lake Superior.
- Escanaba and Lake Superior Railroad: Chartered in 1898, the E&LS is a shortline railroad with 347 miles (558 km) of trackage connecting Escanaba, Ontonagon, Republic, and Green Bay, Wisconsin, with a common junction at Channing, and a spur to Nestoria from Sidnaw.
- Mineral Range Railroad: Since 2002, this railroad has been operating a 3-mile-long (4.8 km) industrial track from Ishpeming to National Mine to serve an explosives plant. The railroad expanded in 2014 to include 12 miles (19 km) of former Canadian National and Lake Superior and Ishpeming rail lines between Ishpeming and Humboldt to serve the Humboldt Mill. The railroad takes its name from the former Mineral Range Railroad in the Keweenaw Peninsula.
- Grand Elk Railroad: Originally formed in 2009 in the Lower Peninsula, the railroad owned by Watco expanded to the UP in 2021 to operate former Duluth, South Shore and Atlantic lines that were divested by Canadian National. This includes a line from Trout Lake to Munising and an out of service line to a former mine in White Pine.

=== Bus systems ===
Despite its rural character, there are public buses in several counties of the Upper Peninsula. These include MarqTran serving Marquette, as well as intercity services provided by Indian Trails.

== Notable people ==
- Nick Baumgartner, Olympic gold medalist in mixed snowboard cross at the 2022 Winter Olympics, is from Iron River.
- Da Yoopers, comedy music/sketch group
- Robert J. Flaherty, the filmmaker who directed and produced the documentary Nanook of the North, in 1922, from Iron Mountain.
- George Gipp, the "Gipper"—immortalized in the film Knute Rockne, All American—was born in Laurium. He was the first All-American player of the Notre Dame football program.
- Crystal Hayes, 2005 Miss Michigan, from Rock.
- Tom Izzo, Michigan State basketball coach a native of Iron Mountain, attended Northern Michigan University.
- Clarence L. "Kelly" Johnson, aircraft engineer and aeronautical innovator, was born in Ishpeming.
- John Lautner, one of Frank Lloyd Wright's most successful Taliesin fellows, a native of Marquette and alumnus of NMU.
- Mitchell Leisen, film director, was born Menominee in 1898.
- Steve Mariucci, former San Francisco 49ers and Detroit Lions head coach; a native of Iron Mountain, attended Northern Michigan University.
- Terry O'Quinn, actor on Lost, was born in Sault Ste. Marie in 1952 and grew up in Newberry.
- Chase Osborn was the only governor of Michigan from the Upper Peninsula (1911–1913).
- Pam Reed, ultrarunner, grew up in Palmer, and graduated from Michigan Technological University.
- Gene Ronzani was a professional football running back for the Chicago Bears and head coach of the Green Bay Packers from 1950 to 1953; born in Iron Mountain.
- Abby Roque, the first indigenous person to play for the United States women's national ice hockey team and an Olympic medalist, played high school hockey in Sault Ste. Marie.
- Rob Rubick, Detroit Lions tight end and current Fox Sports Detroit analyst, from Newberry.
- Glenn T. Seaborg, a Nobel Prize-winning chemist and major contributor in the discovery of several of the transuranium elements, was born in Ishpeming.
- Mike Shaw, professional wrestler, was born in Skandia.
- Mary Chase Perry Stratton, founder of Pewabic Pottery, was born in Hancock.
- Lou Thesz, professional wrestler who held the NWA World Heavyweight Championship longer than anyone in history, was born in Banat, on April 24, 1916.
- James Tolkan, an actor who appeared in Back to the Future and Top Gun, born in Calumet.
- John D. Voelker, Justice of the Michigan Supreme Court, wrote the best-selling book Anatomy of a Murder under the pen name Robert Traver. Directed by Otto Preminger, the film was shot in Big Bay and Ishpeming with some courtroom scenes in Marquette.
- Bill Ivey, the former head of the National Endowment for the Arts under the Clinton Administration was born in Calumet.
- Jake Witt is an American football Offensive tackle for the Indianapolis Colts of the National Football League (NFL). He was drafted in the 7th Round of the 2023 NFL draft with the 236th overall pick.

== See also ==
- List of counties in Michigan
- Heikki Lunta, mythological character
- Stormy Kromer cap
