= Ingalls, Michigan =

- Unincorporated community
- Location within the state of Michigan Ingalls (the United States)
- Coordinates: 45°22′37″N 87°36′40″W
- Country: United States
- State: Michigan
- County: Menominee
- Township: Mellen
- Elevation: 709 ft (216 m)
- Time zone: UTC-6 (Central (CST))
  - Summer (DST): UTC-5 (CDT)
- ZIP code(s): 49848
- Area code: 906
- GNIS feature ID: 629032

Ingalls is an unincorporated community in Menominee County, Michigan, United States. Ingalls is located in Mellen Township along U.S. Highway 41, 2.5 miles (4.0 km) south of Stephenson. Ingalls has a post office with ZIP code 49848.

== History ==
Thomas Caldwell first settled Ingalls in 1858. The community was named after Eleazer Stillman Ingalls (1820–1879), a judge who organized Menominee County, in 1863. A station on the Chicago and North Western Railway opened in Ingalls in 1872. A post office opened in Ingalls on June 20, 1879; Louis Dobeas (1847–1933) was the first postmaster.
