= Mellen Township, Michigan =

- Civil township
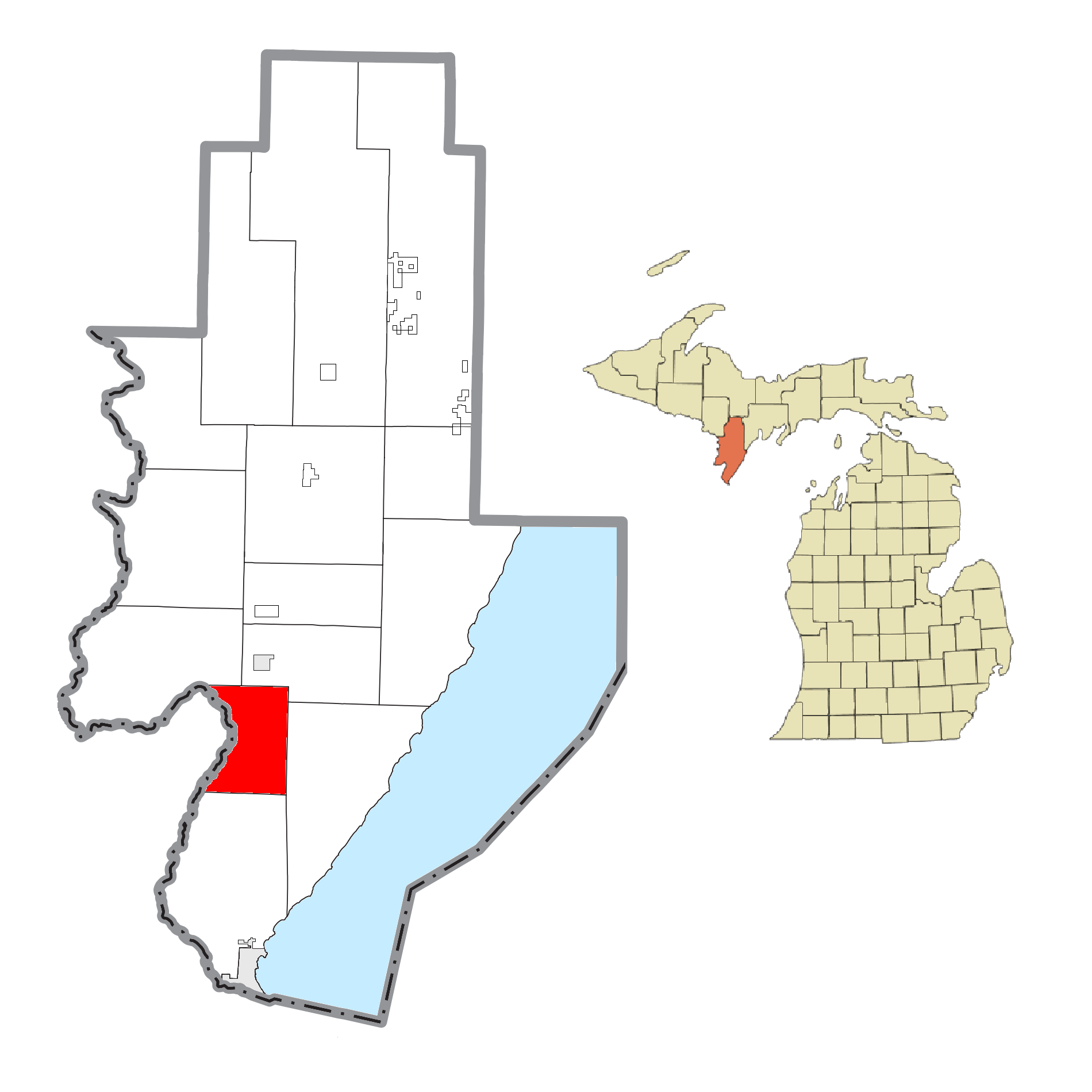
- Location within Menominee County and the state of Michigan

- Location within Michigan Location within the United States
- Coordinates: 45°20′39″N 87°37′41″W
- Country: United States
- State: Michigan
- County: Menominee

Area
  - Total: 31.4 sq mi (81 km^{2})
  - Land: 30.8 sq mi (80 km^{2})
  - Water: 0.6 sq mi (1.6 km^{2})
- Elevation: 699 ft (213 m)

Population (2020)
  - Total: 1,109
  - Density: 36/sq mi (14/km^{2})
- Time zone: UTC-6 (Central (CST))
  - Summer (DST): UTC-5 (CDT)
- ZIP Codes: 49893 (Wallace); 49848 (Ingalls); 49887 (Stephenson)
- Area code: 906
- FIPS code: 26-109-52860
- GNIS feature ID: 1626718

Mellen Township is a civil township of Menominee County in the U.S. state of Michigan. The population was 1,109 at the 2020 census. It is named after pioneer settler Mellen Smith (1829–1905), who served as the first postmaster at Wallace.

== Geography ==
Mellen Township is in southern Menominee County, bordered to the west by the Menominee River, across which is Marinette County in the state of Wisconsin. U.S. Route 41 crosses the township, leading south 15 miles (24 km) to Menominee, the county seat, and north 26 miles (42 km) to Powers.

According to the United States Census Bureau, the township has a total area of 31.4 square miles (81 km^{2}), of which 30.8 square miles (80 km^{2}) are land and 0.6 square miles (1.6 km^{2}), or 1.80%, are water.

== Communities ==
- Ingalls is an unincorporated community along U.S. Highway 41, 2.5 miles (4.0 km) south of Stephenson. Ingalls has a post office with ZIP code 49848.
- Wallace is an unincorporated community located 15 miles (24 km) north of Menominee on US Highway 41. It is a small village with the DeYoung Family Zoo, a used-car dealership, a tavern, lumber yard, post office, ice maker, wood businesses, grocery market, service station, and a liquidator store. There are also three churches: Country Bible Church (non-denominational), a Covenant Church, and a Lutheran church. The Mellen Elementary School is also located in Wallace. Wallace was originally called "Wallace's Siding" after Wallace Sutherland (1858–1890), who was assigned to the railroad depot. It was then shorted to "Wallace" by the time the post office was established in 1877. On April 12, 1931, Wallace suffered a fire that destroyed most of the village. Wallace has a post office with ZIP code 49893.

== Demographics ==
Historical population
Census	Pop.	Note	%±
1900	1,022		—
1910	1,062		3.9%
1920	808		−23.9%
1930	753		−6.8%
1940	865		14.9%
1950	878		1.5%
1960	800		−8.9%
1970	822		2.8%
1980	1,159		41.0%
1990	1,183		2.1%
2000	1,260		6.5%
2010	1,150		−8.7%
2020	1,109		−3.6%
U.S. Decennial Census

As of the census of 2000, there were 1,260 people, 520 households, and 368 families residing in the township. In 2020, there were 1,109 people in the township.

== Notable people ==
- John Noppenberg, American football player
