= Marinette micropolitan area =

Marinette–Iron Mountain, WI–MI Area
- Combined Statistical Area
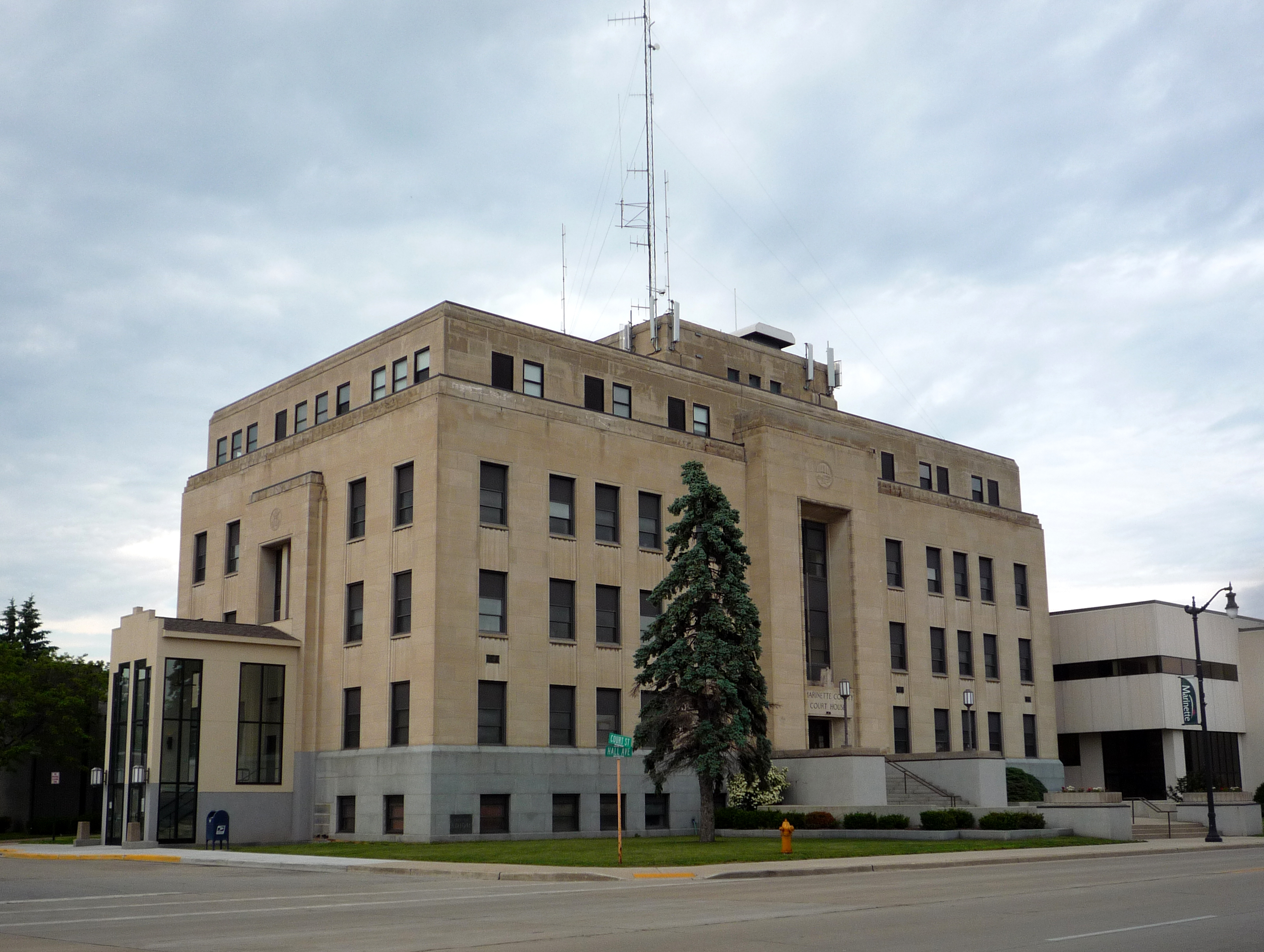
- Marinette County Courthouse
Map of Marinette–Iron Mountain, WI–MI CSA
Marinette, WI–MI µSA
Iron Mountain, MI–WI µSA
City of Marinette, WI
City of Iron Mountain, MI
- Country: United States
- State: Wisconsin; Michigan
- Largest city: Marinette, WI
- Other city: Iron Mountain, MI
- Time zone: UTC−06:00 (CST)
  - Summer (DST): UTC−05:00 (CDT)

The Marinette Micropolitan Statistical Area, as defined by the United States Census Bureau, is an area consisting of two counties – Marinette County in Wisconsin and Menominee County in Michigan – anchored by the city of Marinette, Wisconsin. As of the 2000 census, the μSA had a population of 68,710 (though a July 1, 2009 estimate placed the population at 65,937).

== Communities ==
Western side

Eastern side

The two cities on July 27, 2020

=== Menominee County, Michigan ===
- Carney
- Cedar River
- Cedarville Township
- Daggett
- Daggett Township
- Faithorn Township
- Gourley Township
- Harris Township
- Holmes Township
- Ingallston Township
- Lake Township
- Mellen Township
- Menominee
- Menominee Township
- Meyer Township
- Nadeau Township
- Spalding Township
- Stephenson
- Stephenson Township
- Wallace, Michigan

=== Marinette County, Wisconsin ===
- Amberg, Wisconsin
- Town of Amberg
- Town of Athelstane
- Town of Beaver
- Town of Beecher
- Coleman
- Crivitz
- Town of Dunbar
- Town of Goodman
- Town of Grover
- Town of Lake
- Marinette, Wisconsin (Principal city)
- Town of Middle Inlet
- Niagara, Wisconsin
- Town of Niagara
- Town of Pembine
- Peshtigo
- Town of Peshtigo
- Town of Porterfield
- Pound
- Town of Pound
- Powers
- Town of Silver Cliff
- Town of Stephenson
- Town of Wagner
- Wausaukee
- Town of Wausaukee

== View at night ==
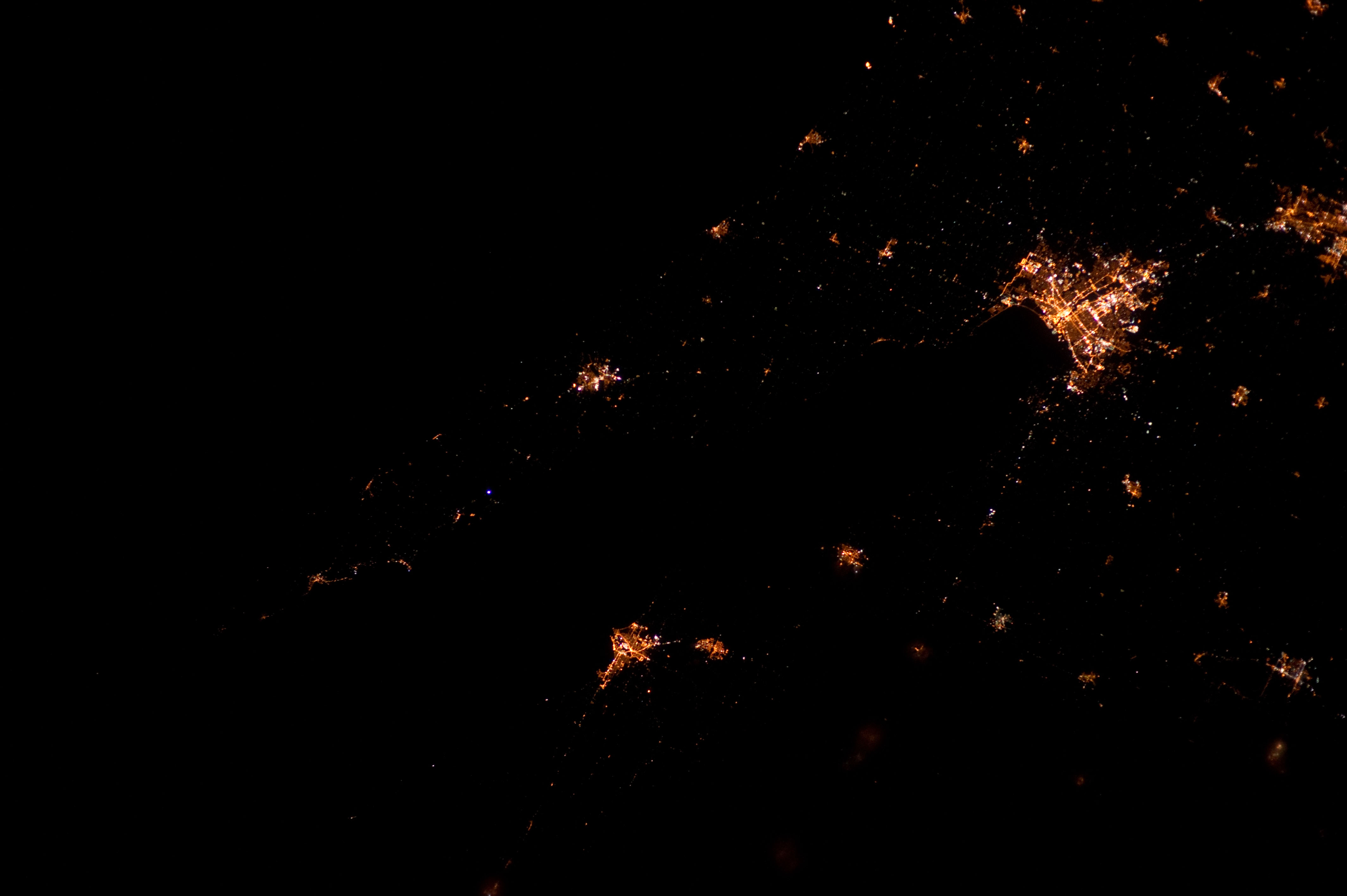
A portion of the micropolitan area, taken 1:10 AM CDT, March 27, 2012 during Expedition 30 of the ISS.

== Demographics ==
As of the census of 2000, there were 68,710 people, 28,114 households, and 18,835 families residing within the USA. The racial makeup of the area was 97.40% White, 0.18% African American, 1.15% Native American, 0.25% Asian, 0.01% Pacific Islander, 0.20% from other races, and 0.80% from two or more races. Hispanic or Latino of any race were 0.75% of the population.

The median income for a household in the USA was $34,072, and the median income for a family was $41,312. Males had a median income of $32,170 versus $21,638 for females. The per capita income for the USA was $17,201.

== See also ==
- Wisconsin census statistical areas
- Michigan census statistical areas
