= Cedar River (Menominee County, Michigan) =

River in United States of America

Coordinates: 45°24′35″N 87°21′05″W

Location
- Country: United States

Physical characteristics
- Mouth
  - location: Green Bay
  - elevation: 581 ft (177 m)

Basin features
- River system: Lake Michigan

Cedar River (also known as the Big Cedar River) is a 67.1-mile-long (108.0 km) river in the U.S. state of Michigan. It rises in the northern part of Menominee County at and flows mostly south and east to empty into Green Bay of Lake Michigan at in the community of Cedar River.

The Little Cedar River, a tributary of the Menominee River, also flows mostly southward in Menominee County approximately 10 to 15 miles (16 to 24 km) west of the Cedar River.

== Tributaries and features ==
From the mouth:

- (left) Walton River
  - (right) Westman Lake
  - North Lake
    - Crystal Brook
    - Weary Creek
    - Big Brook
      - (left) Little Lake
        - Hayward Lake
          - Hayward Creek
          - Myers Lake
      - (right) Baird Creek
      - (right) Grant Brook
      - (left) Wagner Lake
- (left) Elwood Creek
  - (left) West Ellwood Creek
  - (right) Mill Creek
  - (right) Dry Creek
- (left) Devils Creek
  - (right) Camp H Creek
  - (left) Crawford Creek
- (right) Brill Brook
- (right) Degraves Creek (also known as Degroves Creek)
- (left) Collard Creek
- (left) Crooked Creek
- (right) Depas Creek
  - (left) Advent Creek
- (left) Mashek Creek
- (left) Brook Creek
  - (right) Knap Creek
    - Kitchners Lake
  - (left) Gordon Creek
- (right) Houle Creek
- (right) Fortyseven Mile Creek
  - (right) Whitney Creek
- (left) Gorginski Creek
- (right) Wilson Creek
  - (right) Arnold Lake
  - (right) Indian Creek
    - Indian Lake
    - Little Indian Lake
- (left) Reed Brook
  - Reed Lake
- (left) Alder Brook
  - Wheeler Lake
- (left) West Branch Cedar River
  - (left) Beaver Dam Creek
  - (left) Menard Creek
  - (left) Lake Number Eighteen
  - (left) Vega Creek
  - (right) Spruce Creek
    - Spruce Lake
- (left) Pittsburg Creek
- (left) Labre Creek
- (left) Nacomis Creek

== Drainage basin ==
The Cedar River drains all or portions of the following:

- Delta County
  - Bark River Township
- Menominee County
  - Cedarville Township
  - Daggett Township
  - Gourley Township
  - Harris Township
  - Ingallston Township
  - Meyer Township
  - Nadeau Township
  - Village of Powers
  - Spalding Township
  - Stephenson Township
