= Lake Township, Menominee County, Michigan =

Lake Township, Michigan
- Civil township
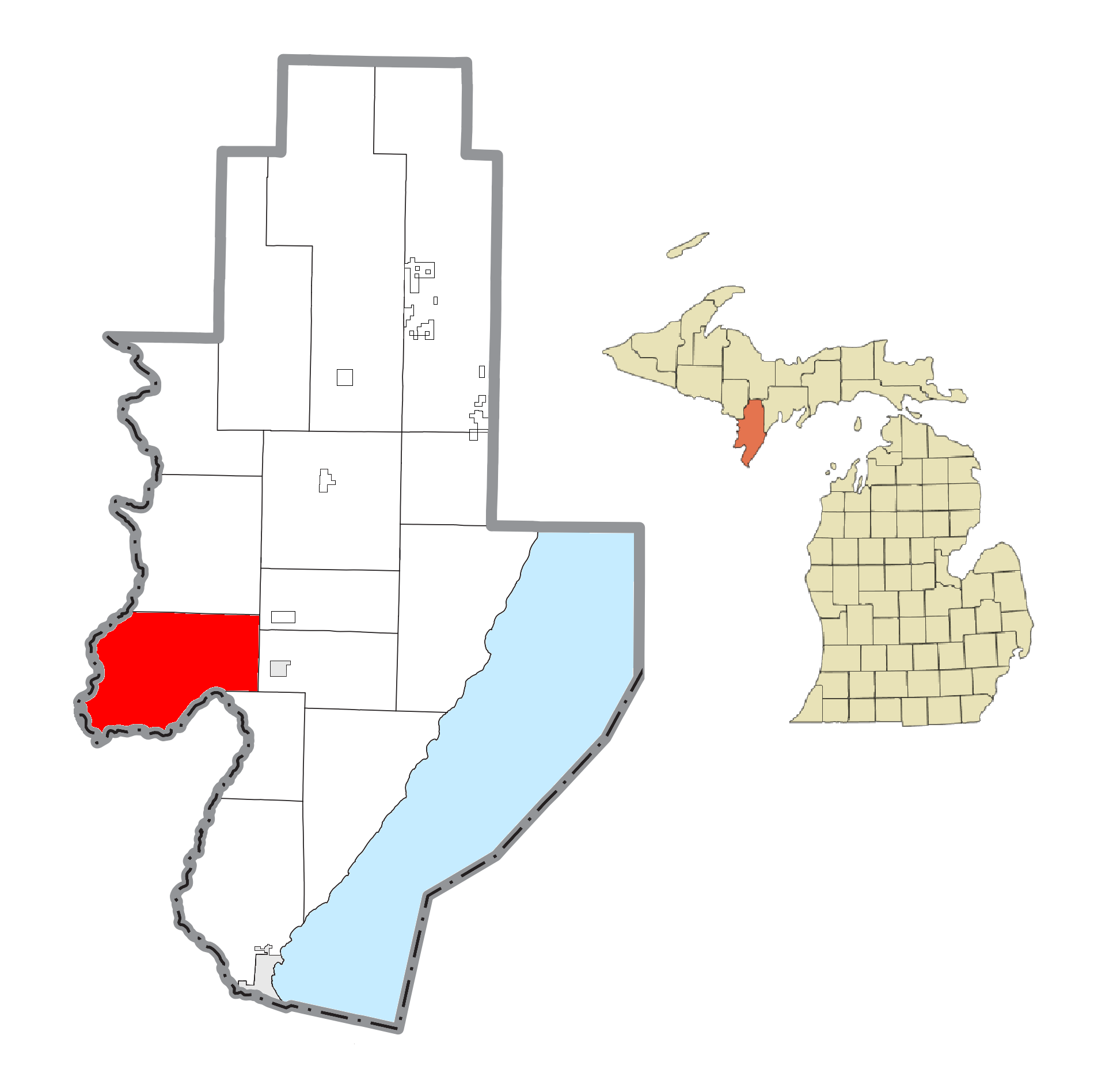
- Location within Menominee County and the state of Michigan

- Location within Michigan Location within the United States
- Coordinates: 45°25′24″N 87°45′43″W
- Country: United States
- State: Michigan
- County: Menominee

Area
  - Total: 72.7 sq mi (188 km^{2})
  - Land: 70.7 sq mi (183 km^{2})
  - Water: 2.0 sq mi (5.2 km^{2})
- Elevation: 705 ft (215 m)

Population (2020)
  - Total: 501
  - Density: 7.1/sq mi (2.7/km^{2})
- Time zone: UTC-6 (Central (CST))
  - Summer (DST): UTC-5 (CDT)
- ZIP Codes: 49887 (Stephenson); 49821 (Daggett)
- Area code: 906
- FIPS code: 26-109-44360
- GNIS feature ID: 1626576

Lake Township is a civil township of Menominee County in the U.S. state of Michigan. The population was 501 at the 2020 census, down from 556 in 2010.

== Geography ==
The township is on the western edge of Menominee County, bordered to the west and south, across the Menominee River, by Marinette County, Wisconsin. The eastern border of the township is 2 miles (3 km) west of the village of Stephenson.

According to the United States Census Bureau, the township has a total area of 72.7 square miles (188 km^{2}), of which 70.7 square miles (183 km^{2}) are land and 2.0 square miles (5.2 km^{2}), or 2.74%, are water. Shakey Lakes County Park is in the western part of the township, among a chain of lakes formed by an impoundment on the Shakey River.

== Demographics ==
As of the census of 2000, there were 576 people, 244 households, and 164 families residing in the township. By 2020, there were 501 people in the township.
