= Stephenson Township, Michigan =

- Civil township
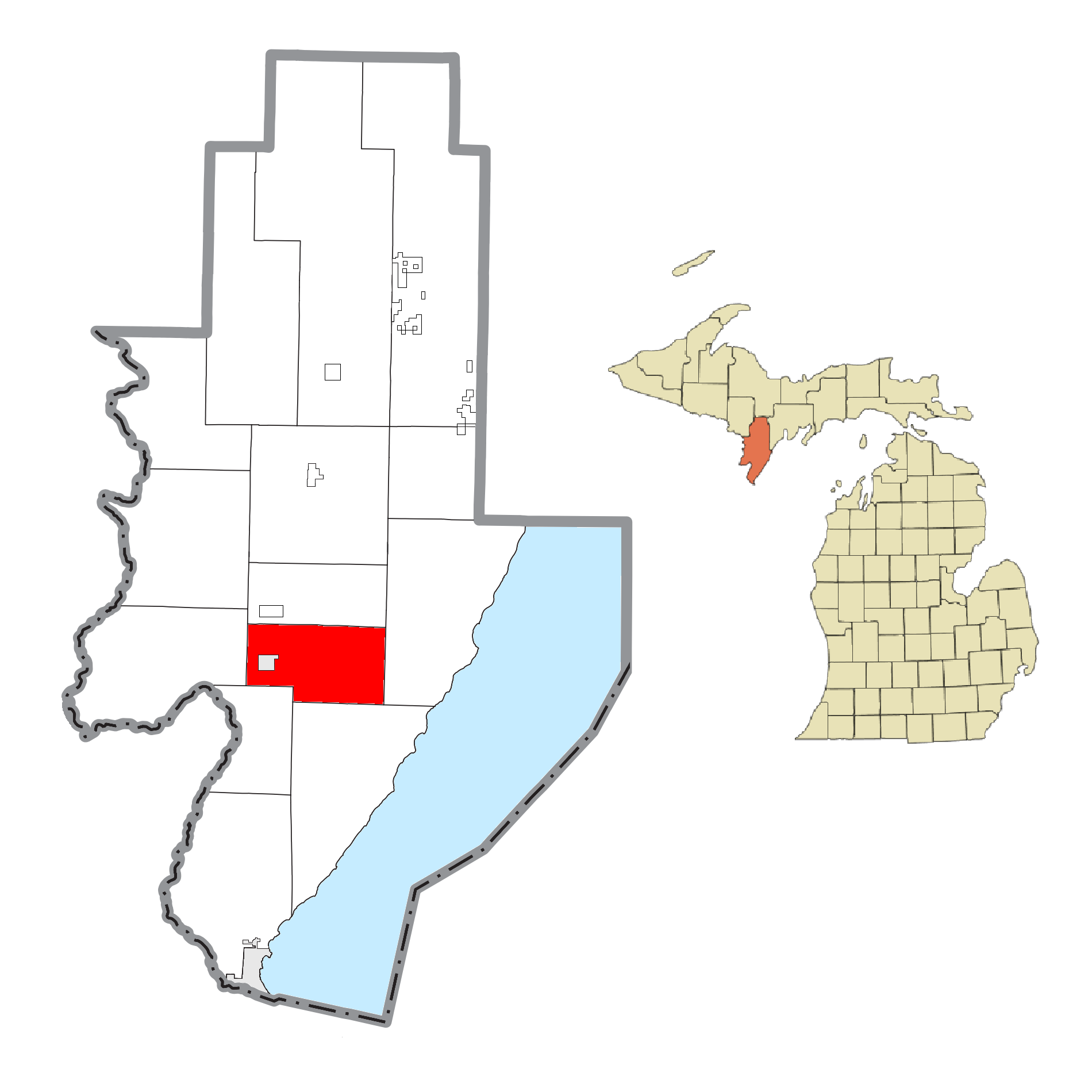
- Location within Menominee County and the state of Michigan

- Location within Michigan Location within the United States
- Coordinates: 45°24′59″N 87°32′49″W
- Country: United States
- State: Michigan
- County: Menominee

Area
  - Total: 41.2 sq mi (107 km^{2})
  - Land: 40.7 sq mi (105 km^{2})
  - Water: 0.5 sq mi (1.3 km^{2})
- Elevation: 699 ft (213 m)

Population (2020)
  - Total: 616
  - Density: 15.1/sq mi (5.8/km^{2})
- Time zone: UTC-6 (Central (CST))
  - Summer (DST): UTC-5 (CDT)
- ZIP Code: 49887 (Stephenson); 49821 (Daggett)
- Area code: 906
- FIPS code: 26-109-76400
- GNIS feature ID: 1627125

Stephenson Township is a civil township of Menominee County in the U.S. state of Michigan. The population was 616 at the 2020 census. The city of Stephenson is surrounded by the township but is administered autonomously.

== Geography ==
The township is south of the center of Menominee County. The city of Stephenson is surrounded by the western part of the township. U.S. Route 41 passes through the township and city, leading south 21 miles (34 km) to Menominee, the county seat, and north 20 miles (32 km) to Powers.

According to the U.S. Census Bureau, Stephenson Township has a total area of 41.2 square miles (107 km^{2}), of which 40.7 square miles (105 km^{2}) are land and 0.5 square miles (1.3 km^{2}), or 1.13%, are water. The Little Cedar River, a south-flowing tributary of the Menominee River, drains the western part of the township, while the Walton River drains the eastern part, starting at North Lake.

== Communities ==
- Daggett was a community founded in 1876. It was incorporated as a village in 1902 and is now within Daggett Township to the north.

== Demographics ==
Historical population
Census	Pop.	Note	%±
1880	1,222		—
1890	2,279		86.5%
1900	3,006		31.9%
1910	2,913		−3.1%
1920	2,828		−2.9%
1930	1,409		−50.2%
1940	1,543		9.5%
1950	1,675		8.6%
1960	1,646		−1.7%
1970	1,507		−8.4%
1980	733		−51.4%
1990	695		−5.2%
2000	716		3.0%
2010	670		−6.4%
2020	616		−8.1%
U.S. Decennial Census

As of the census of 2000, there were 716 people, 283 households, and 215 families residing in the township. By 2020, its population was 616.
