= Wandelt =

Wandelt is a surname. Notable people with the surname include:

- Benjamin D. Wandelt (fl. 2015), theoretical astrophysicist and cosmologist
- Mabel Wandelt (1917–2008), American nurse
