= Ingallston Township, Michigan =

- Civil township
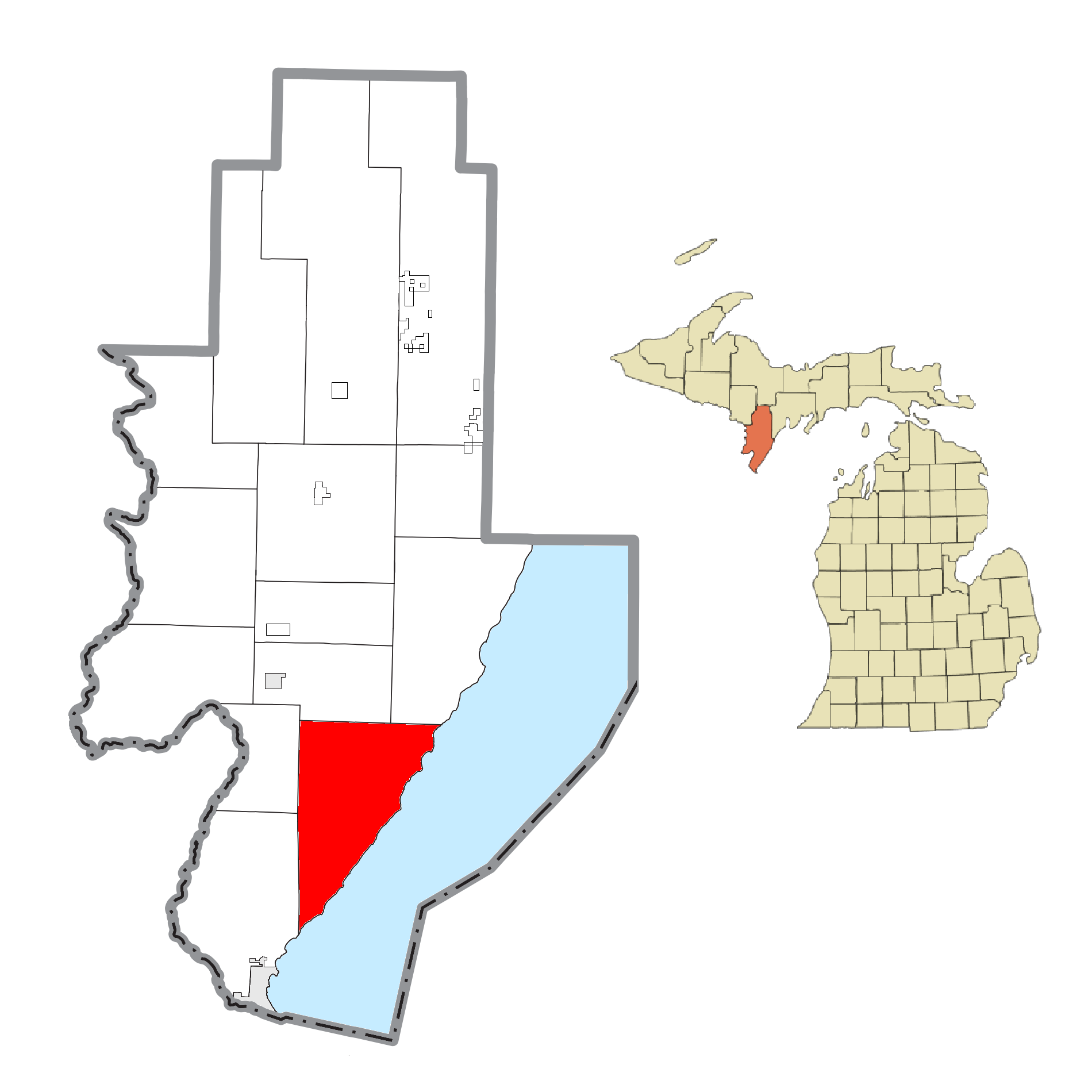
- Location within Menominee County and the state of Michigan

- Location within Michigan Location within the United States
- Coordinates: 45°17′30″N 87°27′54″W
- Country: United States
- State: Michigan
- County: Menominee

Area
  - Total: 71.7 sq mi (186 km^{2})
  - Land: 70.9 sq mi (184 km^{2})
  - Water: 0.8 sq mi (2.1 km^{2})
- Elevation: 679 ft (207 m)

Population (2020)
  - Total: 924
  - Density: 13/sq mi (5.0/km^{2})
- Time zone: UTC-6 (Central (CST))
  - Summer (DST): UTC-5 (CDT)
- ZIP Codes: 49858 (Menominee); 49893 (Wallace); 49887 (Stephenson)
- Area code: 906
- FIPS code: 26-109-40600
- GNIS feature ID: 1626513
- Website: https://www.ingallstonmi.gov/

Ingallston Township is a civil township of Menominee County in the U.S. state of Michigan. The population was 924 at the 2020 census.

== Geography ==
The township is in southern Menominee County, bordered to the southeast by Lake Michigan's Green Bay. State highway M-35 crosses the township from northeast to southwest, following the lakeshore; the highway least southwest 14 miles (23 km) to Menominee, the county seat, and northeast 40 miles (64 km) to Escanaba.

According to the U.S. Census Bureau, the township has a total area of 71.7 square miles (186 km^{2}), of which 70.9 square miles (184 km^{2}) are land and 0.8 square miles (2.1 km^{2}), or 1.15%, are water. Hayward Lake is in the northern part of the township. The former community of Greenwoods is located in Ingallston Township, northeast of Carbondale.

== Demographics ==
As of the census of 2000, there were 1,042 people, 456 households, and 316 families residing in the township. By 2020, there were 924 people in the township.
