= Wisconsin statistical areas =

Coordinates: 44.6243°N 89.9941°W

The U.S. State of Wisconsin currently has 40 statistical areas that have been delineated by the Office of Management and Budget (OMB). On July 21, 2023, the OMB delineated 11 combined statistical areas, 15 metropolitan statistical areas, and 14 micropolitan statistical areas in Wisconsin. As of 2025, the largest of these is the Milwaukee–Racine–Waukesha, WI CSA, comprising the area around Wisconsin's largest city, Milwaukee.

== Statistical areas ==
The Office of Management and Budget (OMB) has designated more than 1,000 statistical areas for the United States and Puerto Rico. These statistical areas are important geographic delineations of population clusters used by the OMB, the United States Census Bureau, planning organizations, and federal, state, and local government entities.

The OMB defines a core-based statistical area (CBSA) as the county or counties (or county-equivalents) surrounding at least one densely-settled core of at least 10,000 population, "plus adjacent counties having a high degree of social and economic integration with the core as measured through commuting ties with the counties containing the core". The OMB further divides a CBSA based on population into a metropolitan statistical area (MSA) for those with at least 50,000 people or a micropolitan statistical area (μSA) for those with 10,000 to 49,999 people.

The OMB defines a combined statistical area (CSA) as two or more adjacent CBSAs where the employment interchange rate (percent commuting from A to B plus percent commuting from B to A) is at least 15%. A primary statistical area (PSA) includes all CSAs and any CBSA that is not a constituent of a combined statistical area.

The 40 United States statistical areas and 72 counties of the State of Wisconsin (Note: An out-of-state area and its population are displayed in green. An area that extends into more than one state is displayed in purple. A purple population number over a black population number show the total population versus the in-state population. The state's abbreviation is also shown next to the in-state total.)
| Combined statistical area | 2025 population (est.) | Core-based statistical area | 2025 population (est.) | County | 2025 population (est.) | Metropolitan division | 2025 population (est.) |
|---|---|---|---|---|---|---|---|
| Milwaukee–Racine–Waukesha, WI CSA | 2,055,558 | Milwaukee–Waukesha, WI MSA | 1,575,010 | Milwaukee County, Wisconsin | 924,216 | none | |
| Milwaukee–Racine–Waukesha, WI CSA | 2,055,558 | Milwaukee–Waukesha, WI MSA | 1,575,010 | Waukesha County, Wisconsin | 417,210 | none | |
| Milwaukee–Racine–Waukesha, WI CSA | 2,055,558 | Milwaukee–Waukesha, WI MSA | 1,575,010 | Washington County, Wisconsin | 139,238 | none | |
| Milwaukee–Racine–Waukesha, WI CSA | 2,055,558 | Milwaukee–Waukesha, WI MSA | 1,575,010 | Ozaukee County, Wisconsin | 94,346 | none | |
| Milwaukee–Racine–Waukesha, WI CSA | 2,055,558 | Racine–Mount Pleasant, WI MSA | 198,919 | Racine County, Wisconsin | 198,919 | none | |
| Milwaukee–Racine–Waukesha, WI CSA | 2,055,558 | Whitewater–Elkhorn, WI μSA | 106,027 | Walworth County, Wisconsin | 106,127 | none | |
| Milwaukee–Racine–Waukesha, WI CSA | 2,055,558 | Beaver Dam, WI μSA | 89,097 | Dodge County, Wisconsin | 89,097 | none | |
| Milwaukee–Racine–Waukesha, WI CSA | 2,055,558 | Watertown–Fort Atkinson, WI μSA | 86,505 | Jefferson County, Wisconsin | 86,505 | none | |
| Madison–Janesville–Beloit, WI CSA | 942,809 | Madison, WI MSA | 709,685 | Dane County, Wisconsin | 590,375 | none | |
| Madison–Janesville–Beloit, WI CSA | 942,809 | Madison, WI MSA | 709,685 | Columbia County, Wisconsin | 58,132 | none | |
| Madison–Janesville–Beloit, WI CSA | 942,809 | Madison, WI MSA | 709,685 | Green County, Wisconsin | 37,227 | none | |
| Madison–Janesville–Beloit, WI CSA | 942,809 | Madison, WI MSA | 709,685 | Iowa County, Wisconsin | 23,951 | none | |
| Madison–Janesville–Beloit, WI CSA | 942,809 | Janesville–Beloit, WI MSA | 166,472 | Rock County, Wisconsin | 166,472 | none | |
| Madison–Janesville–Beloit, WI CSA | 942,809 | Baraboo, WI μSA | 66,652 | Sauk County, Wisconsin | 66,652 | none | |
| Appleton–Oshkosh–Neenah, WI CSA | 424,094 | Appleton, WI MSA | 249,876 | Outagamie County, Wisconsin | 195,894 | none | |
| Appleton–Oshkosh–Neenah, WI CSA | 424,094 | Appleton, WI MSA | 249,876 | Calumet County, Wisconsin | 53,982 | none | |
| Appleton–Oshkosh–Neenah, WI CSA | 424,094 | Oshkosh–Neenah, WI MSA | 174,218 | Winnebago County, Wisconsin | 174,218 | none | |
| Green Bay–Shawano, WI CSA | 382,515 | Green Bay, WI MSA | 336,756 | Brown County, Wisconsin | 275,803 | none | |
| Green Bay–Shawano, WI CSA | 382,515 | Green Bay, WI MSA | 336,756 | Oconto County, Wisconsin | 40,195 | none | |
| Green Bay–Shawano, WI CSA | 382,515 | Green Bay, WI MSA | 336,756 | Kewaunee County, Wisconsin | 20,758 | none | |
| Green Bay–Shawano, WI CSA | 382,515 | Shawano, WI μSA | 45,759 | Shawano County, Wisconsin | 41,560 | none | |
| Green Bay–Shawano, WI CSA | 382,515 | Shawano, WI μSA | 45,759 | Menominee County, Wisconsin | 4,199 | none | |
| Wausau–Stevens Point–Wisconsin Rapids, WI CSA | 285,435 | Wausau, WI MSA | 139,432 | Marathon County, Wisconsin | 139,432 | none | |
| Wausau–Stevens Point–Wisconsin Rapids, WI CSA | 285,435 | Wisconsin Rapids–Marshfield, WI μSA | 74,060 | Wood County, Wisconsin | 74,060 | none | |
| Wausau–Stevens Point–Wisconsin Rapids, WI CSA | 285,435 | Stevens Point–Plover, WI μSA | 71,943 | Portage County, Wisconsin | 71,943 | none | |
| Eau Claire–Menomonie, WI CSA | 222,870 | Eau Claire, WI MSA | 176,647 | Eau Claire County, Wisconsin | 109,033 | none | |
| Eau Claire–Menomonie, WI CSA | 222,870 | Eau Claire, WI MSA | 176,647 | Chippewa County, Wisconsin | 67,614 | none | |
| Eau Claire–Menomonie, WI CSA | 222,870 | Menomonie, WI μSA | 46,223 | Dunn County, Wisconsin | 46,223 | none | |
| La Crosse–Onalaska–Sparta, WI-MN MSA | 217,754; 199,354 (WI) | La Crosse–Onlaska, WI-MN MSA | 171,182; 152,782 (WI) | La Crosse County, Wisconsin | 121,339 | none | |
| La Crosse–Onalaska–Sparta, WI-MN MSA | 217,754; 199,354 (WI) | La Crosse–Onlaska, WI-MN MSA | 171,182; 152,782 (WI) | Vernon County, Wisconsin | 31,443 | none | |
| La Crosse–Onalaska–Sparta, WI-MN MSA | 217,754; 199,354 (WI) | La Crosse–Onlaska, WI-MN MSA | 171,182; 152,782 (WI) | Houston County, Minnesota | 18,400 | none | |
| La Crosse–Onalaska–Sparta, WI-MN MSA | 217,754; 199,354 (WI) | Sparta, WI μSA | 46,572 | Monroe County, Wisconsin | 46,572 | none | |
| Chicago–Naperville, IL-IN-WI CSA | 9,965,292; 168,448 (WI) | Chicago–Naperville–Elgin, IL-IN MSA | 9,434,123 | Cook County, Illinois | 5,194,625 | Chicago-Naperville-Schaumburg, IL MD | 7,212,979 |
| Chicago–Naperville, IL-IN-WI CSA | 9,965,292; 168,448 (WI) | Chicago–Naperville–Elgin, IL-IN MSA | 9,434,123 | DuPage County, Illinois | 934,298 | Chicago-Naperville-Schaumburg, IL MD | 7,212,979 |
| Chicago–Naperville, IL-IN-WI CSA | 9,965,292; 168,448 (WI) | Chicago–Naperville–Elgin, IL-IN MSA | 9,434,123 | Will County, Illinois | 712,253 | Chicago-Naperville-Schaumburg, IL MD | 7,212,979 |
| Chicago–Naperville, IL-IN-WI CSA | 9,965,292; 168,448 (WI) | Chicago–Naperville–Elgin, IL-IN MSA | 9,434,123 | McHenry County, Illinois | 317,751 | Chicago-Naperville-Schaumburg, IL MD | 7,212,979 |
| Chicago–Naperville, IL-IN-WI CSA | 9,965,292; 168,448 (WI) | Chicago–Naperville–Elgin, IL-IN MSA | 9,434,123 | Grundy County, Illinois | 54,052 | Chicago-Naperville-Schaumburg, IL MD | 7,212,979 |
| Chicago–Naperville, IL-IN-WI CSA | 9,965,292; 168,448 (WI) | Chicago–Naperville–Elgin, IL-IN MSA | 9,434,123 | Kane County, Illinois | 525,757 | Elgin, IL MD | 773,062 |
| Chicago–Naperville, IL-IN-WI CSA | 9,965,292; 168,448 (WI) | Chicago–Naperville–Elgin, IL-IN MSA | 9,434,123 | Kendall County, Illinois | 145,470 | Elgin, IL MD | 773,062 |
| Chicago–Naperville, IL-IN-WI CSA | 9,965,292; 168,448 (WI) | Chicago–Naperville–Elgin, IL-IN MSA | 9,434,123 | DeKalb County, Illinois | 101,835 | Elgin, IL MD | 773,062 |
| Chicago–Naperville, IL-IN-WI CSA | 9,965,292; 168,448 (WI) | Chicago–Naperville–Elgin, IL-IN MSA | 9,434,123 | Lake County, Indiana | 504,612 | Lake County-Porter County-Jasper County, IN MD | 728,743 |
| Chicago–Naperville, IL-IN-WI CSA | 9,965,292; 168,448 (WI) | Chicago–Naperville–Elgin, IL-IN MSA | 9,434,123 | Porter County, Indiana | 176,049 | Lake County-Porter County-Jasper County, IN MD | 728,743 |
| Chicago–Naperville, IL-IN-WI CSA | 9,965,292; 168,448 (WI) | Chicago–Naperville–Elgin, IL-IN MSA | 9,434,123 | Jasper County, Indiana | 33,894 | Lake County-Porter County-Jasper County, IN MD | 728,743 |
| Chicago–Naperville, IL-IN-WI CSA | 9,965,292; 168,448 (WI) | Chicago–Naperville–Elgin, IL-IN MSA | 9,434,123 | Newton County, Indiana | 14,188 | Lake County-Porter County-Jasper County, IN MD | 728,743 |
| Chicago–Naperville, IL-IN-WI CSA | 9,965,292; 168,448 (WI) | Chicago–Naperville–Elgin, IL-IN MSA | 9,434,123 | Lake County, Illinois | 719,339 | Lake County, IL MD | 719,339 |
| Chicago–Naperville, IL-IN-WI CSA | 9,965,292; 168,448 (WI) | Kenosha, WI MSA | 168,448 | Kenosha County, Wisconsin | 168,448 | none | |
| Chicago–Naperville, IL-IN-WI CSA | 9,965,292; 168,448 (WI) | Ottawa, IL μSA | 145,902 | LaSalle County, Illinois | 107,773 | none | |
| Chicago–Naperville, IL-IN-WI CSA | 9,965,292; 168,448 (WI) | Ottawa, IL μSA | 145,902 | Bureau County, Illinois | 32,510 | none | |
| Chicago–Naperville, IL-IN-WI CSA | 9,965,292; 168,448 (WI) | Ottawa, IL μSA | 145,902 | Putnam County, Illinois | 5,619 | none | |
| Chicago–Naperville, IL-IN-WI CSA | 9,965,292; 168,448 (WI) | Michigan City–La Porte, IN MSA | 111,294 | LaPorte County, Indiana | 111,294 | none | |
| Chicago–Naperville, IL-IN-WI CSA | 9,965,292; 168,448 (WI) | Kankakee, IL MSA | 105,525 | Kankakee County, Illinois | 105,525 | none | |
| Minneapolis–St. Paul, MN-WI CSA | 4,188,378; 141,795 (WI) | Minneapolis–St. Paul–Bloomington, MN-WI MSA | 3,790,295; 141,795 (WI) | Hennepin County, Minnesota | 1,284,784 | none | |
| Minneapolis–St. Paul, MN-WI CSA | 4,188,378; 141,795 (WI) | Minneapolis–St. Paul–Bloomington, MN-WI MSA | 3,790,295; 141,795 (WI) | Ramsey County, Minnesota | 541,623 | none | |
| Minneapolis–St. Paul, MN-WI CSA | 4,188,378; 141,795 (WI) | Minneapolis–St. Paul–Bloomington, MN-WI MSA | 3,790,295; 141,795 (WI) | Dakota County, Minnesota | 457,710 | none | |
| Minneapolis–St. Paul, MN-WI CSA | 4,188,378; 141,795 (WI) | Minneapolis–St. Paul–Bloomington, MN-WI MSA | 3,790,295; 141,795 (WI) | Anoka County, Minnesota | 381,605 | none | |
| Minneapolis–St. Paul, MN-WI CSA | 4,188,378; 141,795 (WI) | Minneapolis–St. Paul–Bloomington, MN-WI MSA | 3,790,295; 141,795 (WI) | Washington County, Minnesota | 286,895 | none | |
| Minneapolis–St. Paul, MN-WI CSA | 4,188,378; 141,795 (WI) | Minneapolis–St. Paul–Bloomington, MN-WI MSA | 3,790,295; 141,795 (WI) | Scott County, Minnesota | 159,017 | none | |
| Minneapolis–St. Paul, MN-WI CSA | 4,188,378; 141,795 (WI) | Minneapolis–St. Paul–Bloomington, MN-WI MSA | 3,790,295; 141,795 (WI) | Wright County, Minnesota | 157,559 | none | |
| Minneapolis–St. Paul, MN-WI CSA | 4,188,378; 141,795 (WI) | Minneapolis–St. Paul–Bloomington, MN-WI MSA | 3,790,295; 141,795 (WI) | Carver County, Minnesota | 114,379 | none | |
| Minneapolis–St. Paul, MN-WI CSA | 4,188,378; 141,795 (WI) | Minneapolis–St. Paul–Bloomington, MN-WI MSA | 3,790,295; 141,795 (WI) | Sherburne County, Minnesota | 104,194 | none | |
| Minneapolis–St. Paul, MN-WI CSA | 4,188,378; 141,795 (WI) | Minneapolis–St. Paul–Bloomington, MN-WI MSA | 3,790,295; 141,795 (WI) | St. Croix County, Wisconsin | 98,276 | none | |
| Minneapolis–St. Paul, MN-WI CSA | 4,188,378; 141,795 (WI) | Minneapolis–St. Paul–Bloomington, MN-WI MSA | 3,790,295; 141,795 (WI) | Chisago County, Minnesota | 59,142 | none | |
| Minneapolis–St. Paul, MN-WI CSA | 4,188,378; 141,795 (WI) | Minneapolis–St. Paul–Bloomington, MN-WI MSA | 3,790,295; 141,795 (WI) | Isanti County, Minnesota | 44,386 | none | |
| Minneapolis–St. Paul, MN-WI CSA | 4,188,378; 141,795 (WI) | Minneapolis–St. Paul–Bloomington, MN-WI MSA | 3,790,295; 141,795 (WI) | Pierce County, Wisconsin | 43,519 | none | |
| Minneapolis–St. Paul, MN-WI CSA | 4,188,378; 141,795 (WI) | Minneapolis–St. Paul–Bloomington, MN-WI MSA | 3,790,295; 141,795 (WI) | Le Sueur County, Minnesota | 29,453 | none | |
| Minneapolis–St. Paul, MN-WI CSA | 4,188,378; 141,795 (WI) | Minneapolis–St. Paul–Bloomington, MN-WI MSA | 3,790,295; 141,795 (WI) | Mille Lacs County, Minnesota | 27,753 | none | |
| Minneapolis–St. Paul, MN-WI CSA | 4,188,378; 141,795 (WI) | St. Cloud, MN MSA | 205,854 | Stearns County, Minnesota | 164,110 | none | |
| Minneapolis–St. Paul, MN-WI CSA | 4,188,378; 141,795 (WI) | St. Cloud, MN MSA | 205,854 | Benton County, Minnesota | 41,744 | none | |
| Minneapolis–St. Paul, MN-WI CSA | 4,188,378; 141,795 (WI) | Faribault–Northfield, MN μSA | 69,939 | Rice County, Minnesota | 69,939 | none | |
| Minneapolis–St. Paul, MN-WI CSA | 4,188,378; 141,795 (WI) | Red Wing, MN μSA | 48,195 | Goodhue County, Minnesota | 48,195 | none | |
| Minneapolis–St. Paul, MN-WI CSA | 4,188,378; 141,795 (WI) | Owatonna, MN μSA | 37,464 | Steele County, Minnesota | 37,464 | none | |
| Minneapolis–St. Paul, MN-WI CSA | 4,188,378; 141,795 (WI) | Hutchinson, MN μSA | 36,631 | McLeod County, Minnesota | 36,631 | none | |
| none | | Sheboygan, WI MSA | 118,047 | Sheboygan County, Wisconsin | 118,047 | none | |
| none | | Fond du Lac, WI MSA | 104,669 | Fond du Lac County, Wisconsin | 104,669 | none | |
| none | | Manitowoc, WI μSA | 81,710 | Manitowoc County, Wisconsin | 81,710 | none | |
| none | | Platteville, WI μSA | 52,446 | Grant County, Wisconsin | 52,446 | none | |
| Marinette–Iron Mountain, WI-MI CSA | 96,090; 47,322 (WI) | Marinette, WI-MI μSA | 65,515; 42,574 (WI) | Marinette County, Wisconsin | 42,574 | none | |
| Marinette–Iron Mountain, WI-MI CSA | 96,090; 47,322 (WI) | Marinette, WI-MI μSA | 65,515; 42,574 (WI) | Menominee County, Michigan | 22,941 | none | |
| Marinette–Iron Mountain, WI-MI CSA | 96,090; 47,322 (WI) | Iron Mountain, MI-WI μSA | 30,575; 4,748 (WI) | Dickinson County, Michigan | 25,827 | none | |
| Marinette–Iron Mountain, WI-MI CSA | 96,090; 47,322 (WI) | Iron Mountain, MI-WI μSA | 30,575; 4,748 (WI) | Florence County, Wisconsin | 4,748 | none | |
| none | | Rice Lake, WI μSA | 46,484 | Barron County, Wisconsin | 46,484 | none | |
| Duluth–Grand Rapids, MN-WI CSA | 326,623; 43,990 (WI) | Duluth, MN-WI MSA | 281,219; 43,990 (WI) | St. Louis County, Minnesota | 200,518 | none | |
| Duluth–Grand Rapids, MN-WI CSA | 326,623; 43,990 (WI) | Duluth, MN-WI MSA | 281,219; 43,990 (WI) | Douglas County, Wisconsin | 43,990 | none | |
| Duluth–Grand Rapids, MN-WI CSA | 326,623; 43,990 (WI) | Duluth, MN-WI MSA | 281,219; 43,990 (WI) | Carlton County, Minnesota | 36,711 | none | |
| Duluth–Grand Rapids, MN-WI CSA | 326,623; 43,990 (WI) | Grand Rapids, MN μSA | 45,404 | Itasca County, Minnesota | 45,404 | none | |
| none | | | | Waupaca County, Wisconsin | 51,461 | none | |
| none | | | | Polk County, Wisconsin | 45,803 | none | |
| none | | | | Oneida County, Wisconsin | 38,131 | none | |
| none | | | | Clark County, Wisconsin | 35,052 | none | |
| none | | | | Trempealeau County, Wisconsin | 31,171 | none | |
| none | | | | Door County, Wisconsin | 30,616 | none | |
| none | | | | Lincoln County, Wisconsin | 28,403 | none | |
| none | | | | Juneau County, Wisconsin | 26,649 | none | |
| none | | | | Waushara County, Wisconsin | 25,223 | none | |
| none | | | | Vilas County, Wisconsin | 23,761 | none | |
| none | | | | Adams County, Wisconsin | 21,752 | none | |
| none | | | | Jackson County, Wisconsin | 20,999 | none | |
| none | | | | Taylor County, Wisconsin | 20,118 | none | |
| none | | | | Langlade County, Wisconsin | 19,534 | none | |
| none | | | | Green Lake County, Wisconsin | 19,305 | none | |
| none | | | | Sawyer County, Wisconsin | 18,846 | none | |
| none | | | | Lafayette County, Wisconsin | 17,478 | none | |
| none | | | | Burnett County, Wisconsin | 17,223 | none | |
| none | | | | Washburn County, Wisconsin | 17,087 | none | |
| none | | | | Richland County, Wisconsin | 17,036 | none | |
| none | | | | Bayfield County, Wisconsin | 16,787 | none | |
| none | | | | Ashland County, Wisconsin | 16,203 | none | |
| none | | | | Marquette County, Wisconsin | 15,927 | none | |
| none | | | | Crawford County, Wisconsin | 15,910 | none | |
| none | | | | Rusk County, Wisconsin | 14,146 | none | |
| none | | | | Price County, Wisconsin | 13,988 | none | |
| none | | | | Buffalo County, Wisconsin | 13,318 | none | |
| none | | | | Forest County, Wisconsin | 9,574 | none | |
| none | | | | Pepin County, Wisconsin | 7,513 | none | |
| none | | | | Iron County, Wisconsin | 6,127 | none | |
| State of Wisconsin | | | | | 5,972,787 | none | |

The 29 core-based statistical areas of the State of Wisconsin (Note: For CBSAs comprising populations from multiple states, they are listed twice to show both their intrastate population within that CBSA as well as the CBSA's total population. Only the intrastate population is ranked.)
| 2025 rank | Core-based statistical area | Population | | | | |
| 2025 rank | Core-based statistical area | 2025 estimate | Change | 2020 Census | Change | 2010 Census |
|---|---|---|---|---|---|---|
| 1 | Milwaukee–Waukesha, WI MSA | 1,575,010 | +0.02% | 1,574,731 | +1.21% | 1,555,908 |
| 2 | Madison, WI MSA | 709,685 | +4.24% | 680,796 | +12.45% | 605,435 |
| 3 | Green Bay, WI MSA | 336,756 | +2.59% | 328,268 | +7.19% | 306,241 |
| 4 | Appleton, WI MSA | 249,876 | +2.77% | 243,147 | +7.75% | 225,666 |
| 5 | Racine–Mount Pleasant, WI MSA | 198,919 | +0.60% | 197,727 | +1.19% | 195,408 |
| 6 | Eau Claire, WI MSA | 176,647 | +2.70% | 172,007 | +6.74% | 161,151 |
| 7 | Oshkosh–Neenah, WI MSA | 174,218 | +1.45% | 171,730 | +2.84% | 166,994 |
| 8 | Kenosha, WI MSA | 168,448 | −0.42% | 169,151 | +1.64% | 166,426 |
| 9 | Janesville-Beloit, WI MSA | 166,472 | +1.70% | 163,687 | +2.09% | 160,331 |
| 10 | La Crosse–Onalaska, WI-MN MSA (WI) | 152,782 | +0.85% | 151,498 | +4.91% | 144,411 |
| 11 | Minneapolis–St. Paul–Bloomington, MN-WI MSA (WI) | 141,795 | +4.45% | 135,748 | +8.28% | 125,364 |
| 12 | Wausau, WI MSA | 139,432 | +1.03% | 138,013 | +2.95% | 134,063 |
| 13 | Sheboygan, WI MSA | 118,047 | +0.01% | 118,034 | +2.19% | 115,507 |
| 14 | Whitewater–Elkhorn, WI μSA | 106,027 | −0.42% | 106,478 | +4.16% | 102,228 |
| 15 | Fond du Lac, WI MSA | 104,669 | +0.49% | 104,154 | +2.48% | 101,633 |
| 16 | Beaver Dam, WI μSA | 89,097 | −0.33% | 89,396 | +0.72% | 88,759 |
| 17 | Watertown–Fort Atkinson, WI μSA | 86,505 | +1.89% | 84,900 | +1.45% | 83,686 |
| 18 | Manitowoc, WI μSA | 81,710 | +0.43% | 81,359 | −0.10% | 81,442 |
| 19 | Wisconsin Rapids–Marshfield, WI μSA | 74,060 | −0.20% | 74,207 | −0.73% | 74,749 |
| 20 | Stevens Point–Plover, WI μSA | 71,943 | +2.23% | 70,377 | +0.51% | 70,019 |
| 21 | Baraboo, WI μSA | 66,652 | +1.35% | 65,763 | +6.11% | 61,976 |
| 22 | Platteville, WI μSA | 52,446 | +0.98% | 51,938 | +1.43% | 51,208 |
| 23 | Sparta, WI μSA | 46,572 | +0.64% | 46,274 | +3.58% | 44,673 |
| 24 | Rice Lake, WI μSA | 46,484 | −0.49% | 46,711 | +1.83% | 45,870 |
| 25 | Menomonie, WI μSA | 46,223 | +1.72% | 45,440 | +3.61% | 43,857 |
| 26 | Shawano, WI μSA | 45,759 | +1.38% | 45,136 | −2.26% | 46,181 |
| 27 | Duluth, MN-WI MSA (WI) | 43,990 | −0.69% | 44,295 | +0.31% | 44,159 |
| 28 | Marinette, WI-MI μSA (WI) | 42,574 | +1.68% | 41,872 | +0.29% | 41,749 |
| 29 | Iron Mountain, MI-WI μSA (WI) | 4,748 | +4.17% | 4,558 | +3.05% | 4,423 |
| | Duluth, MN-WI MSA | 281,219 | +0.17% | 280,733 | +0.34% | 279,771 |
| | Iron Mountain, MI-WI μSA | 30,575 | +0.23% | 30,505 | −0.28% | 30,591 |
| | La Crosse–Onalaska, WI-MN MSA | 171,182 | +0.49% | 170,341 | +4.22% | 163,438 |
| | Marinette, WI-MI μSA | 65,515 | +0.22% | 65,374 | −0.61% | 65,778 |
| | Minneapolis–St. Paul–Bloomington, MN-WI MSA | 3,790,295 | +2.71% | 3,690,261 | +10.70% | 3,333,633 |

The 11 combined statistical areas of the State of Wisconsin (Note: For CSAs comprising populations from multiple states, they are listed twice to show both their intrastate population within that CSA as well as the CSA's total population. Only the intrastate population is ranked.)
| 2025 rank | Combined statistical area | Population | | | | |
| 2025 rank | Combined statistical area | 2025 estimate | Change | 2020 Census | Change | 2010 Census |
|---|---|---|---|---|---|---|
| 1 | Milwaukee–Racine–Waukesha, WI CSA | 2,055,558 | +0.11% | 2,053,232 | +1.34% | 2,025,989 |
| 2 | Madison–Janesville–Beloit, WI CSA | 942,809 | +3.58% | 910,246 | +9.97% | 827,742 |
| 3 | Appleton–Oshkosh–Neenah, WI CSA | 424,094 | +2.22% | 414,877 | +5.66% | 392,660 |
| 4 | Green Bay–Shawano, WI CSA | 382,515 | +2.44% | 373,404 | +5.95% | 352,422 |
| 5 | Wausau–Stevens Point–Wisconsin Rapids, WI CSA | 285,435 | +1.00% | 282,597 | +1.35% | 278,831 |
| 6 | Eau Claire–Menomonie, WI CSA | 222,870 | +2.49% | 217,447 | +6.07% | 205,008 |
| 7 | La Crosse–Onalaska–Sparta, WI-MN CSA (WI) | 199,354 | +0.80% | 197,772 | +4.59% | 189,084 |
| 8 | Chicago–Naperville, IL-IN-WI CSA (WI) | 168,448 | −0.42% | 169,151 | +1.64% | 166,426 |
| 9 | Minneapolis–St. Paul, MN-WI CSA (WI) | 141,795 | +4.45% | 135,748 | +8.28% | 125,364 |
| 10 | Marinette–Iron Mountain, WI-MI CSA (WI) | 47,322 | +1.92% | 46,430 | +0.56% | 46,172 |
| 11 | Duluth–Grand Rapids, MN-WI CSA (WI) | 43,990 | −0.69% | 44,295 | +0.31% | 44,159 |
| | Chicago–Naperville, IL-IN-WI CSA | 9,965,292 | −0.22% | 9,986,960 | +1.48% | 9,840,929 |
| | Duluth–Grand Rapids, MN-WI CSA | 326,623 | +0.27% | 325,747 | +0.28% | 324,829 |
| | La Crosse–Onalaska–Sparta, WI-MN CSA | 217,754 | +0.53% | 216,615 | +4.09% | 208,111 |
| | Marinette–Iron Mountain, WI-MI CSA | 96,090 | +0.22% | 95,879 | −0.51% | 96,369 |
| | Minneapolis–St. Paul, MN-WI CSA | 4,188,378 | +2.69% | 4,078,788 | +10.05% | 3,706,278 |

== See also ==
- Geography of Wisconsin
  - Demographics of Wisconsin
