= Coleman, Wisconsin =

- Village
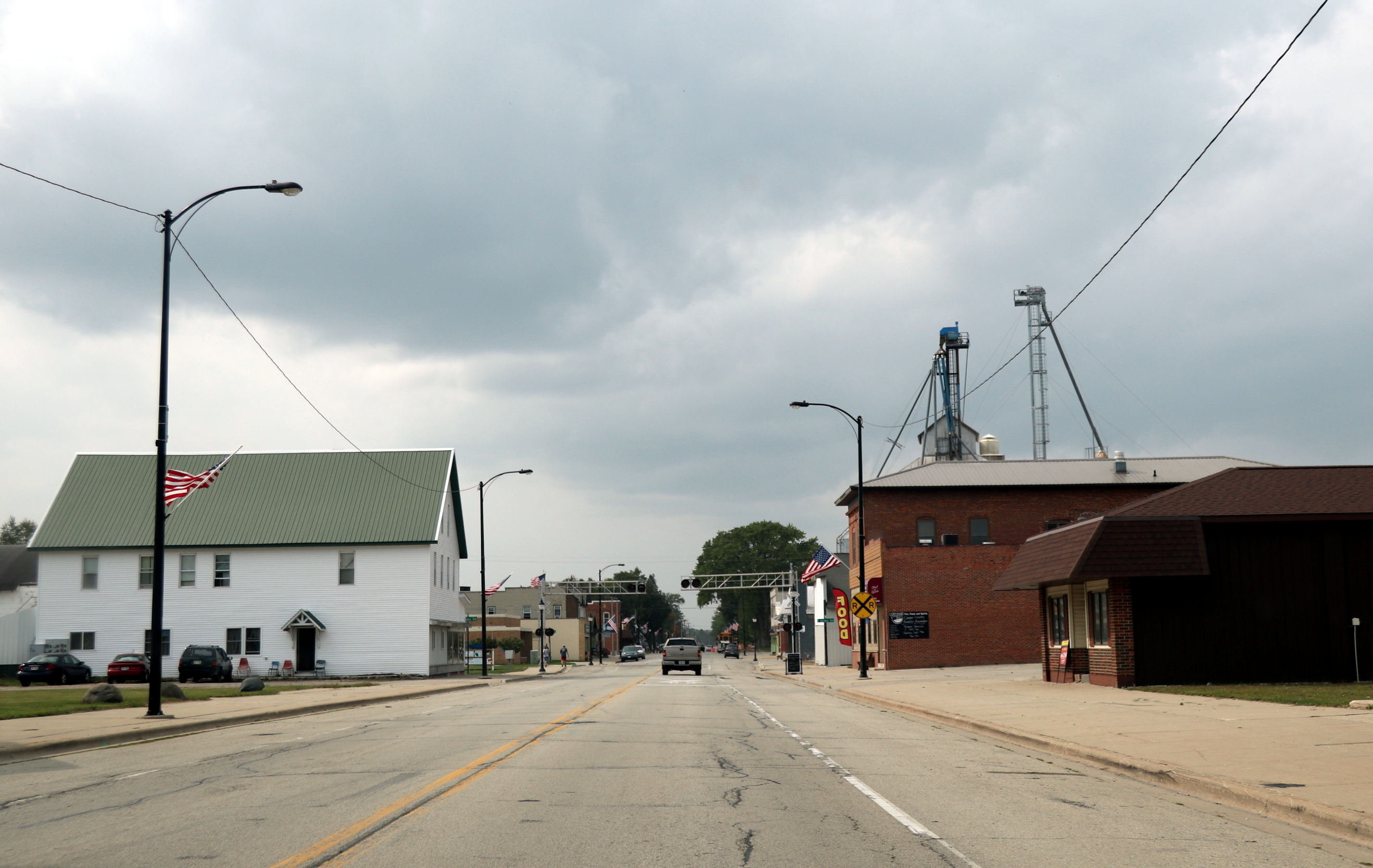
- Downtown Coleman

- Location of Coleman in Marinette County, Wisconsin
- Coordinates: 45°4′11″N 88°2′3″W
- Country: United States
- State: Wisconsin
- County: Marinette

Area
  - Total: 1.36 sq mi (3.53 km^{2})
  - Land: 1.35 sq mi (3.50 km^{2})
  - Water: 0.012 sq mi (0.03 km^{2})
- Elevation: 712 ft (217 m)

Population (2020)
  - Total: 726
  - Density: 537/sq mi (207/km^{2})
- Time zone: UTC-6 (Central (CST))
  - Summer (DST): UTC-5 (CDT)
- Area code: 920
- FIPS code: 55-16250
- GNIS feature ID: 1563252
- Website: http://www.villageofcoleman.com

Coleman is a village in Marinette County, Wisconsin, United States. The population was 726 at the 2020 census. It is part of the Marinette, WI–MI Micropolitan Statistical Area. In 1882, a railroad track was laid between Coleman and Pound, Wisconsin. The tracks were later extended in 1884 to Crivitz, Wisconsin and Marinette, Wisconsin, bringing many more goods and settlers. Logging was the predominant industry in the area from the 1880s and 1910s.

== Geography ==
Coleman is located at 45°4′11″N 88°2′3″W (45.069654, -88.034303).

According to the United States Census Bureau, the village has a total area of 1.17 square miles (3.03 km^{2}), of which 1.16 square miles (3.00 km^{2}) is land and 0.01 square miles (0.03 km^{2}) is water.

== Demographics ==
Historical population
Census	Pop.	Note	%±
1910	436		—
1920	305		−30.0%
1930	407		33.4%
1940	562		38.1%
1950	668		18.9%
1960	718		7.5%
1970	683		−4.9%
1980	852		24.7%
1990	839		−1.5%
2000	716		−14.7%
2010	724		1.1%
2020	726		0.3%
U.S. Decennial Census

=== 2010 census ===
As of the census of 2010, there were 724 people, 315 households, and 197 families living in the village. The population density was 624.1 inhabitants per square mile (241.0/km^{2}). There were 343 housing units at an average density of 295.7 per square mile (114.2/km^{2}). The racial makeup of the village was 95.3% White, 0.6% African American, 1.0% Native American, 1.4% from other races, and 1.8% from two or more races. Hispanic or Latino people of any race were 3.2% of the population.

There were 315 households, of which 26.7% had children under the age of 18 living with them, 46.3% were married couples living together, 9.2% had a female householder with no husband present, 7.0% had a male householder with no wife present, and 37.5% were non-families. 32.1% of all households were made up of individuals, and 13.3% had someone living alone who was 65 years of age or older. The average household size was 2.30 and the average family size was 2.86.

The median age in the village was 38.8 years. 23.6% of residents were under the age of 18; 8.2% were between the ages of 18 and 24; 23% were from 25 to 44; 28.1% were from 45 to 64; and 17% were 65 years of age or older. The gender makeup of the village was 50.6% male and 49.4% female.

=== 2000 census ===
As of the census of 2000, there were 716 people, 316 households, and 199 families living in the village. The population density was 635.7 inhabitants per square mile (245.4/km^{2}). There were 352 housing units at an average density of 312.5 per square mile (120.7/km^{2}). The racial makeup of the village was 99.58% White, 0.14% Pacific Islander, and 0.28% from two or more races. Hispanic or Latino of any race were 0.28% of the population.

There were 316 households, out of which 27.5% had children under the age of 18 living with them, 51.3% were married couples living together, 8.9% had a female householder with no husband present, and 37.0% were non-families. 32.6% of all households were made up of individuals, and 16.1% had someone living alone who was 65 years of age or older. The average household size was 2.26 and the average family size was 2.85.

In the village, the population was spread out, with 23.9% under the age of 18, 6.4% from 18 to 24, 25.8% from 25 to 44, 23.2% from 45 to 64, and 20.7% who were 65 years of age or older. The median age was 42 years. For every 100 females, there were 95.6 males. For every 100 females age 18 and over, there were 88.6 males.

The median income for a household in the village was $35,703, and the median income for a family was $41,500. Males had a median income of $33,594 versus $21,250 for females. The per capita income for the village was $18,248. About 3.7% of families and 7.1% of the population were below the poverty line, including 9.5% of those under age 18 and 7.1% of those age 65 or over.

== Images ==
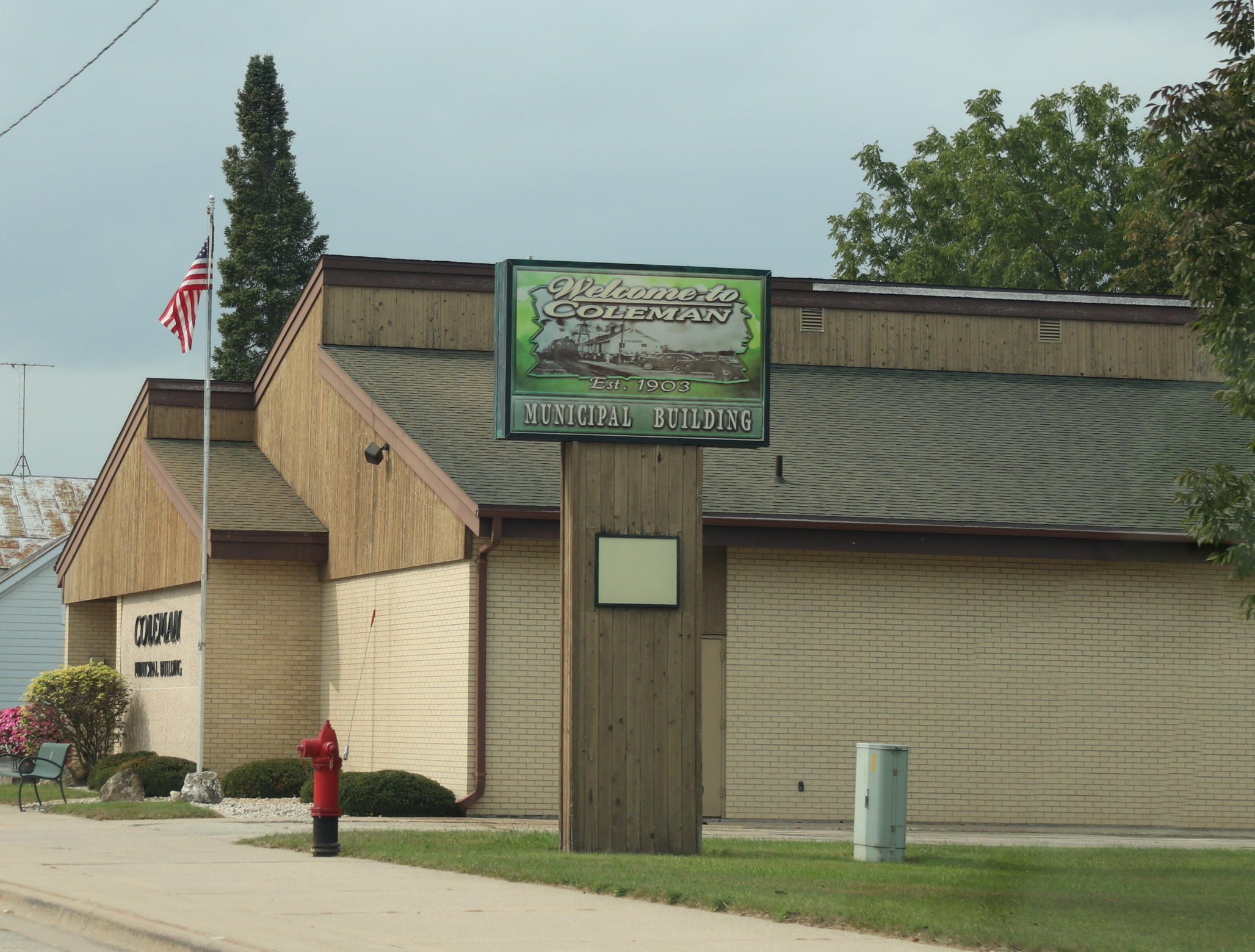
Municipal building

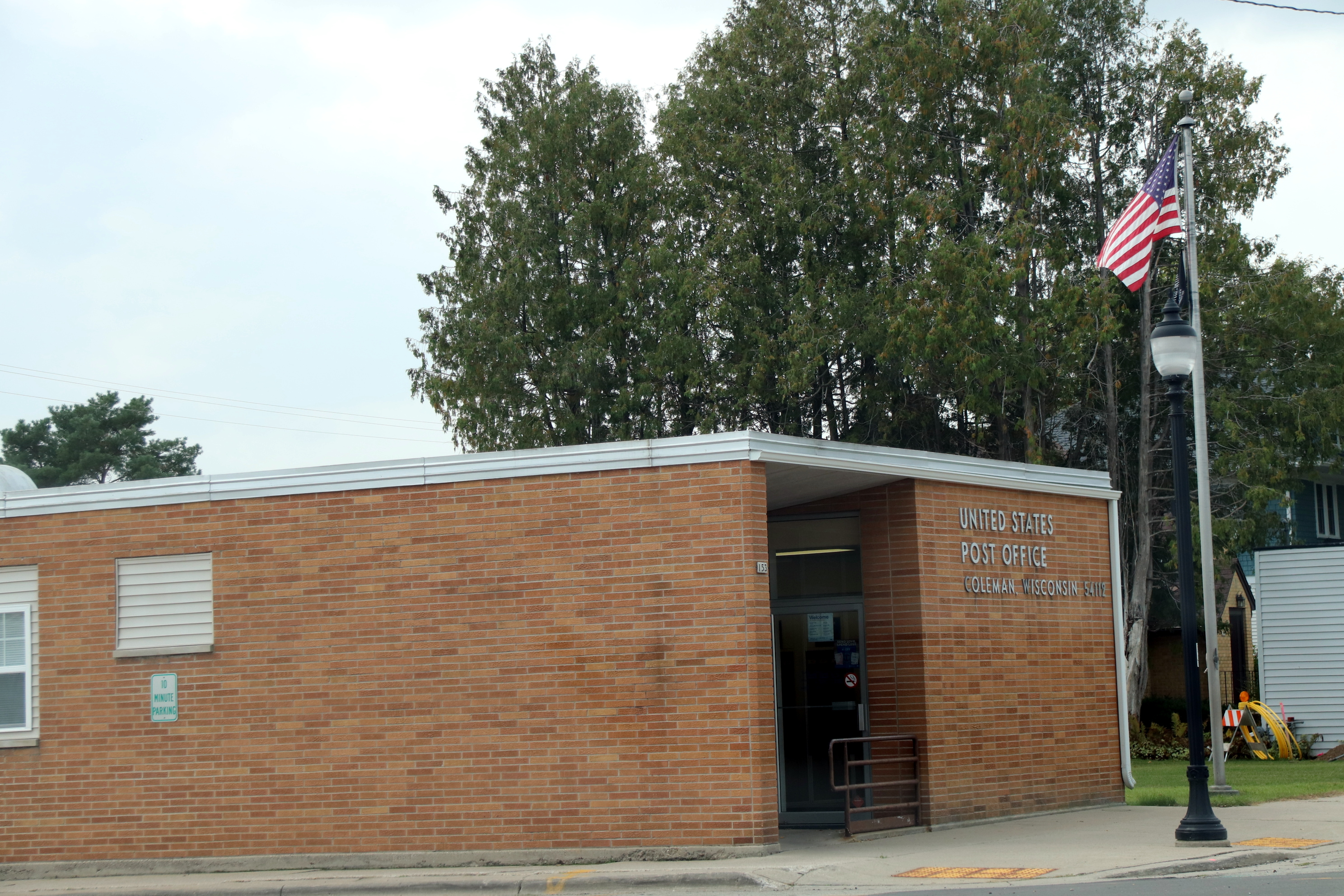
Post office

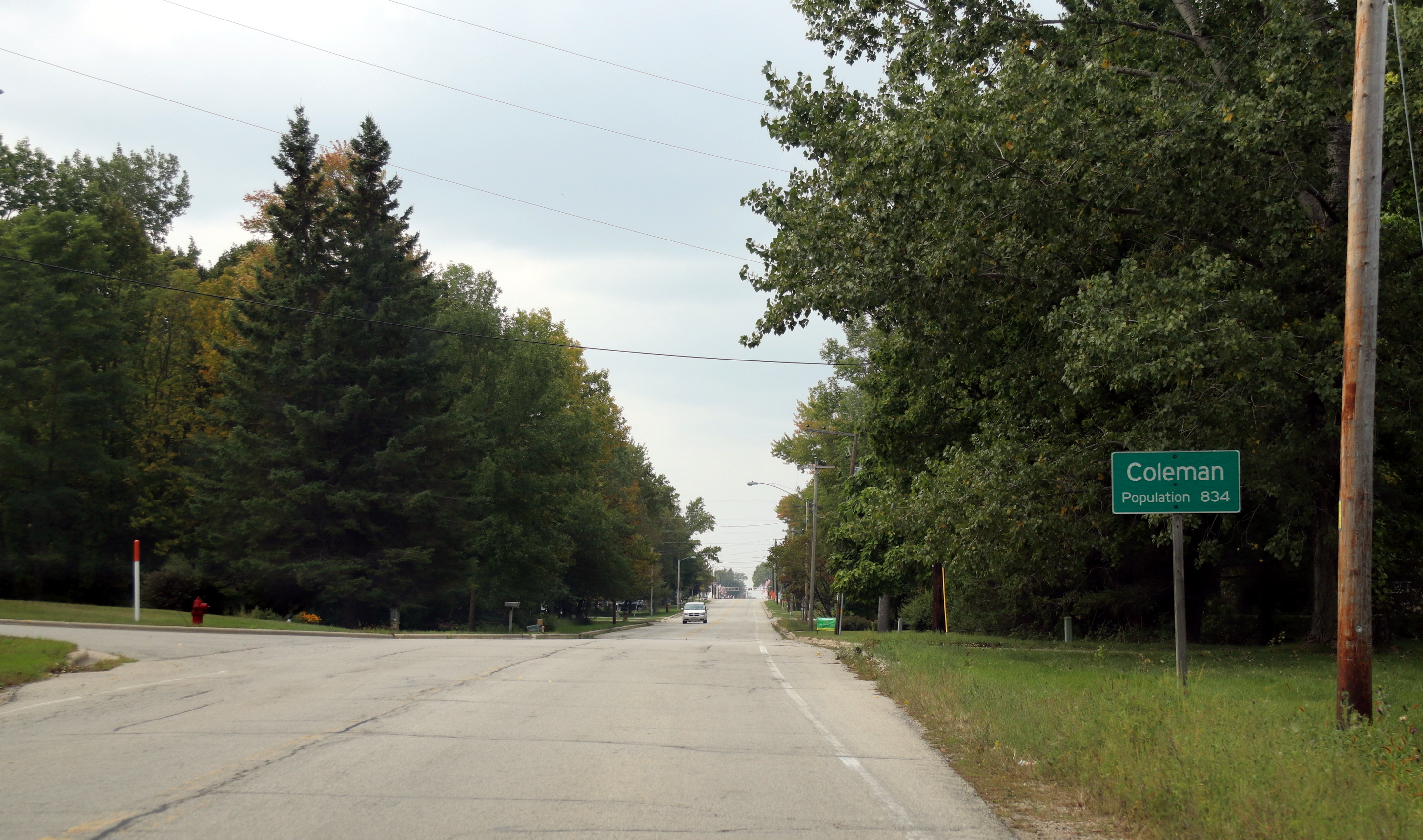
Sign for Coleman
