= Daggett, Michigan =

Village in Michigan, United States

- Village
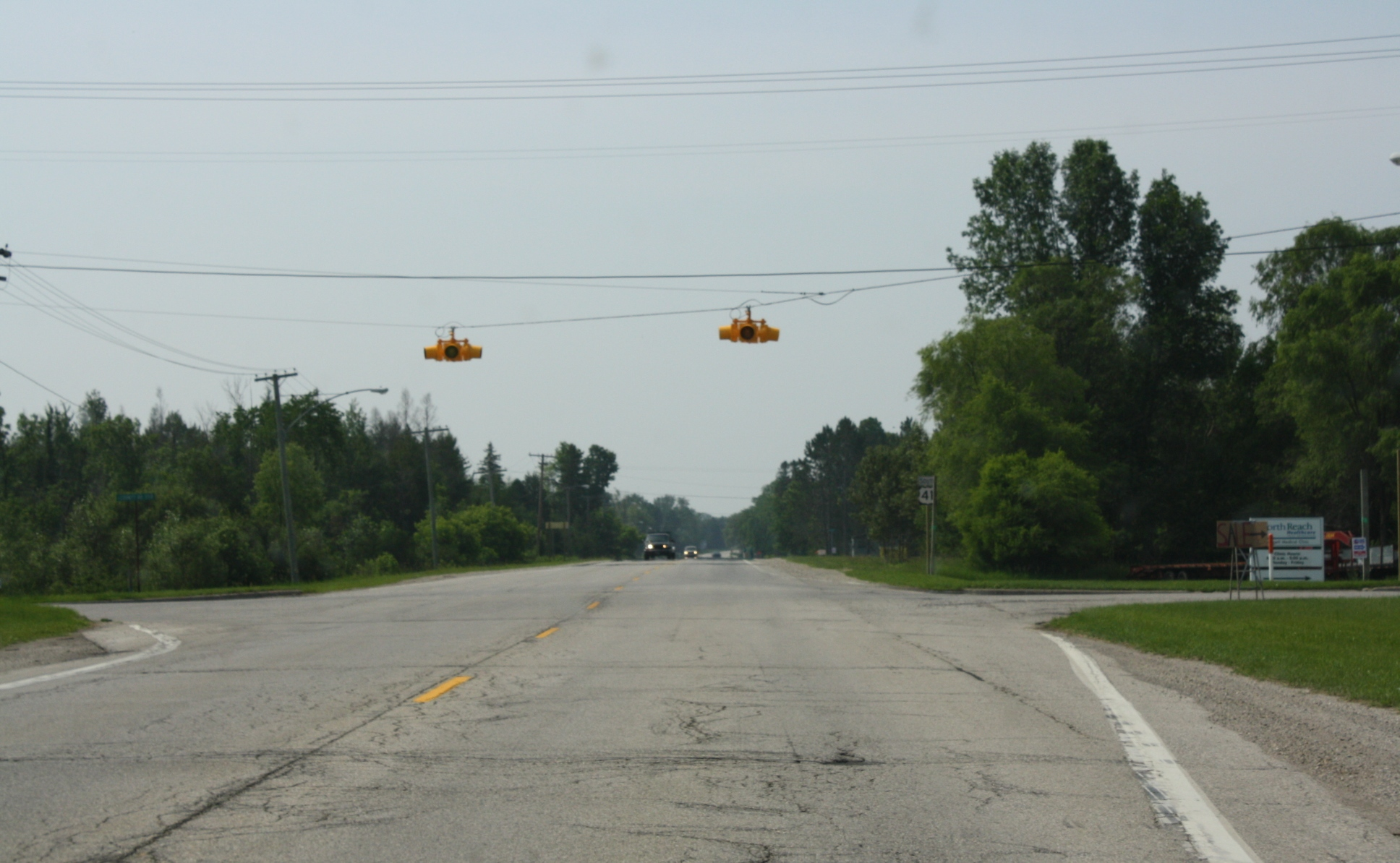
- Downtown Daggett along U.S. Route 41

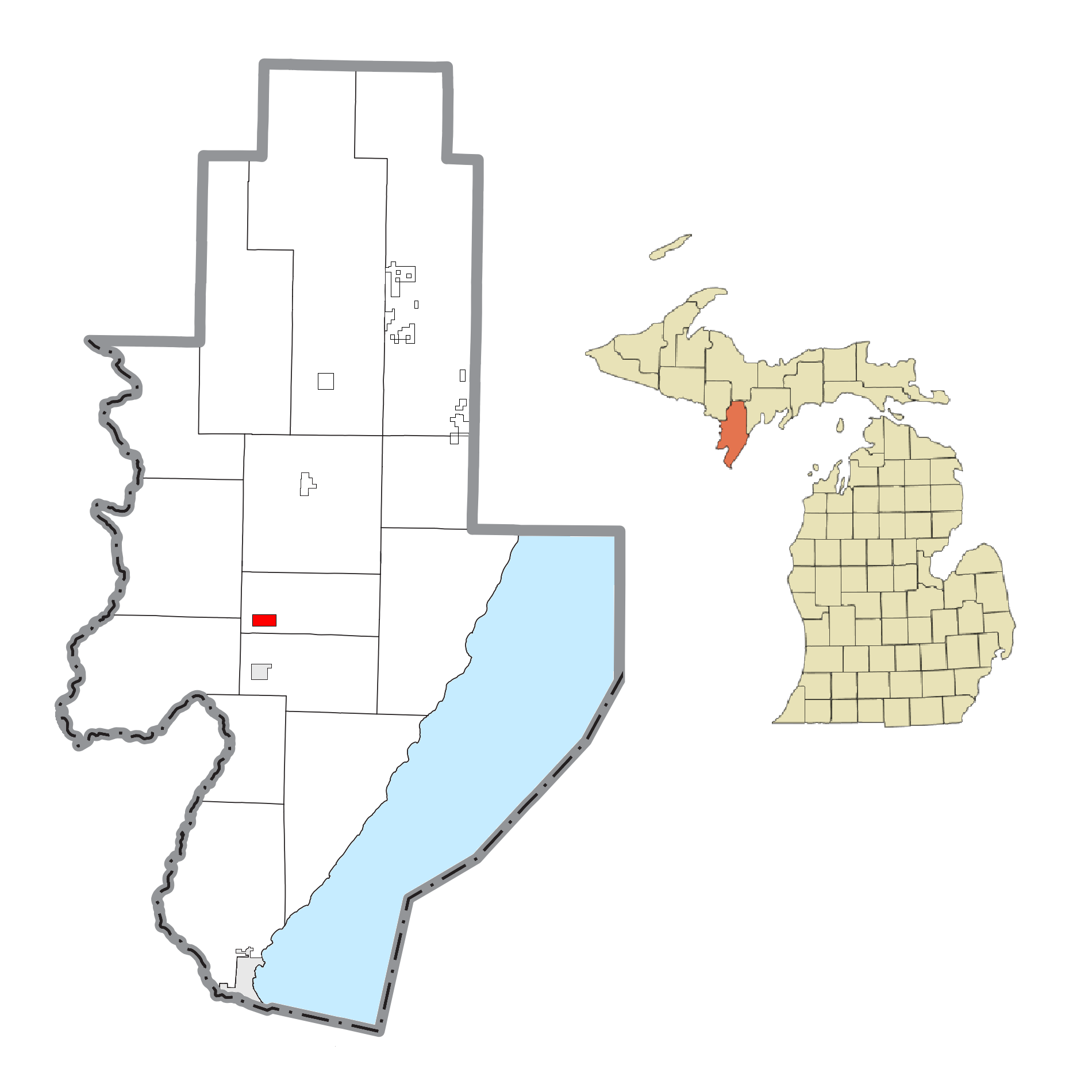
- Location within Menominee County and the state of Michigan

- Location within Michigan Location within the United States
- Coordinates: 45°27′47″N 87°36′10″W
- Country: United States
- State: Michigan
- County: Menominee
- Township: Daggett

Area
  - Total: 1.12 sq mi (2.90 km^{2})
  - Land: 1.12 sq mi (2.90 km^{2})
  - Water: 0 sq mi (0.00 km^{2})
- Elevation: 705 ft (215 m)

Population (2020)
  - Total: 201
  - Density: 179.3/sq mi (69.23/km^{2})
- Time zone: UTC-6 (Central (CST))
  - Summer (DST): UTC-5 (CDT)
- ZIP Code: 49821
- Area code: 906
- FIPS code: 26-19560
- GNIS feature ID: 0624271

Daggett is a village in Menominee County of the U.S. state of Michigan. The population was 201 at the 2020 census, down from 258 in 2010. The village is located within Daggett Township and is part of the Marinette, WI–MI Micropolitan Statistical Area.

== History ==
Daggett was originally named "Section 25". The name "Daggett" refers either to Elmira Daggett, a New York native who came to the area to visit her brother and is then said to have become the village's first postmistress, or to postmistress Clara Daggett's father (a native of Elmira, New York), the father-in-law of the village's founder, Thomas Faulkner.

The village of Daggett was incorporated on August 30, 1902. "Because of the number of fires in the village, and with no help from [Stephenson] township, the Daggett people decided the best way to get fire protection was to incorporate." Incorporated villages had been given the power to raise money for fire protection by the state legislature. The village lost little time in equipping a modern fire department. Mr. J. H. Earle, representing the Waterous Gasoline Fire Engine Co. of St. Paul, Minnesota, signed a contract with the village council on October 17, 1902, promising delivery of an engine and 1,000 feet of hose within 30 days.

The Waterous product was among the most modern of the era, representing the transition from heavy steam-powered pumps. It coupled a four-cylinder gasoline motor to a 350 gallon-per-minute pump. The entire apparatus was light enough to be pulled rapidly by a team of horses or men. To provide ready water sources for the pumper, the village contracted during the last week of October 1902 for four cisterns to be dug at different locations in the village. The contract was completed by November 15, 1902.

The engine was delivered to the village between November 17–21, 1902, the exact date being uncertain. Based on the report in the November 22, 1902 Menominee County Journal, the Daggett Volunteer Fire Department commenced operations on November 21, 1902. The modern fire engine in use at Daggett drew attention from neighboring communities, including the Sturgeon Bay, Wisconsin, fire department, who visited Daggett in January 1903 to observe the new engine. The Waterous unit likely served the village until replaced by a motorized engine from the same company in 1925.

== Geography ==
Daggett is in south-central Menominee County along U.S. Route 41, which passes through the east side of the village and leads south 25 miles (40 km) to Menominee, the county seat, and north 17 miles (27 km) to Powers. The small city of Stephenson is 3 miles (5 km) south along US 41.

According to the United States Census Bureau, the village of Daggett has a total area of 1.12 square miles (2.90 km^{2}), all land. The Little Cedar River, a south-flowing tributary of the Menominee River, passes just south of the village.

== Demographics ==
Historical population
Census	Pop.	Note	%±
1910	228		—
1920	321		40.8%
1930	291		−9.3%
1940	283		−2.7%
1950	341		20.5%
1960	296		−13.2%
1970	366		23.6%
1980	274		−25.1%
1990	260		−5.1%
2000	270		3.8%
2010	258		−4.4%
2020	201		−22.1%
U.S. Decennial Census

=== 2010 census ===
As of the census of 2010, there were 258 people, 91 households, and 63 families residing in the village. The population density was 232.4 inhabitants per square mile (89.7/km^{2}). There were 111 housing units at an average density of 100.0 per square mile (38.6/km^{2}). The racial makeup of the village was 90.3% White, 6.2% African American, 1.2% Asian, 1.6% from other races, and 0.8% from two or more races. Hispanic or Latino of any race were 6.6% of the population.

There were 91 households, of which 37.4% had children under the age of 18 living with them, 59.3% were married couples living together, 7.7% had a female householder with no husband present, 2.2% had a male householder with no wife present, and 30.8% were non-families. 25.3% of all households were made up of individuals, and 9.9% had someone living alone who was 65 years of age or older. The average household size was 2.84 and the average family size was 3.52.

The median age in the village was 36.8 years. 30.6% of residents were under the age of 18; 6.5% were between the ages of 18 and 24; 22.4% were from 25 to 44; 24.1% were from 45 to 64; and 16.3% were 65 years of age or older. The gender makeup of the village was 51.2% male and 48.8% female.

=== 2000 census ===
As of the census of 2000, there were 270 people, 100 households, and 71 families residing in the village. The population density was 244.3 inhabitants per square mile (94.3/km^{2}). There were 109 housing units at an average density of 98.6 per square mile (38.1/km^{2}). The racial makeup of the village was 98.52% White, 0.37% African American, and 1.11% from two or more races.

There were 100 households, out of which 46.0% had children under the age of 18 living with them, 52.0% were married couples living together, 18.0% had a female householder with no husband present, and 29.0% were non-families. 25.0% of all households were made up of individuals, and 12.0% had someone living alone who was 65 years of age or older. The average household size was 2.70 and the average family size was 3.24.

In the village, the population was spread out, with 35.2% under the age of 18, 6.3% from 18 to 24, 28.5% from 25 to 44, 16.3% from 45 to 64, and 13.7% who were 65 years of age or older. The median age was 34 years. For every 100 females, there were 87.5 males. For every 100 females age 18 and over, there were 92.3 males.

The median income for a household in the village was $24,583, and the median income for a family was $28,750. Males had a median income of $26,000 versus $19,375 for females. The per capita income for the village was $9,910. About 21.5% of families and 24.1% of the population were below the poverty line, including 34.4% of those under the age of eighteen and 7.3% of those 65 or over.

== Notable people ==
- Francis P. Hammerberg (1920-1945), U.S. Navy diver
- Judy Nerat (1948-2012), politician
- Mabel Wandelt (1917-2008), nurse

== Gallery ==
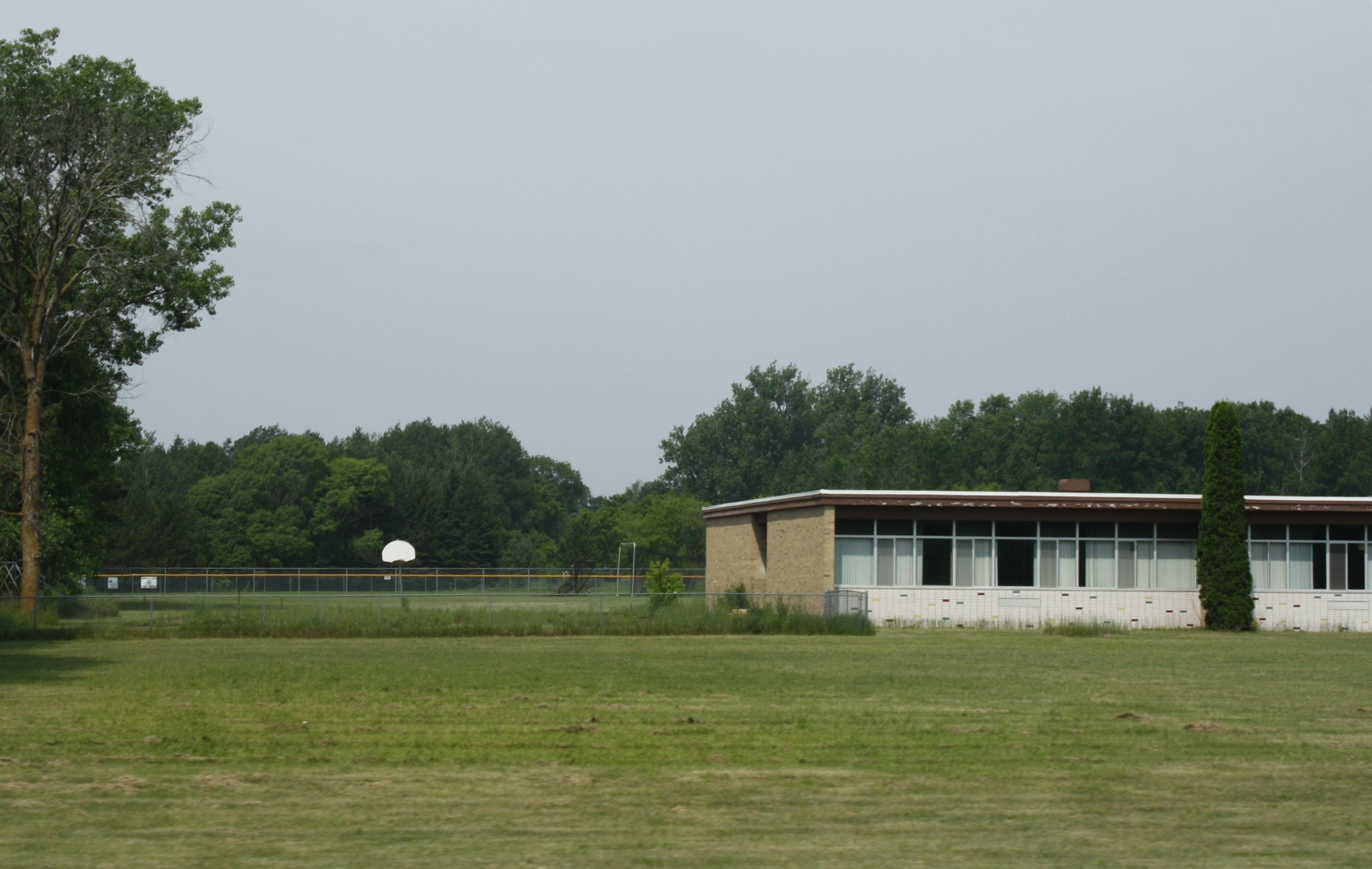
School

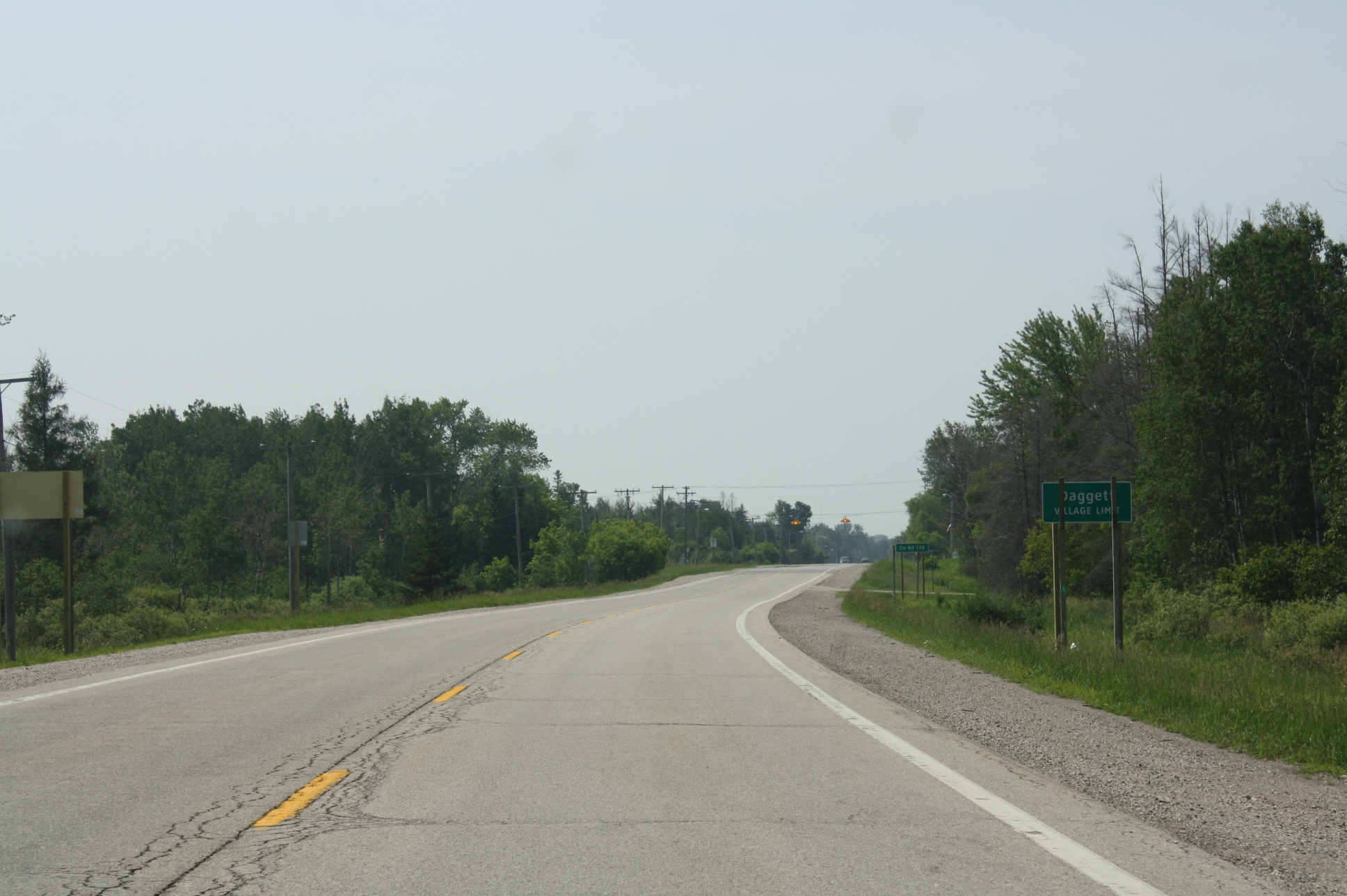
Welcome sign on US 41
