= Walton River =

Location
- Country: Michigan

Physical characteristics
- Source
  - location: North Lake outflow
  - coordinates: 45°24′04″N 87°28′36″W
  - elevation: Approximately 645 feet
- Mouth
  - location: Confluence with Cedar River
  - coordinates: 45°24′51″N 87°21′03″W
  - elevation: 581 feet

The Walton River is a 12.2-mile-long (19.6 km) tributary of the Cedar River on the Upper Peninsula of Michigan in the United States. It joins the Cedar River at the village of Cedar River, less than 0.4 miles (0.6 km) from the mouth of the Cedar River in Lake Michigan.

== See also ==
- List of rivers of Michigan
