= Mabel Wandelt =

American nurse

Mabel Ann Wandelt (1917–2008) was an American nurse who made important contributions to the assessment of nursing quality within healthcare organizations. Wandelt was a nursing professor at Wayne State University, the University of Delaware and the University of Texas at Austin. She developed the Quality Patient Care Scale (Qualpacs) and performed much of the nursing retention research that later formed the Magnet Recognition Program.

== Biography ==
Mabel Wandelt was born in Daggett, Michigan in 1917. She received a nursing diploma from Michael Reese Hospital in Chicago. She earned an undergraduate degree in public health nursing from Wayne State University in 1944. She attended graduate school at the University of Michigan, graduating with a Master of Public Health in 1948 and a doctorate in education in 1954.

Wandelt's early professional experiences included service in the Army Nurse Corps and a stint as a tuberculosis specialist in Washington, DC. She worked as a nurse educator at a Texas hospital before joining the faculty at Wayne State University in 1958. In 1973, Wandelt moved to the University of Delaware, where she served as a professor, assistant dean and acting dean. She taught at the University of Texas at Austin from 1977 to 1982, when she was named a Professor Emeritus.

While performing research on nursing turnover in Texas hospitals, Wandelt noticed an unexpected phenomenon. She found that where a particular hospital might be struggling with nursing recruitment and retention, there was often a nearby hospital having no such difficulties. Wandelt proposed to study these successful organizations and was one of four authors who published Magnet Hospitals: Attraction and Retention of Professional Nurses. This publication formed the basis of the Magnet Recognition Program. Wandelt and a colleague created the Quality Patient Care Scale (Qualpacs), an observational rating scale to measure nursing care quality. The details of the scale were published in 1974 and Wandelt's work influenced future metrics of nursing care. Wandelt was also the author of Guide for the Beginning Researcher and she served as an international nursing consultant.

In 1997, Wandelt was named a Living Legend by the American Academy of Nursing. She died at the age of 91 on November 20, 2008.
