= Meyer Township, Michigan =

- Civil township
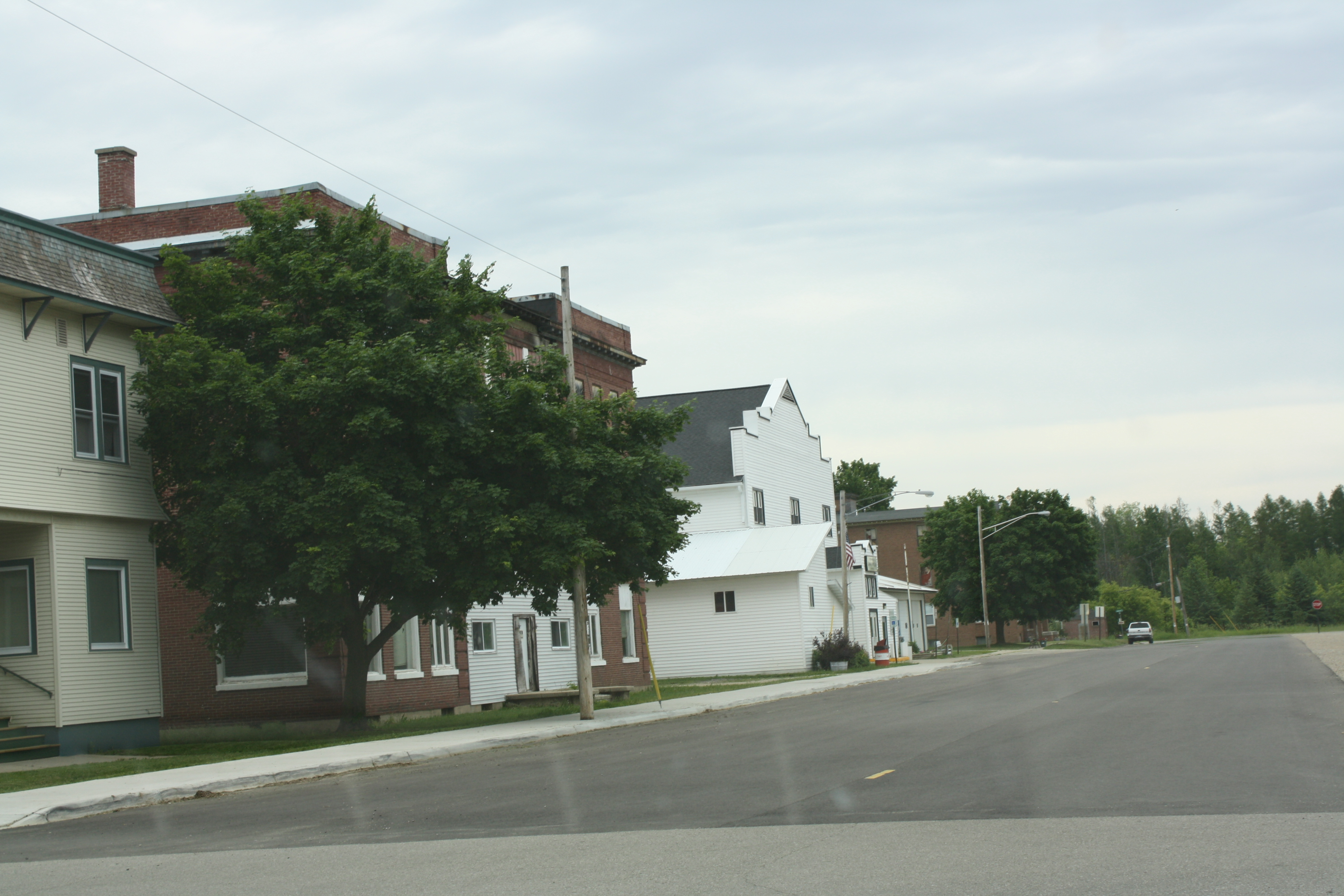
- Unincorporated community of Hermansville

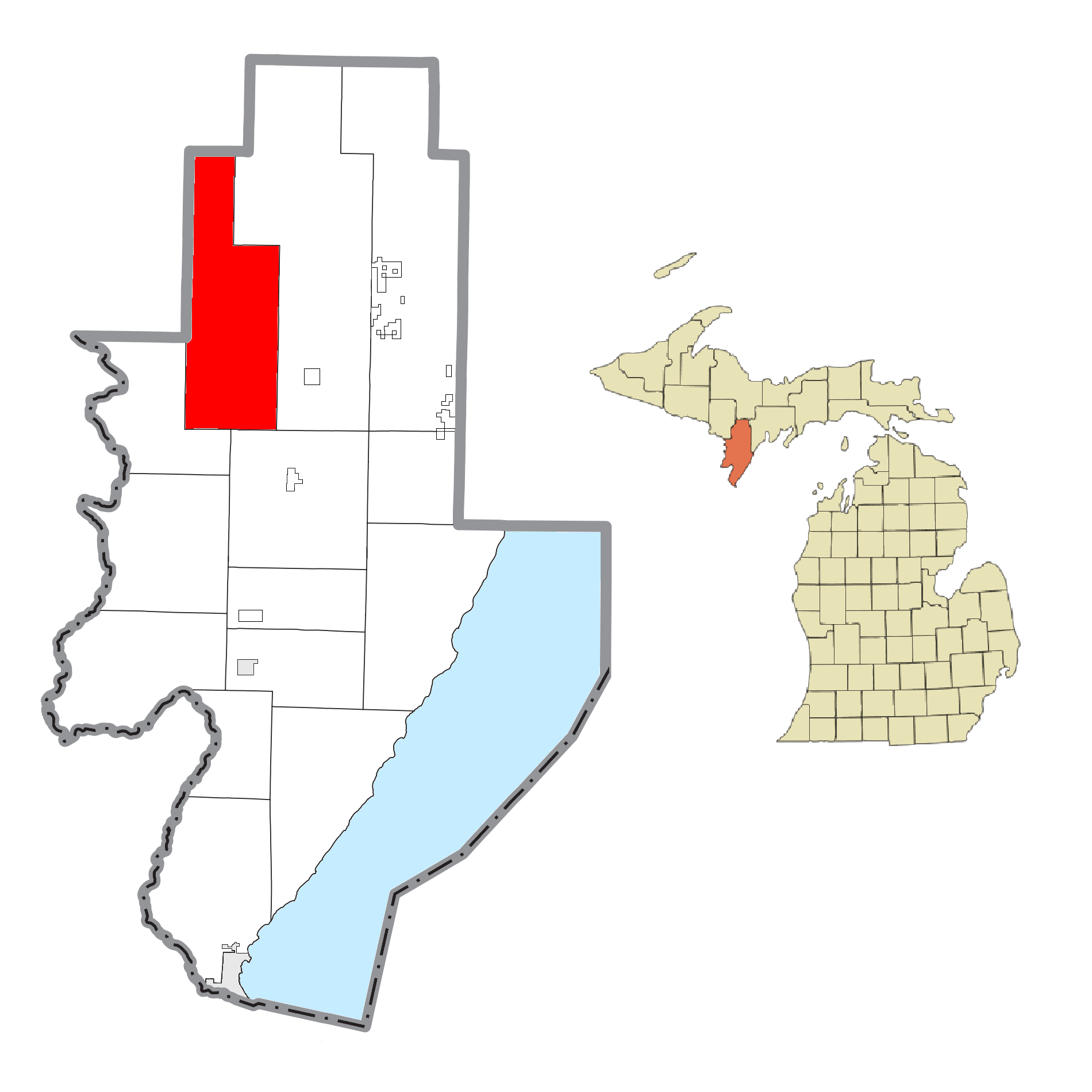
- Location within Menominee County and the state of Michigan

- Location within Michigan Location within the United States
- Coordinates: 45°43′40″N 87°37′26″W
- Country: United States
- State: Michigan
- County: Menominee
- Founded: 1878

Government
  - Supervisor: Chad Knodl

Area
  - Total: 90.0 sq mi (233 km^{2})
  - Land: 89.6 sq mi (232 km^{2})
  - Water: 0.4 sq mi (1.0 km^{2})
- Elevation: 938 ft (286 m)

Population (2020)
  - Total: 992
  - Density: 11.1/sq mi (4.3/km^{2})
- Time zone: UTC-6 (Central (CST))
  - Summer (DST): UTC-5 (CDT)
- ZIP Codes: 49847 (Hermansville); 49873 (Perronville); 49892 (Vulcan)
- Area code: 906
- FIPS code: 26-109-53460
- GNIS feature ID: 1626732
- Website: hermansville.com

Meyer Township is a civil township of Menominee County in the U.S. state of Michigan. The population was 992 at the 2020 census. Most of the population is concentrated in Hermansville, an unincorporated village within the township.

== Geography ==
Meyer Township is in northwestern Menominee County, bordered to the west and north by Dickinson County. Hermansville is in the southeastern part of the township. U.S. Route 2 crosses the township, passing through Hermansville and leading east 27 miles (43 km) to Escanaba and west 25 miles (40 km) to Iron Mountain. Menominee, the Menominee county seat, is 46 miles (74 km) to the south.

According to the United States Census Bureau, Meyer Township has a total area of 90.0 square miles (233 km^{2}), of which 89.6 square miles (232 km^{2}) are land and 0.4 square miles (1.0 km^{2}), or 0.48%, are water. The Little Cedar River drains the southern part of the township, forming Hermansville Lake on the west side of Hermansville and flowing south to the Menominee River near Wallace. Spruce Creek drains the central part of the township, flowing southeast toward the Cedar River, a direct tributary of Lake Michigan. The northernmost part of the township is drained by Pollock Creek, which flows west to the Sturgeon River, a south-flowing tributary of the Menominee.

== Communities ==
- Cunard is an unincorporated community at 45°44′16.9″N 87°40′0.5″W.
- Hermansville is an unincorporated community and census-designated place at 45°42′33.5″N 87°36′28.3″W.

== Demographics ==
Historical population
Census	Pop.	Note	%±
1890	1,252		—
1900	1,387		10.8%
1910	1,628		17.4%
1920	1,439		−11.6%
1930	1,561		8.5%
1940	1,536		−1.6%
1950	1,069		−30.4%
1960	973		−9.0%
1970	1,004		3.2%
1980	1,004		0.0%
1990	1,090		8.6%
2000	1,036		−5.0%
2010	1,001		−3.4%
2020	992		−0.9%
U.S. Decennial Census

As of the census of 2000, there were 1,036 people, 440 households, and 285 families residing in the township. By 2020, its population was 992.
