= Carbondale, Michigan =

- Unincorporated community
- Location within the state of Michigan
- Coordinates: 45°16′42″N 87°36′57″W
- Country: United States
- State: Michigan
- County: Menominee
- Township: Menominee
- Elevation: 663 ft (202 m)
- Time zone: UTC-6 (Central (CST))
  - Summer (DST): UTC-5 (CDT)
- ZIP code(s): 49893
- Area code: 906
- GNIS feature ID: 1617474

Carbondale is an unincorporated community in Menominee County, in the U.S. state of Michigan.

== History ==
A post office was established at Carbondale in 1881, and remained in operation until it was discontinued in 1904. The community was so named from the presence of a factory manufacturing charcoal, a carbon-based fuel.
