= Little Cedar River (Menominee River tributary) =

Location
- Country: United States

Physical characteristics
- Source
  - location: Meyer Township, Menominee County
- Mouth
  - location: Menominee River
  - elevation: 630 ft (190 m)

Little Cedar River is a 56.7-mile-long (91.2 km) river in Menominee County in the U.S. state of Michigan.

The Little Cedar rises in Meyer Township at 45°45′00″N 87°39′17″W, approximately 4 miles (6.4 km) northwest of Hermansville. It flows primarily south through Hermansville, then along the western side of Nadeau Township, passing briefly into Faithorn Township, and continuing through the village of Daggett, Daggett Township, the city of Stephenson, Stephenson Township, and into Mellen Township, where it empties into the Menominee River at 45°45′00″N 87°39′17″W. Much of its course runs approximately parallel to US 41.

== Tributaries ==
From the mouth:

- (left) Little Kelley Creek
- (right) Hugos Brook
- (right) Hays Creek
  - (right) Boyle Creek
    - (right) DeGroote Lake
- (left) Ross Creek
- (left) Snow Creek
- (right) Poterfield Creek
  - (right) Holmes Creek
  - Kloman Lake (on Poterfield Creek)
- (right) Schetter Creek
- (right) Laurin Creek
- (left) Bog Brook
- (left) Nadeau Creek
- (left) Camp Two Creek
- Hermansville Lake
