= Daggett Township, Michigan =

- Civil township
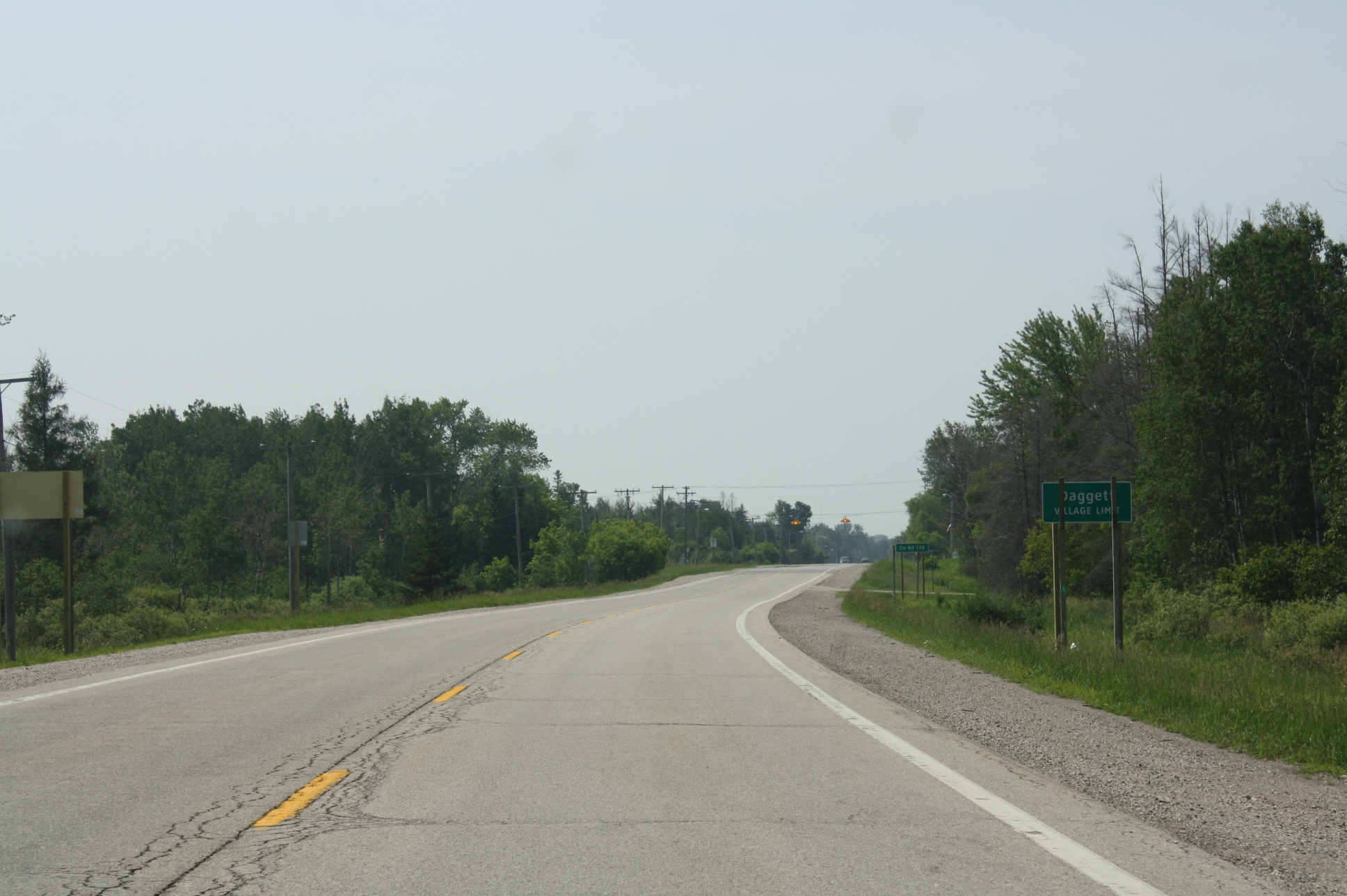
- Community of Daggett along U.S. Route 41

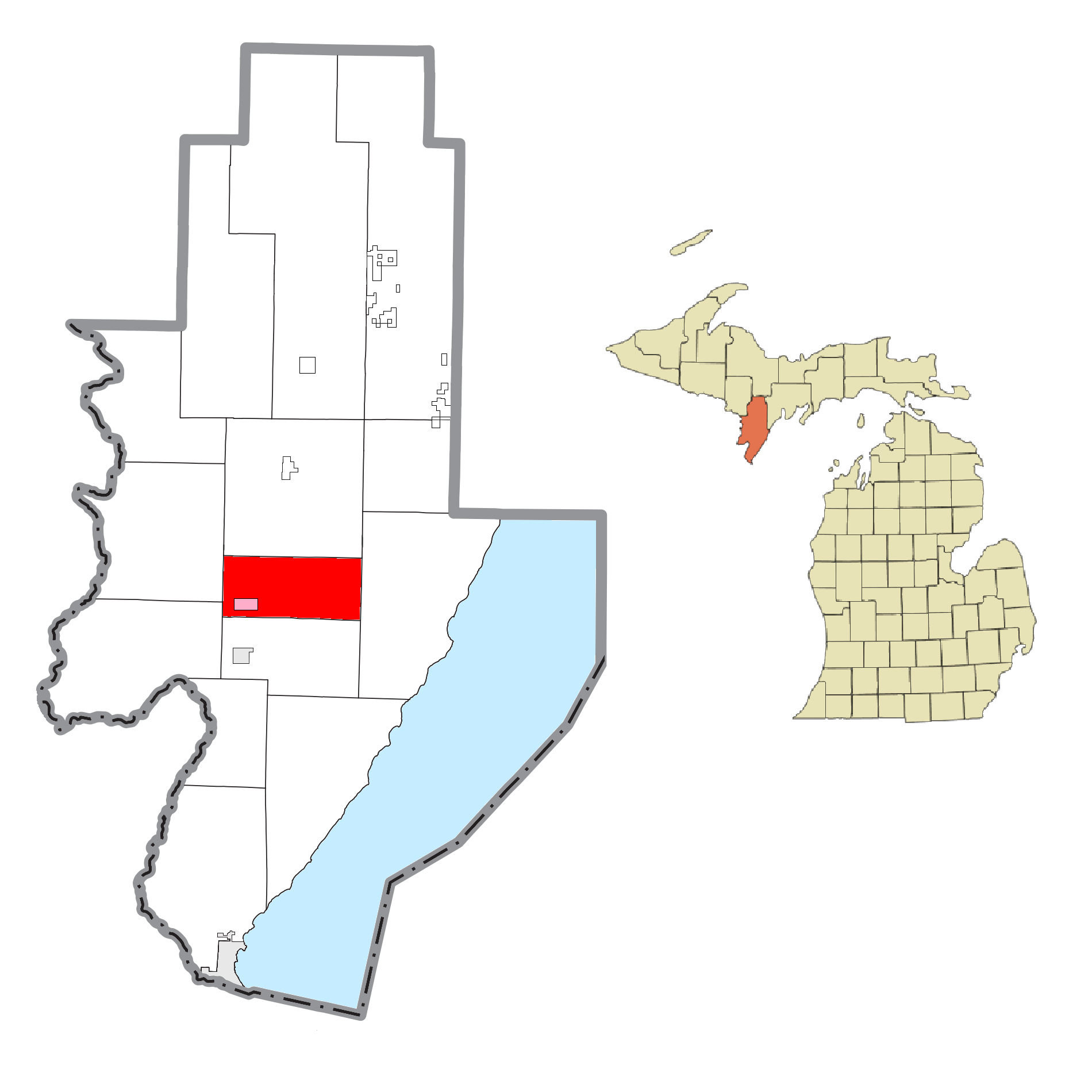
- Location within Menominee County (red) and the administered village of Daggett (pink)

- Location within the state of Michigan Daggett Township (the United States)
- Coordinates: 45°28′45″N 87°34′10″W
- Country: United States
- State: Michigan
- County: Menominee

Area
  - Total: 36.1 sq mi (93 km^{2})
  - Land: 35.9 sq mi (93 km^{2})
  - Water: 0.2 sq mi (0.52 km^{2})
- Elevation: 771 ft (235 m)

Population (2020)
  - Total: 614
  - Density: 17.1/sq mi (6.6/km^{2})
- Time zone: UTC-6 (Central (CST))
  - Summer (DST): UTC-5 (CDT)
- ZIP Codes: 49821 (Daggett); 49887 (Stephenson)
- Area code: 906
- FIPS code: 26-109-19580
- GNIS feature ID: 1626155

Daggett Township is a civil township of Menominee County in the U.S. state of Michigan. The population was 614 at the 2020 census, down from 714 in 2010. The village of Daggett is located within the township.

== Geography ==
The township is south of the geographic center of Menominee County, with the village of Daggett in the southwest part of the township. U.S. Route 41 crosses the west side of the township, passing through the east side of Daggett village and leading north 9 miles (14 km) to Carney and south 25 miles (40 km) to Menominee, the county seat.

According to the United States Census Bureau, the township has a total area of 36.1 square miles (93 km^{2}), of which 35.9 square miles (93 km^{2}) are land and 0.2 square miles (0.5 km^{2}), or 0.43%, are water. The Little Cedar River crosses the west side in a wandering fashion, flowing south toward the Menominee River.

== Demographics ==
Historical population
Census	Pop.	Note	%±
1930	954		—
1940	923		−3.2%
1950	885		−4.1%
1960	739		−16.5%
1970	777		5.1%
1980	803		3.3%
1990	745		−7.2%
2000	740		−0.7%
2010	714		−3.5%
2020	614		−14.0%
U.S. Decennial Census

As of the census of 2000, there were 740 people, 284 households, and 209 families residing in the township. In 2020, its population was 614.
