= Nadeau =

Nadeau may refer to:

== People ==
- Bradly Nadeau (born 2005), Canadian ice hockey player
- Brian Nadeau, American politician
- Brianne Nadeau (born 1980), American politician
- Catherine Nadeau, American politician
- Cathy Nadeau, American politician
- Jacques Nadeau (1953–2025), Canadian photojournalist
- Jerry Nadeau (born 1970), American race car driver
- Joseph-Armand Nadeau (1928–1963), Canadian politician
- Joseph P. Nadeau (born 1936), justice of the New Hampshire Supreme Court
- Kelly-Ann Nadeau (born 1998), Canadian ice hockey player
- Louise Nadeau (born 1947), Canadian psychologist
- Luann de Lesseps (née Nadeau, born 1965), American celebrity
- Marcellin Nadeau (born 1962), French politician
- Remi Nadeau (1920–2016), American historian
- Richard Nadeau (born 1959), Canadian teacher and politician from Quebec
- Robert Nadeau (aikidoka) (born 1937), American aikido teacher
- Robert Nadeau (science historian) (1944–2025), American environmental scientist and science historian
- Samuel Nadeau (born 1982), French basketball player

== Places ==
- Nadeau, Michigan
- Nadeau Township, Michigan
