= Cedarville Township, Michigan =

- Civil township
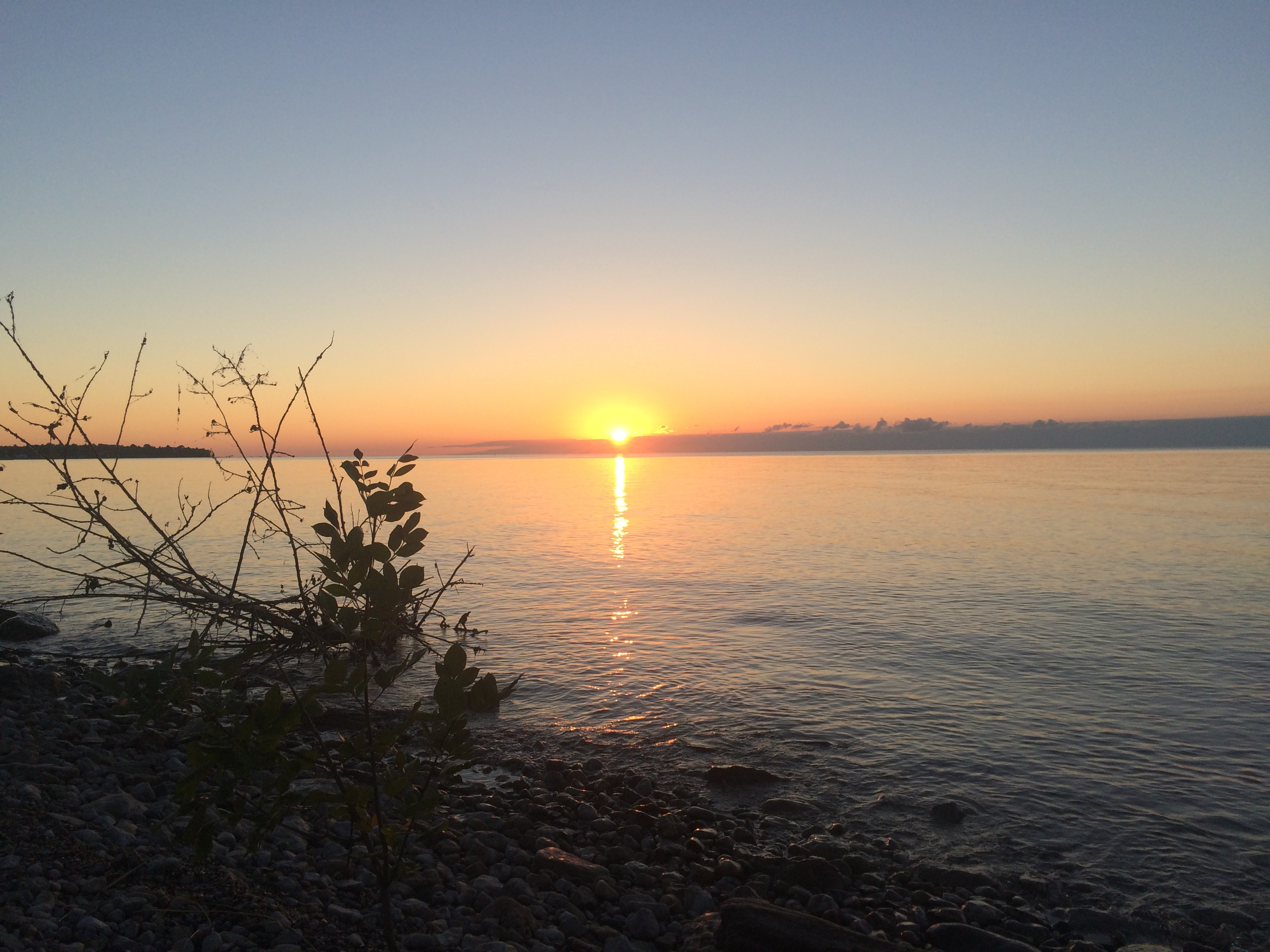
- Sunset over Green Bay from Wells State Park

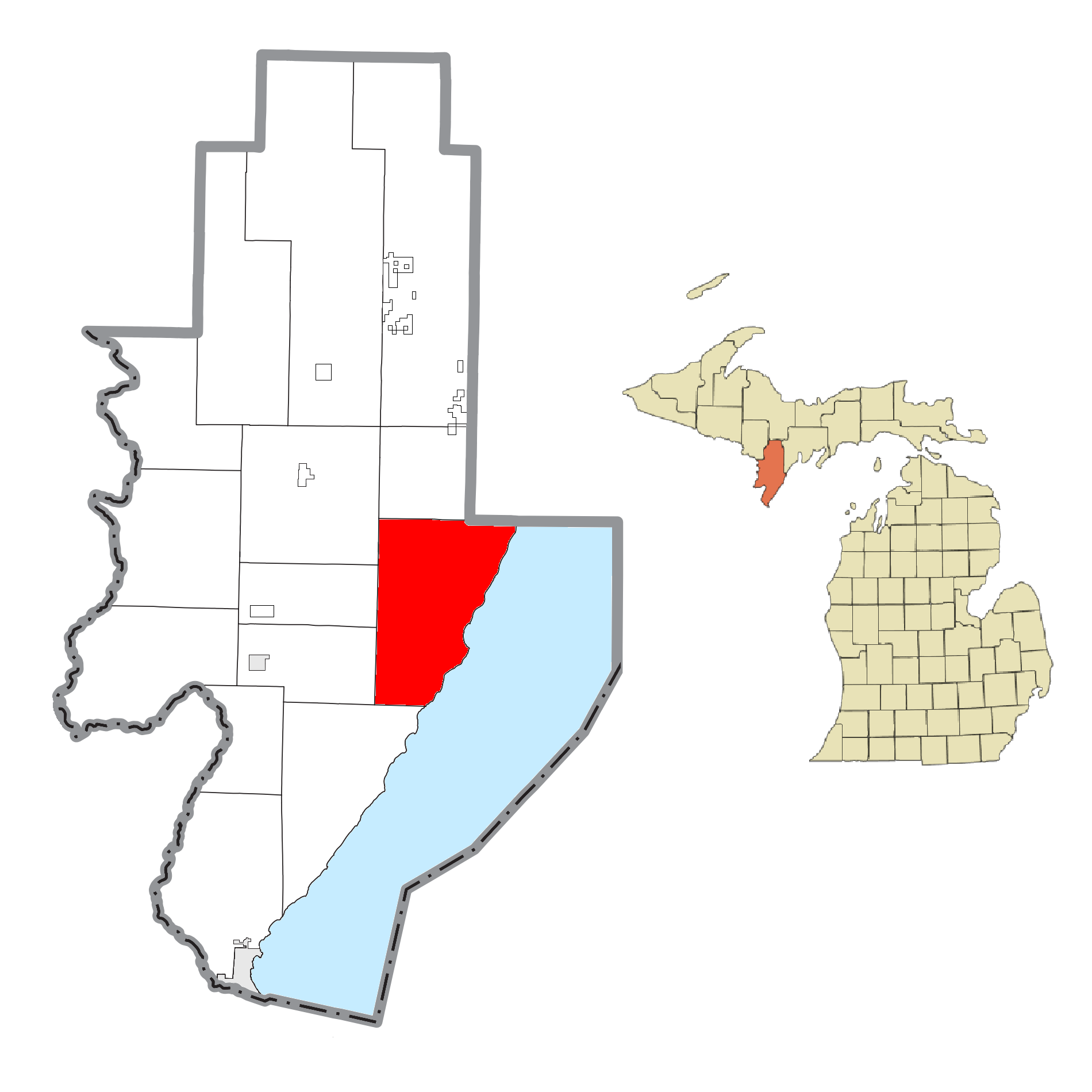
- Location within Menominee County and the state of Michigan

- Location within Michigan Location within the United States
- Coordinates: 45°29′00″N 87°23′15″W
- Country: United States
- State: Michigan
- County: Menominee

Area
  - Total: 79.1 sq mi (205 km^{2})
  - Land: 79.0 sq mi (205 km^{2})
  - Water: 0.1 sq mi (0.26 km^{2})
- Elevation: 627 ft (191 m)

Population (2020)
  - Total: 242
  - Density: 3.06/sq mi (1.18/km^{2})
- Time zone: UTC-6 (Central (CST))
  - Summer (DST): UTC-5 (CDT)
- ZIP Codes: 49887 (Cedar River); 49821 (Daggett); 49812 (Carney)
- Area code: 906
- FIPS code: 26-109-14240
- GNIS feature ID: 1626050

Cedarville Township is a civil township of Menominee County in the U.S. state of Michigan. The population was 242 as of the 2020 census. The township was established in 1863.

== Geography ==
The township is in eastern Menominee County on the west shore of Lake Michigan's Green Bay. It is bordered to the northeast by Delta County. According to the United States Census Bureau, the township has a total area of 79.1 square miles (205 km^{2}), of which 79.0 square miles (205 km^{2}) are land and 0.1 square miles (0.26 km^{2}), or 0.13%, are water. Much of the land in the township is part of Escanaba River State Forest. The bulk of the township is drained by the Cedar River, including its tributary, the Walton River. The northeast part of the township is drained by Deer Creek and Olson Creek.

== Communities ==
- Cedar Forks was initially settled in 1850. It had a post office from 1852 until 1883.
- Cedar River is an unincorporated community in the township on highway M-35, 25 miles (40 km) northeast of Menominee, the county seat, and 29 miles (47 km) southwest of Escanaba. The community is at the mouth of the Cedar River on Green Bay at 45°24′40″N 87°21′17″W. The ZIP Code for the community and surrounding area is 49887. Wells State Park is located just south of Cedar River. Cedar River began with the establishment of a sawmill here in 1854.

== Demographics ==
As of the census of 2000, there were 276 people, 138 households, and 89 families residing in the township. In 2020, there were 242 residents in the township.
