= Indiantown =

Indiantown or Indian Town can refer to the following places in the United States:

- Indiantown, Florida, a village
- Indian Town, Alger County, Michigan, an unincorporated community
- Indiantown, Menominee County, Michigan, an unincorporated community
- Robin Glen-Indiantown, Michigan, a census-designated place
- Indiantown, South Carolina, an unincorporated community
- Indiantown Township, Bureau County, Illinois
