= Gourley Township, Michigan =

- Civil township
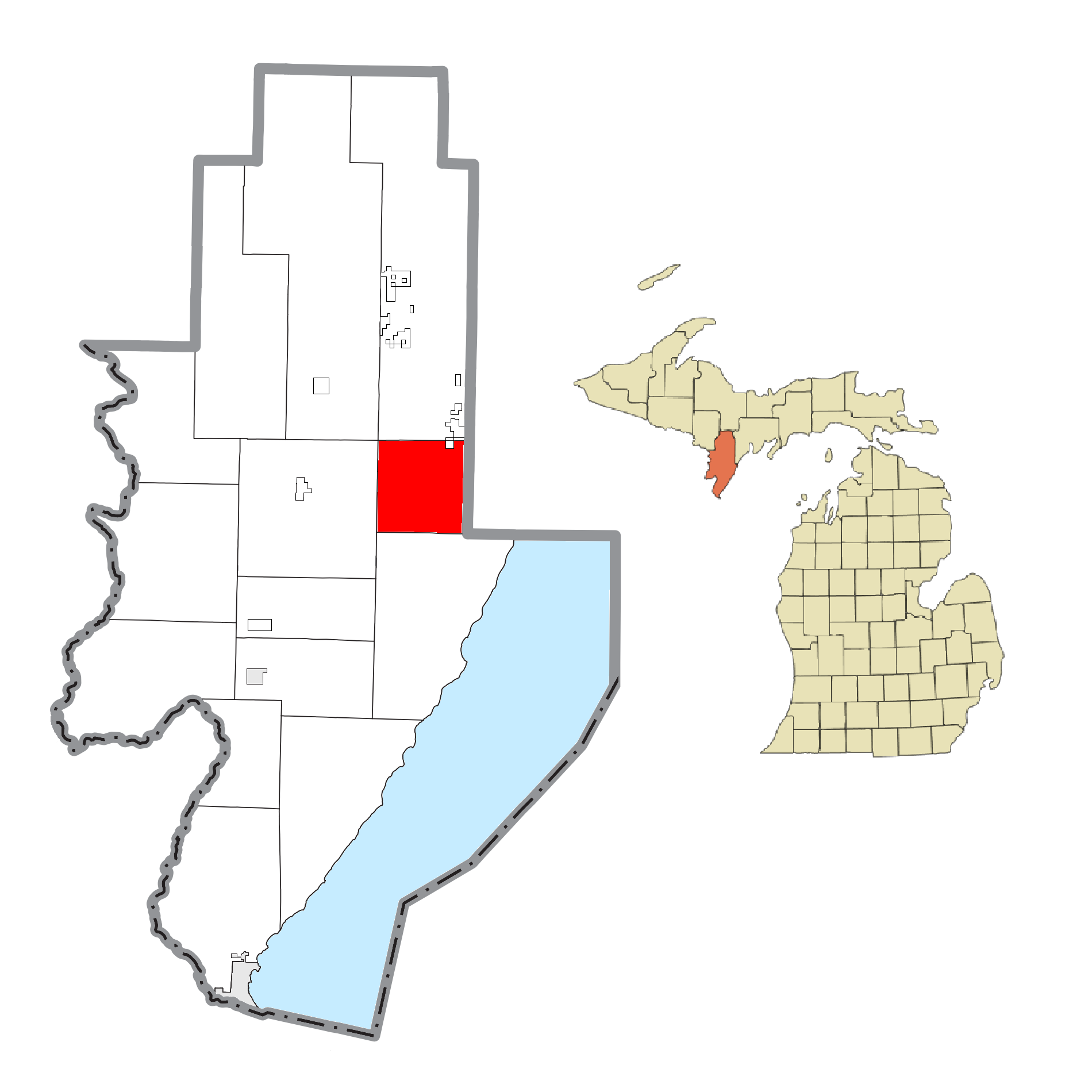
- Location within Menominee County and the state of Michigan

- Location within Michigan Location within the United States
- Coordinates: 45°36′23″N 87°22′42″W
- Country: United States
- State: Michigan
- County: Menominee
- Established: 1920

Area
  - Total: 35.76 sq mi (92.6 km^{2})
  - Land: 35.73 sq mi (92.5 km^{2})
  - Water: 0.03 sq mi (0.078 km^{2})
- Elevation: 709 ft (216 m)

Population (2020)
  - Total: 451
  - Density: 12.6/sq mi (4.9/km^{2})
- Time zone: UTC-6 (Central (CST))
  - Summer (DST): UTC-5 (CDT)
- ZIP Codes: 49812 (Carney); 49896 (Wilson)
- Area code: 906
- FIPS code: 26-109-33160
- GNIS feature ID: 1626366
- Website: www.gourleytownship.org

Gourley Township is a civil township of Menominee County in the U.S. state of Michigan. The population was 451 at the 2020 census.

Gourley Township was established in 1920.

== Geography ==
The township is in eastern Menominee County, bordered to the east by Delta County. It is 8 miles (13 km) east of Carney and 52 miles (84 km) by road northeast of Menominee, the county seat.

According to the U.S. Census Bureau, the township has a total area of 35.8 square miles (93 km^{2}), of which 35.7 square miles (92 km^{2}) are land and 0.03 square miles (0.078 km^{2}), or 0.10%, are water. The Cedar River, a tributary of Lake Michigan, flows across the township from north to south.

== Demographics ==
As of the census of 2000, there were 409 people, 166 households, and 124 families residing in the township. In 2020, there were 451 people in the township.
