= Indiantown, Michigan =

Indiantown or Indian Town may refer to multiple places in the state of Michigan:

- Indian Town, Alger County, Michigan, an unincorporated community in Alger County
- Indiantown, Menominee County, Michigan, an unincorporated community in Menominee County
- Robin Glen-Indiantown, Michigan, a census-designated place in Saginaw County
