= Tim Cahill (disambiguation) =

Tim Cahill (born 1979) is an Australian former footballer.

Tim Cahill may also refer to:

- Tim Cahill (Massachusetts politician) (born 1959), American politician in Massachusetts
- Tim Cahill (New Hampshire politician), American politician in New Hampshire
- Tim Cahill (writer) (born 1944), founding editor at Outside magazine and adventure travel book author
- Tim Cahill (producer) (born 1966), creator and director for My Gym Partner's a Monkey and Littlest Pet Shop
- Tim Cahill: The Unseen Journey, a documentary about the Australian footballer

== See also ==
- Cahill (group), a band named after the soccer player
