= Laughing Whitefish Falls State Park =

State park in Michigan, United States

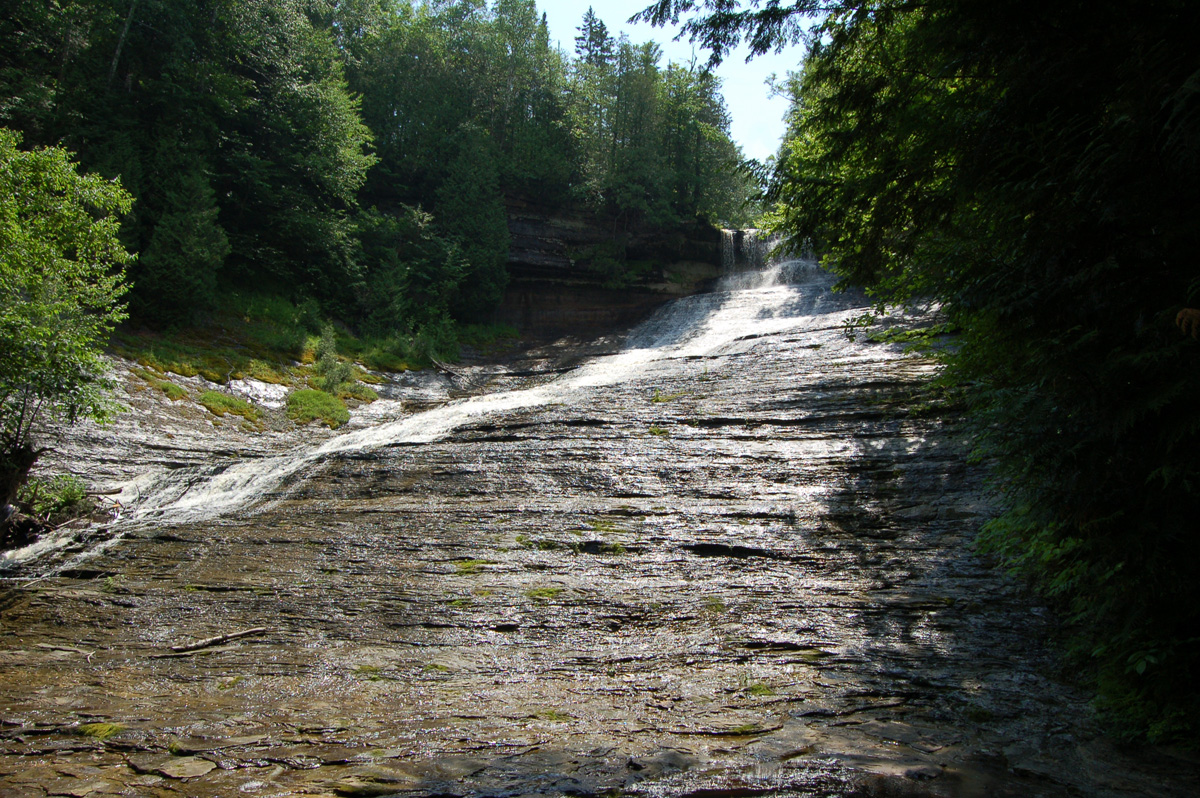
- Laughing Whitefish Falls

- Location within Michigan Location within the United States
- Location: Upper Peninsula, Alger County, Michigan, United States
- Nearest town: Sundell, Michigan
- Coordinates: 46°23′02″N 87°04′07″W
- Area: 960 acres (390 ha)
- Elevation: 971 feet (296 m)
- Established: 1946
- Administrator: Michigan Department of Natural Resources
- Designation: Michigan State Park
- Website: Official website
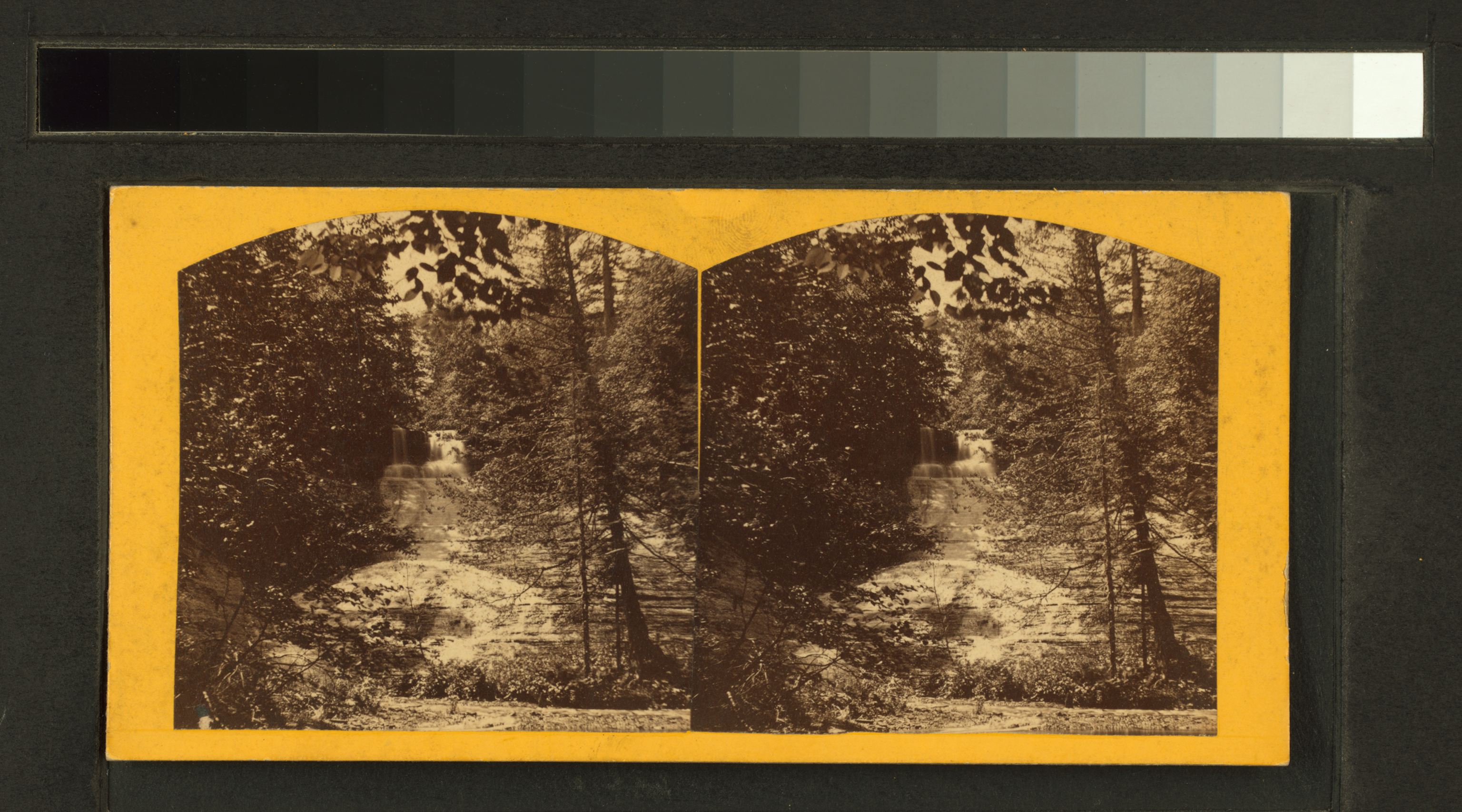
- Nineteenth-century stereoscopic view of the falls
- Interactive map of Laughing Whitefish Falls
- Location: Alger County, Michigan
- Type: Fan
- Total height: 100 feet (30 m)
- Number of drops: 1
- Watercourse: Laughing Whitefish River

Laughing Whitefish Falls State Park is a public recreation area protecting 960 acres (390 ha) along the Laughing Whitefish River in Onota Township and Rock River Township, in far western Alger County, Michigan. Its main scenic feature is Laughing Whitefish Falls, a 100-foot fan-shaped cascade located in the southern part of the site, in Rock River Township, eight miles (13 km) south of Lake Superior and three miles north of M-94.

== Waterfall ==
Laughing Whitefish Falls is formed by an abrupt limestone escarpment of the Laughing Whitefish River, which flows northward into Lake Superior. The escarpment is shaped so as to draw out the cascade into an unusual fan-shaped wall of water. The falls are located within the Escanaba River State Forest, three-quarters of a mile east of County Route 327 (North Sundell Road). It can be reached by a half-mile hike through beech-maple forest. Foot trails also connect the falls to the North Country Trail, which runs through the north end of the park.

== Activities and amenities ==
The park offers picnicking, three observation decks, and 2.5 miles (4.0 km) of hiking trails.

== See also ==
- List of waterfalls
