= Norway-Vulcan Area Schools =

School district in Michigan

Norway Vulcan Area Schools
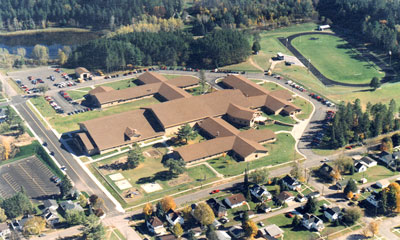

Address
- 300 Section Street Norway, Dickinson County, Michigan, 49870; United States

District information
- Grades: PreKindergarten–12
- Superintendent: Nicole Pipp
- Schools: 2
- Budget: $8,442,000 2022–2023 expenditures
- NCES District ID: 2626040

Students and staff
- Students: 566 (2024–2025)
- Teachers: 33.17 (on an FTE basis) (2024–2025)
- Staff: 68.15 FTE (2024–2025)
- Student–teacher ratio: 17.06 (2024–2025)
- District mascot: Knights
- Colors: Navy, White, and Gold

Other information
- Website: www.nvknights.org

Norway Vulcan Area Schools is a public school district in the Upper Peninsula of Michigan. In Dickinson County, it serves Norway, Norway Township, and Waucedah Township. In Menominee County, it serves Faithorn Township.

== History ==
The first public school in Norway opened in 1879, with classes held in a carpenter shop owned by the Menominee Range Mining Company. A series of schools was then built, including the Norway High School/Central School in 1892, and the second Norway High School (on the site of the current Norway-Vulcan School), built in 1906. It burned down on April 29, 1912 and was rebuilt that same year.

In Vulcan, the first school was established in 1877. The first dedicated school was built in 1879. A high school was built in 1909, and a grade school addition was added in 1927.

The Norway and Vulcan school districts merged in 1964. When the current school was built in 1991, the 1912 high school building was torn down.

== Schools ==
Schools in Norway-Vulcan Area Schools district share a building at 300 Section Street in Norway.

Schools in Jefferson Schools
School	Notes
Norway Junior/Senior High School	Grades 7–12
Norway Vulcan Elementary	Grades PreK-6
