= Wells State Park =

Wells State Park may refer to:

- Wells State Park (Massachusetts)
- Wells State Park (Michigan)
