= Susan Morissette =

American politician

Member Maine House of Representatives
- In office December, 2010 – December, 2012
- Preceded by: Kenneth C. Fletcher
- Succeeded by: Catherine Nadeau
- Constituency: 54th district

Personal details
- Party: Democratic
- Education: University of Maine

Susan Morissette is an American politician from Winslow, Maine. Morissette has served in the Maine House of Representatives. She represented Maine's 54th district for one term from 2010 to 2012.

== Electoral History ==
General election for Maine House of Representatives District 78, 2014
Party	Candidate	Votes	%
Democratic	Catherine Nadeau	2,233	55%
Republican	Susan Morissette	1,695	41.7%
None	Blank Votes	134	3.3%

General election for Maine House of Representatives District 54, 2012
Party	Candidate	Votes	%
Democratic	Catherine Nadeau	2,248	50.6%
Republican	Susan Morissette	2,196	49.4%

General election for Maine House of Representatives District 54, 2010
Party	Candidate	Votes	%
Republican	Susan Morissette	1,978	51%
Democratic	Catherine Nadeau	1,729	44%
