= Whitney, Michigan =

- Unincorporated community
- Location within the state of Michigan
- Coordinates: 45°49′20″N 87°23′16″W
- Country: United States
- State: Michigan
- County: Menominee
- Township: Harris
- Elevation: 860 ft (262 m)
- Time zone: UTC-6 (Central (CST))
  - Summer (DST): UTC-5 (CDT)
- ZIP code(s): 49807
- Area code: 906
- GNIS feature ID: 1617943

Whitney is an unincorporated community in Menominee County, in the U.S. state of Michigan.

== History ==
A post office was established at Whitney in 1883, and remained in operation until it was discontinued in 1939. The community was named for the owner of a local charcoal kiln.
