= Laughing Whitefish River =

River in Michigan

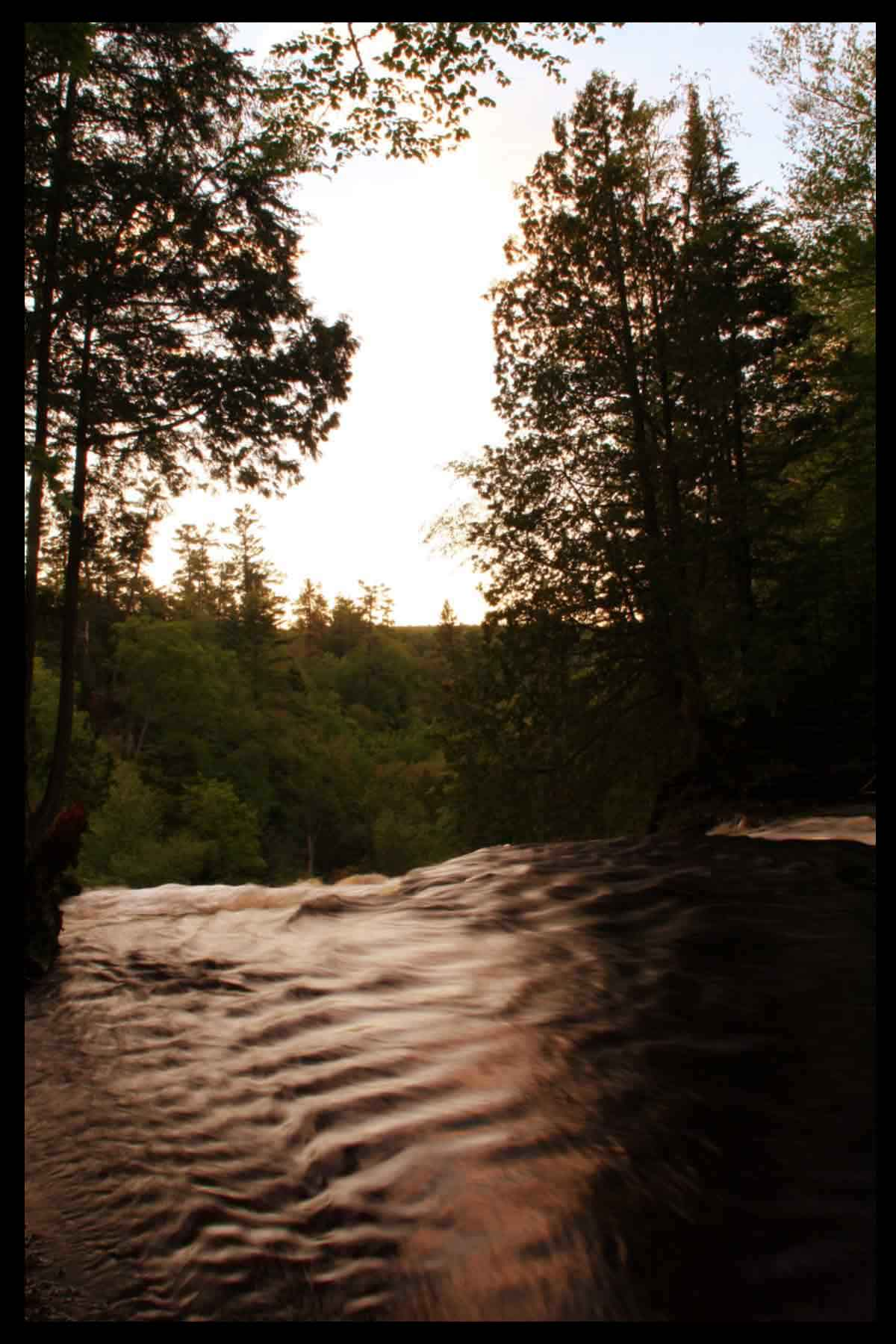
Laughing Whitefish River at the Laughing Whitefish Falls Scenic Site

The Laughing Whitefish River (not to be confused with the Whitefish River) is a 19.4-mile-long (31.2 km) stream located on the Upper Peninsula of the U.S. state of Michigan. The river rises in eastern Marquette County and flows east and then north through Alger County to its mouth on Lake Superior at 46°31′30″N 87°01′43″W a few miles north of Deerton, Michigan. The total watershed of the Laughing Whitefish River is 36 square miles (93 km^{2}).

A notable attraction near Sundell is the Laughing Whitefish Falls State Park. The Nature Conservancy has established a 1,728-acre (7 km^{2}) preserve that includes three-quarters of the lake as well as over 1,000 acres (4 km^{2}) of surrounding wetlands and upland forest.

The access site to the river is named after John Hammar who was the handyman for George Shiras III, who (Shiras) is credited with the development of flash photography, and was widely acclaimed at the St. Louis World Fair in 1904, and won the gold medal.

Jurist John D. Voelker, a justice of the Michigan Supreme Court, published the novel Laughing Whitefish in 1965 under his pen name, Robert Traver.
