= Faithorn, Michigan =

- Unincorporated community
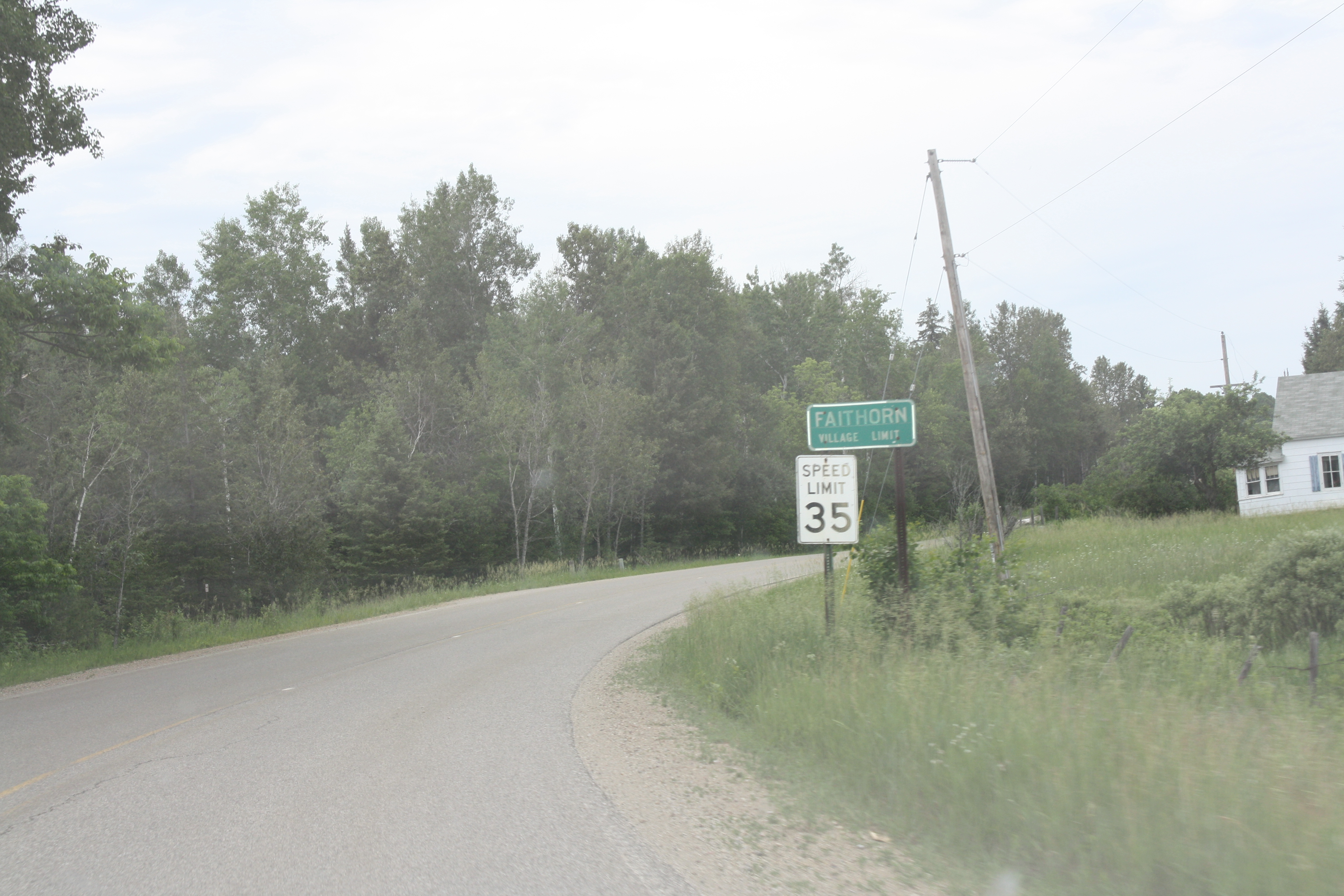
- Welcome sign to Faithorn

- Location within the state of Michigan Faithorn (the United States)
- Coordinates: 45°39′53″N 87°45′06″W
- Country: United States
- State: Michigan
- County: Menominee
- Township: Faithorn
- Elevation: 860 ft (260 m)
- Time zone: UTC-6 (Central (CST))
  - Summer (DST): UTC-5 (CDT)
- ZIP Code: 49892
- Area code: 906
- GNIS feature ID: 625807

Faithorn is an unincorporated community in Menominee County in the U.S. state of Michigan. It is located along County Road 577, approximately 1 mile (1.6 km) east of the state of Wisconsin.

== History ==
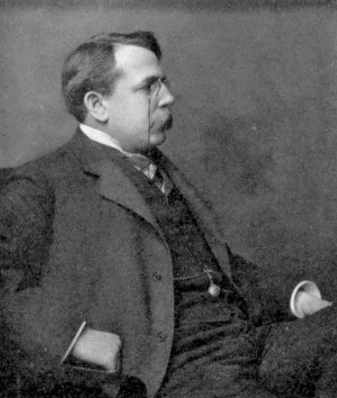
John Nicholson Faithorn

Faithorn began as a lumbering town and had a post office from 1903 or 1905 until 1955. It is named after the Chicago railroad baron, John Nicholson Faithorn (1852–1914)J who served as the president and general manager of the Chicago Terminal Transfer Railroad and was a key figure in the Chicago, Terre Haute & Southeastern Railway. (Note: He ran several railroads. And whose name appeared on "Faithorn jet" and the eponymous “Faithorn yard.” Situated near Crete, Illinois on the Illinois=Indian border, and close to the B&O property line, Faithorn Yard was a historic railroad yard located in Faithorn, Illinois. served as the northern terminus of the Milwaukee Road's "South Eastern" line on the Terre Haute Division. It was a key, now-defunct terminal for the Chicago, Terre Haute & Southeastern Railway, later acquired by the Milwaukee Road. It was active through the 1970s before being abandoned, per discussions on Trainorders.com.)

== Images ==
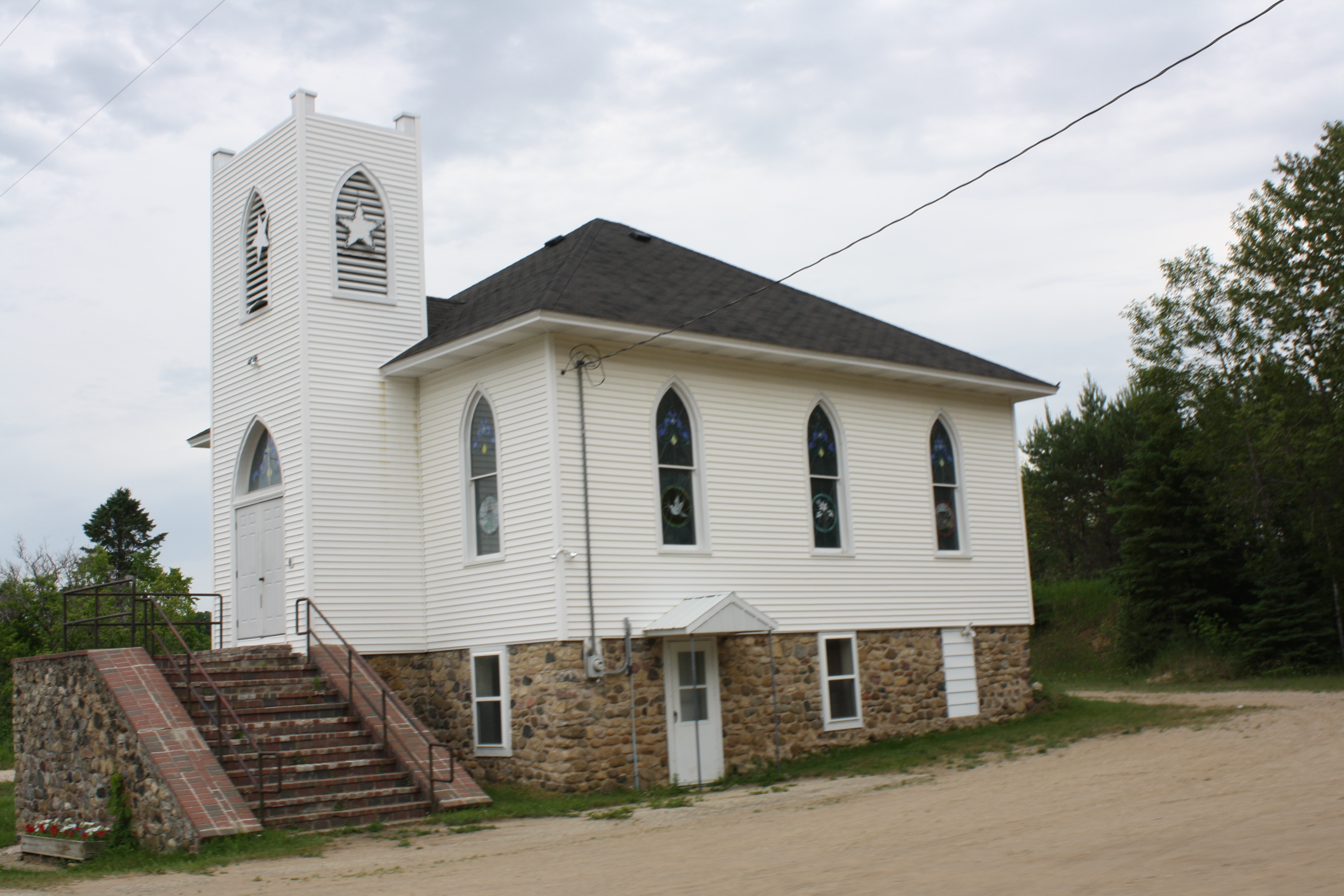
The Methodist Episcopal church in Faithorn, built in 1921
