= Faithorn Township, Michigan =

- Civil township
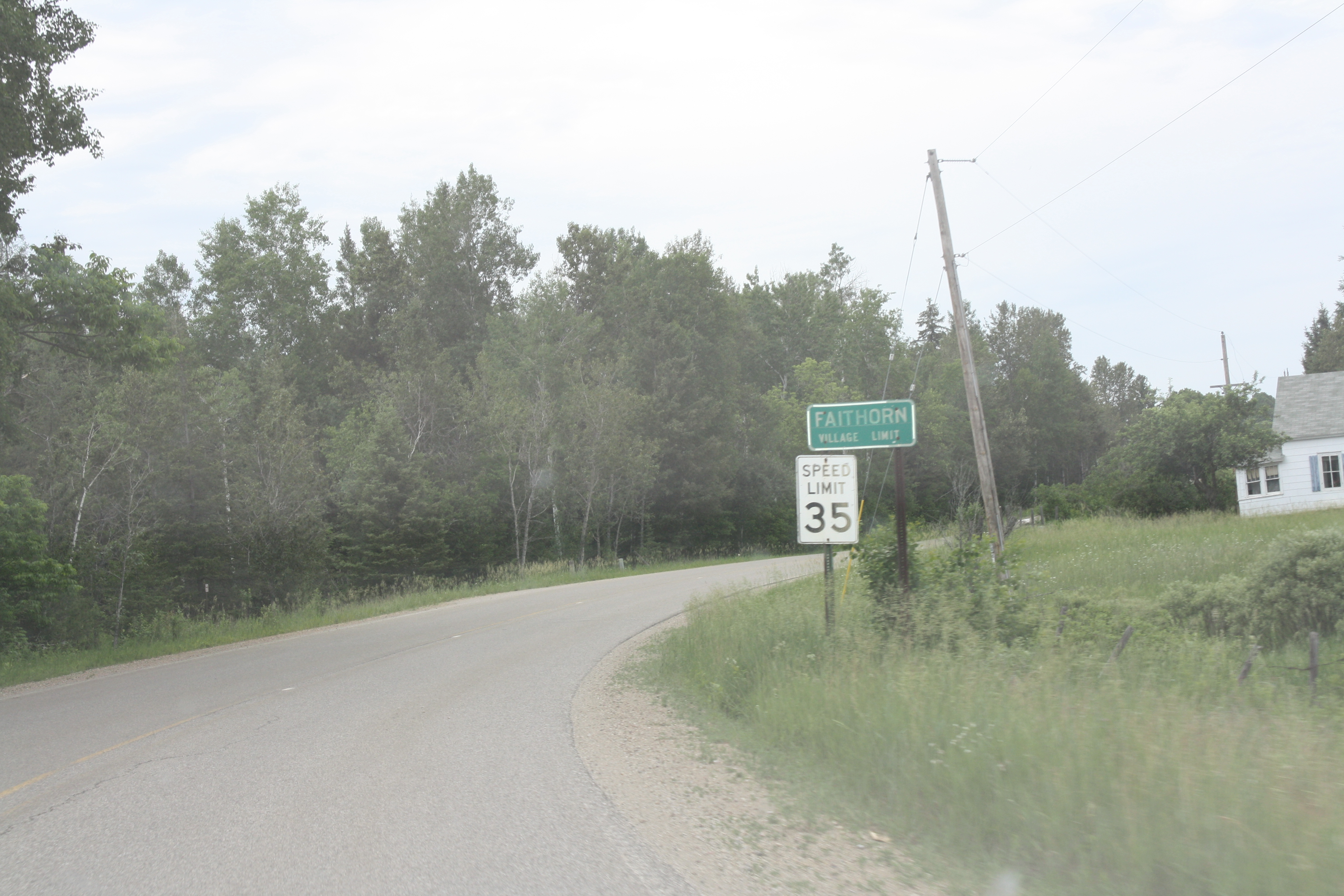
- Unincorporated community of Faithorn

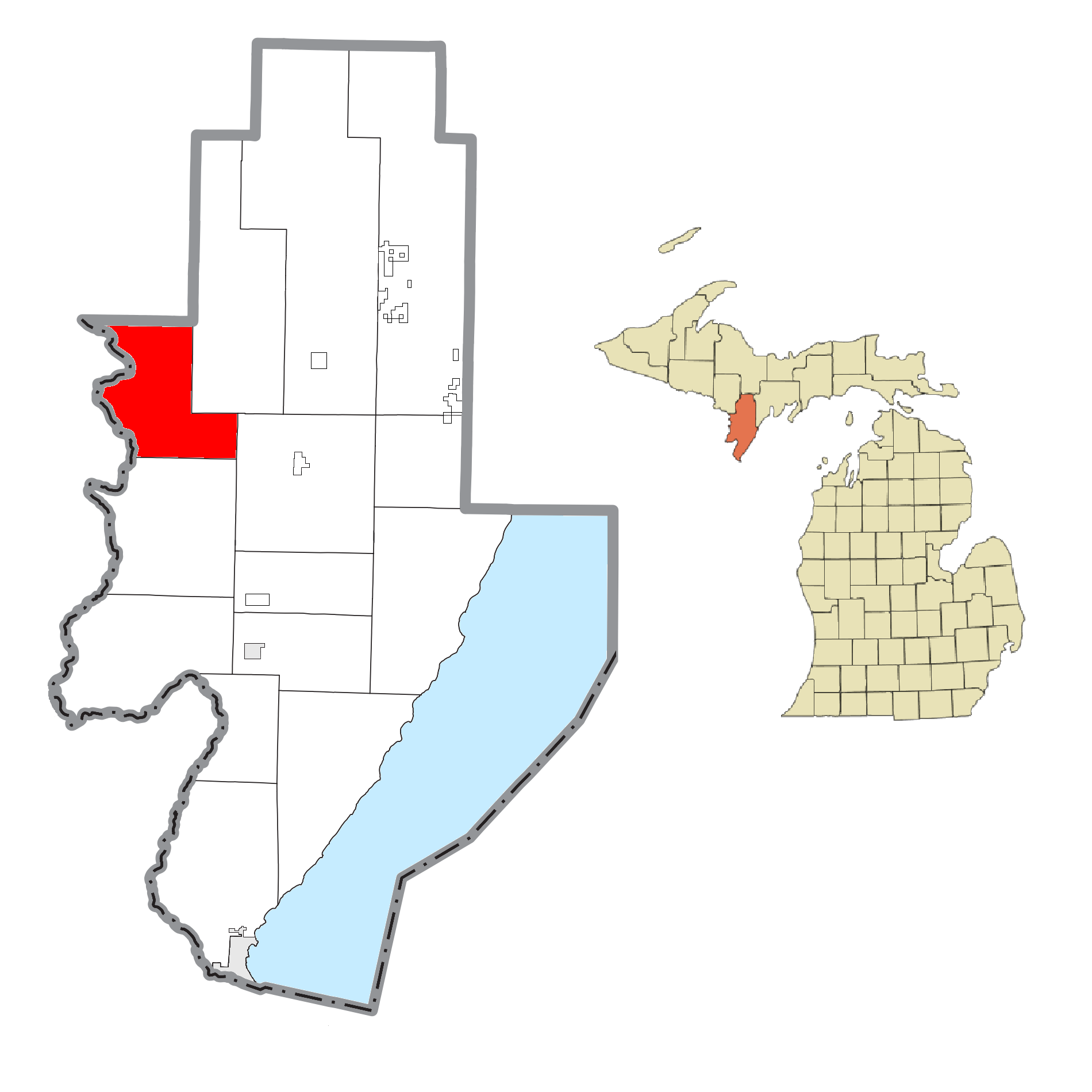
- Location within Menominee County and the state of Michigan

- Location within Michigan Location within the United States
- Coordinates: 45°39′53″N 87°45′06″W
- Country: United States
- State: Michigan
- County: Menominee

Area
  - Total: 54.24 sq mi (140.5 km^{2})
  - Land: 53.67 sq mi (139.0 km^{2})
  - Water: 0.57 sq mi (1.5 km^{2})
- Elevation: 856 ft (261 m)

Population (2020)
  - Total: 239
  - Density: 4.5/sq mi (1.7/km^{2})
- Time zone: UTC-6 (Central (CST))
  - Summer (DST): UTC-5 (CDT)
- ZIP code(s): 49892 (Vulcan), 49812 (Carney); 49821 (Daggett); 49847 (Hermansville)
- Area code: 906
- FIPS code: 26-109-27300
- GNIS feature ID: 1626268

Faithorn Township is a civil township of Menominee County in the U.S. state of Michigan. The population was 239 at the 2020 census.

== Geography ==
The township is in western Menominee County, bordered to the west, across the Menominee River, by Marinette County in the state of Wisconsin. Dickinson County, Michigan, is to the north. According to the United States Census Bureau, the township has a total area of 54.2 square miles (140 km^{2}), of which 53.7 square miles (139 km^{2}) are land and 0.6 square miles (1.6 km^{2}), or 1.05%, are water.

== Demographics ==
As of the census of 2000, there were 214 people, 91 households, and 63 families residing in the township. In 2020, there were 239 people in the township.

== History ==
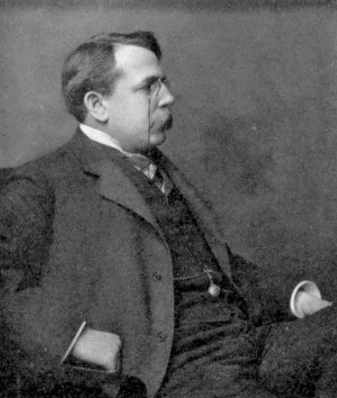
John Nicholson Faithorn

Faithorn began as a lumbering town and had a post office from 1903 or 1905 until 1955. It is named after the Chicago railroad baron, John Nicholson Faithorn (1852–1914) who served as the president and general manager of the Chicago Terminal Transfer Railroad and was a key figure in the Chicago, Terre Haute & Southeastern Railway. (Note: He ran several railroads. And whose name appeared on "Faithorn jet" and the eponymous “Faithorn yard.” Situated near Crete, Illinois on the Illinois-Indiana border, and close to the B&O property line, Faithorn Yard was a historic railroad yard located in Faithorn, Illinois. served as the northern terminus of the Milwaukee Road's "South Eastern" line on the Terre Haute Division. It was a key, now-defunct terminal for the Chicago, Terre Haute & Southeastern Railway, later acquired by the Milwaukee Road. It was active through the 1970s before being abandoned, per discussions on Trainorders.com.)

== Images ==
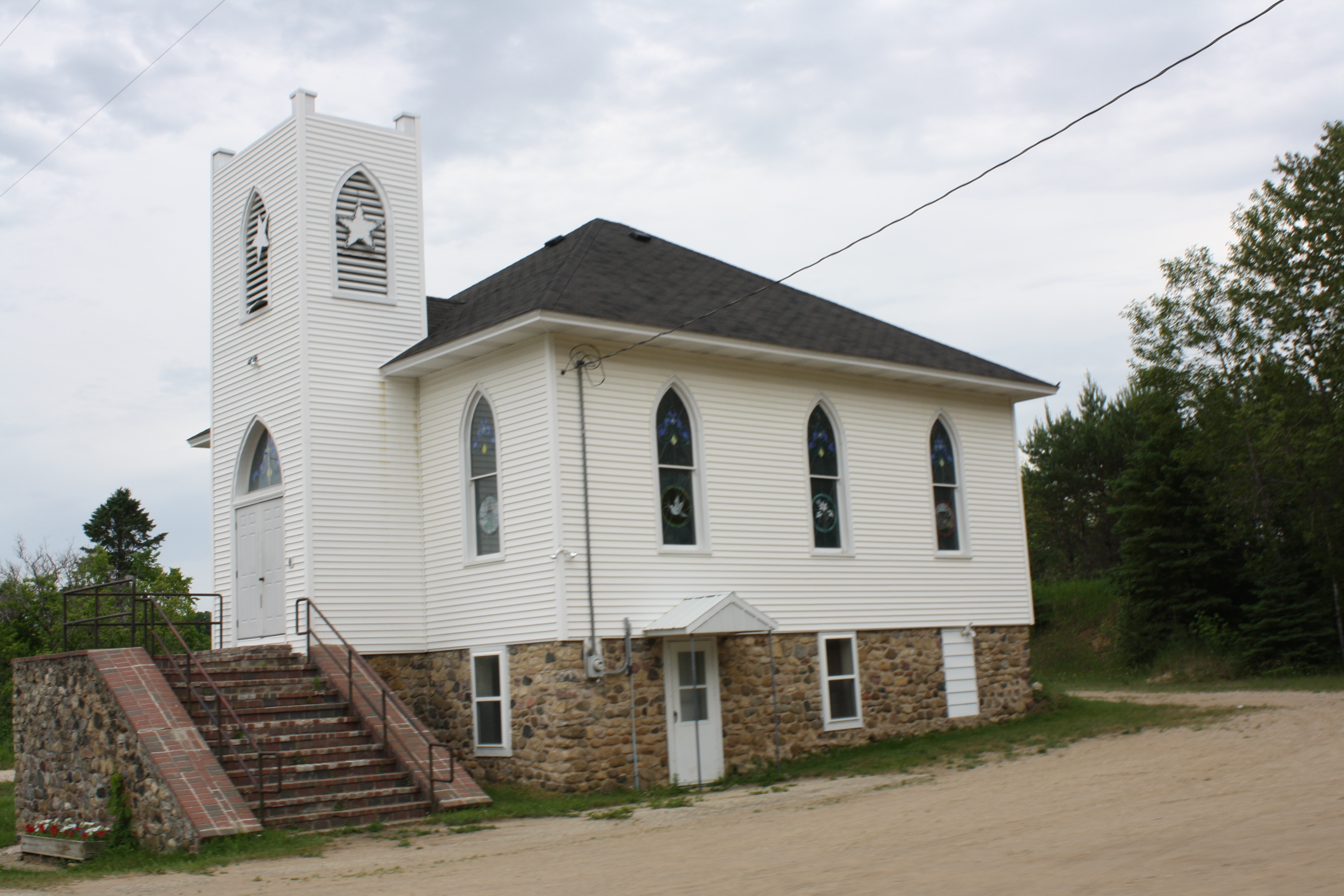
The Methodist Episcopal church in Faithorn, built in 1921
