= Wells State Park (Michigan) =

Park in Michigan, US

J.W. Wells State Park
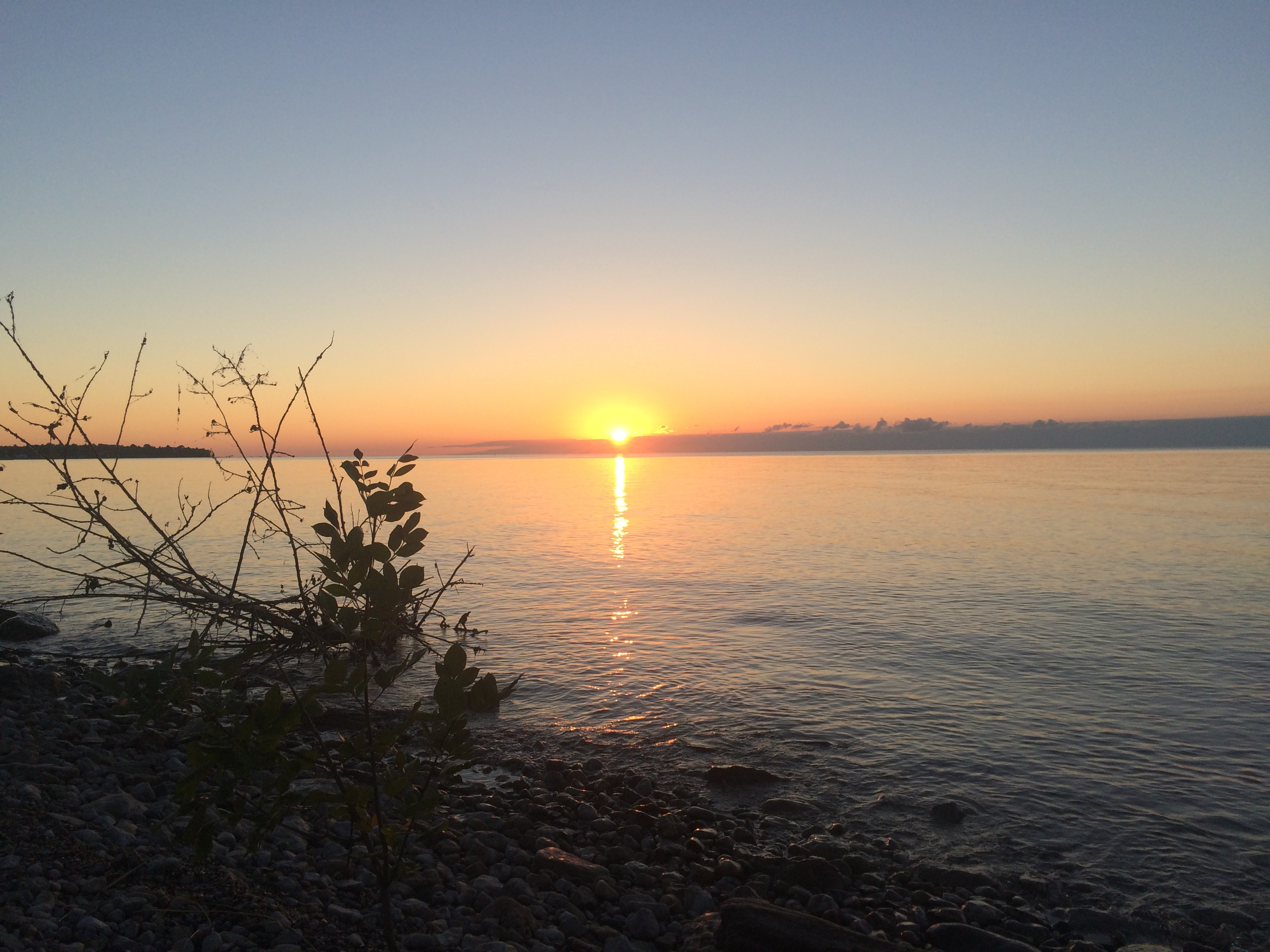
- Sunset at Wells State Park

- Location within Michigan Location within the United States
- Location: Cedarville Township, Menominee County, Michigan, United States
- Nearest city: Menominee, Michigan
- Coordinates: 45°24′06″N 87°22′19″W
- Area: 700 acres (280 ha)
- Elevation: 591 feet (180 m)
- Established: 1925
- Administrator: Michigan Department of Natural Resources
- Designation: Michigan state park
- Website: Official website
- J. W. Wells State Park
- U.S. National Register of Historic Places
- Built: 1927
- NRHP reference No.: 02000040
- Added to NRHP: February 25, 2002

J.W. Wells State Park (also known as Wells State Park) is a state park in the U.S. state of Michigan. The 678-acre (2.74 km^{2}) park is located in Menominee County on the shore of Lake Michigan's Green Bay, just south of Cedar River. It is on M-35, roughly midway between Menominee and Escanaba. It was added to the National Register of Historic Places in 2002.

== History ==
In 1898, Sam Crawford purchased fifty-three thousand acres of stumpland around Menominee and began logging operations on the hemlock growing among the pine stumps. Five hundred of these acres was still virgin timber, and Crawford intentionally preserved it. John Walter Wells, part owner of the Bird-Wells Lumber Company, later purchase this land. Wells died in 1921, and in 1925 his children donated 335 acres of virgin timber, including 2.5 miles of Lake Michigan shoreline, to the state of Michigan to establish a park. An additional 131 acres which had been purchased by the Menominee County Road Commission was added to create the park.

Development of the park began in 1927–28. Trees were planted and stoves, toilets, a well, and play equipment were installed. In 1929 a log bathhouse was constructed. Much of the development in the park was done by the Civilian Conservation Corps (CCC). In 1933, a two-hundred man camp was established, and over the next 10 years, the CCC developed five distinct areas within the park: the day-use (or picnic) area, the residence area, the group camp area, the campground area, and the trails and trailside shelters area. The CCC undertook a major reforestation project in the park, constructed three miles of foot trails, a parking lot, recreational fields, and sanitary facilities.

== Description ==
The J.W. Wells State Park contains 678 acres, of which the 335 acres of the original donation contains virgin timber. The park can be separated into five distinct sections: the day-use area, the residence area, the group camp area, the campground area, and the trails area. The day-use area contains directional and entrance signs, an informational kiosk, the parking lot, baseball and softball diamonds, combination picnic shelter/toilet building, and pump house. The residence area contains the park superintendent's residence and an icehouse. The group camp area contains the CCC era rustic cabins, the play area, kiosk, and fire ring. The campground area contains entry posts, combination toilet/shower/laundry building, pump house, kiosk, drainage ditch, and pit toilets. The trails area contains the Bayshore Trail (now known as the Cedar Rives Trail) with two shelters, and the Ridgewood Trail with a third shelter.

Many of the buildings and structures in these areas were constructed by the CCC using a combination of local materials: limestone, granite, and native timber. Many of the buildings have similar designs aspects, including asymmetrical designs, the use of stone for foundations and walls, multi-pane wood sash windows, exposed log trusses, and wood shingle exteriors and roofs.

== Activities and amenities ==
The state park offers swimming, picnicking, fishing, a 150-site campground and cabins, and seven miles of hiking trails.
