= Rachel A. Henderson =

American politician

The Honorable

Member of the Maine House of Representatives from the 78th district
- Incumbent
- Assumed office December 7, 2022
- Preceded by: Cathy Nadeau

Personal details
- Party: Republican
- Profession: Sales management

Rachel Ann Henderson is an American politician who has served as a member of the Maine House of Representatives since December 7, 2022. She represents Maine's 78th House district.

== Electoral history ==
She was elected on November 8, 2022, in the 2022 Maine House of Representatives election and assumed office on December 7, 2022.

Maine House of Representatives
Preceded by Cathy Nadeau	Member of the Maine House of Representatives; 2022–present	Succeeded by incumbent
