= Catherine Nadeau =

American politician

Former member Maine House of Representatives
- In office December 4, 2012 – December 1, 2020
- Preceded by: Susan Morissette
- Succeeded by: Cathy Nadeau
- Constituency: 54th district (2012-2014); 78th district (2014-2020)

Personal details
- Born: June 23, 1958 (age 68)
- Party: Democratic
- Education: Winslow High School, Maine Medical Center School of Surgical Technology

Catherine Nadeau (born June 23, 1958) is an American politician from Winslow, Maine.

== Political career ==
Nadeau has served on the Winslow town council, and in the Maine House of Representatives. She represented Maine's 54th district from 2012 to 2014, and Maine's 78th district from 2014 to 2020. During the 2019-2020 legislative session Nadeau served as chair of the Inland Fisheries and Wildlife Committee. While in office Nadeau advocated for small businesses

== Election History ==
General election for Maine House of Representatives District 78, 2018
Party	Candidate	Votes	%
Democratic	Catherine Nadeau	2,153	55.6%
Republican	Benjamin Twitchell	1,717	44.4%

General election for Maine House of Representatives District 78, 2016
Party	Candidate	Votes	%
Democratic	Catherine Nadeau	2,400	51.6%
Republican	Benjamin Twitchell	2,250	48.4%

General election for Maine House of Representatives District 78, 2014
Party	Candidate	Votes	%
Democratic	Catherine Nadeau	2,233	55%
Republican	Susan Morissette	1,695	41.7%
None	Blank Votes	134	3.3%

General election for Maine House of Representatives District 54, 2012
Party	Candidate	Votes	%
Democratic	Catherine Nadeau	2,248	50.6%
Republican	Susan Morissette	2,196	49.4%

General election for Maine House of Representatives District 54, 2010
Party	Candidate	Votes	%
Republican	Susan Morissette	1,978	51%
Democratic	Catherine Nadeau	1,729	44%
