= Brian Nadeau =

American politician

Member of New Hampshire House of Representatives for Rockingham County's 4th district
- Incumbent
- Assumed office December 4, 2024
- Preceded by: Tim Cahill, Mike Drago

Personal details
- Party: Republican

Brian Nadeau is an American politician. He is a member of the New Hampshire House of Representatives. In the 2024 election he was endorsed by Americans for Prosperity.
