= Escanaba River State Forest =

State Forest in Alger, Marquette, and Menominee counties, Michigan

- Map showing state forests in Michigan

- Location within Michigan Location within the United States
- Location: Upper Peninsula, Michigan
- Coordinates: 46.15°N 87.19°W
- Governing body: Michigan Department of Natural Resources

Escanaba River State Forest is a state forest in the central Upper Peninsula of Michigan. It includes forested lands in Alger, Delta, Marquette, and Menominee Counties. The forest is operated by the Michigan Department of Natural Resources.

Like other Michigan state forests, Escanaba River is made up of clear cut parcels of forest land that were seen by their owners as worthless after the old-growth timber had been cut. The parcels reverted to the state of Michigan in lieu of unpaid property taxes. The state reorganized these parcels of property as the Escanaba River State Forest. The forest is now managed for active recreational purposes such as hiking, canoeing, fishing, hunting, and the cutting of second-growth wood for paper pulp.

The small city of Escanaba continues to this day as a nationwide center of groundwood papermaking, and uses pulpwood from the Escanaba River State Forest and from other public and private landowners.
