= Tim Cahill (New Hampshire politician) =

American politician

Member of the New Hampshire House of Representatives from the Rockingham 4th district
- In office December 7, 2022 – December 4, 2024
- Succeeded by: Brian Nadeau, Cindy Bennett

Personal details
- Party: Republican

Tim Cahill is an American politician. He served as a Republican member for the Rockingham 4th district of the New Hampshire House of Representatives.

Tim Cahill was named to President Donald J. Trump's New Hampshire Leadership Team for the 2024 Presidential Election.
