= Nadeau Township, Michigan =

- Civil township
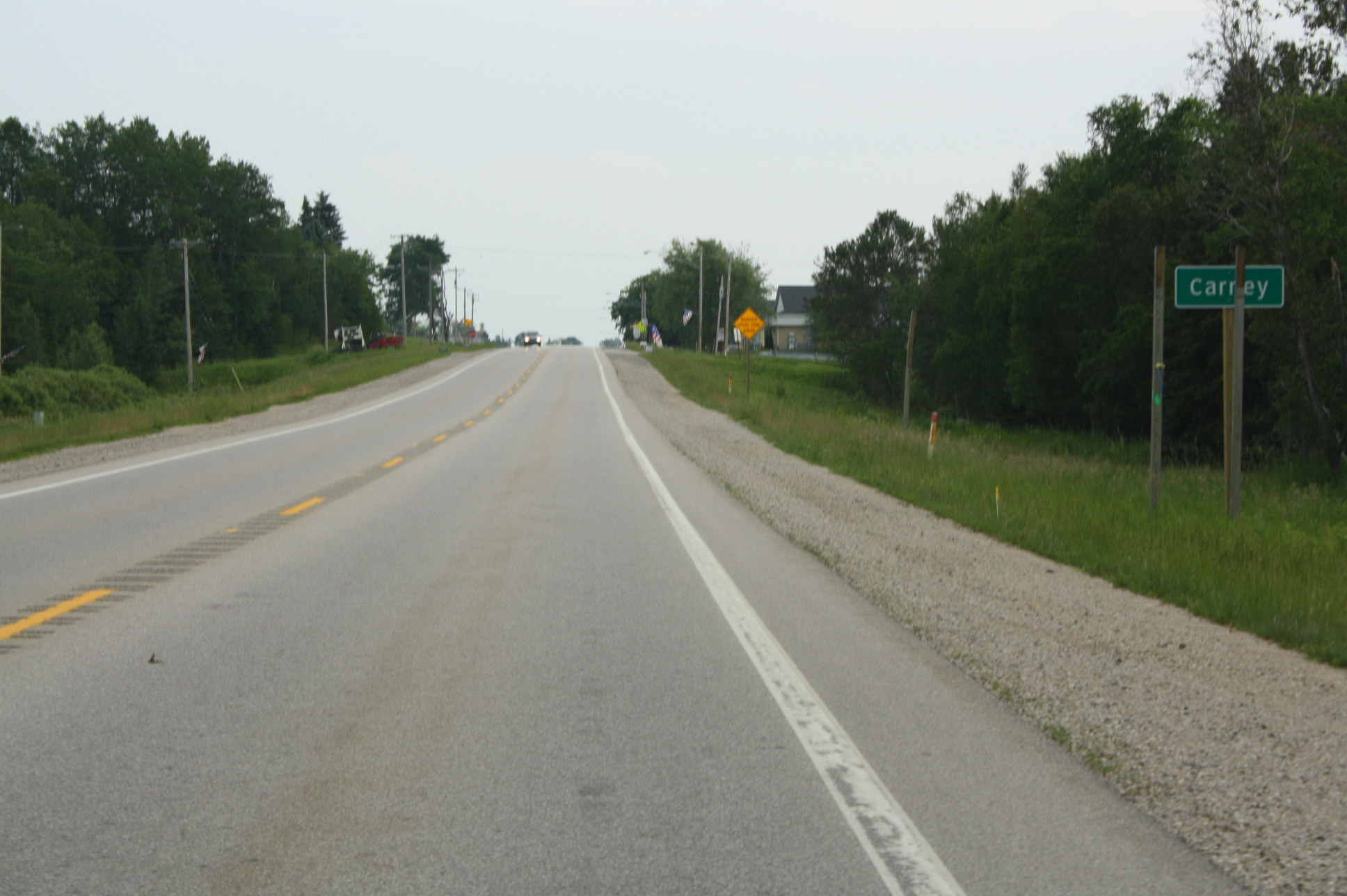
- Village of Carney along U.S. Route 41

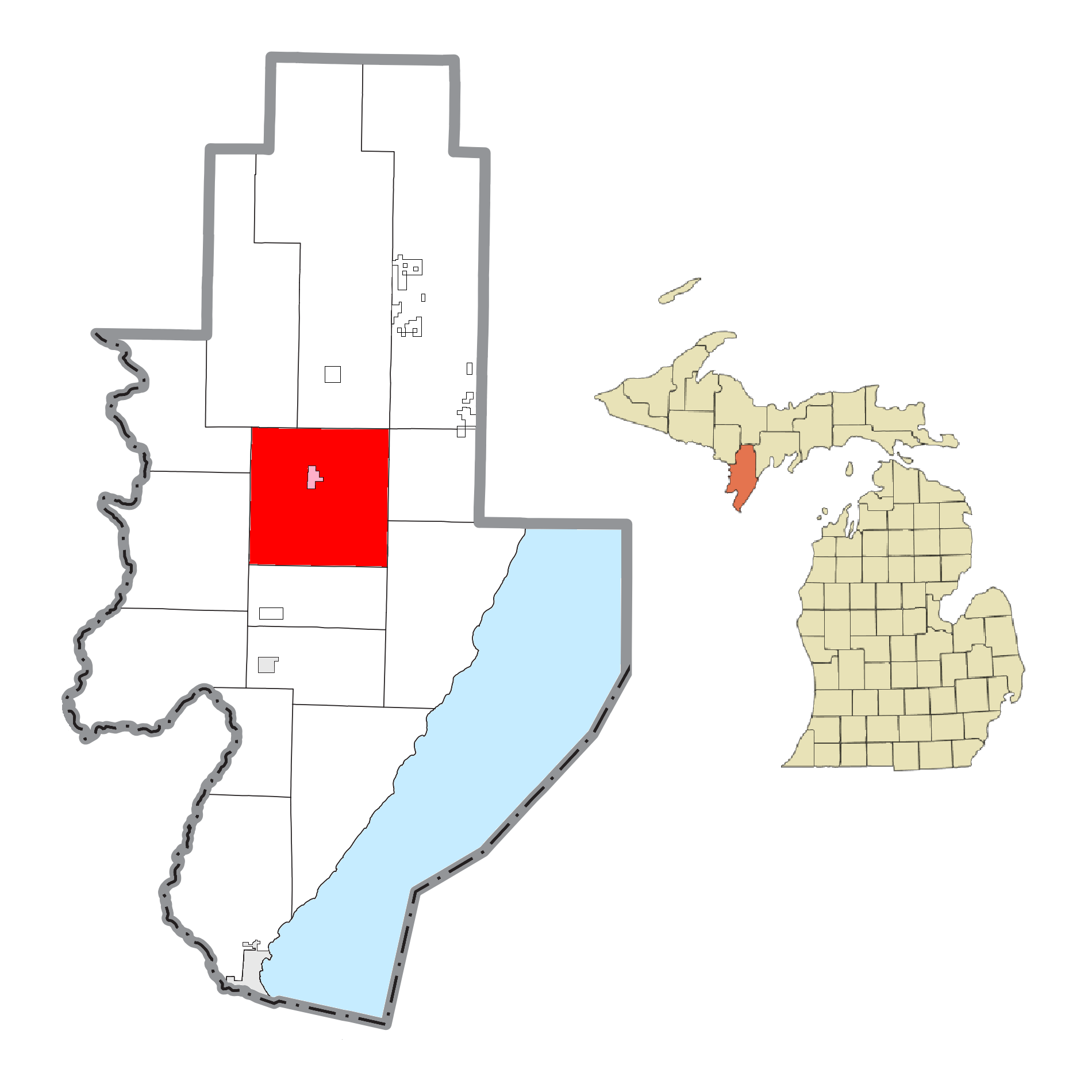
- Location within Menominee County (red) and the state of Michigan; administered village of Carney in pink

- Location within Michigan Location within the United States
- Coordinates: 45°34′48″N 87°33′48″W
- Country: United States
- State: Michigan
- County: Menominee

Area
  - Total: 80.86 sq mi (209.4 km^{2})
  - Land: 80.80 sq mi (209.3 km^{2})
  - Water: 0.06 sq mi (0.16 km^{2})
- Elevation: 778 ft (237 m)

Population (2020)
  - Total: 1,090
  - Density: 13.5/sq mi (5.2/km^{2})
- Time zone: UTC-6 (Central (CST))
  - Summer (DST): UTC-5 (CDT)
- ZIP Codes: 49812 (Carney); 49821 (Daggett); 49863 (Nadeau)
- Area code: 906
- FIPS code: 26-109-56440
- GNIS feature ID: 1626787
- Website: nadeautownship.org

Nadeau Township is a civil township of Menominee County in the U.S. state of Michigan. The population was 1,090 at the 2020 census.

== Geography ==
Nadeau Township is in central Menominee County, 7 miles (11 km) south of Powers and 34 miles (55 km) north of Menominee, the county seat. U.S. Route 41 crosses the township, passing through Carney and connecting Powers and Menominee.

According to the U.S. Census Bureau, the township has a total area of 80.9 square miles (210 km^{2}), of which 0.1 square miles (0.3 km^{2}), or 0.07%, is water.

== Communities ==
- Carney is a village within the township. The Carney ZIP code, 49812, serves most of the northern part of the township.
- Nadeau is an unincorporated community in the township north of Carney on US 41 at 45°36′32″N 87°33′10″W. Both the community and the township were named after Bruno (Barney) Nadeau, who owned the first farm in the area. The Chicago and North Western Railway built a station in 1878. A post office named "Nadean" was established on May 29, 1878, with Bruno (Barney) Nadeau as the first postmaster. The misspelled name of the post office was not corrected until February 20, 1890. The Nadeau post office, with ZIP code 49863, provides service for a small area surrounding the community.

== Demographics ==
Historical population
Census	Pop.	Note	%±
1890	1,525		—
1900	2,003		31.3%
1910	1,918		−4.2%
1920	1,861		−3.0%
1930	1,525		−18.1%
1940	1,680		10.2%
1950	1,572		−6.4%
1960	1,403		−10.8%
1970	1,084		−22.7%
1980	1,219		12.5%
1990	1,161		−4.8%
2000	1,160		−0.1%
2010	1,161		0.1%
2020	1,090		−6.1%
U.S. Decennial Census

As of the census of 2000, there were 1,160 people, 480 households, and 314 families residing in the township. By 2020, its population was 1,090.
