= Cathy Nadeau =

American politician

Member of the Maine House of Representatives from the 78th district district
- In office December 1, 2020 – December 6, 2022
- Preceded by: Catherine Nadeau
- Succeeded by: Rachel Ann Henderson

Personal details
- Party: Republican
- Education: Winslow High School
- Alma mater: Thomas College

Cathy Nadeau is an American politician from Winslow, Maine.

== Personal life ==
Nadeau worked for the Winslow town office in the 1980s as a tax collector, and assistant treasurer.

== Political career ==
Nadeau served in the Maine House of Representatives. She represented Maine's 78th district for one term from 2020 to 2022 and did not run for re-election.

== Electoral History ==
General election for Maine House of Representatives District 78, 2020
Party	Candidate	Votes	%
Republican	Cathy Nadeau	2,782	55.8%
Democratic	Raymond Caron	2,200	44.2%
