= Nadeau, Michigan =

- Unincorporated community
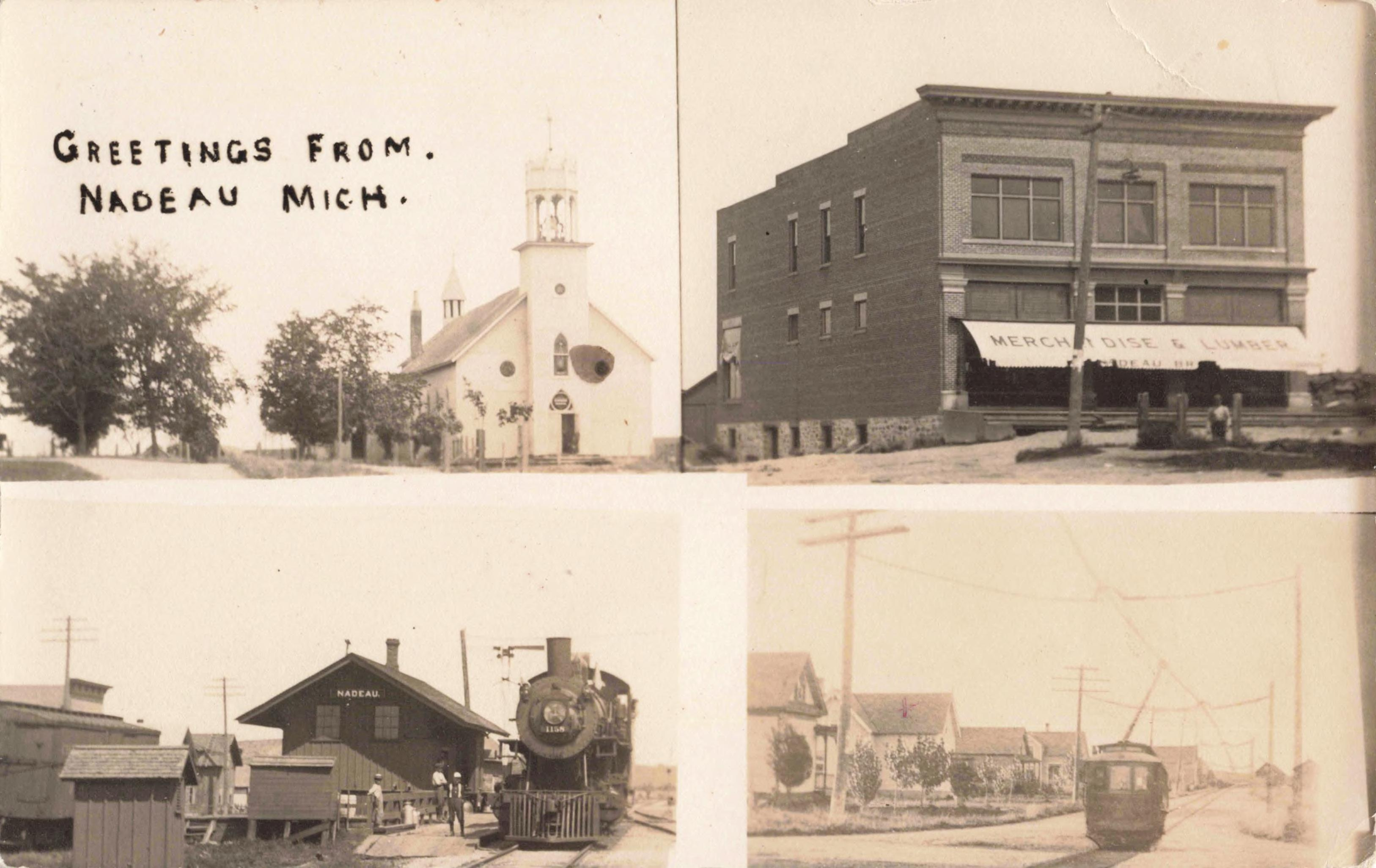
- Scenes in Nadeau, Michigan, 1911

- Location within the state of Michigan
- Coordinates: 45°36′32″N 87°33′10″W
- Country: United States
- State: Michigan
- County: Menominee
- Township: Nadeau
- Elevation: 827 ft (252 m)
- Time zone: UTC-6 (Central (CST))
  - Summer (DST): UTC-5 (CDT)
- ZIP code(s): 49863
- Area code: 906
- GNIS feature ID: 633202

Nadeau is an unincorporated community in Menominee County, Michigan, United States. Nadeau is located in Nadeau Township along US Highway 41 and the Canadian National Railway, 1.5 miles (2.4 km) north of Carney. Nadeau has a post office with ZIP code 49863.

== History ==
Nadeau was settled as a farm owned by Barney Nadeau. In 1878, the Chicago and North Western Railway opened a station in the community. A post office opened in Nadeau under the name Nadean, with Barney Nadeau serving as postmaster; the name was corrected to Nadeau on February 20, 1890.

== Images ==
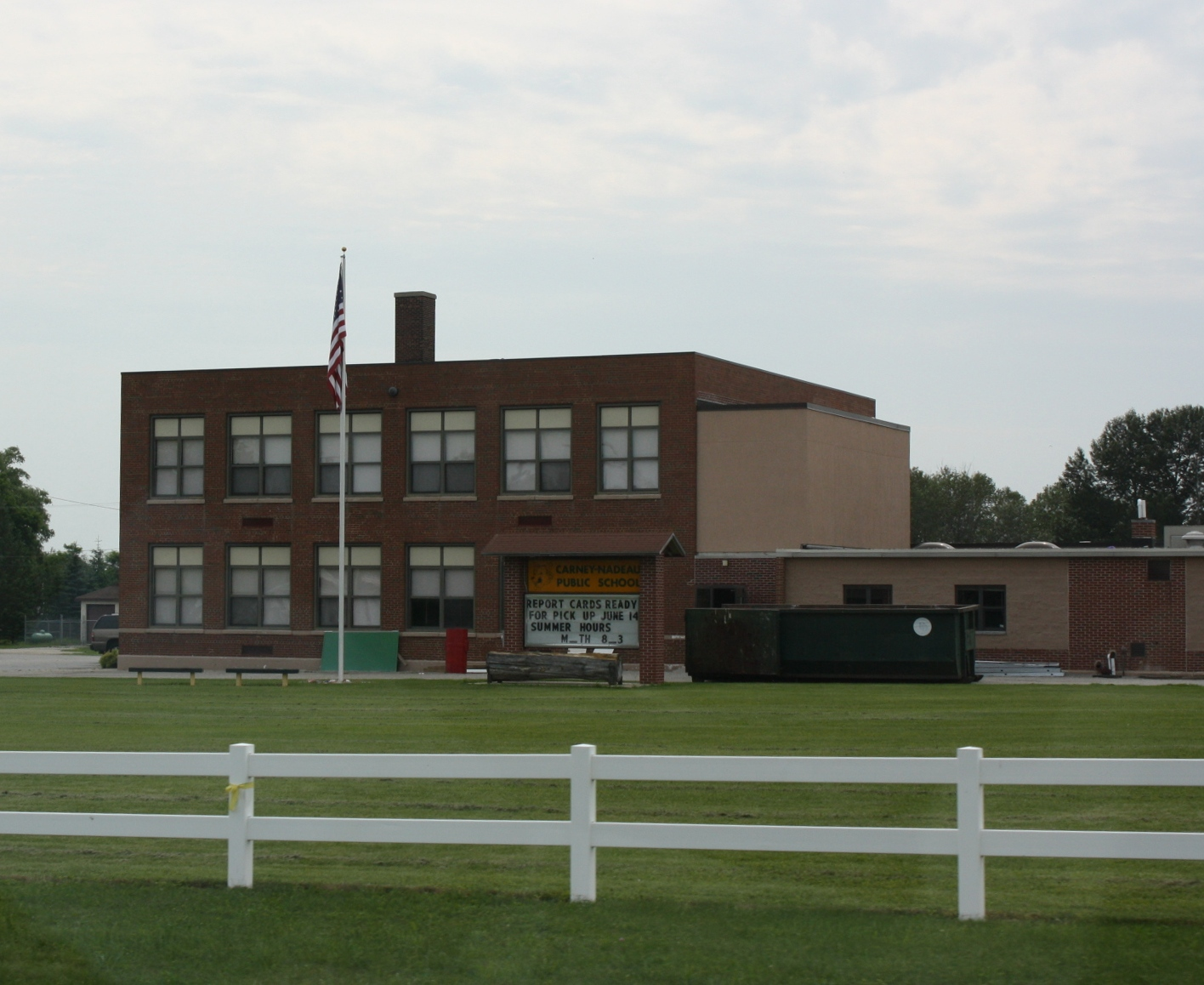
Carney/Nadeau School

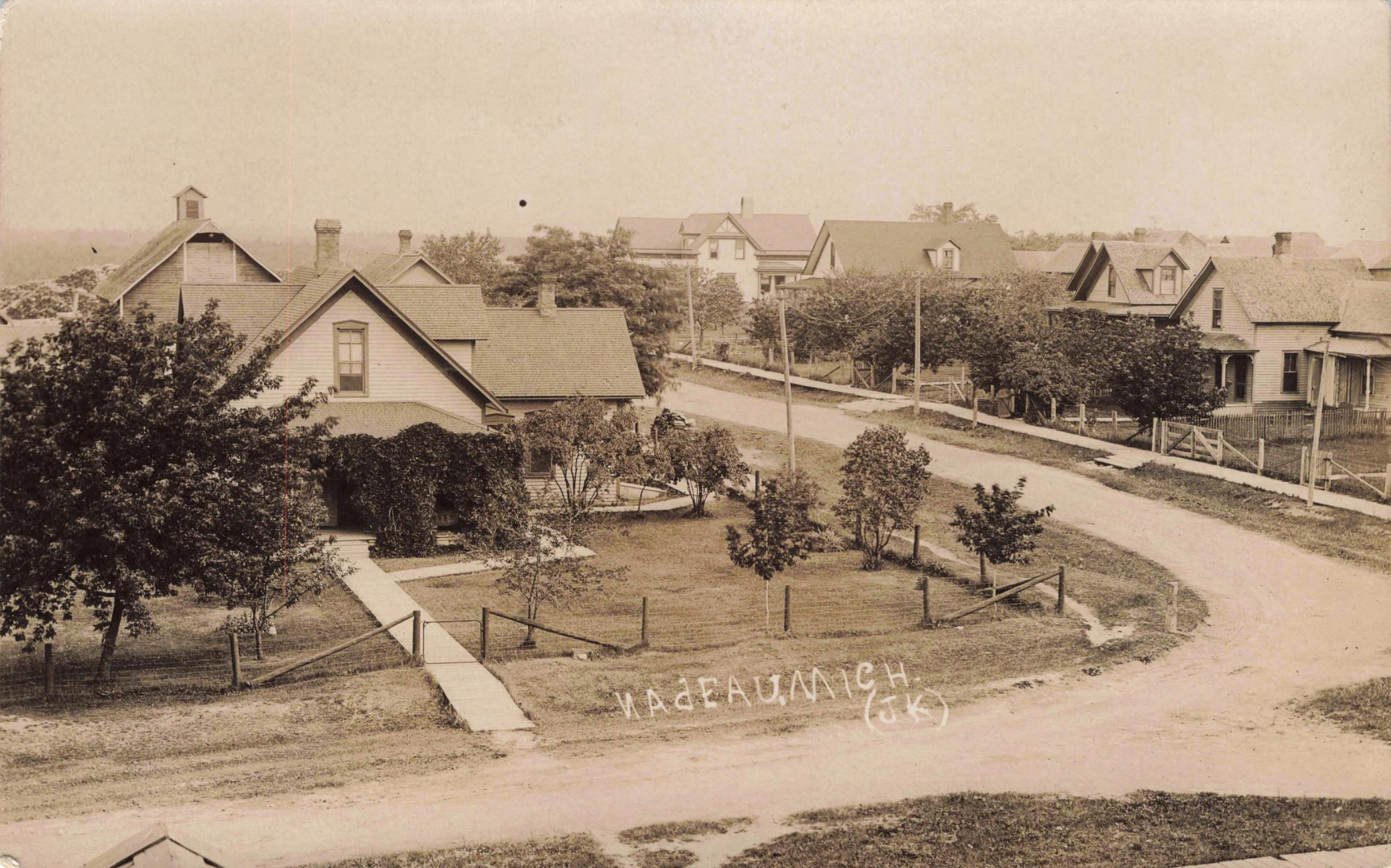
Houses in Nadeau, 1909

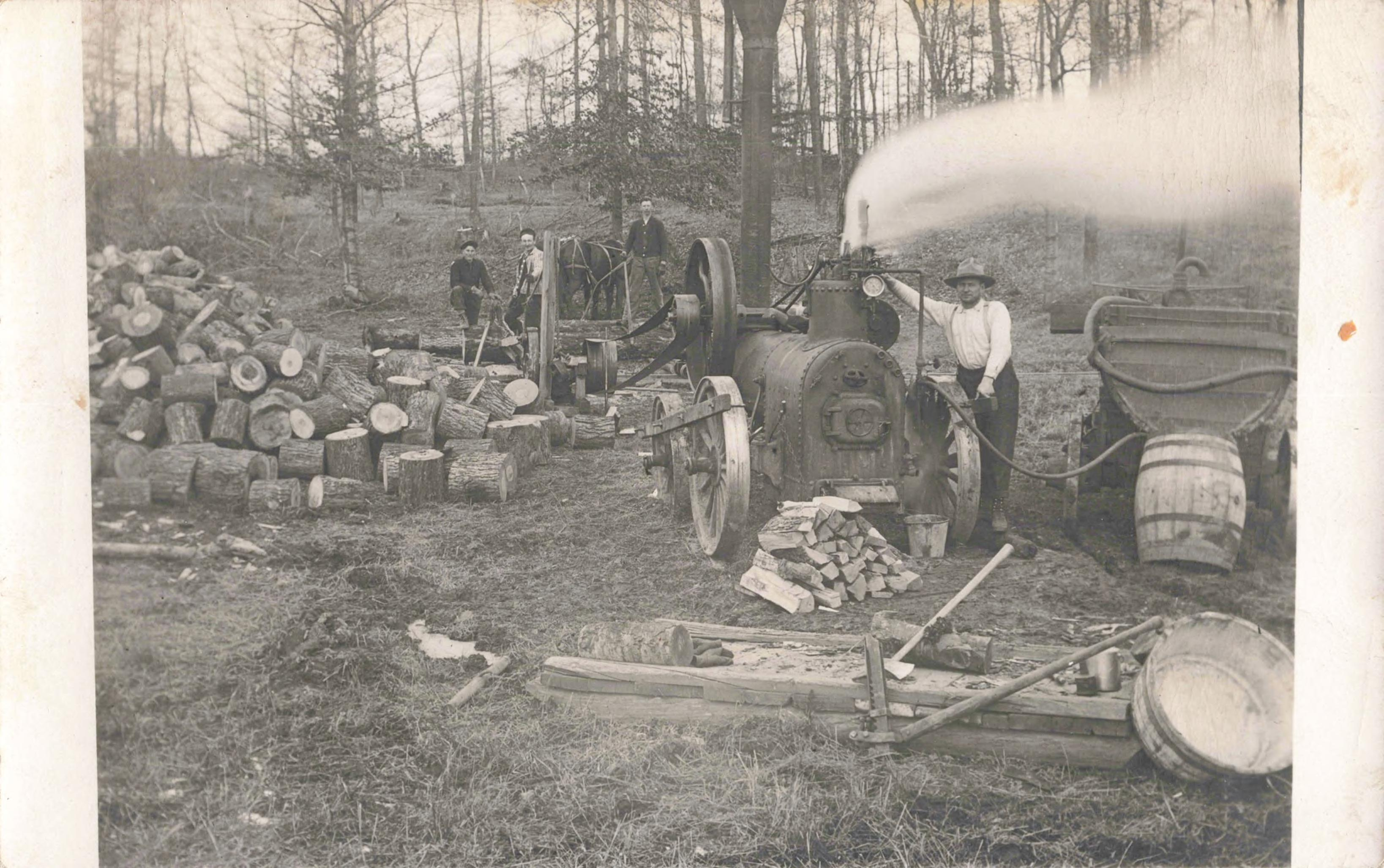
Logging in Nadeau, 1911
