= Menominee County, Michigan =

County in Michigan, United States

- County
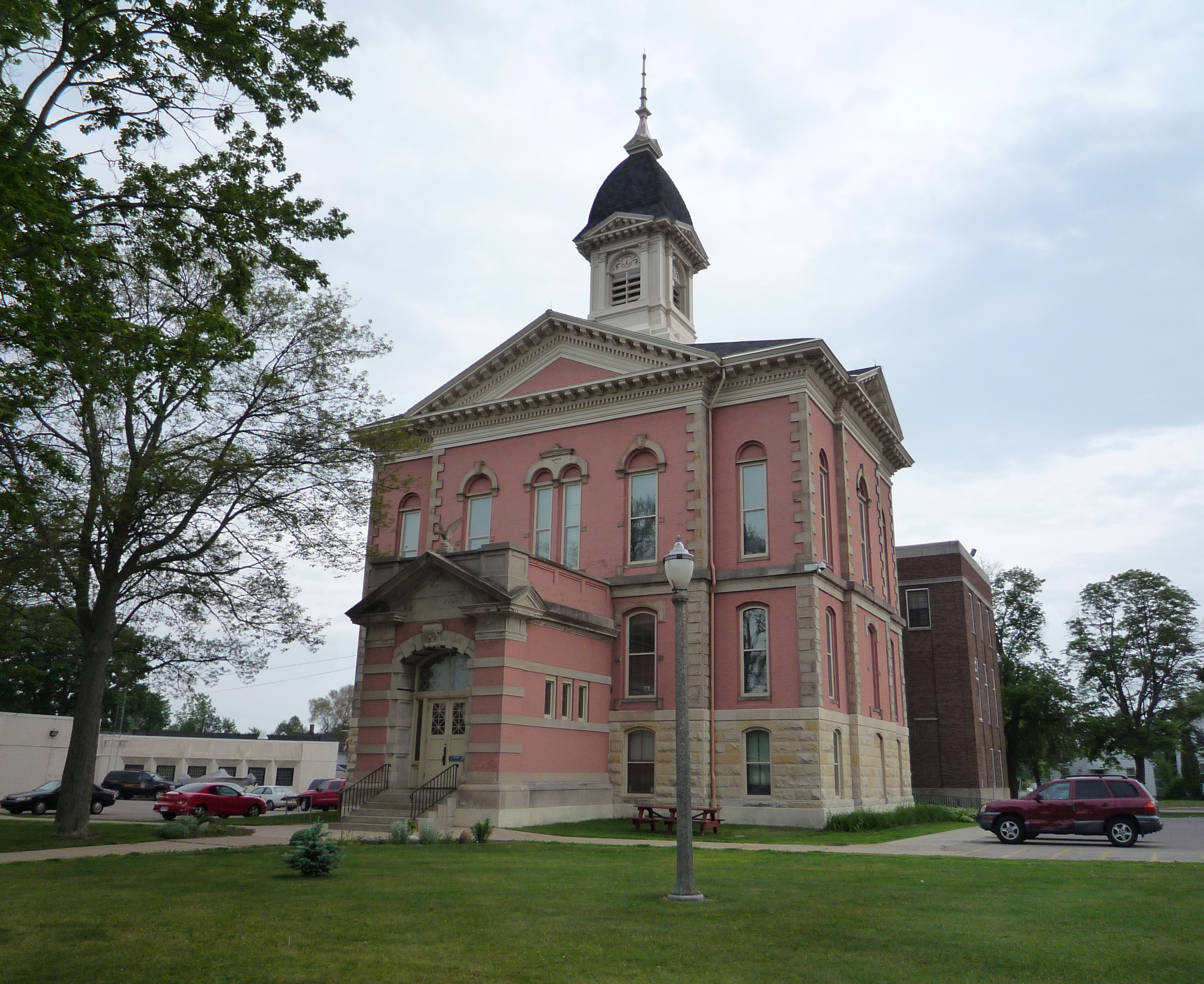
- Menominee County Courthouse, Menominee

- Location within the U.S. state of Michigan
- Coordinates: 45°31′N 87°32′W
- Country: United States
- State: Michigan
- Established: 1861
- Organized: 1863
- Named for: Menominee tribe
- Seat: Menominee
- Largest city: Menominee

Area
  - Total: 1,338 sq mi (3,470 km^{2})
  - Land: 1,044 sq mi (2,700 km^{2})
  - Water: 294 sq mi (760 km^{2}) 22%

Population (2020)
  - Total: 23,502
  - Estimate (2025): 22,941 ▼
  - Density: 23/sq mi (8.9/km^{2})
- Time zone: UTC−6 (Central)
  - Summer (DST): UTC−5 (CDT)
- Congressional district: 1st
- Website: menomineecounty.com

Menominee County (/məˈnɒməni/ mə-NAH-mə-nee) is a county located in the Upper Peninsula in the U.S. state of Michigan. As of the 2020 census, the population was 23,502. The county seat is Menominee. The county's name comes from an Ojibwe word meaning "wild rice eater" used to describe the Menominee people. The county was created in 1861 from the area partitioned out of Delta County, under the name of Bleeker. When the county government was organized in 1863, the name was changed to Menominee.

Menominee County is part of the Marinette, WI–MI micropolitan statistical area.

== Geography ==
According to the U.S. Census Bureau, the county has a total area of 1,338 square miles (3,470 km^{2}), of which 1,044 square miles (2,700 km^{2}) is land and 294 square miles (760 km^{2}) (22%) is water.

=== Major highways ===
- US 2 – enters west line of county from Dickinson County. Runs E to intersection with US 41 at Powers.
- US 41 – runs north from S tip of county to Powers, then E through Wilson and Indiantown into Delta County.
- M-35 – runs NE from Menominee along edge of Green Bay, into Delta County.
- M-69 – runs NW-SE through northern part of county. Passes Labranche, Whitney, and Perronville.

=== Airport ===
- Menominee–Marinette Twin County Airport (ICAO: KMNM) - in NW Menominee, is a public-owned public-use general-aviation airport.

=== Adjacent counties ===
By land

- Dickinson County (northwest)
- Marquette County (north, Eastern Time Zone border)
- Delta County (northeast, Eastern Time Zone border)

By the Menominee River

- Marinette County, Wisconsin (west)

By Green Bay

- Door County, Wisconsin (east)

== Communities ==
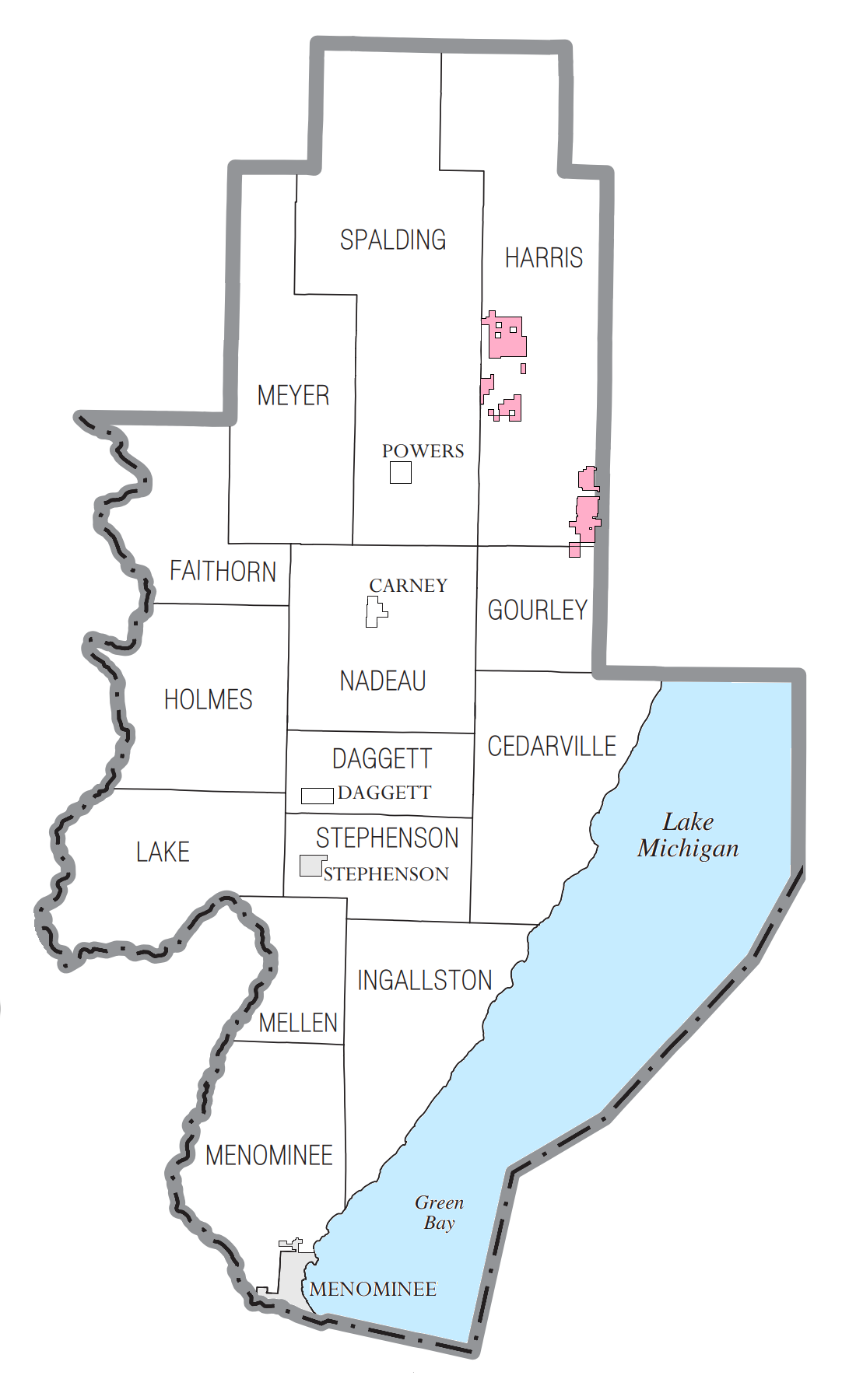
U.S. Census data map showing local municipal boundaries within Menominee County. Gray shaded areas represent incorporated cities, and pink shaded areas represent reservations of the Hannahville Indian Community.

=== Cities ===
- Menominee (county seat)
- Stephenson

=== Villages ===
- Carney
- Daggett
- Powers

=== Civil townships ===
- Cedarville Township
- Daggett Township
- Faithorn Township
- Gourley Township
- Harris Township
- Holmes Township
- Ingallston Township
- Lake Township
- Mellen Township
- Menominee Township
- Meyer Township
- Nadeau Township
- Spalding Township
- Stephenson Township

=== Census-designated place ===
- Hermansville

=== Unincorporated communities ===
- Birch Creek
- Cedar River
- Cunard
- Eagles Nest
- Faithorn
- Harris
- Hannahville
- Hermansville
- Indiantown
- Ingalls
- Labranche
- Leapers
- Nadeau
- Perronville
- Wallace
- Whitney
- Wilson

=== Indian reservations ===
- The Hannahville Indian Community occupies several scattered territories within Menominee County, mostly within Harris Township and a small piece extending into Gourley Township. Another smaller piece extends east into neighboring Bark River Township in Delta County.

== Demographics ==
Historical population
Census	Pop.	Note	%±
1870	1,791		—
1880	11,987		569.3%
1890	33,639		180.6%
1900	27,046		−19.6%
1910	25,648		−5.2%
1920	23,778		−7.3%
1930	23,652		−0.5%
1940	24,883		5.2%
1950	25,299		1.7%
1960	24,685		−2.4%
1970	24,587		−0.4%
1980	26,201		6.6%
1990	24,920		−4.9%
2000	25,326		1.6%
2010	24,029		−5.1%
2020	23,502		−2.2%
2025 (est.)	22,941	▼	−2.4%
US Decennial Census; 1790-1960 1900-1990; 1990-2000 2010-2018

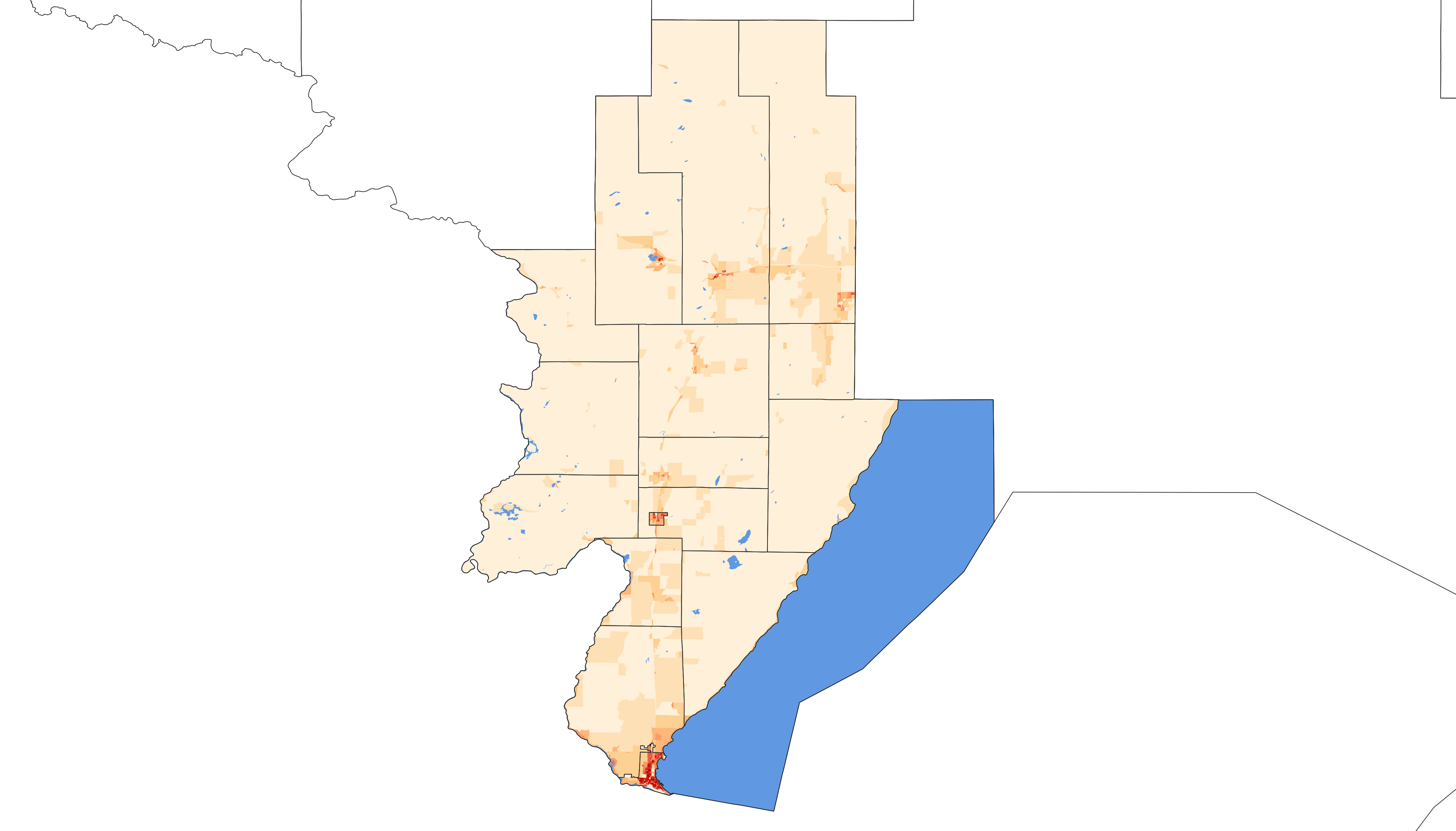
2020 population density of Menominee County MI by census block

=== Racial and ethnic composition ===
Menominee County, Michigan – Racial and ethnic composition Note: the US Census treats Hispanic/Latino as an ethnic category. This table excludes Latinos from the racial categories and assigns them to a separate category. Hispanics/Latinos may be of any race.
Race / Ethnicity (NH = Non-Hispanic)	Pop 1980	Pop 1990	Pop 2000	Pop 2010	Pop 2020	% 1980	% 1990	% 2000	% 2010	% 2020
White alone (NH)	25,777	24,413	24,270	22,715	21,325	98.38%	97.97%	95.83%	94.53%	90.74%
Black or African American alone (NH)	6	7	25	68	98	0.02%	0.03%	0.10%	0.28%	0.42%
Native American or Alaska Native alone (NH)	307	382	552	619	727	1.17%	1.53%	2.18%	2.58%	3.09%
Asian alone (NH)	36	58	54	70	94	0.14%	0.23%	0.21%	0.29%	0.40%
Native Hawaiian or Pacific Islander alone (NH)	x	x	1	8	5	x	x	0.00%	0.03%	0.02%
Other race alone (NH)	17	1	8	6	33	0.06%	0.00%	0.03%	0.02%	0.14%
Mixed race or Multiracial (NH)	x	x	226	265	734	x	x	0.89%	1.10%	3.12%
Hispanic or Latino (any race)	58	59	190	278	486	0.22%	0.24%	0.75%	1.16%	2.07%
Total	26,201	24,920	25,326	24,029	23,502	100.00%	100.00%	100.00%	100.00%	100.00%

=== 2020 census ===
As of the 2020 census, the county had a population of 23,502. The median age was 49.4 years. 18.5% of residents were under the age of 18 and 25.3% of residents were 65 years of age or older. For every 100 females there were 104.7 males, and for every 100 females age 18 and over there were 102.8 males age 18 and over.

The racial makeup of the county was 91.5% White, 0.5% Black or African American, 3.2% American Indian and Alaska Native, 0.4% Asian, <0.1% Native Hawaiian and Pacific Islander, 0.6% from some other race, and 3.9% from two or more races. Hispanic or Latino residents of any race comprised 2.1% of the population.

36.8% of residents lived in urban areas, while 63.2% lived in rural areas.

There were 10,725 households in the county, of which 21.7% had children under the age of 18 living in them. Of all households, 46.1% were married-couple households, 23.6% were households with a male householder and no spouse or partner present, and 23.2% were households with a female householder and no spouse or partner present. About 34.1% of all households were made up of individuals and 16.3% had someone living alone who was 65 years of age or older.

There were 13,212 housing units, of which 18.8% were vacant. Among occupied housing units, 77.8% were owner-occupied and 22.2% were renter-occupied. The homeowner vacancy rate was 1.5% and the rental vacancy rate was 5.7%.

== Education ==
School districts include:

- Bark River-Harris School District
- Carney-Nadeau Public Schools
- Menominee Area Public Schools
- Norway-Vulcan Area Schools
- North Central Area Schools
- Stephenson Area Public Schools

Hannahville Indian School, a Bureau of Indian Education-affiliated tribal school (which also functions as a charter school), is in the county.

== Government ==
Menominee County was strongly Republican-leaning at its start, but has been more middle-leaning during the 20th century. Since 1876, the Republican Party nominee has carried the county vote in 69% of the elections (25 of 36 elections). In 2016, Donald Trump became the first Republican to carry the county by over 60 percentage points since 1920, and he improved his margin in both subsequent elections.

United States presidential election results for Menominee County, Michigan
Year	Republican		Democratic		Third party(ies)	
Year	No.	%	No.	%	No.	%
1876	393	52.82%	351	47.18%	0	0.00%
1880	1,380	60.90%	880	38.83%	6	0.26%
1884	2,614	73.12%	936	26.18%	25	0.70%
1888	3,156	57.09%	2,228	40.30%	144	2.60%
1892	1,853	48.43%	1,801	47.07%	172	4.50%
1896	3,105	66.39%	1,499	32.05%	73	1.56%
1900	3,121	65.97%	1,543	32.61%	67	1.42%
1904	3,246	72.98%	989	22.23%	213	4.79%
1908	2,843	65.00%	1,299	29.70%	232	5.30%
1912	1,191	26.94%	1,195	27.03%	2,035	46.03%
1916	2,671	56.93%	1,854	39.51%	167	3.56%
1920	5,045	72.41%	1,560	22.39%	362	5.20%
1924	4,142	53.35%	1,055	13.59%	2,567	33.06%
1928	4,255	50.02%	4,198	49.35%	54	0.63%
1932	3,374	35.62%	5,782	61.04%	317	3.35%
1936	3,556	33.72%	6,447	61.13%	543	5.15%
1940	5,409	48.26%	5,727	51.10%	72	0.64%
1944	4,869	50.86%	4,632	48.39%	72	0.75%
1948	4,420	45.72%	5,094	52.69%	153	1.58%
1952	6,147	55.54%	4,884	44.13%	37	0.33%
1956	6,137	57.05%	4,610	42.86%	10	0.09%
1960	5,064	46.30%	5,857	53.55%	17	0.16%
1964	3,545	33.19%	7,119	66.64%	18	0.17%
1968	4,599	45.50%	4,877	48.25%	632	6.25%
1972	6,060	55.19%	4,657	42.41%	264	2.40%
1976	5,633	49.60%	5,596	49.27%	128	1.13%
1980	6,170	52.52%	4,962	42.23%	617	5.25%
1984	6,618	59.68%	4,425	39.90%	46	0.41%
1988	5,440	52.28%	4,918	47.26%	48	0.46%
1992	3,995	36.05%	4,559	41.14%	2,528	22.81%
1996	4,038	39.65%	4,880	47.92%	1,266	12.43%
2000	5,529	52.99%	4,597	44.06%	308	2.95%
2004	5,942	52.04%	5,326	46.64%	151	1.32%
2008	4,855	43.85%	5,981	54.02%	236	2.13%
2012	5,564	50.73%	5,242	47.80%	161	1.47%
2016	6,702	61.92%	3,539	32.70%	583	5.39%
2020	8,117	64.31%	4,316	34.20%	188	1.49%
2024	8,647	66.21%	4,256	32.59%	157	1.20%

United States Senate election results for Menominee County, Michigan1
Year	Republican		Democratic		Third party(ies)	
Year	No.	%	No.	%	No.	%
2024	8,332	65.59%	4,041	31.81%	330	2.60%

Michigan Gubernatorial election results for Menominee County
Year	Republican		Democratic		Third party(ies)	
Year	No.	%	No.	%	No.	%
2022	6,129	63.34%	3,347	34.59%	200	2.07%

Menominee County operates the County jail, maintains rural roads, operates the major local courts, records deeds, mortgages, and vital records, administers public health regulations, and participates with the state in the provision of social services. The county board of commissioners controls the budget and has limited authority to make laws or ordinances. In Michigan, most local government functions – police and fire, building and zoning, tax assessment, street maintenance etc. – are the responsibility of individual cities and townships.

=== Elected officials ===
- Prosecuting Attorney: Jeffrey Rogg
- Sheriff: Darrin Kudwa
- County Clerk/Register of Deeds: Marc Kleiman
- County Treasurer: Barbara Parrett
- Drain Commissioner: Caleb Kleiman
- Road Commissioners: Ken Bower, James Marsicek, Leonard Kosewski

== See also ==
- List of Michigan State Historic Sites in Menominee County
- National Register of Historic Places listings in Menominee County, Michigan
