= Indiantown, Menominee County, Michigan =

Indiantown, Michigan
- Unincorporated community
- Location within the state of Michigan
- Coordinates: 45°42′16″N 87°22′37″W
- Country: United States
- State: Michigan
- County: Menominee
- Township: Harris
- Elevation: 774 ft (236 m)
- Time zone: UTC-6 (Central (CST))
  - Summer (DST): UTC-5 (CDT)
- ZIP code(s): 49896
- Area code: 906
- GNIS feature ID: 1617639

Indiantown is an unincorporated community in Menominee County, in the U.S. state of Michigan.

== History ==
The community was named from the fact the town site had contained an Indian settlement before the railroad station was built.
