= Carney, Michigan =

- Village
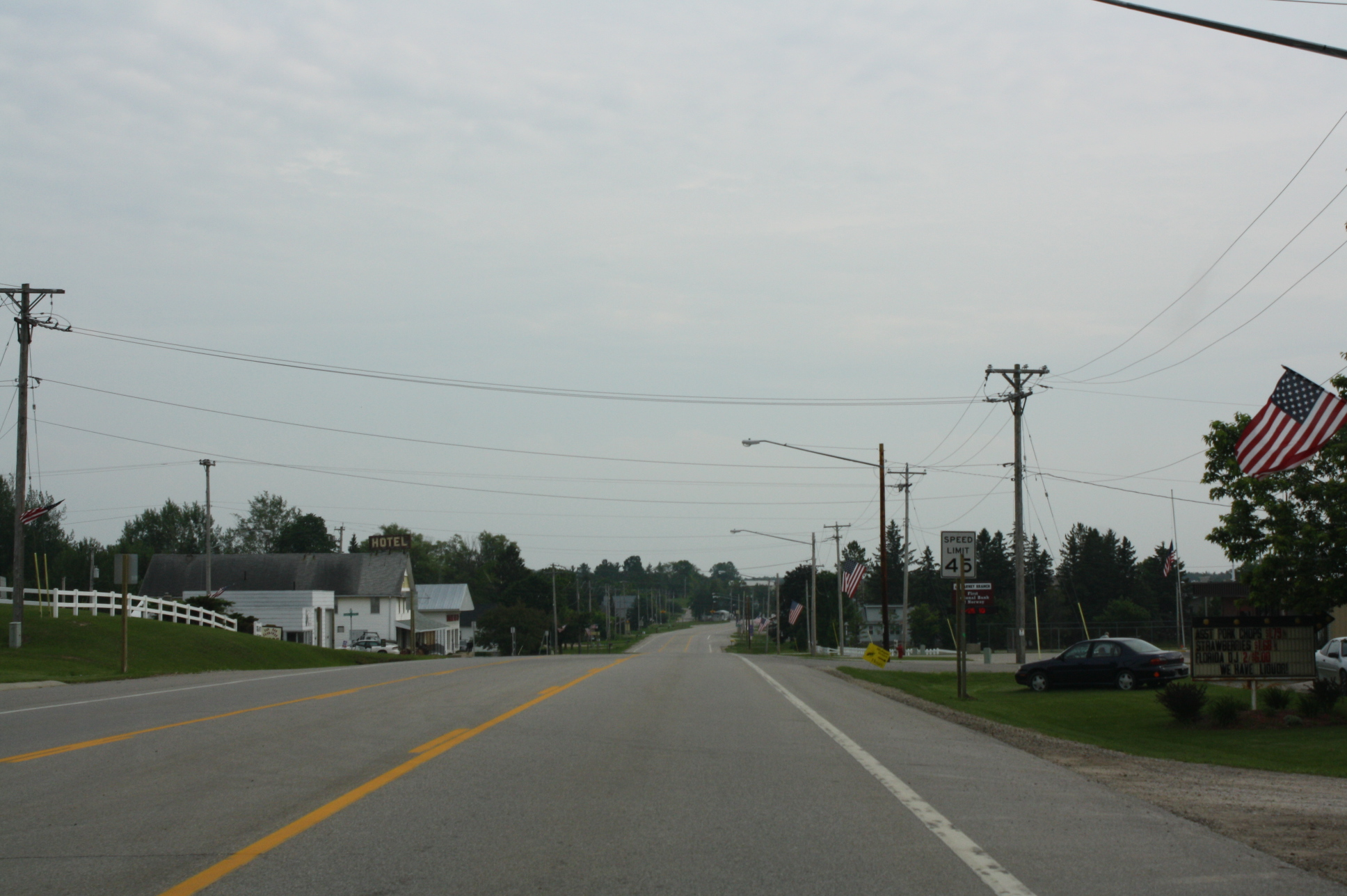
- Looking south at Carney along U.S. Route 41

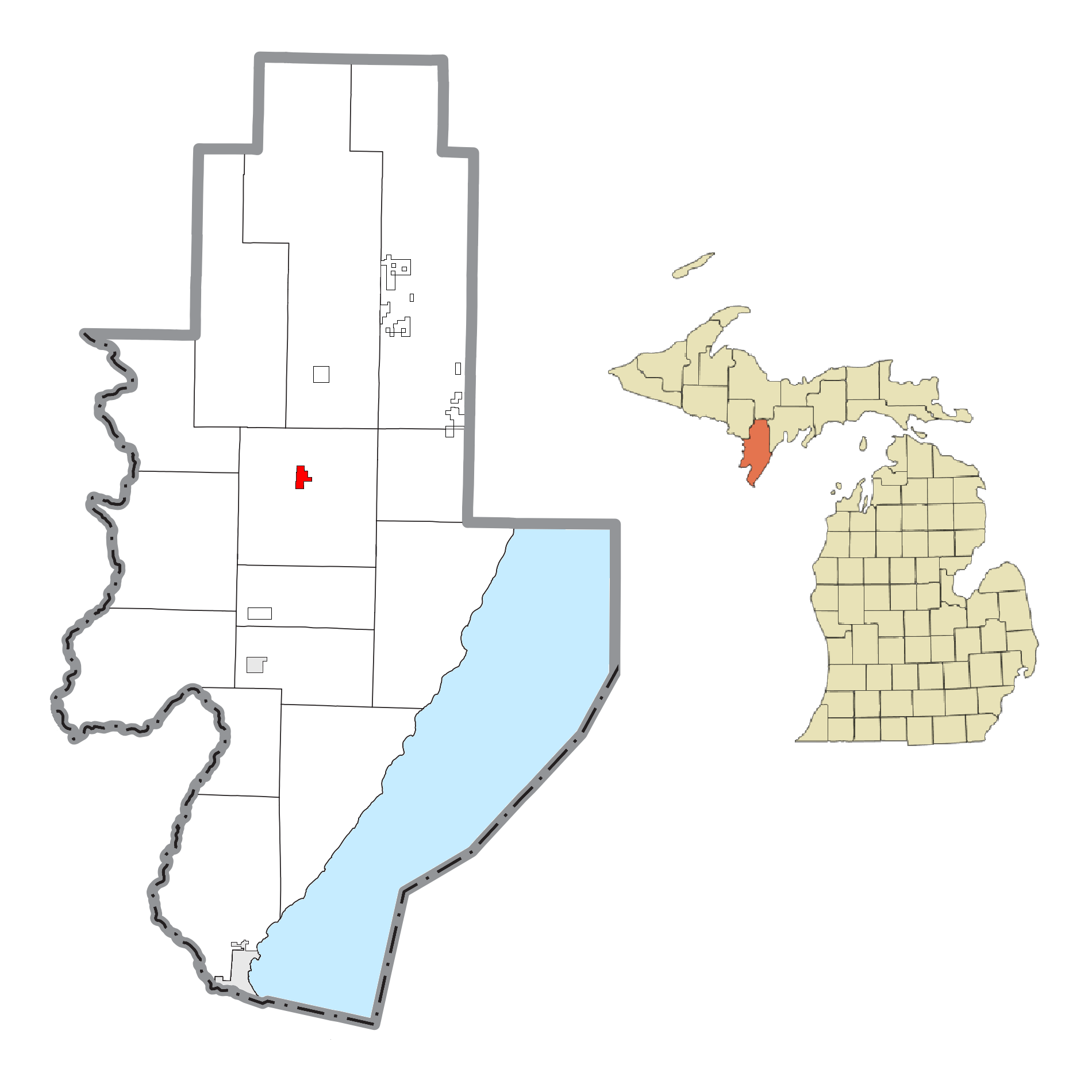
- Location within Menominee County and the state of Michigan

- Location within Michigan Location within the United States
- Coordinates: 45°35′16″N 87°33′15″W
- Country: United States
- State: Michigan
- County: Menominee
- Township: Nadeau

Area
  - Total: 1.37 sq mi (3.55 km^{2})
  - Land: 1.37 sq mi (3.55 km^{2})
  - Water: 0 sq mi (0.00 km^{2})
- Elevation: 797 ft (243 m)

Population (2020)
  - Total: 179
  - Density: 131/sq mi (50.4/km^{2})
- Time zone: UTC-6 (Central (CST))
  - Summer (DST): UTC-5 (CDT)
- ZIP Code: 49812
- Area code: 906
- FIPS code: 26-13400
- GNIS feature ID: 0622743

Carney is a village in Menominee County of the U.S. state of Michigan. The population was 179 as of the 2020 census. The village is within Nadeau Township.

Carney is part of the Marinette, WI–MI micropolitan statistical area.

== History ==
Carney began as a station on the Chicago and North Western Railway in 1879. The village was named for Frederick Carney, who owned a warehouse at the town site.

== Geography ==
Carney is in central Menominee County along U.S. Route 41, which leads south 34 miles (55 km) to Menominee, the county seat, and north 7 miles (11 km) to U.S. Route 2 at Powers. It is bordered to the north by the unincorporated community of Nadeau. According to the U.S. Census Bureau, the village of Carney has a total area of 1.37 square miles (3.55 km^{2}), all land. Poterfield Creek, a tributary of the Little Cedar River, flows southward just to the west of the village.

== Demographics ==
Historical population
Census	Pop.	Note	%±
1990	197		—
2000	225		14.2%
2010	192		−14.7%
2020	179		−6.8%
U.S. Decennial Census

=== 2010 census ===
As of the census of 2010, there were 192 people, 83 households, and 55 families living in the village. The population density was 192.0 inhabitants per square mile (74.1/km^{2}). There were 92 housing units at an average density of 92.0 per square mile (35.5/km^{2}). The racial makeup of the village was 97.4% White, 0.5% Native American, 0.5% Asian, 0.5% from other races, and 1.0% from two or more races. Hispanic or Latino of any race were 0.5% of the population.

There were 83 households, of which 22.9% had children under the age of 18 living with them, 53.0% were married couples living together, 8.4% had a female householder with no husband present, 4.8% had a male householder with no wife present, and 33.7% were non-families. 27.7% of all households were made up of individuals, and 12% had someone living alone who was 65 years of age or older. The average household size was 2.24 and the average family size was 2.73.

The median age in the village was 47 years. 16.1% of residents were under the age of 18; 5.7% were between the ages of 18 and 24; 23.9% were from 25 to 44; 35.4% were from 45 to 64; and 18.8% were 65 years of age or older. The gender makeup of the village was 52.6% male and 47.4% female.

=== 2000 census ===
As of the census of 2000, there were 225 people, 92 households, and 57 families living in the village. The population density was 226.1 inhabitants per square mile (87.3/km^{2}). There were 97 housing units at an average density of 97.5 per square mile (37.6/km^{2}). The racial makeup of the village was 100.00% White. Hispanic or Latino of any race were 0.89% of the population.

There were 92 households, out of which 25.0% had children under the age of 18 living with them, 50.0% were married couples living together, 9.8% had a female householder with no husband present, and 37.0% were non-families. 32.6% of all households were made up of individuals, and 17.4% had someone living alone who was 65 years of age or older. The average household size was 2.42 and the average family size was 3.12.

In the village, the population was spread out, with 25.3% under the age of 18, 8.9% from 18 to 24, 23.6% from 25 to 44, 25.8% from 45 to 64, and 16.4% who were 65 years of age or older. The median age was 40 years. For every 100 females, there were 97.4 males. For every 100 females age 18 and over, there were 95.3 males.

The median income for a household in the village was $31,111, and the median income for a family was $32,750. Males had a median income of $28,750 versus $28,333 for females. The per capita income for the village was $15,481. About 12.7% of families and 11.1% of the population were below the poverty line, including 14.0% of those under the age of eighteen and 7.4% of those 65 or over.

== Gallery ==
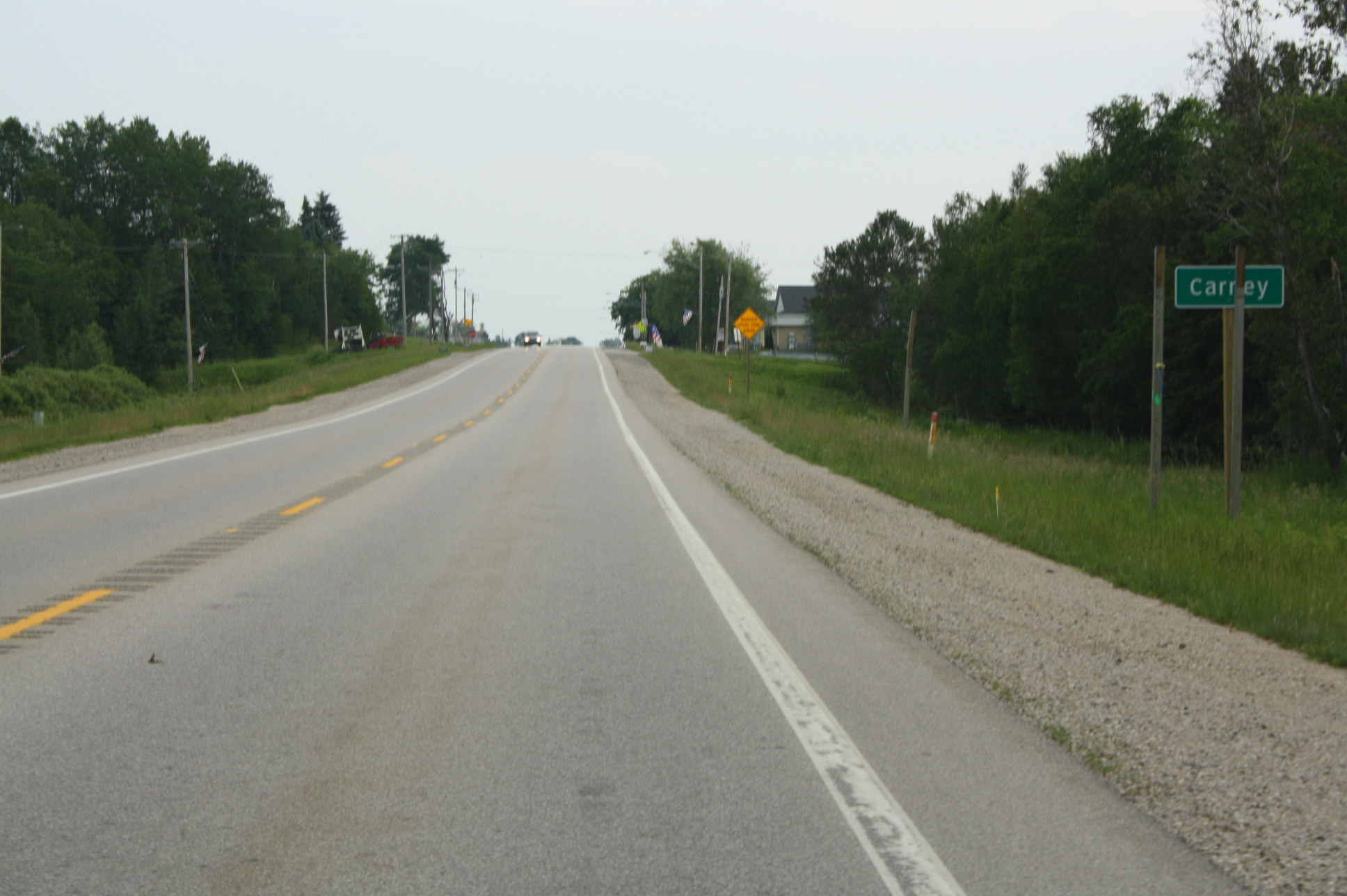
Welcome sign

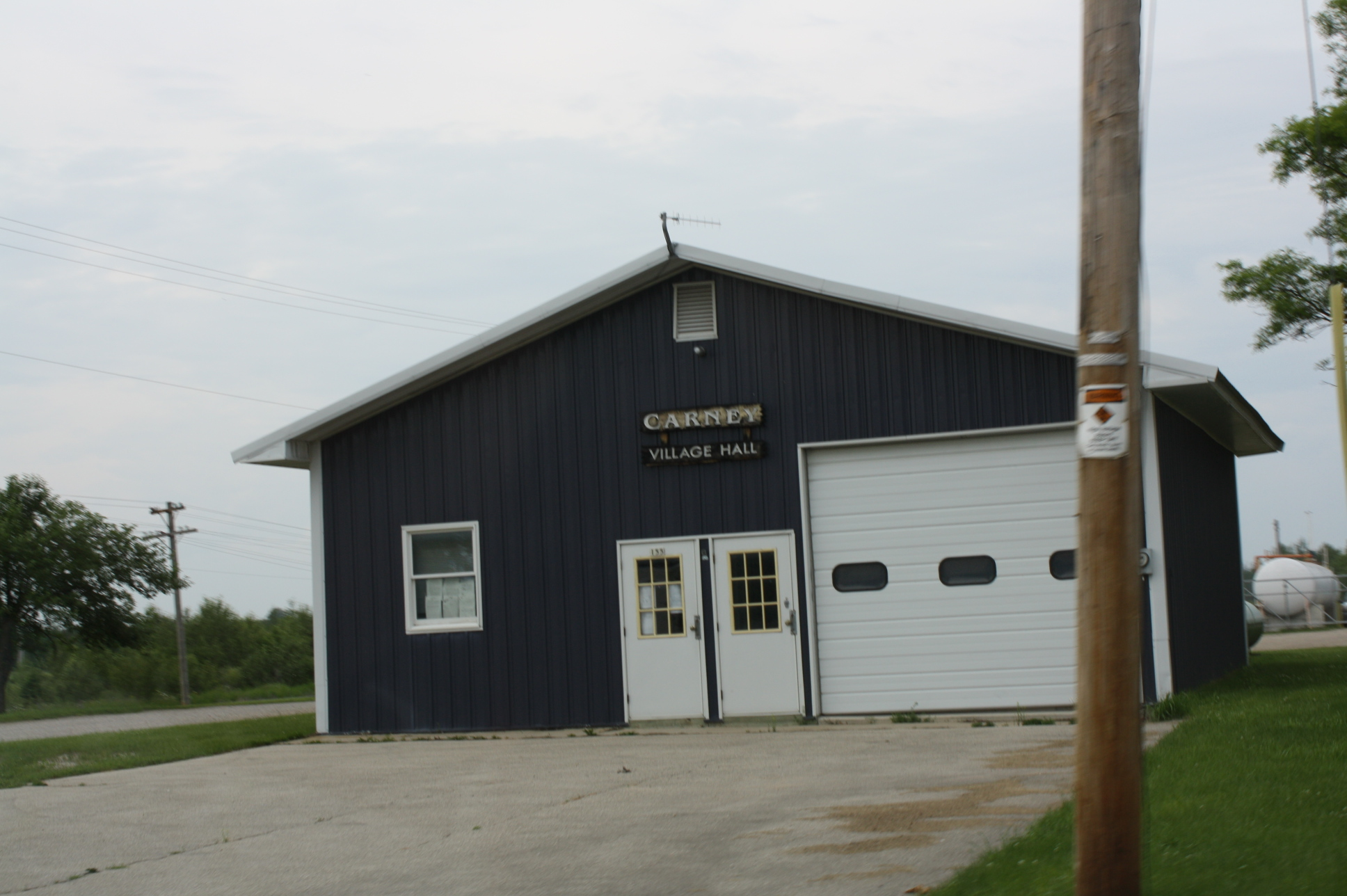
Village hall

Standard Gas building

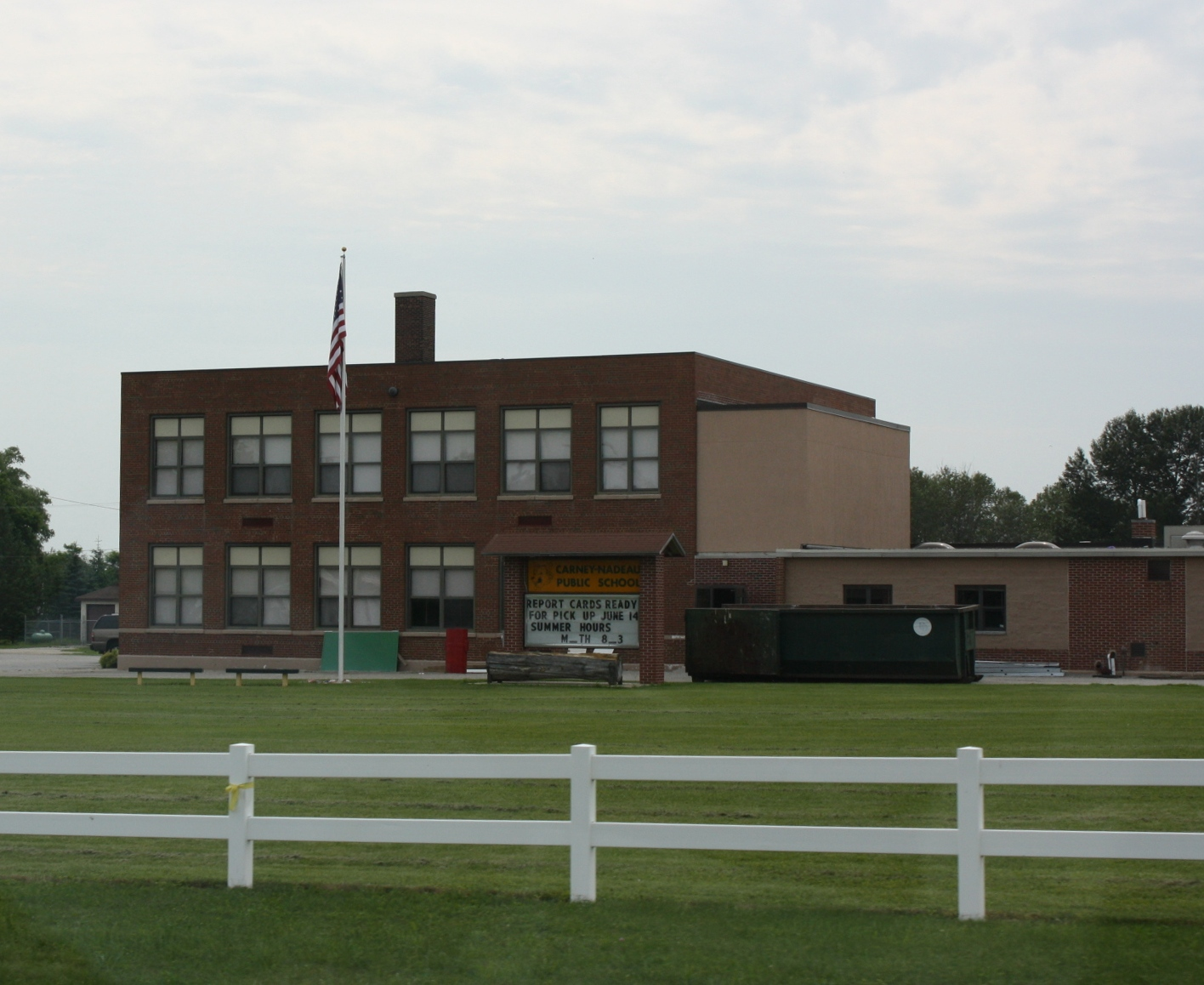
Carney/Nadeau School
