= National Register of Historic Places listings in Menominee County, Michigan =

Location of Menominee County in Michigan

This is a list of the National Register of Historic Places listings in Menominee County, Michigan.

This is intended to be a complete list of the properties and districts on the National Register of Historic Places in Menominee County, Michigan, United States. Latitude and longitude coordinates are provided for many National Register properties and districts; these locations may be seen together in a map.

There are 11 properties and districts listed on the National Register in the county.

This National Park Service list is complete through NPS recent listings posted September 26, 2025.

	Name on the Register	Image	Date listed	Location	City or town	Description
1	Anaem Omot		June 20, 2023 (#100009086)	Address Restricted; 45°28′00″N 87°49′00″W	Lake and Holmes vicinity	Anaem Omot is on the border of Menominee County, Michigan and Marinette County, Wisconsin, and is listed in both counties.
2	Chicago, Milwaukee, St. Paul and Pacific Railroad Station	Chicago, Milwaukee, St. Paul and Pacific Railroad Station	April 22, 1982 (#82002852)	219 W. 4th Ave. 45°06′00″N 87°36′09″W	Menominee	This single story depot, constructed in 1903, is substantially similar to the nearby depot at Marinette, Wisconsin. It was used as an interurban station, serving passenger trains between Menominee and Crivitz, Wisconsin, until 1914. From 1915 until 1927, the rail line offered both passenger and freight service, but the venture ultimately failed. The station was used as a freight stop until 1938, after which it was shuttered.
3	First Street Historic District	First Street Historic District	December 31, 1974 (#74000997)	Roughly bounded by the northern side of 10th Ave., 4th Ave., 2nd St., and Green Bay Shoreline; 45°06′19″N 87°36′09″W	Menominee	The First Street Historic District, also known as the Main Street Historic District or the Historic Waterfront Downtown, encompasses Menominee's commercial downtown area. The district contains over 40 commercial buildings and civic structures, as well as several private houses, spread over a 29 acres (12 ha) area. Most of these buildings date to Menominee's prosperous era which began around 1890, and are in substantially original condition or have only minor alterations.
4	Charles G. Janson Garage	Charles G. Janson Garage	September 2, 2010 (#10000615)	524 10th Ave. 45°06′28″N 87°36′33″W	Menominee	The Charles G. Janson Garage is a two-story commercial building constructed of brick; it was originally constructed in 1915 for Charles G. Janson, a Ford auto dealer. An addition to the building was made in 1933.
5	Menominee County Courthouse	Menominee County Courthouse	March 7, 1975 (#75000958)	10th Ave. between 8th and 10th Sts. 45°06′26″N 87°36′47″W	Menominee	The Menominee County Courthouse is a three story Classical Revival building constructed of red brick, sitting on a rock-faced ashlar basement. It was constructed in 1874-75 from a design by Chicago architect G.P. Randall.
6	Menominee Pierhead Light Station	Menominee Pierhead Light Station	July 27, 2005 (#05000738)	Offshore end of Menominee Harbor N pier at mount of Menominee R 45°05′50″N 87°35′09″W	Menominee	The Menominee Pier Light Station was established in 1877. The current structure is a distinctive red 34 feet (10 m) octagonal cast iron building which was first lit in 1927.
7	R. J. HACKETT (steamer)	R. J. HACKETT (steamer)	May 21, 1992 (#92000464)	Address Restricted; 45°21′28″N 87°10′55″W	Green Bay	The R. J. Hackett was a steamer built in 1869 by shipbuilder Elihu M. Peck. When first launched, the ship's wide cross-section and long midships hold was an unconventional design, but the design's relative advantages in moving cargo through the inland lakes spawned many imitators. The Hackett is recognized as the first Great Lakes freighter, a vessel type that has dominated Great Lakes shipping for over 100 years. In 1905, the Hackett caught fire and sank on Whaleback Shoal in Green Bay, 9.5 miles (15.3 km) southeast of the Cedar River. The wreck slipped slightly off the reef, and currently sits in 10 -14 feet of water.
8	Riverside Site	Riverside Site	March 24, 1978 (#78001508)	Near Riverside Cemetery; 45°07′00″N 87°40′00″W	Menominee	The Riverside Site, also known as 20-ME-1, is an archaeological site consisting of what was once a village along with an associated cemetery. Artifacts found at the Riverside site included a mix of Old Copper and Red Ocher cultures, with some additional Woodland and Mississippian cultural elements. Radiocarbon dating of organic remains indicated dates ranging from 1090 BCE to 70 AD, with the majority of the artifacts dating from about 500 BCE to about 200 BCE.
9	St. John the Baptist Catholic Church	St. John the Baptist Catholic Church	July 21, 1995 (#95000865)	904 11th Ave. 45°06′32″N 87°36′48″W	Menominee	The St. John the Baptist parish in Menominee was the oldest religious organization on the Menominee River in Michigan. The current church, designed by architect and parish member Derrick Hubert, was built in 1921-22. The church was used by the parish until parish mergers in 1972. In 1976, the Menominee County Historical Society purchased the building, and it is now used as the society's Heritage Museum.
10	J. W. Wells State Park	J. W. Wells State Park	February 25, 2002 (#02000040)	N7670 M-35; 45°23′15″N 87°22′14″W	Cedarville Township	The park was established in 1925 through a donation by the children of John Walter Wells, a pioneer lumberman in the area and the mayor of Menominee for three terms beginning in 1893. Many of the park's buildings, landscaping and water and sewage systems were built by the Civilian Conservation Corps in the 1930s and 1940s.
11	Wisconsin Land and Lumber Company Office Building	Wisconsin Land and Lumber Company Office Building	July 26, 1991 (#91000901)	N5551 River St., Meyer Township; 45°42′33″N 87°36′28″W	Hermansville	This building was constructed as the headquarters for the Wisconsin Land & Lumber Company in 1882. It remained as the firm's headquarters until 1978, and in 1982 was repurposed as the IXL Historical Museum. It stands essentially as it was built in 1881-82. The museum is home to items from Hermansville's lumbering and hardwood flooring era.

== Former listings ==
	Name on the Register	Image	Date listed	Date removed	Location	Description
1	ALVIN CLARK (schooner)	ALVIN CLARK (schooner)	May 16, 1974 (#74000996)	June 10, 2020	Mystery Ship Seaport, Lake Michigan; 45°06′15″N 87°37′13″W	The Alvin Clark was an 1847 schooner that sank in Green Bay in 1864. It was salvaged in nearly pristine condition in 1969 and moored in Menominee. However, no plans were in place for proper preservation, and the Clark deteriorated rapidly. The ship and the adjacent seaport/museum were demolished completely in 1994 to make way for a parking lot.

== See also ==
- List of Michigan State Historic Sites in Menominee County, Michigan
- List of National Historic Landmarks in Michigan
- National Register of Historic Places listings in Michigan
- Listings in neighboring counties: Delta, Dickinson, Marquette, Marinette (WI)
