= List of Michigan State Historic Sites in Menominee County =

Location of Menominee County in Michigan

The following is a list of Michigan State Historic Sites in Menominee County, Michigan. Sites marked with a dagger (†) are also listed on the National Register of Historic Places in Menominee County, Michigan.

== Current listings ==
Name	Image	Location	City	Listing date
Alvin Clark (schooner) (destroyed)		Mystery Ship Seaport, foot of 6th Avenue at the Menominee River	Menominee	February 11, 1972
Bailey Fishery	Bailey Fishery	5052 M-35	Menominee	
Chappee Rapids Informational Designation	Chapee Rapids	5 miles west of Menominee, on River Road (County Road 581)	Menominee vicinity	October 1, 1971
Chicago, Milwaukee, St. Paul and Pacific Railroad Station		219 Fourth Avenue	Menominee	November 7, 1977
Hermansville		US 2, near intersection with County Road 388	Hermansville	September 17, 1974
First Street Historic District		Roughly bounded by N side of 10th Avenue, 4th Avenue, 2nd Street, and Green Bay shoreline	Menominee	September 17, 1974
Main Street Historic District Commemorative Designation		Waterworks-corner of First Street and Tenth Avenue	Menominee	September 14, 1995
Menominee Area Informational Designation	Menominee Area	Menominee Tourist Center, US 41 north of interstate bridge linking Wisconsin to Michigan	Menominee	August 23, 1956
Menominee County Courthouse		10th Avenue between 8th and 10th streets	Menominee	July 26, 1974
Menominee Tourist Lodge	Memonimee Tourist Lodge	1343 Tenth Avenue (US 41)	Menominee	June 15, 1979
Phillips Charcoal Kilns		2 miles east of Stephenson, off County Road G-12	Stephenson vicinity	June 15, 1979
Pioneer Grange No. 1308 Hall	Pioneer Grange Hall No. 1308	W240 River Road	Stephenson	January 16, 1990
Saint John the Baptist Catholic Church†		904 Eleventh Avenue	Menominee	February 23, 1981
Spies House	Spies House	1502 First Street	Menominee	April 15, 1977
Wisconsin Land and Lumber Company Office Building		N5551 River Street	Hermansville	December 11, 1973

== See also ==
- National Register of Historic Places listings in Menominee County, Michigan

== Sources ==
- Historic Sites Online – Menominee County. Michigan State Housing Developmental Authority. Accessed January 23, 2011.
