= Cantelon =

Cantelon is a surname. Notable people with the surname include:

- Ben Cantelon (born 1983), Canadian musician
- Paul Cantelon (born 1959), American composer
- Philip L. Cantelon (born 1940), American businessman
- Reg Cantelon (1902–1993), Canadian politician
- Ron Cantelon (born 1943/1944), Canadian politician
