= G. Samantha Rosenthal =

American historian and academic

- Born: January 24, 1983 (age 43); Schenectady, New York, U.S.
- Education: California Institute of the Arts; Bates College; Stony Brook University
- Occupations: historian, professor, activist
- Website: gsrosenthal.com

Gregory Samantha Rosenthal (born January 24, 1983) is an American historian, activist, and author. She serves on the faculty, as associate professor of History and Coordinator of the Public History Concentration, at Roanoke College in Salem, Virginia. She is the co-founder of the Southwest Virginia LGBTQ+ History Project. Rosenthal has written two books, Beyond Hawaiʻi: Native Labor in the Pacific World and Living Queer History: Remembrance and Belonging in a Southern City. She serves on the governing board of the Committee on Lesbian, Gay, Bisexual, and Transgender History and on the editorial board of The Public Historian.

== Early life and education ==
Rosenthal was born on January 24, 1983, in a suburb of Schenectady, New York. Her father, Kimmo Rosenthal, was a mathematics professor at Union College and her mother, Robin Rosenthal, is an artist. She started playing the piano at the age of seven, and continued musical lessons throughout her childhood and teenage years, branching into the French horn and vocal training.

She attended the California Institute of the Arts for a year, to study music composition, before transferring to Bates College, where she also majored in music. While a student at Bates, Rosenthal was a member of a student anarchy group and was active in student protests and anti-government political organizing. She was arrested a few times for protesting the policies of the Bush Administration, the War in Afghanistan, and the 2003 invasion of Iraq. Rosenthal graduated from Bates in 2005. She earned a doctoral degree from Stony Brook University in 2015, studying environmentalism. she was awarded the Rachel Carson Prize for Best Dissertation from the American Society for Environmental History for her dissertation, Hawaiians who Left Hawai’i: Work, Body, and Environment in the Pacific World, 1786-1876.

== Career ==
In 2015, Rosenthal co-founded the Southwest Virginia LGBTQ+ History Project, a queer public history initiative based in Roanoke, Virginia.

She is associate professor of History and Coordinator of the Public History Concentration at Roanoke College. in Salem, Virginia. They teach public history, digital humanities, world history, and LGBTQ studies. Rosenthal has written two books, Beyond Hawaiʻi: Native Labor in the Pacific World, published in 2018 by University of California Press, and Living Queer History: Remembrance and Belonging in a Southern City, published by University of North Carolina Press in 2021.

Rosenthal received awards and honorable mentions for her written work and her work with the Southern Virginia LGBTQ+ History Project from the Oral History Association, the American Society for Environmental History, the Working Class Studies Association, the National Council on Public History, and the Committee on Lesbian, Gay, Bisexual, and Transgender History. Rosenthal serves on the Governing Board of the Committee on Lesbian, Gay, Bisexual, and Transgender History and on the editorial board of The Public Historian.

== Personal life ==
Rosenthal is a queer transgender woman and uses both feminine and non-binary pronouns. She came out as a transgender woman shortly after moving to Roanoke, Virginia in 2015. Prior to transitioning, she had been married to a woman.
