= Drastic Dykes and Accidental Activists =

2022 non-fiction book by La Shonda Mims

Drastic Dykes and Accidental Activists: Queer Women in the Urban South
- Author: La Shonda Mims
- Publisher: The University of North Carolina Press
- Publication date: November 2022
- ISBN: 978-1-4696-7056-0
- OCLC: 1352973397

Drastic Dykes and Accidental Activists: Queer Women in the Urban South is a non-fiction book by La Shonda Mims. Published in 2022 by The University of North Carolina Press, it discusses the history of queer women and activists in the American South, specifically in the cities of Atlanta, Georgia and Charlotte, North Carolina.

== Background and publication history ==
At the time of the book's publication, La Shonda Mims was an associate professor of history at Middle Tennessee State University. She had previously attended University of North Carolina at Charlotte.

The book's title is a reference to the 20th century lesbian activist group Drastic Dykes of Charlotte, which Mims used as an example in the book. As part of her research, she used the King-Henry-Brockington Archive at the University of North Carolina Charlotte.

Drastic Dykes and Accidental Activists was published in 2022 by the University of North Carolina Press.

== Reception ==
Several reviewers praised Mims for her methodical and diligent research, citing the obscure sources she referenced.

In the Journal of Southern History, the reviewer, Leisa Meyer, compared Mims's approach to queer history and identifying historical queer women to that of Emma Pérez– another queer historian who sought to identify queer women who existed without being recognizably "out". She also favorable compared Drastic Dykes and Accidental Activists to Harlan Greene's The Real Rainbow Row, claiming that Mims, through her research, had refuted Greene's argument that covering the history of lesbians was not possible due to a lack of sourcing. She also praised Mims's analysis of femininity amongst Southern lesbians, especially butches.

In a review in Journal of History, G. Samantha Rosenthal described Drastic Dykes and Accidental Activists as an "important contribution to the study of lesbian histories and southern LGBTQ histories", and praised Mims for her analysis of lesbian history during the 1990s and early 2000s. However, she felt that Mims could have made a greater effort to cover Black lesbians and transgender women, citing the book's lack of coverage of the Southern Comfort Conference, a transgender conference that took place in Atlanta during the 1990s and early 2000s. A review in Choice: Current Reviews for Academic Libraries noted that Mims's inclusion went beyond adding a "Black chapter" to the book, and commended her coverage of white privilege in the gay community.
