= Theodore Karamanski =

American historian

- Education: Loyola University Chicago
- Spouse: Eileen M. McMahon

Theodore Karamanski (born August 1, 1953) is a professor and historian specializing in American and Public History. He is a professor of history at Loyola University Chicago, where he directs the Public History graduate Program.

== Early life and education ==
Theodore Karamanski was born in Chicago, Illinois. There, he attended Loyola University Chicago, earning an A.B. with departmental honors in 1975. He later returned to earn his A.M. and PhD in history in 1979.

== Academic career ==
After earning his degree, he went on to lecture at Loyola University Chicago as a visiting assistant professor. He gradually completed his tenure track, becoming a full professor at Loyola University Chicago, where he continues to teach today. He founded the Public History Program at Loyola, which he later directed. He has recently provided analysis on environmental and American Indian policy with a historical perspective.

== Professional career ==
Dr. Karamanski's career as a public historian has been significant. He has worked as an historian in different capacities for many different institutions inside and outside academia including:

- Historic Preservation/Historical Archaeology Specialist at Fischer-Stein Associates of Carbondale, Ill. (1978–1980)
- Historical Consultant for the United States Forest Service at Hiawatha National Forest (1981–83)
- Historical Consultant for the United States Forest Service at Ottawa National Forest (1983–84)
- Historical Consultant for the United States Forest Service at McCormick Experimental Forest (1984–85)
- Ethnohistorian for Historic Resources Associates, Missoula, MT (1998–2005)
- Historian for the National Park Service at the Millwood Plantation Historic Archaeology Project (1981–83)
- President, National Council on Public History, 1989–1990
- National Register Historian at the Alaska Regional Office (1990)
- Historical consultant for the St. Croix National Scenic Riverway (1991–1993, 2000–2003)
- Member of the Illinois Historic Sites Advisory Board of the Illinois Historic Preservation Agency (1988–91, 2005–2008, 2013–present)
- Editorial board of the Journal of the Illinois State Historical Society (2010 to present)
- Board of directors for the Chicago Maritime Society (2009 to present)

== Awards and honors ==
- Choice for Fur Trade and Exploration named one of the "Best Academic Books of 1983."
- Illinois State Historical Society, Special Achievement Award to Work and the Waterways, 1988.
- Illinois State Historical Society, Superior Achievement Award for Rally 'Round the Flag: Chicago and the Civil War, 1994.
- Graduate Faculty Member of the Year, Loyola University, 1994.
- Faculty Member of the Year, Loyola University, 2004.
- American History Medal: "For Distinguished Contributions to American History," Daughters of the American Revolution, April, 2013.
- Russell P. Strange Book of the Year Award by the Illinois State Historical Society for Civil War Chicago: Eyewitness to History (Athens: Ohio University Press, 2014), April 2015.

== Publications ==
- Fur Trade and Exploration: The Opening of the Far Northwest. Norman: University of Oklahoma Press, 1983. ISBN 0-8061-1833-4
- Deep Woods Frontier: A History of Logging in Northern Michigan. Detroit: Wayne State University Press, 1989. ISBN 0-8143-2048-1
- One Hundred Years: A History of Roofing in America. Chicago: National Roofing Contractors Association, 1986. ISBN 0-934809-02-X
- Ethics and Public History: An Anthology. Malabar, FL: Robert E. Krieger Publishing Company,1990. (editor). ISBN 0-89464-362-2
- Rally 'Round the Flag: Chicago and the Civil War. Chicago: Nelson-Hall, 1993/paperback, New York: Rowman & Littlefield, 2006. ISBN 0-8304-1295-6
- Schooner Passage: Sailing Ships and the Lake Michigan Frontier. Detroit: Wayne State University Press, 2000. ISBN 0-8143-2911-X
- Maritime Chicago. (With Deane Tank) London: Arcadia Press, 2001. ISBN 0-7385-0761-X
- North Woods River: The St. Croix Valley in Upper Midwest History. Madison: University of Wisconsin Press, 2009, with Eileen M. McMahon. ISBN 0-299-23423-1
- Blackbird's Song: Andrew Blackbird and Odawa Survival. East Lansing: Michigan State University Press, 2012. ISBN 1-60917-337-6
- Civil War Chicago: Eyewitness to History. Athens: Ohio University Press, 2014. ISBN 0-8214-4481-6
