= Public History Weekly =

Public History Weekly. The Open Peer Review Journal
- Discipline: Public history
- Language: English, German
- Edited by: Marko Demantowsky, Peter Gautschi, Thomas Hellmuth, Krzysztof Ruchniewicz

Publication details
- History: 2013-present
- Publisher: Walter de Gruyter
- Frequency: Weekly
- Open access: Yes

Standard abbreviations
- ISO 4: Public Hist. Wkly.

Indexing
- ISSN: 2197-6376

Links
- Journal homepage

Public History Weekly. The Open Peer Review Journal is an open peer-reviewed academic journal on all aspects of public history addressing a wider audience to popularize academic research and debates.

== Overview ==
The journal was established in 2013 and is published by Walter de Gruyter on behalf of four universities from Austria (University of Vienna), Poland (University of Wrocław), and Switzerland (Universities of Education in Basel/Brugg and in Lucerne) as well as of the International Federation for Public History. The journal publishes in English and in German and additionally in the mother tongue of each author. The journal has the explicit aim to link the discussions of Public historians and history educationalists. That aim of bridging an academic gap has been criticized some time age. The outreach of the journal is indicated with 27,600 visits and 400,000 page views per month.
