= Alvin Clark (schooner) =

Great Lakes schooner wrecked in Lake Michigan

- Formerly listed on the U.S. National Register of Historic Places
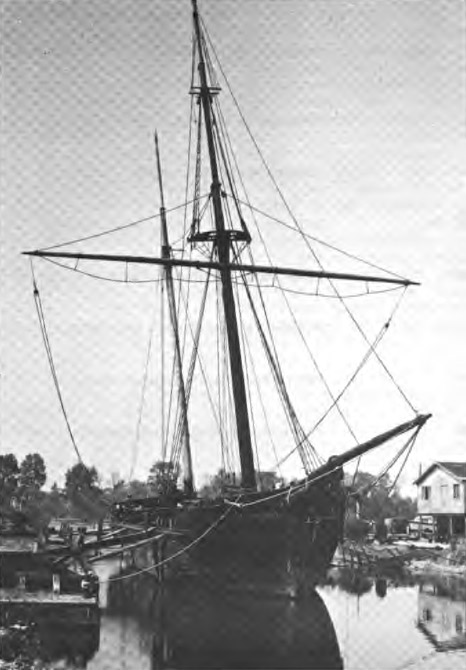

- Location within Michigan Location within the United States
- Location: 6th Ave., Menominee, Michigan
- Coordinates: 45°6′15″N 87°37′13″W
- Area: 1 acre (0.40 ha)
- Built: 1846 or 1847
- Architectural style: Square stern schooner
- Demolished: 1994
- NRHP reference No.: 74000996

Significant dates
- Added to NRHP: 1974
- Removed from NRHP: June 10, 2020

Alvin Clark was a schooner that sailed the Great Lakes for almost two decades. Constructed in 1846 or 1847, it sank during a storm in Green Bay in 1864. It was salvaged in 1969 and moored in Menominee, Michigan, at the Mystery Ship Seaport, located in the Menominee River at the foot of Sixth Avenue. The ship was designated a Michigan State Historic Site in 1972 and listed on the National Register of Historic Places in 1974; Alvin Clark was removed from the National Register of Historic Places on June 10, 2020. Although the schooner was in pristine condition when raised, no plans were in place for its conservation, and the ship rapidly deteriorated. The remains of Alvin Clark were destroyed in 1994.

== Description ==
Alvin Clark was a square stern lumber schooner measuring 105 feet (32 m) in length, with a beam of 25 feet (8 m) and a displacement of 218 tons. It was constructed primarily of white oak, with 2 1/2-inch (63.5 mm) planking and 10-inch (254 mm)-wide ribs. The ship had a single deck, two masts including a 110 feet (34 m) mainmast, and was rigged as a brigantine with a square foremast.

== Construction and operation ==
Alvin Clark was built at the Bates and Davis Shipyard in Trenton, Michigan, in 1846 or 1847, likely by shipmaker John Clark, who had a son named Alvin. Clark, the original owner, used the Alvin Clark for shipping salt until he sold it in 1852. The second owner of the ship was Captain William M. Higgie of Racine, Wisconsin. The schooner spent the rest of its years shipping lumber to Chicago. On June 19, 1864, the ship was heading through Lake Michigan to Oconto, Wisconsin, to pick up a load of lumber, running empty under full sail. As it entered Green Bay, Captain Dunnin ordered the holds cleaned, and the hatches were removed. A sudden storm capsized the ship just off the shore of Chambers Island in Green Bay. Captain Dunnin, the mate, and another sailor were drowned; two other sailors were rescued. An attempt to salvage the ship was made a few months after the wreck, but it was unsuccessful and the Alvin Clark was left on the lakebed.

== Salvage ==
In 1967, sport diver Frank Hoffman was hired by a commercial fisherman to free nets that had snagged on an "unknown obstruction" under the surface of Green Bay. Hoffman dove in and discovered the nets tangled in what appeared to be a ship's mast. Hoffman initially referred to the wreck as "the Mystery Ship at 19 Fathoms", but the ship proved to be the Alvin Clark, and was positively identified through a stencil made belowdecks by one of the sailors. The ship was completely intact and in excellent condition, and Hoffman secured the salvage rights the next year. He assembled a team that salvaged the ship, recovering artifacts and removing the silt from the wreck. Work began in the spring of 1968, and the team eventually brought the ship intact to the surface in July 1969. Alvin Clark was, at the time, the "finest preserved historic vessel in the United States", according to historian Theodore Karamanski. It was completely intact, some of the mechanical systems still worked, and it contained a variety of preserved artifacts. Once the water was pumped out of the holds, the ship still floated. Hoffman berthed the ship in Menominee, cleaned and re-rigged it, and eased it into an earthen slip. Hoffman built a museum nearby and exhibited the ship as a tourist attraction at the "Mystery Ship Seaport" on Sixth Street in Menominee. The ship was listed as a Michigan State Historic Site in 1972 and was designated a member of the National Register of Historic Places in 1974.

== Deterioration and demolition ==
Freed from the cold and low-oxygen waters at the bottom of the bay, Alvin Clark immediately started to deteriorate. Proceeds from the museum did not pay off Hoffman's incurred debt of $300,000, much less provide restoration funds. The ship eventually deteriorated beyond restoration. In 1985, an intoxicated Hoffman attempted to burn with kerosene what was left of the ship, but he was arrested and sentenced to a week in prison and a year of probation. In 1987, he sold the ship, now a hulk, to a group of local investors for $117,000. The investors moved and stabilized the ship, but they were not able to adequately preserve it. The ship was eventually found to be beyond saving and was declared a public hazard. In 1994, the Mystery Ship Seaport and the remains of the Alvin Clark were demolished to make way for a parking lot.

== See also ==
- National Register of Historic Places listings in Menominee County, Michigan
