= If This House Could Talk =

"If This House Could Talk", is a community based history and public art project, first created and produced by residents of the Cambridgeport section of Cambridge, Massachusetts. Projects of a similar nature and with the same name take place annually in neighborhoods of Sacramento, California, Newburyport, Massachusetts, and other communities in the United States.

The concept is to collect and present local history, and historical anecdotes, through a collaborative activity in which residents and businesses post hand written signs and graphics in front of their homes and businesses telling stories and offering information from the recent or not-so-recent past. The descriptive signs are on open display for passers-by to read and learn from as they walk along the streets. Exhibition of the signs may be an ongoing activity or an annual temporary event.

== Community Process ==
This form of collaborative group activity may offer a way to initiate neighborhood conversation during both the creation and public display of the informational signs. In community settings the signs posted for outdoor view present a range of information from the architectural history of a specific building or part of the neighborhood, to personal experiences and stories of the current or historic residents of a particular house. Public projects like If This House Could Talk offer neighborhood residents a way to present historical information with a personal voice. This type of community based project is a method for the presentation of Oral history. Presentation of history this way is related to, but not as formal or rigorous as, local history collected under the ideas of Public history.

This type of free and accessible presentation of information in public places encourages walking and exploration of a neighborhood in order to discover and learn from the signs and artworks. Sharing of local history may bring a community together through the engagement with common stories and sharing of values, and contribute to building a sense of place. An increased appreciation for historical preservation is also a byproduct of the event.

== Critical Issues ==
The historical information collected by activities such as "If This House Could Talk" does not necessarily have independent review or assessment and as such present history that may not be verifiable at a later date. Stories and content collected under this type of open community participation encourage the recollection and recording of local stories, however this type of history may be very personal and closer to the community based content collected by local amateur historians in the study of Local history, than third party history that is traditionally researched, reviewed, and then presented by trained professional historians. The content of information presented in If This House Could Talk events is often more anecdotal or popular, and should not be confused with the more comprehensive perspective taken by the narratives of People's History that document and frame local events within a larger social and political context.

Critical review of the "If This House Could Talk" project in Cambridge, Massachusetts by MIT student researchers suggests that in many cases what is presented on the temporary signs are general architectural facts, rather than a sharing of personal stories that may have more power to encourage conversation and bring neighbors together.

In Newburyport, Massachusetts, the event is part of the Yankee Homecoming Heritage Tours, and is sponsored by the Newburyport Preservation Trust. The Preservation Trust passes out free poster-board to encourage participation. The event is augmented by free home research workshops leading up to the event, where homeowners can explore the history of their house at the Newburyport Public Library's Archival center. This includes access to local deeds, tax records, original source diaries, archival newspapers, and other material. Residents are encouraged to involve their children and families in the research and creation of the signs - resulting a wide range of professional looking signs, as well as those made and decorated by children. Stories are not limited to home research, but can include current day stories about the occupants (or former occupants) as well as items found on or near the property.

The Sacramento event did have signs. However, the project consisted of a series of free neighborhood workshops to help residents learn how to tell and share their collective stories, learn about the history of their homes, the people and their stories that lived in the neighborhood. Residents did learn about each other and engaged in workshops and the walking tour event. As a grass roots effort, the level of engagement is determined 1) by the residents' interest in participating, 2) and the cohesiveness that already existed in the neighborhood. As with all community engagement projects, neighbors need to have a reason or incentive to sustain their involvement on a regular basis. If this house could talk project, is a "friends making" opportunity that must become self-perpetuating to achieve any level of success. A one time event does not sustain community engagement.

== Newburyport's "If This House Could Talk " ==
Newburyport's, "If This House Could Talk" event has occurred annually since 2015. It is a part of the annual "Yankee Homecoming" festival, which began in 1958, and was launched by New England artist Jack Frost to revive appreciation for the heritage and beauty of New England by bringing back natives and visitors to the region's towns and cities.

The first year of "This House Could Talk" was limited to Newburyport's South End, which included the Joppa area of the city. It has since been expanded to incorporate the entire city of Newburyport, and has over 100 participants. A map of the event is generated as people sign up online, as there is no formally led tour and no paper-based walking guide - only online websites that are smart-phone friendly.

The Newburyport event is sponsored by Newburyport's Preservation Trust, and is helped by support from the Museum of Old Newbury and the Newburyport public library archival center.

== See also ==
- National Trust for Historic Preservation
- Genius loci
- Topophilia
- Cultural landscape
