= R. J. Hackett =

Historic shipwreck in Lake Michigan

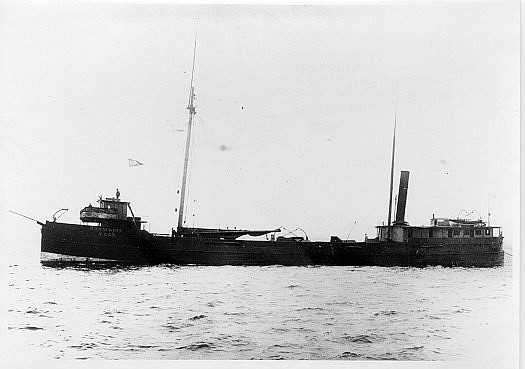
- R. J. Hackett under steam c. 1900, showing the second deck installed in 1881.

History
- Name: R. J. Hackett
- Operator: Northwest Transportation Company; Vulcan Transportation Company
- Builder: Peck & Masters
- Launched: November 16, 1869
- Fate: Sank November 12, 1905

General characteristics
- Type: Great Lakes freighter
- Tonnage: 749 gross as built; 1,129 after 1881
- Length: 208 feet 1 inch (63.42 m)
- Beam: 32 feet 5 inches (9.88 m)
- Depth: 12 feet 6 inches (3.81 m)
- Installed power: 380 horsepower (280 kW)
- Propulsion: Triple-expansion steam engine
- Notes: American #21934
- R. J. Hackett (steamer) Shipwreck Site
- U.S. National Register of Historic Places
- Location within Michigan Location within the United States
- Location: Whaleback Shoal in Green Bay, 9.5 miles southeast of the Cedar River in Menominee County, Michigan.
- Coordinates: 45°21′28″N 87°10′55″W
- Area: 1.4 acres (0.57 ha)
- Built: 1869
- Built by: Peck & Masters
- Architect: Elihu Peck
- NRHP reference No.: 92000464
- Added to NRHP: May 21, 1992

R. J. Hackett (official number 21934) was a steamer built in 1869 in Cleveland, Ohio, by Peck & Masters. When the ship was first launched, both its wide cross-section and long midships hold were unconventional. The design's clear advantages in moving cargo through the inland lakes quickly resulted in many imitators.

The Hackett is recognized as the first Great Lakes freighter, a vessel type that has dominated Great Lakes shipping for more than 100 years. In 1905, the Hackett caught fire and sank on Whaleback Shoal in Green Bay, 9.5 miles (15.3 km) southeast of the Cedar River in Menominee County, Michigan. The wreck site was listed on the National Register of Historic Places in 1992 because of the importance of this ship.

== Shipbuilder Elihu M. Peck ==
Elihu Monroe Peck (1822 – May 8, 1896) was a pioneer in shipbuilding and passenger and freight hauling. He was born in Butternuts, New York in 1822.

When Peck was 16, he began working in the profession of ship's carpenter. He moved to Cleveland, Ohio and apprenticed to shipbuilder Philo Moses.

Early in his career, in 1845 Peck married Susan Ettling Rogers of Bedford, Ohio. The couple had two children, both of whom died young.

In 1847, Peck at 25 started his own shipyard in Cleveland. He built one new ship (the schooner Jenny Lind), but focused on the repair of older ships. The schooner Jenny Lind expressed some of his innovative thinking: it had a blunt bow and almost square cross-section, unlike the more conventional sleek, raked schooners of the day. This design resulted in more cargo space, giving the ship an advantage over competing schooners.

Peck later captained his own ship, the Fountain City, in transporting iron ore.

In 1855, Peck formed a partnership with Irvine U. Masters, beginning the firm of Peck & Masters. Their new firm focused on building new vessels. When Masters died a decade later in 1866, Peck kept the full name of the firm, as they had built a solid reputation.

Peck also had business interests in Cleveland beyond shipbuilding. He served as president of People's Gas Light Company of Cleveland and a director of the Savings Loan Association. In 1855 he served as a delegate to his county Republican convention; in 1867 he ran for public office and was elected a waterworks commissioner.

Peck had a reputation as a brusque but fair man, with a streak of unconventionality. When work was slow, he kept his builders employed by building ships on speculation; these speculative builds were always eventually sold.

== Building the R. J. Hackett ==
By 1869, Peck & Masters was a highly regarded firm and had built more than 50 ships, including the 1867 package freighter Nebraska. At 280 feet (85 meters) in length and almost 1,500 gross register tons, it was the largest ship on the Great Lakes at the time. Most of the ships built by Peck & Masters were of a relatively conventional design.

In 1869 Peck decided to push his design toward unconventional for a new vessel. For this project, he took on an investing partner, Captain Robert J. Hackett of Detroit. They designed and built the R. J. Hackett on speculation, launching the ship on November 16, 1869, in Cleveland. The Hackett, like the Jenny Lind, had a boxy hull, increasing cargo capacity.

When Peck and Hackett could not find a buyer for the new ship, they organized the Northwest Transportation Company, along with Hackett's brother and Harvey Brown, an agent for the Jackson Iron Company. Hackett established the company headquarters in Detroit, and hired Captain David Trotter to sail the Hackett. The ship was enrolled on March 31, 1870, in Detroit, and set off on her first voyage that spring.

== Description ==
The R. J. Hackett was a wooden-hulled propeller ship, measuring 749 gross tons, with a length of 208 feet 1 inch (63.42 m), a beam of 32 feet 5 inches (9.88 m), and a depth of 12 feet 6 inches (3.81 m). The ship was originally powered by a 475 horsepower (354 kW) steam engine placed all the way aft and connected to a propeller. In an 1883 retrofit, a 380 horsepower (280 kW) compound steeple engine was installed.

The deckhouse with galley and crew quarters sat aft above the engine room, and a second deckhouse containing the captain's cabin and a pilothouse sat near the bow of the ship. The Hackett originally had two masts, which could be set with sail or used to support block and tackle when the ship was unloading. A line of hatches on 24 feet (7.3 m) centers, granting access to the hold, ran the length of the deck. A third mast was added in a later retrofit.

== Significance of the Hackett ==
The design of the R. J. Hackett was innovative. With its boxy hull, hatch-lined deck, and placement of the deckhouses, the ship was ideally suited for moving cargo through inland waterways. The fore and aft deckhouses gave the Hackett a single immense hold that could be easily accessed and filled with cargo. The boxy hull maximized cargo volume, and the hatch spacing lined the ship up perfectly with the ore dock chutes in Marquette, Michigan and elsewhere. Since the center section was free of rigging, loading the ship was much easier than with previous designs. The forward pilothouse gave the captain better vision and enabled quicker reaction to dangers in the water. The Hackett's design combined the best aspects of steam and sailing ships into a new class of vessel.

The R. J. Hackett was capable of running 12 miles per hour (19 km/h), faster than a comparable sail-powered cargo ship. Moreover, because of her design, the ship could carry a prodigious amount of cargo. The construction of the Hackett coincided with the explosion of the iron industry in Michigan's Upper Peninsula and the corresponding jump in demand for freighters that could carry iron ore from the mines to the distant smelters, many located in Lake Erie ports.

The success of the R. J. Hackett immediately spawned imitators, completely altering the look of lake freighters thence forward. Over the next 25 years, freighters based on the Hackett's design (now called Great Lakes freighters) became the most common type of ship found on the Great Lakes. Over the next 100 years, the design of the Hackett was the basis for nearly every bulk freighter built for use on the inland waterways of North America. Even as construction shifted in the 1880s from wooden to iron and steel hulls, the basic design of the Hackett was still followed.

== Later history ==
In 1870, Peck added an operational innovation by experimenting with using the freighter for towing. He used the R. J. Hackett to tow the schooner Forest City (of a similar design to the Hackett but without engines); both ships were laden with ore. This proved the utility of towing transport ships through the lakes, effectively doubling the cargo capacity of the single ship without sacrificing maneuverability. In 1871, the Forest City was outfitted with engines to run independently (and was assigned its own tow consort). After that the Hackett towed the schooner Harvey H. Brown.

Elihu Peck gradually withdrew from shipbuilding, and dissolved his shipbuilding business in about 1872, before some of these changes. Within a few years, he moved from Cleveland to Detroit to concentrate on the Northwest Transportation Company and its freighters. Northwest eventually owned one of the largest transport fleets on the Great Lakes. Peck remained president of Northwest until his death on May 8, 1896.

In the early 1870s, the R. J. Hackett was valued at $48,000. In 1881, the ship had another mast and a second deck installed, raising its height by 6 feet 4 inches (1.93 m). at a cost of $8000. In 1883 the engine was replaced with a steeple compound engine by the Detroit Dry Dock Engine Works. In 1889, the ship's boiler was replaced; at this time it was still valued at $50,000.

In 1892, Northwest Transportation sold the Hackett to the Vulcan Transportation Company of Detroit. In the spring of 1905, Vulcan in turn sold the ship to Captain H. C. McCallum.

== Wreck ==
In November 1905, the Hackett was on its way from Cleveland to Marinette, Wisconsin carrying a load of coal. On the morning of November 12, a fire started in the Hackett's crew quarters. The fire soon spread to the oil in the engine room.

Captain McCallum ran the ship aground on Whaleback Reef off Washington Island in Green Bay, and the crew of 13 escaped in the lifeboats. A nearby fishing tug picked up the crew and took them ashore. Flames from the fire were seen by men from the nearby Plum Island Life-Saving and Light Stations, who headed for the ship. By the time they reached the Hackett, fire had consumed the aft of the ship, and soon the entire vessel was gone, down to the waterline. The ship at this time was valued at $20,000 but insured for only $12,000.

The wreck has slipped slightly off the reef; today it sits in 10–14 feet (3.0–4.3 m) of water. The wreck consists of large sections of hull along with the steeple engine, shaft, propeller and boiler, cargo coal, and miscellaneous artifacts. The wreck site was listed on the National Register of Historic Places in 1992.

== See also ==
- National Register of Historic Places listings in Menominee County, Michigan
- List of shipwrecks in the Great Lakes
