= National Council on Public History =

American professional membership association

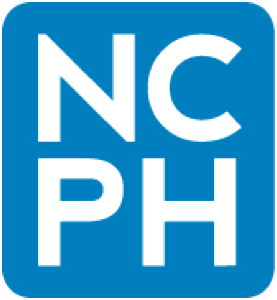
- Abbreviation: NCPH
- Formation: 1980
- Type: Organizations based in United States
- Legal status: Active
- Purpose: making the past useful in the present and to encouraging collaboration between historians and their publics
- Headquarters: Indianapolis, Indiana, United States
- Official language: English
- President: Denise Meringolo
- Executive Director: Stephanie Rowe
- Affiliations: American Council of Learned Societies
- Staff: 3
- Website: http://ncph.org

The National Council on Public History (NCPH) is an American professional membership association established in 1979 to support a diverse group of people, institutions, agencies, businesses, and academic programs associated with the field of public history.

== History ==
The National Council on Public History was established in 1979 as the professional organization of a growing movement advocating and practicing collaborative and interdisciplinary historical scholarship outside the boundaries of academia. With its emphasis on community engagement and activism, the term "public history" united people who were already practicing historical work outside of the classroom, including archivists, museum professionals, government historians and policy-makers, preservationists, oral historians, historical consultants, and more.

The organization was co-founded by historian Philip L. Cantelon and the formation of NCPH can be traced back to a 1978 public history conference in Phoenix, Arizona. Organized by G. Wesley Johnson of the University of California, Santa Barbara and funded by a grant from the Arizona Humanities Council, the conference's success resulted in the planning of the first national conference the following year.

In 1979, the first formal national meeting of public historians took place in Montecito, California, near the University of California, Santa Barbara, with funding support from the Rockefeller Foundation and the National Endowment for the Humanities. Out of the 1979 conference, a steering committee was set up to explore the formation of a professional organization. The steering committee met in Washington, D.C., on September 14, 1979, where they voted to create the National Council on Public History. NCPH was incorporated in the District of Columbia on May 2, 1980.

The current president of the association is Denise Meringolo. The NCPH Executive Office is located on the campus of Indiana University Indianapolis (IUI), and the current executive director is Stephanie Rowe. The association has partnered with a range of organizations and government agencies, including the National Coalition for History, Organization of American Historians, American Association for State and Local History, American Council of Learned Societies, National Park Service, and the U.S. Department of Education. The National Council on Public History's Annual Meeting is held every spring.

== Publications ==
The National Council on Public History produces several print publications. In partnership with the Department of History at the University of California, Santa Barbara NCPH publishes a quarterly journal, The Public Historian. NCPH also publishes a quarterly newsletter, Public History News, a listserv, H-Public, and a blog, History@Work. NCPH also produces digital resources for public historians, including Best Practices documents; The Public History Navigator, a guide for undergraduate history majors to the landscape of public history graduate programs; and the Guide to Public History Programs, a tool for cataloging and comparing graduate public history programs.

== List of chairs ==
- 1980–1983: G. Wesley Johnson, University of California, Santa Barbara
- 1983–84: Larry Tise, Pennsylvania Historical and Museum Commission
- 1984–85: Jack Holl, Department of Energy
- 1985–86: Noel J. Stowe, Arizona State University
- 1986–87: Michael Scardaville, University of South Carolina
- 1987–88: Arnita A. Jones, History Associates, Inc.
- 1988–89: Barbara Howe, West Virginia University
- 1989–90: Theodore Karamanski, Loyola University of Chicago

== List of presidents ==
- 1990–91: David Kyvig, University of Akron
- 1991–92: Brit Allan Storey, Bureau of Reclamation, Denver
- 1992–93: Martin V. Melosi, University of Houston
- 1993–94: Philip V. Scarpino, Indiana University-Purdue University Indianapolis
- 1994–95: Patricia Mooney-Melvin, Loyola University of Chicago
- 1995–96: Jeffrey Brown, New Mexico State University
- 1996–97: Diane Britton, University of Toledo
- 1997–98: Jannelle Warren Findley, Arizona State University
- 1998–99: Dwight Pitcaithley, National Park Service
- 1999–2000: Michael J. Devine, American Heritage Center of Wyoming
- 2000–01: Alan Newell, Historical Research Associates
- 2001–02: Patrick O'Bannon, Historical Research Associates
- 2002–03: Rebecca Conard, Middle Tennessee State University
- 2003–04: James Gardner, National Museum of American History, Smithsonian Institution
- 2004–05: Sharon Babaian, Canada Science and Technology Museum
- 2005–06: Robert Weible, The State Museum of Pennsylvania
- 2006–2008: Bill Bryans, Oklahoma State University
- 2008–2010: Marianne Babal, Wells Fargo Bank
- 2010–2012: Martin Blatt, National Park Service
- 2012–2014: Robert Weyeneth, University of South Carolina
- 2014–2016: Patrick Moore, University of West Florida
- 2016–2018: Alexandra Lord, National Museum of American History
- 2018–2020: Marla Miller, University of Massachusetts Amherst
- 2020–2022: Gregory Smoak, University of Utah
- 2022–2024: Kristine Navarro-McElhaney, Voces Oral History Center, University of Texas at Austin
- 2024-2026: Denise Meringolo, University of Maryland
