= Riverside Site =

Archaeological site in Michigan, United States

- U.S. National Register of Historic Places
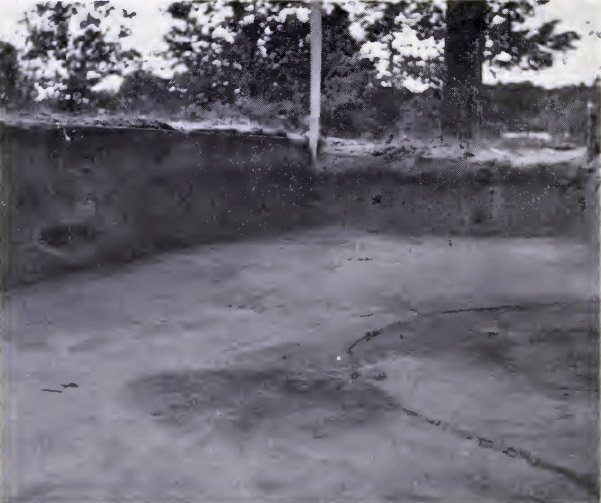
- 1960s photograph showing extent of 1957 excavation

- Location within Michigan Location within the United States
- Location: Near Riverside Cemetery, Menominee, Michigan
- Coordinates: 45°6′30″N 87°39′30″W
- Area: 6 acres (2.4 ha)
- NRHP reference No.: 78001508
- Added to NRHP: March 24, 1978

The Riverside Site, also known as 20-ME-1, is an archaeological site located near the Riverside Cemetery in Menominee, Michigan. It was listed on the National Register of Historic Places in 1978.

== Description ==
The Riverside site is located on a sandy tract of land near Menominee's Riverside Cemetery. The area is covered with low hills and ridges, and is primarily sandy with a thin cover of sod. The archaeological site is located on a high sand dune overlooking the Menominee River.

The Riverside site consists of what was once a village along with an associated cemetery containing the remains of at least 63 individuals. Human remains were found in both burial and cremation pits. The village sites were mixed in with burial pits, and were often found above older burials.

Artifacts found at the Riverside site included a mix of Old Copper and Red Ocher cultures, with some additional Woodland and Mississippian cultural elements. Radiocarbon dating of organic remains indicated dates ranging from 1090 BC to AD 70, with the majority of the artifacts dating from about 500 BC to about 200 BC. These artifacts are believed to represent a transitional culture between the Old Copper and Red Ocher traditions.

Artifacts recovered from this site include stone, pottery, and, particularly, copper constructions. Stone tools and points were recovered. The small amount of pottery discovered was mostly associated with the later Woodland and Mississippian cultures. However, the Riversite site is particularly remarkable for the variety and quantity of copper implements discovered - about 700 in total. This includes the first clearly documented copper implement that was manufactured by casting rather than hammering. Many of the copper artifacts were in an excellent state of preservation.

The site is also unique in the apparent social ranking system, with more prestige artifacts in some graves than others. There was also an apparent emphasis on females and on the infant young.

== History ==
Archaeological evidence suggest that the Riverside site was first inhabited around 1000 BC. Artifacts show occupation continuing to around AD 70, with the majority of the artifacts dating from about 500 BC to about 200 BC. Nearly no more modern artifacts were found on the site, leading researchers to conclude that the site was used only sporadically and temporarily in later years.

The archaeological features of the Riverside site had been known to those in the Menominee community since the early 1900s, and had undergone a fair amount of surface collection. The site came to the attention of professional archaeologists when sand was removed for use as fill, exposing copper artifacts and bone fragments. The first professional excavations were undertaken by Albert C. Spaulding in 1956 and 1957. These excavations were intended to perform a general sampling and to map the entire site. Spaulding's work determined the limits of the archaeological area, identified the cemetery site, and revealed copper tools and the first obsidian material reported in the area.

Later excavations, funded by the Oshkosh Public Museum and the Milwaukee Public Museum and led by Robert Hruska took place in 1961 - 1963. These excavations extensively probed the site. The recovered artifacts are now housed at the Milwaukee Public Museum.
