= The Public Historian =

- Discipline: Public History
- Language: English
- Edited by: Sarah H. Case

Publication details
- History: 1978-present
- Publisher: University of California Press for the National Council on Public History and the University of California, Santa Barbara History Department (United States)
- Frequency: Quarterly

Standard abbreviations
- ISO 4: Public Hist.

Indexing
- ISSN: 0272-3433
- LCCN: 81640706
- JSTOR: 02723433
- OCLC no.: 612397651

The Public Historian is the official publication of the National Council on Public History and considered the flagship journal of the field of Public History. First published in 1978, it is a quarterly academic journal published by University of California Press, with the journal's editorial offices housed in the History Department, University of California, Santa Barbara.
