= Charles G. Janson Garage =

Historic building in Menominee, Michigan, US

- U.S. National Register of Historic Places
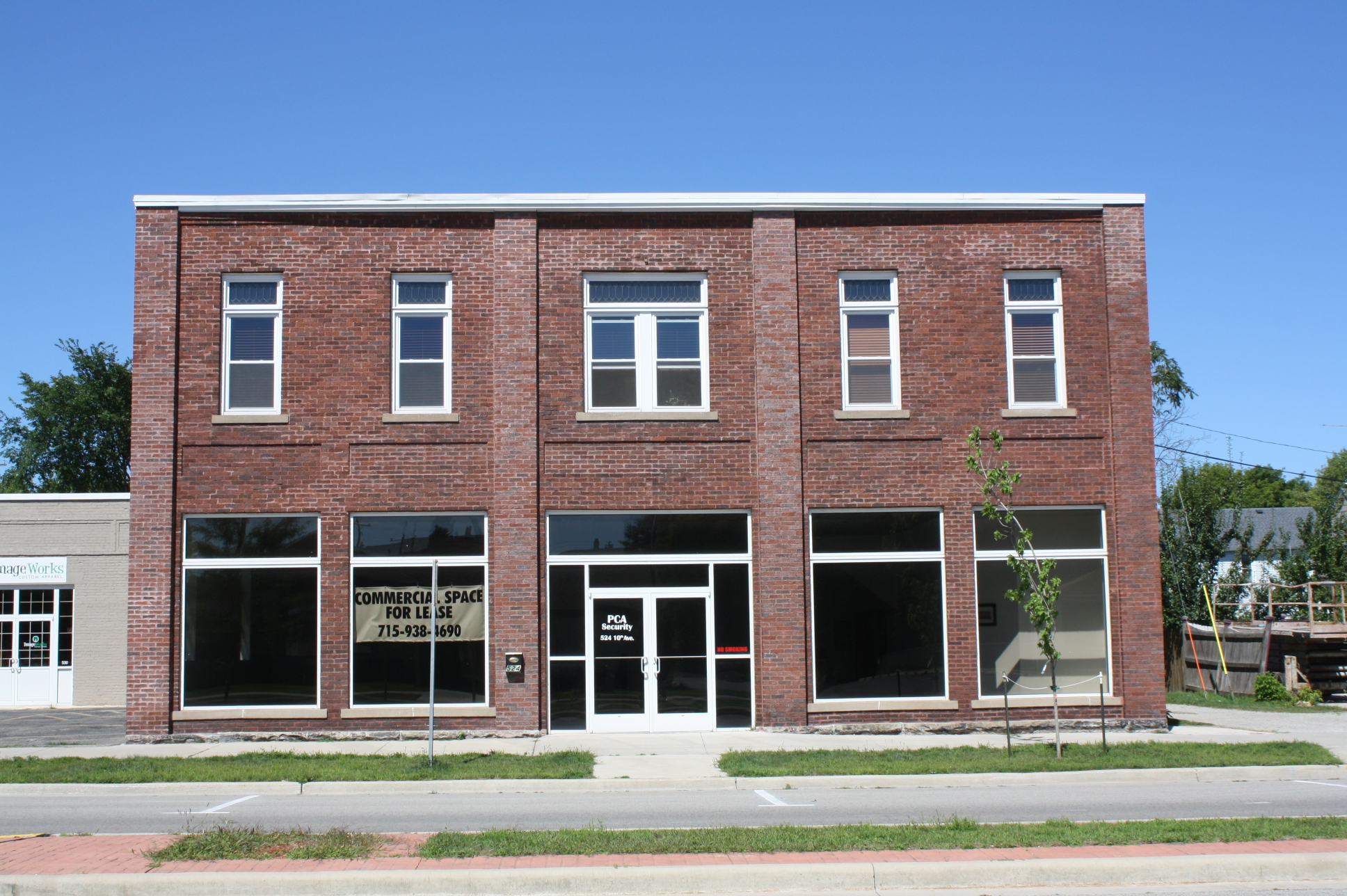

- Location within Michigan Location within the United States
- Interactive map
- Location: 524 10th Ave., Menominee, Michigan
- Coordinates: 45°6′28″N 87°36′33″W
- Built: 1915
- NRHP reference No.: 10000615
- Added to NRHP: September 2, 2010

The Charles G. Janson Garage is a commercial structure located at 524 Tenth Avenue in Menominee, Michigan. It was listed on the National Register of Historic Places in 2010.

== History ==
The Charles G. Janson Garage was originally constructed in 1915 for Charles G. Janson, a Ford auto dealer. Janson was a Swedish immigrant who started as a blacksmith before getting into the automobile business. An addition was made to the original building in 1933. In 1937, Janson retired, selling his business to Herbert J. Norton of Escanaba, Michigan, but retaining ownership of the building. Janson died in 1955 at the age of 82.

== Description ==
The Charles G. Janson Garage is a two-story commercial building constructed of brick. The original section of the building is a deep building with a narrow front, a gently sloping roof, and a stepped parapet on either side. The second floor is relatively shallow. The front facade is faced with dark red brick and the remaining sides are faced with a yellow brick. The front has a wide center entrance originally used as an auto entry, but since converted to a double-door with sidelights. Two large shop windows are placed on either side of the entrance, and a large central window, flanked by narrower windows, is in the upper story.

A single-story brick addition is connected to the side of the original building well back from the street, giving the overall plan an L-shape. The addition originally had three garage bays and a large window in front; the garage entrances have since been converted to doors.
