= Public history =

Historical activity undertaken by non-academics

Public history is a broad range of activities undertaken by people with some training in the discipline of history who are generally working outside of specialized academic settings. Public history practice is deeply rooted in the areas of historic preservation, archival science, oral history, museum curatorship, and other related fields. The field has become increasingly professionalized in the United States and Canada since the late 1970s. Some of the most common settings for the practice of public history are museums, historic homes and historic sites, parks, battlefields, archives, film and television companies, new media, and all levels of government.

== Definition ==
Because it incorporates a wide range of practices and takes place in many different settings, public history proves resistant to being precisely defined. Several key elements often emerge from the discourse of those who identify themselves as public historians:

- A focus on history for the general public, rather than academics or specialists.
- The use of historical methods.
- An emphasis on professional standards, training, and practice.
- An emphasis on the usefulness of historical knowledge in some way that goes beyond purely academic or antiquarian purposes.
- An aim to deepen and empower the public's connection with and knowledge of the past.

These elements are expressed in the 1989 mission statement of the U.S.-based National Council on Public History: "To promote the utility of history in society through professional practice." They are also present in a definition drafted by the NCPH board in 2007, stating, "Public history is a movement, methodology, and approach that promotes the collaborative study and practice of history; its practitioners embrace a mission to make their special insights accessible and useful to the public." However, this draft definition prompted some challenges on the H-Public listserv from people in the field, who raised questions about whether public history is solely an endeavor by professional or trained historians, or if shared historical authority should be a key element of the field. Others have pointed out that the existence of many "publics" for public history complicates the task of definition. For example, historian Peter Novick has questioned whether much of what is termed public history should actually be called private history (for example, the creation of corporate histories or archives) or popular history (for example, research or exhibits conducted outside the norms of the historical discipline). Cathy Stanton has also identified a more radical element in North American public history but has asked: 'how much room is there for the progressive component in the public history movement?' Hilda Kean and Paul Ashton have also discussed the differences in public history in Britain, Australia, New Zealand and the U.S., arguing against 'a rigid demarcation between "historians" and "their publics"'. A 2008 survey of almost 4,000 practitioners predominantly in the U.S. showed that a substantial proportion (almost one quarter of respondents) expressed some reservations about the term and whether it applied to their own work.

In general, those who embrace the term public historian accept that the boundaries of the field are flexible. The juxtapositions between public and academic history cannot be ignored, causing complications in defining who is capable of altering what we define as generally accepted history. John Tosh, a historian who has researched public history, discusses how some of the most productive discussions come from oral history, consisting of people being interviewed about their memory. Its definition remains a work in progress, subject to continual re-evaluation of practitioners' relationships with different audiences, goals, and political, economic, or cultural settings. For example, historian Guy Beiner has criticized the prevalent conception of public history for not adequately taking on board “the countless intimate spheres in which history is retold surreptitiously” and concluded that “the complex relationships between private and public forms of history await to be teased out”.

== Related fields ==
Public history refers to a wide variety of professional and academic fields. Some of these include:

- Applied history
- Archival science
- Cultural heritage management
- Digital history
- Heritage interpretation
- Historic preservation
- Historical archaeology
- Museology
- Oral history
- Public humanities
- Popular history

In addition, a sub-field of scholarly study has developed over the past several decades which focuses on the history and theory of collective memory and history-making. This body of scholarship may also be considered to be "public history."

== History ==
Public history has many antecedents. These include history museums, historical societies, public and private archives and collections, hereditary and memorial associations, preservation organizations, historical and heritage projects and offices within government agencies, and depictions of history in popular culture of all kinds (for example, historical fiction). Ludmilla Jordanova has also observed that 'the state... lies at the heart of public history', linking public history to the rise of the nation state. (English theologian William Paley declared in 1794 that 'public history' was a 'register of the successes and disappointments... and the quarrels of those who engage in contentions [for] power'.) In the late nineteenth and early twentieth centuries, a distinct historical discipline formed within Western universities, and this had the effect of gradually separating scholars who practiced history professionally from amateur or public practitioners. While there continued to be trained historians working in public settings, there was a general retreat from public engagement among professional historians by the middle decades of the twentieth century.

During the 1970s, a number of political, economic, social, and historiographical developments worked to reverse this trend, converging to produce a new field that explicitly identified itself as “public history”. The social justice movements of the 1960s and 1970s had sparked an interest in the histories of non-dominant people and groups—for example, women, working-class people, ethnic and racial minorities—rather than the “great men” who had traditionally been the focus of many historical narratives. In Britain, this emerged through the History Workshop Movement. Many historians embraced social history as a subject, and some were eager to become involved in public projects as a way of using their scholarship in activist or public-oriented ways. In the U.S., a severe shortage of academic jobs for historians led many to consider careers outside the academy. At the same time, publicly funded efforts were underway in many Western countries, ranging from national celebrations like the United States Bicentennial to multiculturalist projects in Australia and Canada, paralleled by widespread public interest in genealogy, the tracing of folk and family “roots”, and other history-related activities. In the wake of deindustrialization in many industrial places, governments also supported regeneration or revitalization projects that increasingly included the use of local history and culture as an attraction or a basis for “re-branding” a depressed area. Out of necessity, inclination, or both, a growing number of people with graduate training in history found employment in these kinds of non-academic settings. Public policy decisions like the passage of the U.S. National Historic Preservation Act of 1966 and the Canadian government's addition of “historical researcher” as a civil service category in the 1970s, along with the rise of cultural tourism and the increasing professionalization of many museums and historical societies, have spurred the growth of the field.

In the U.S., the birth of the public history field can be traced to the University of California, Santa Barbara, where Robert Kelley, a member of the history faculty, obtained a Rockefeller Foundation grant in 1976 to create a graduate program to train young historians for public and private sector careers. Kelley drew on his own extensive experience as a consultant and legal witness in water litigation cases in conceiving the idea of “public history” as a field in its own right. Conferences in Scottsdale, Arizona in 1978 and Montecito, California in 1979 helped to catalyze the new field. The launch of a professional journal, The Public Historian, in 1978, and the founding of the National Council on Public History in 1979 further served to give public-minded historians in the academy and isolated practitioners outside of it a sense that they shared a set of missions, experiences, and methods.

Public history in Canada has followed a similar trajectory in many ways, including the experience of an academic “jobs crisis” in the 1970s and the importance of government as a source of employment for public historians. In 1983, the University of Waterloo created a Masters program in Public History (now defunct), followed by The University of Western Ontario in 1986, and Carleton University in 2002. Also as in the U.S., Canadian public funding for history and heritage projects has shrunk in the past two decades, with public historians increasingly accountable to funders for the effectiveness of their work.

Public history also exists as an identifiable field in Australia and to a lesser extent in Europe and other places. In Latin America, public history finds its highest expression in Brazil, where public history is closely connected with social history and oral history. The Brazilian Public History Network, created in 2012, has been responsible for promoting publications and sponsoring events of national and international scope aimed to foster a creative and cosmopolitan dialogue. As in the U.S. and Canada, there are many public projects involving historians and the interpretation of history that do not necessarily claim the specific label “public history.”

The International Federation for Public History (IFPH-FIHP) was formed in 2010 and became an international association with elected Steering Committee in January 2012. IFPH is also a permanent Internal Commission of the International Committee of Historical Sciences (ICHS-CISH). The IFPH seeks to broaden international exchanges about the practice and teaching of public history and it is one of the constitutive co-operation partners of the journal Public History Weekly. From 2018 IFPH has published its own journal International Public History edited by Andreas Etges (LMU, Munich) and David Dean (Carleton University, Ottawa).

Public history continues to develop and define itself. There are currently many graduate and undergraduate public history programs in the U.S., Canada, and other countries (see list and links below). The field has a natural synergy with digital history, with its emphasis on access and broad participation in the creation of historical knowledge. In recent years there has been a growing body of public historical scholarship, including works recognized by the annual National Council on Public History Book Award. In several countries, studies have been conducted to explore how people understand and engage with the past, deepening public historians’ sense of how their own work can best connect with their audiences. While high-profile “history wars” have taken place over public exhibits and interpretations of history in many places in recent years (for example, Australia's ongoing debate over the history of colonisation and indigenous peoples, the furor over Jack Granatstein's 1998 book Who Killed Canadian History?, or the 1994 controversy over the National Air and Space Museum's planned exhibit on the Enola Gay bomber), public historians tend to welcome these as opportunities to participate in vigorous public discussions over the meanings of the past, debating how people arrive at those meanings.

An evolving form of locally collected and publicly presented history, seen in projects like If This House Could Talk and the Humanities Truck are a less critical and validated public presentation of history, yet offer engagement at the grass roots level that may encourage new forms of collecting history about the everyday.

== Internet ==
People with some training in the discipline of history have increasingly engaged on public history matters in recent years on the Internet away from specialized academic settings. Blogs, podcasts, vlogs, participatory encyclopedias and social medias have often been used to reach and better engage the public prior to publications in more traditional print medias such as books and bulletins. Public interest in own family history (or genealogy) has much contributed to reviving interest in local, regional and broader continental history. Ancestry sharing on social medias has been most noteworthy. The large scale study of history-related tweets conducted in 2021 has analyzed different characteristics of history-related messages which are shared online including mentioned entities, time scope, retweeting practices or types of included media.

== Examples ==
The National Council on Public History's Robert Kelley Memorial Award, “honors distinguished and outstanding achievements by individuals, institutions, non-profit or corporate entities for having made significant inroads in making history relevant to individual lives of ordinary people outside of academia.” Its recipients reflect a broad mix of scholarly, governmental, and popular projects:

- 2020 - Martin Blatt, Northeastern University
- 2017 - Lonnie G. Bunch III, National Museum of African American History & Culture
- 2016 - Donald A. Ritchie, Senate Historical Office
- 2015 - Janelle Warren-Findley, Arizona State University
- 2014 - Michael Devine, Director, Harry S. Truman Library and Museum
- 2012 - Lindsey Reed, Managing Editor of The Public Historian
- 2010 – Richard Allan Baker, United States Senate Historical Office
- 2008 – Alan S. Newell, Historical Research Associates, Inc.
- 2006 – Dwight T. Pitcaithley, National Park Service
- 2004 – The Government and Citizens of the Tr’ondek Hwech’in, First Native Peoples of the Klondike
- 2002 – The University of South Carolina Public History Program
- 2001 – Debra Bernhardt, Robert F. Wagner Labor Archives at New York University
- 1999 – Otis L. Graham Jr., University of North Carolina, Wilmington
- 1998 – The American Social History Project
- 1997 – Page Putnam Miller, Coordinating Committee for the Promotion of History (now the National Coalition for History)

== Bibliography ==
- Andrew Hurley. Beyond Preservation: Using Public History to Revitalize Inner Cities (Temple University Press; 2010) 248 pages; focus on successful projects in St. Louis and other cities.
- What is Public History? from the NCPH
- Reflections on an Idea: NCPH’s First Decade by Barbara J. Howe, Chair's Annual Address, The Public Historian, Vol. 11, No. 3 (Summer 1989), pp. 69–85
- Public History in Canada. Special Issue, The Public Historian, Vol. 30, No. 1 (Winter 2009).
- Juniele R. Almeida & Marta G. O. Rovai (ed.) Introdução à História Pública (Letra e Voz; 2011); first Brazilian public history handbook.
- La “Public History”: una disciplina fantasma? in Serge Noiret (ed.): "Public History. Pratiche nazionali e identità globale", Memoria e Ricerca, n.37, May–August 2011, pp. 10–35. (together with " Premessa: per una Federazione Internazionale di Public History", pp. 5–7.)
- Serge Noiret. Internationalizing Public History in Public History Weekly Vol. 2, No. 34 (sept. 2014)
- Irmgard Zündorf. Contemporary History and Public History in Docupedia Zeitgeschichte, March 16, 2017.
- Marko Demantowsky. "What is Public History", in Public history and school. International perspectives, 4–37, De Gruyter publishers: Boston/Berlin, 2018.
