= Hermansville, Michigan =

- Census-designated place
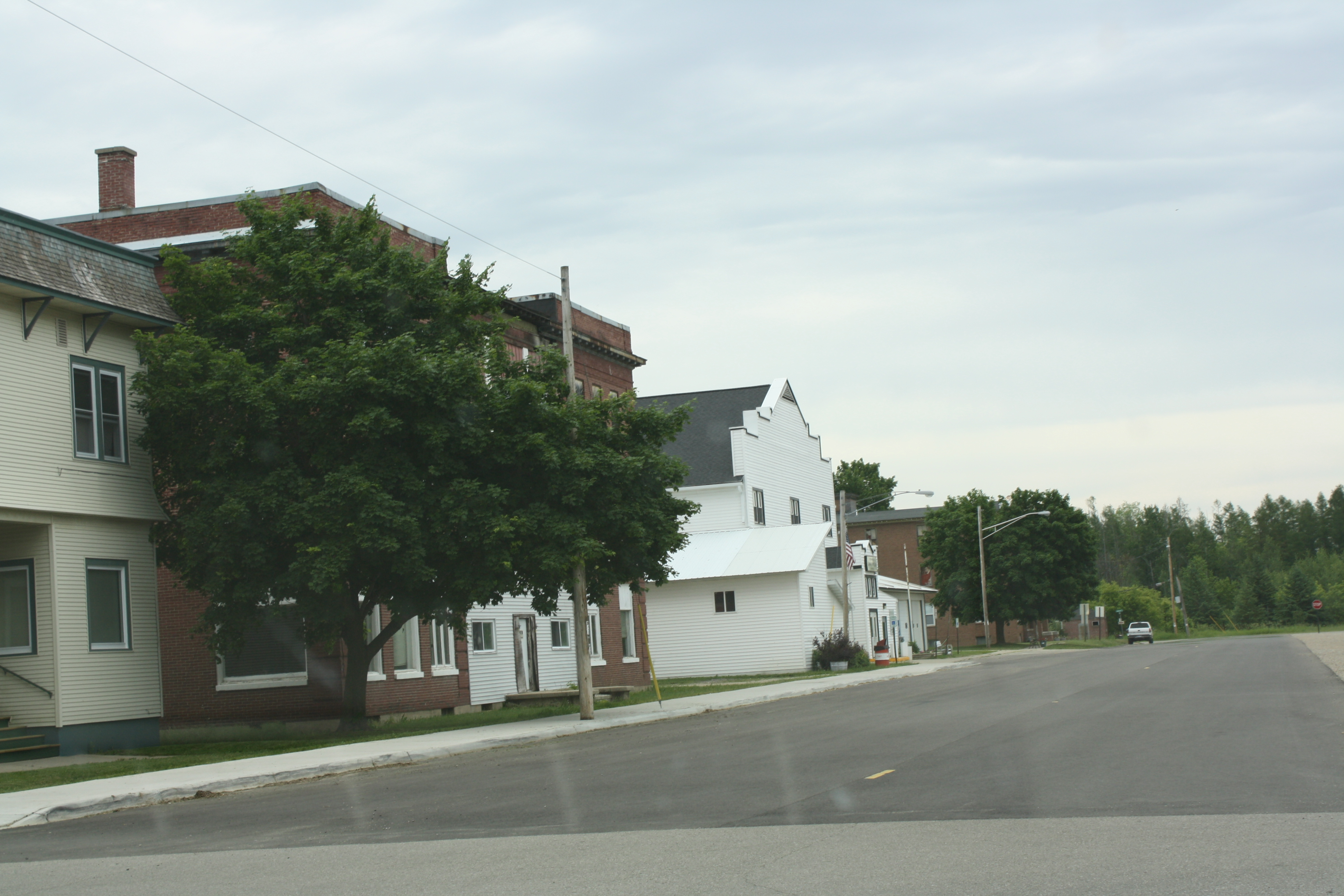
- Looking east at downtown Hermansville

- Location within Michigan Location within the United States
- Coordinates: 45°42′39″N 87°36′05″W
- Country: United States
- State: Michigan
- County: Menominee
- Township: Meyer

Area
  - Total: 1.41 sq mi (3.7 km^{2})
  - Land: 1.27 sq mi (3.3 km^{2})
  - Water: 0.14 sq mi (0.36 km^{2})

Population (2020)
  - Total: 509
  - Density: 399.8/sq mi (154.4/km^{2})
- Time zone: UTC-6 (Central (CST))
  - Summer (DST): UTC-5 (CDT)
- ZIP Code: 49847
- Area code: 906
- FIPS code: 26-37760

Michigan State Historic Site
- Designated: September 17, 1974

Hermansville is an unincorporated community and census-designated place (CDP) in Meyer Township of Menominee County in the U.S. state of Michigan. As of the 2020 census, it had a population of 509. The community formed around the defunct Wisconsin Land & Lumber Company as a company town. The company's former headquarters is open as the IXL Historical Museum. US Highway 2 (US 2) passes through the north edge of the community.

== History ==
The village of Hermansville was founded in 1878 by C.J.L. Meyer of Fond du Lac, Wisconsin, who built and operated a saw and shingle mill utilizing the abundant native cedar and pine growing in the area. The community was named for the son of the original owner of the town site. In 1883 Meyer organized the Wisconsin Land & Lumber Company, which acquired the mill and landholdings, and began working on methods of utilizing the abundant hardwood timber on the surrounding lands held by the company. The company eventually developed innovative new methods and machinery for manufacturing pre-cut maple wood flooring; previous techniques for cutting and shaping maple in the United States were laborious and inefficient because of the hard, brittle nature of maple wood. The IXL brand became a popular choice for flooring, due to its virtually indestructible nature and its rich color and grain. The company also utilized other varieties of wood growing in the area for various products.

A thriving company town grew quickly as the mill prospered, with over 200 company-owned dwellings built for employees and their families. A passenger rail depot, general stores, taverns, a bank, library and post office were established, as was a multi-grade public school. Other industry developed in the area as well, aided by the town's proximity to abundant rail freight service and local natural resources.

The town's growth slowed and eventually declined, due to the rapid deforestation and subsequent scarcity of the timber that drove Hermansville's economy. Starting in the 1920s the IXL Company began selling off the individual dwellings and parcels of land on the village property - mostly to the employees who inhabited them. The village population dropped significantly, and most of the small businesses which catered to local people were eventually closed. By the end of World War II the village's homes were all privately owned, and the IXL Company ceased all operations in Meyer Township by the end of the 1960s. The village of Hermansville now serves as the township seat.

== Geography ==
The community is in northwestern Menominee County. U.S. Route 2 leads west 16 miles (26 km) to Norway and east 27 miles (43 km) to Escanaba. Menominee, the county seat, is 46 miles (74 km) to the south via US 2 and US 41.

According to the U.S. Census Bureau, the Hermansville CDP has a total area of 1.41 square miles (3.7 km^{2}), of which 1.27 square miles (3.3 km^{2}) are land and 0.14 square miles (0.36 km^{2}), or 9.72%, are water.

== Recreation and places of interest ==
As an aid to transport of lumber and for recreational and domestic purposes, the Little Cedar River, a small waterway that passes west of the village, was dammed in the early 20th century, creating a reservoir named Hermansville Lake. The lake is divided into two parts by a raised rail line, and is visually distinctive, as hundreds of tree stumps from trees cut down long ago jut up from the lake bottom. A public sand beach with restrooms is located at the west end of First Street, with public restrooms and a pavilion. The reservoir is currently being improved and, after being diverted and drained in 2006 for stump removal and railroad improvement issues, was dammed and refilled in the spring of 2008.

The IXL Historic Museum, dedicated to the area's early history as a company town, is located in the heart of Hermansville. The main exhibits of the museum are housed in the well-preserved office building of the Wisconsin Land & Lumber Company, a fine example of Queen Anne architecture completed in 1883. One of the most popular stops on the museum tour is at the perfectly preserved main office, which has changed little over the past 100 years. Other buildings on the museum grounds, most relocated from other locations and restored, are also part of the tour – including an early company (worker) house, a railroad depot, and a vast collection of antique turn-of-the-century machinery. The museum and its gift shop are open daily during the summer, and is available for tours at other times of the year by appointment.

The Thomas St. Onge Vietnam Veterans Museum is located in the center of Hermansville, and features exhibits pertaining to the Vietnam War. A decommissioned UH-1 "Huey" helicopter is on permanent display at the site, as well as a full Battle Tank which served in the war. The museum is sponsored by Vietnam Veterans of America, Thomas St. Onge Chapter 571, and is open afternoons daily during the summer.

The village in its entirety is notable for its unique history as a company town, and although the population declined significantly throughout the 20th century and most of the central businesses are closed, many of the original structures and homes remain, and the village looks much as it did in the early 20th century. According to author and historian Kathryn Eckert, Hermansville is "one of the state's best examples of a wood products company town."

== Images ==
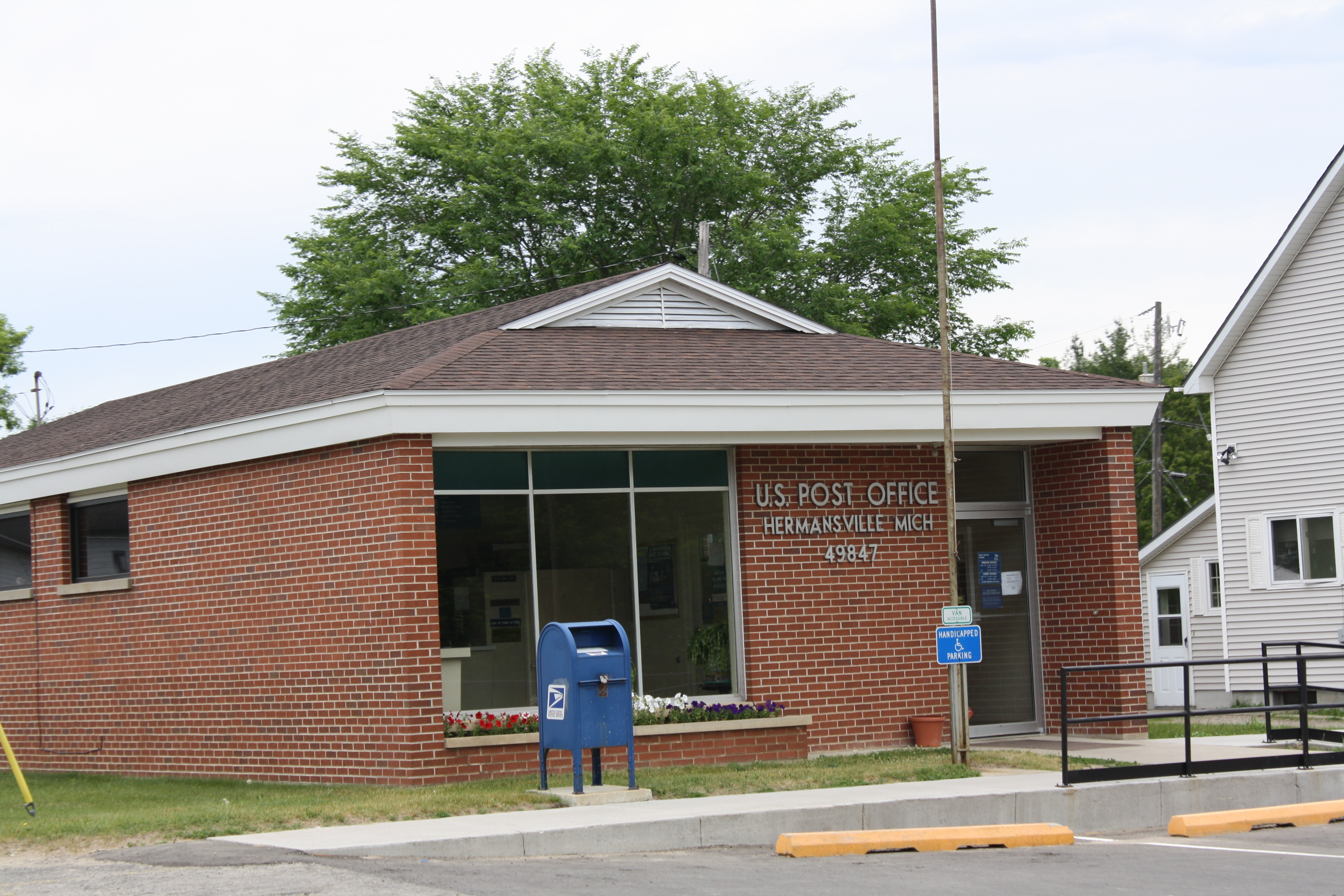
Post office

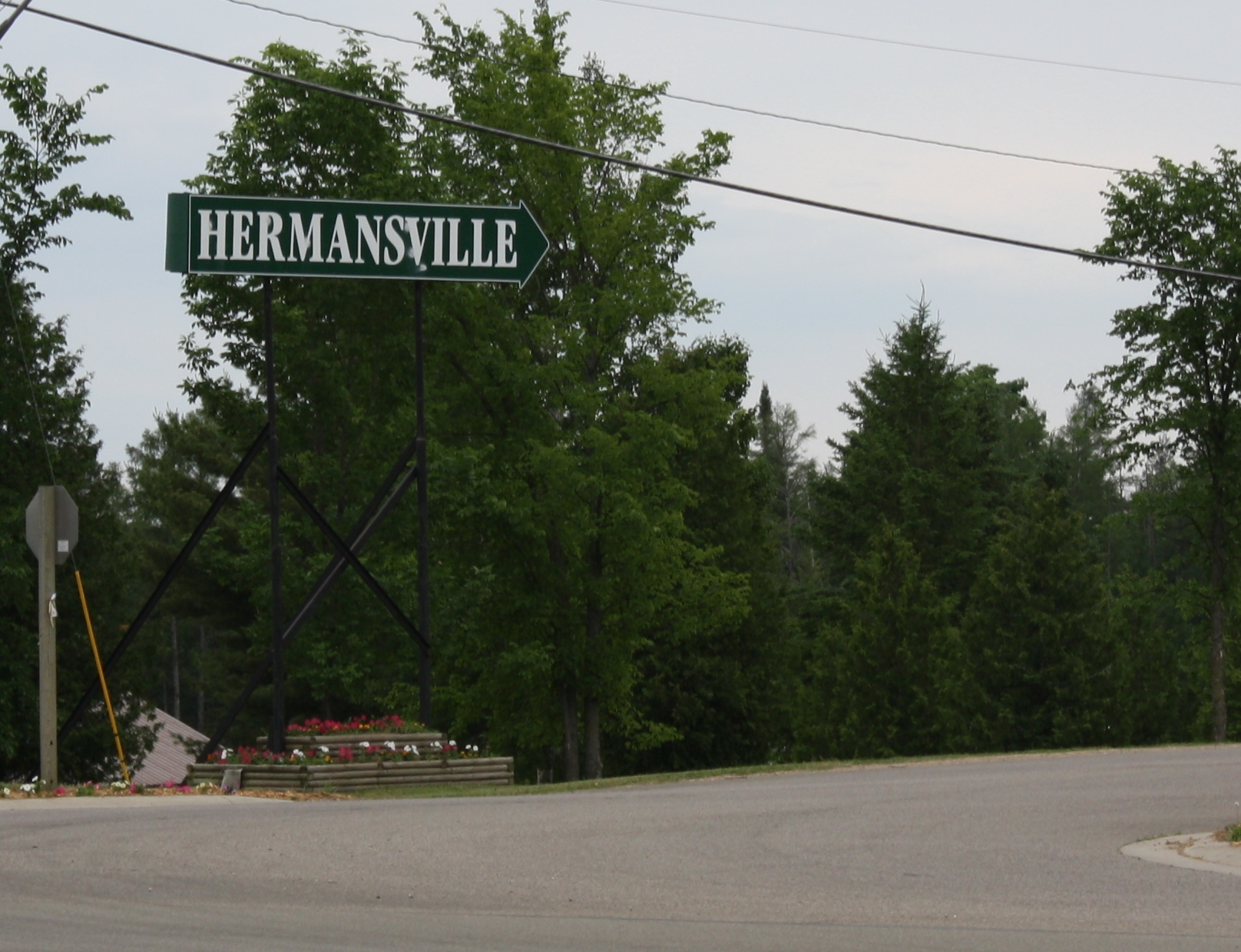
Arrow on US 2

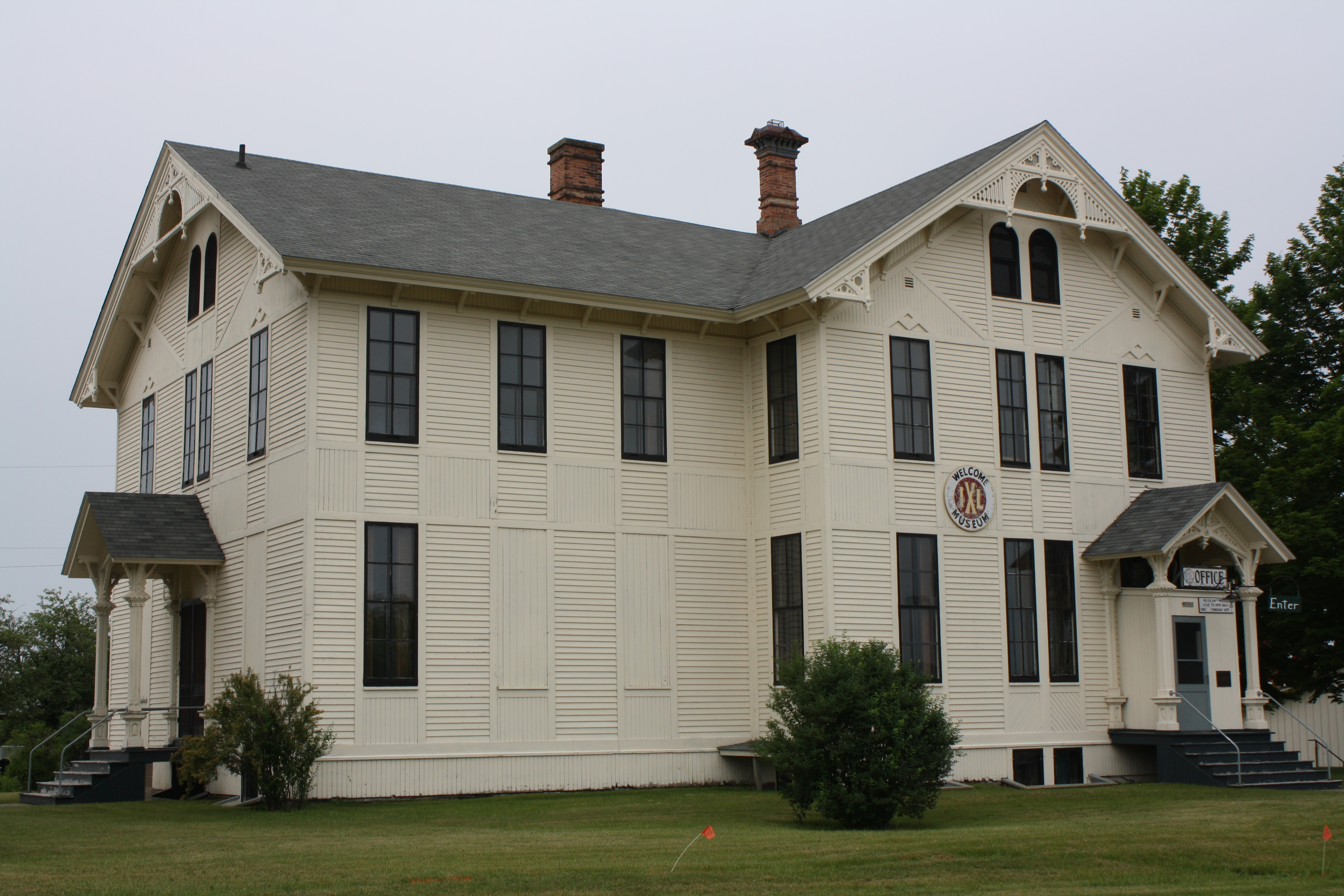
IXL Historical Museum
