= Menominee County Courthouse =

- U.S. National Register of Historic Places
- Michigan State Historic Site
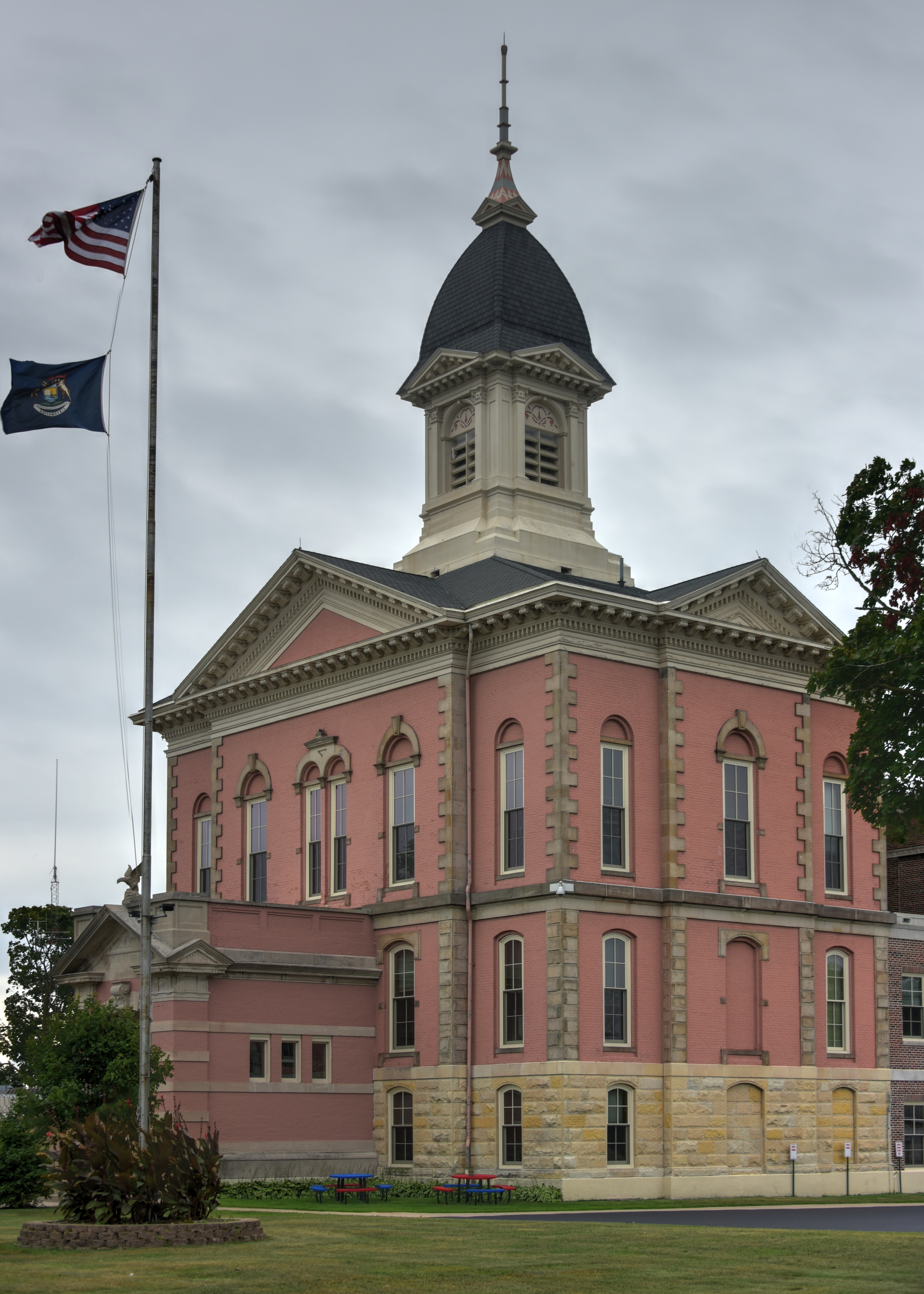

- Location within Michigan Location within the United States
- Interactive map showing the location of Menominee County Courthouse
- Location: 10th Ave. between 8th and 10th Sts., Menominee, Michigan
- Coordinates: 45°6′26″N 87°36′47″W
- Area: 2 acres (0.81 ha)
- Built: 1875
- Built by: Cummings & Hagan
- Architect: Gurdon P. Randall
- Architectural style: Classical Revival
- NRHP reference No.: 75000958

Significant dates
- Added to NRHP: March 7, 1975
- Designated MSHS: July 26, 1974

The Menominee County Courthouse is a government building located on Tenth Avenue between Eighth and Tenth Streets in Menominee, Michigan. It was listed on the National Register of Historic Places in 1975 and designated a Michigan State Historic Site in 1974.

== History ==
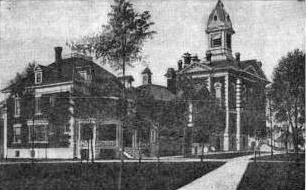
Menominee County Courthouse, c. 1911

Menominee County was created in 1863, and included at the time the land that now covers Menominee, Iron, and Dickinson Counties. The county seat was established in Menominee, and a clerk's office and jail were quickly built. In 1874, county residents decided to build a courthouse, and bonds were sold to fund the construction. A new plot of land in Menominee was found and purchased for the courthouse, and Chicago architect Gurdon P. Randall was hired to design the new building. Contractors Cummings and Hagan were hired to build the courthouse, and construction began in 1874. The building was completed in 1875 at a cost of $29,680. The building originally housed a jail on the first floor, county offices on the second floor, and the courtroom on the third floor.

Additions to the building were completed in 1909 and 1938. The original connected jail and sheriff's residence were demolished later in the 20th century, but the courthouse itself was renovated in the early 1980s.

== Description ==
The Menominee County Courthouse is a three-story Classical Revival building constructed of red brick, sitting on a rock-faced ashlar basement. The exterior walls are load-bearing, while the interior walls, floors, and roof are constructed of wood. Additional reinforcing of concrete and steel has been added during renovations. The building is ornamented with stone quoins and beltcourses separating the two upper stories. A hip roof with a belfry and wooden cupola tops the courthouse. The building has four symmetrical facades, each with slightly projected pavilions topped by triangular pediments. The entrance facade has a projecting foyer which was added to the building at a later date.

The original structure measured 48 feet (15 m) by 60 feet (18 m), giving about 9000 square feet of space. with a jail and sheriff's residence connected to the main building. The 1909 construction added a 16 feet (4.9 m) by 20 feet (6.1 m) entryway, and a more substantial addition was added to the building in 1938. With additions, the current courthouse houses 20,000 square feet of space.
