= St. John the Baptist Catholic Church (Menominee, Michigan) =

Historic church in Michigan, United States

- U.S. National Register of Historic Places
- Michigan State Historic Site
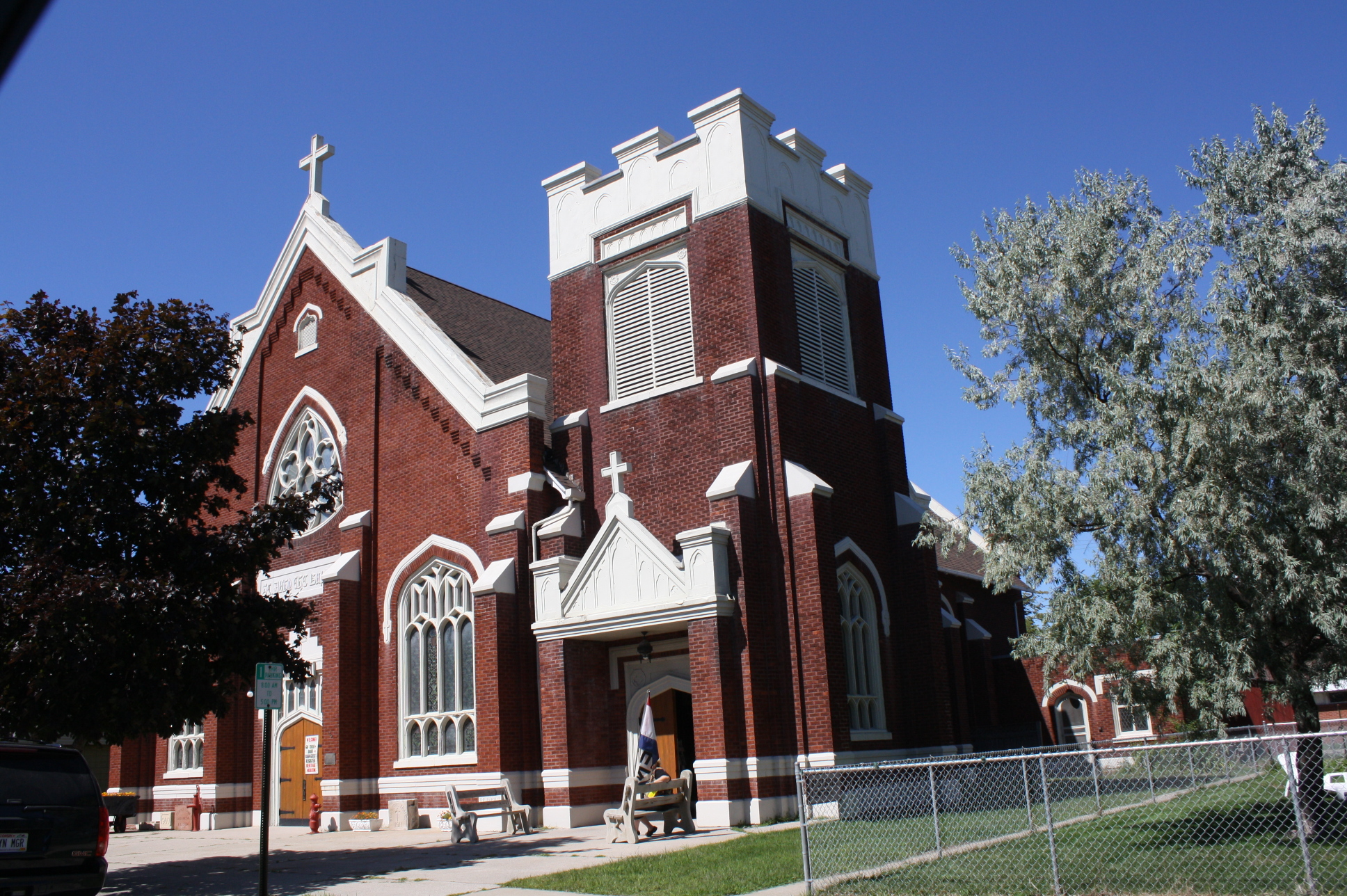

- Location within Michigan Location within the United States
- Interactive map
- Location: 904 11th Ave. Menominee, Michigan
- Coordinates: 45°6′32″N 87°36′48″W
- Area: less than one acre
- Architect: Derrick Hubert
- Architectural style: Late Gothic Revival
- NRHP reference No.: 95000865

Significant dates
- Added to NRHP: July 21, 1995
- Designated MSHS: February 23, 1981

St. John the Baptist Catholic Church, now used as the Menominee County Historical Museum, is a historic church at 904 11th Avenue in Menominee, Michigan. It was added to the National Register of Historic Places in 1995 and designated a Michigan State Historic Site in 1981.

== History ==
The St. John the Baptist parish in Menominee was the oldest religious organization on the Menominee River in Michigan. It was founded in 1872, and the first church building was completed in 1873. In 1919, the parish hired architect Derrick Hubert, a member of the parish, to design this church building as a replacement. The old church was demolished in 1921, and the new St. John the Baptist Church building was built in 1921–22. The church was used by the parish until parish mergers in 1972. In 1976, the Menominee County Historical Society purchased the building. The building is now used as the Heritage museum of the Menominee County Historical Society.

== Description ==
St. John the Baptist Catholic Church is a Late Gothic Revival building, constructed of red brick on a stone and reinforced-concrete foundation. The church has a gable roof, a square tower projecting from the facade, and a rectangular wing to the east. The water table, window sills, and hood moldings are constructed from concrete, while other decorative elements are made from galvanized iron. The front gabled facade of the church is divided into three sections by buttresses. The center section contains a Tudor-arch double door entrance, above which is a low, three-sided, pointed-arch window. The bays to each side contain single Tudor-arch windows. A five-sided apse at the rear of the building once housed the sanctuary. The stained glass windows in the church were reportedly made in Munich, Germany.

Inside, the central front entrance leads into a terrazzo-floored narthex; from there, there are three doors into the nave. The nave has a reinforced concrete floor and a ceiling which coves at the side walls and slopes upward toward the center from either side. A balcony projects from the rear. The former sanctuary floor is raised one step above the nave floor. The altars were removed when the church was closed, but the main altar's marble base remains. Most pews have been removed from the nave, and the space holds museum exhibits.
