= IXL Historical Museum =

- Wisconsin Land and Lumber Company Office Building
- U.S. National Register of Historic Places
- Michigan State Historic Site
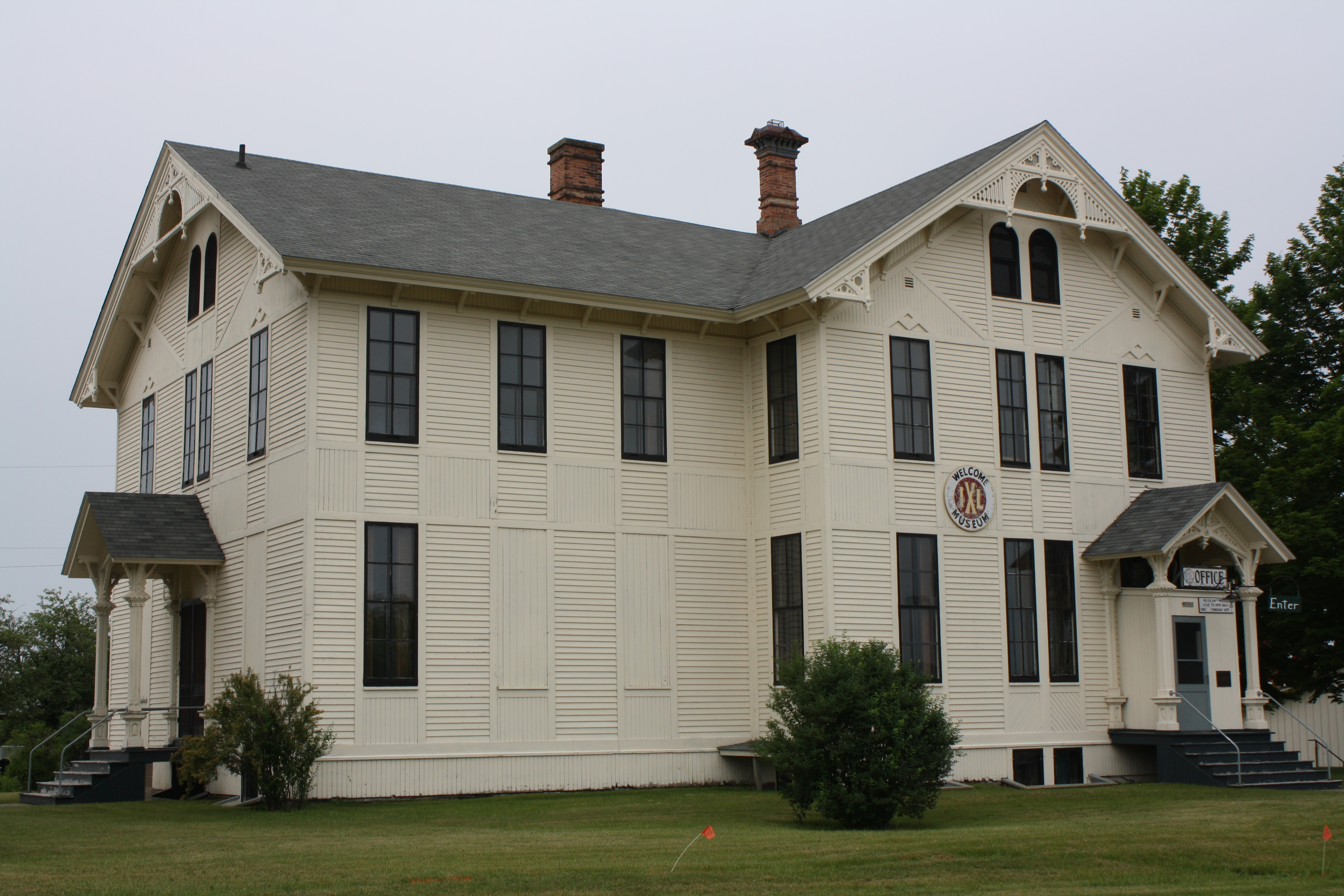

- Location within Michigan Location within the United States
- Interactive map
- Location: W5551 River Street North, Hermansville, Michigan
- Coordinates: 45°42′33″N 87°36′26″W
- Built: 1882
- Architectural style: Stick/Eastlake architecture
- NRHP reference No.: 91000901

Significant dates
- Added to NRHP: July 26, 1991
- Designated MSHS: December 11, 1973

The IXL Historical Museum is a historic office building, residence, and museum complex in Hermansville, Michigan, United States. The main building was constructed as the headquarters for the Wisconsin Land & Lumber Company before it became a museum. The museum was organized in 1982, and the main building, also known as the Wisconsin Land and Lumber Company Office, was designated a Michigan State Historic Site in 1973 and listed on the National Register of Historic Places in 1991.

== History ==
=== Origins ===
The building was the original office and headquarters for the Wisconsin Land & Lumber Company, a company founded by German-born cabinetmaker Charles J. L. Meyer. In the mid 19th century, Meyer had established a factory in Fond du Lac, Wisconsin making wooden sashes, doors, and blinds. In 1878, to acquire pine for his factory, Meyer began buying land in Menominee County, Michigan. In 1881–1882, Meyer moved company operations out of Fond du Lac into Michigan, and built the company's headquarters at the current site in Hermansville. Meyer continued purchasing land, and eventually the company owned nearly 100,000 acres (400 km^{2}) spread out over eight counties.

However, the company had overextended itself, and in 1890 the tightening credit market and reduction in sales forced Meyer to sell some of the company's assets. Most of the pine had been cut on Wisconsin Land & Lumber's holdings, and the company was forced to begin producing hardwood flooring. Wisconsin Land & Lumber is particularly notable for the firm's early interest in using hardwoods and for its development of machinery used to make flooring. The firm's flooring was called "IXL," a derivative of the words "I excel" which was the company's philosophy about the superior quality of their product. Every piece of flooring was stamped with the letters "IXL" inside a circle.

Unfortunately, the introduction of hardwood flooring was not an immediate success, and the company began falling apart. At the same time, Meyer suffered a brain hemorrhage from a riding accident which left him confused and unable to cope with running the company. Meyer's son-in-law, George Washington Earle, took over operation of the company.

=== George Washington Earle ===
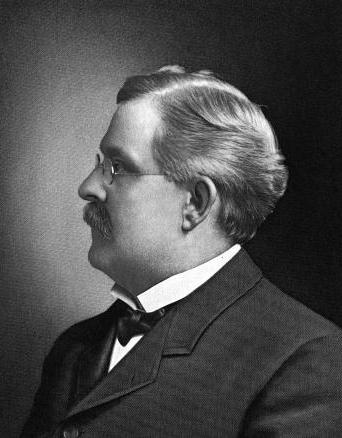
George Washington Earle, c. 1911

George Washington Earle was born in Truxton, New York in 1849. In 1851, his family moved to Huntley, Illinois, and when he was only ten years old George left home on his own. He hired out on a Wisconsin farm owned by Dr. Rollin S. Wooster in 1860, and in 1863 moved with Wooster to Iowa. Earle attended school, and eventually acquired enough education that he became a schoolteacher. However, he was unsatisfied, and in 1868 returned to New York and began doing piecework in a sash and door factory, continuing until he had saved enough money to attend medical college.

In 1872, Earle graduated from Buffalo Medical College, receiving his diploma from Millard Fillmore. He moved to Tully, New York, and began a medical practice, which over the next 17 years he built into a large and prosperous business. In 1886, Earle took a months-long trip to Europe, where he met Emma Meyer, Charles Meyer's daughter. They were married in 1888, and in 1889 Earle decided to retire from the rigors of practicing medicine, and moved with his wife to Michigan. Earle invested a considerable amount of his savings in his father-in-law's business, and was made a vice-president of Wisconsin Land & Lumber only months before the 1890 financial crash. With the other directors unable or unwilling to steer the company, the crash and Meyer's incapacitation forced Earle to take over the company's operations.

=== Earle's Tenure ===
Earle renegotiated with the company's creditors, raised new loans, and cut expenses to keep the company afloat. He bought up some of the company's debt personally and reorganized the business. Earle also promoted the company's IXL maple flooring, just in time for an upswing in demand. Wisconsin Land & Lumber developed a tongue in groove process which led to the company being the United States' largest hardwood floor producer at one time. The IXL logo became an industry benchmark, with architects specifying "IXL or equivalent" in contracts.

With the increase in demand for hardwood flooring, the company prospered. The last of the company's debt was finally retired in 1910. When timbered land became too expensive to purchase, Earle began buying logs from small jobbers. Earle remained at the helm of the company until his death in 1923, when control passed to his two sons, G. Harold and Stewart Prescott Earle. The site in Hermansville remained the firm's headquarters until the death of the last of Meyer's grandsons in 1978.

== Buildings ==
The main building contains artifacts from the 19th century with minimal changes from the 20th or 21st century. The structure is a two-story, wood-framed building with a T-shaped plan. The exterior is sheathed with clapboard siding, which is divided by horizontal and vertical stickwork aligned with the windows on the front and sides, as well as diagonal stickwork on the gables. Open triangular brackets support the eaves. Entrance doors on the front and side are accessed through small gabled porches. The rear of the building is sheathed with simple clapboard siding, with minimal ornamentation.

The building holds documents from the company which the public can view. Other items in the building include crank telephones, oak desks, dictaphones, inkwells, and adding machines. The paymaster's office is located near an entrance; workers were paid in company scrip which they could use to purchase items from the company store. The second story of the building was a residence.

The company built the town and the worker's houses until it sold them off after World War II. Other buildings still in the museum complex include a company house, the farm produce warehouse for Wisconsin Land & Lumber, and a restored train depot.

== Images ==
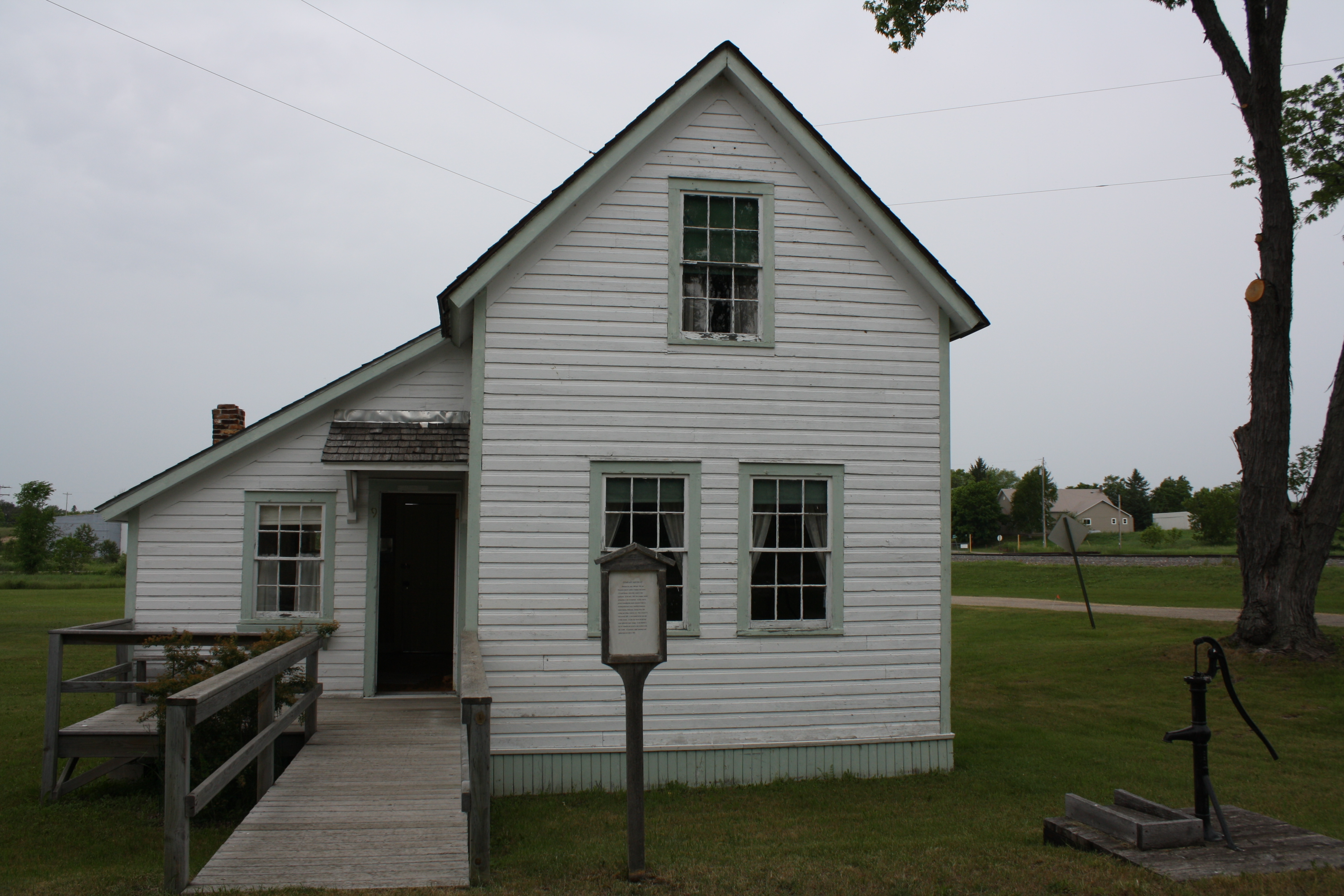
A typical worker's house

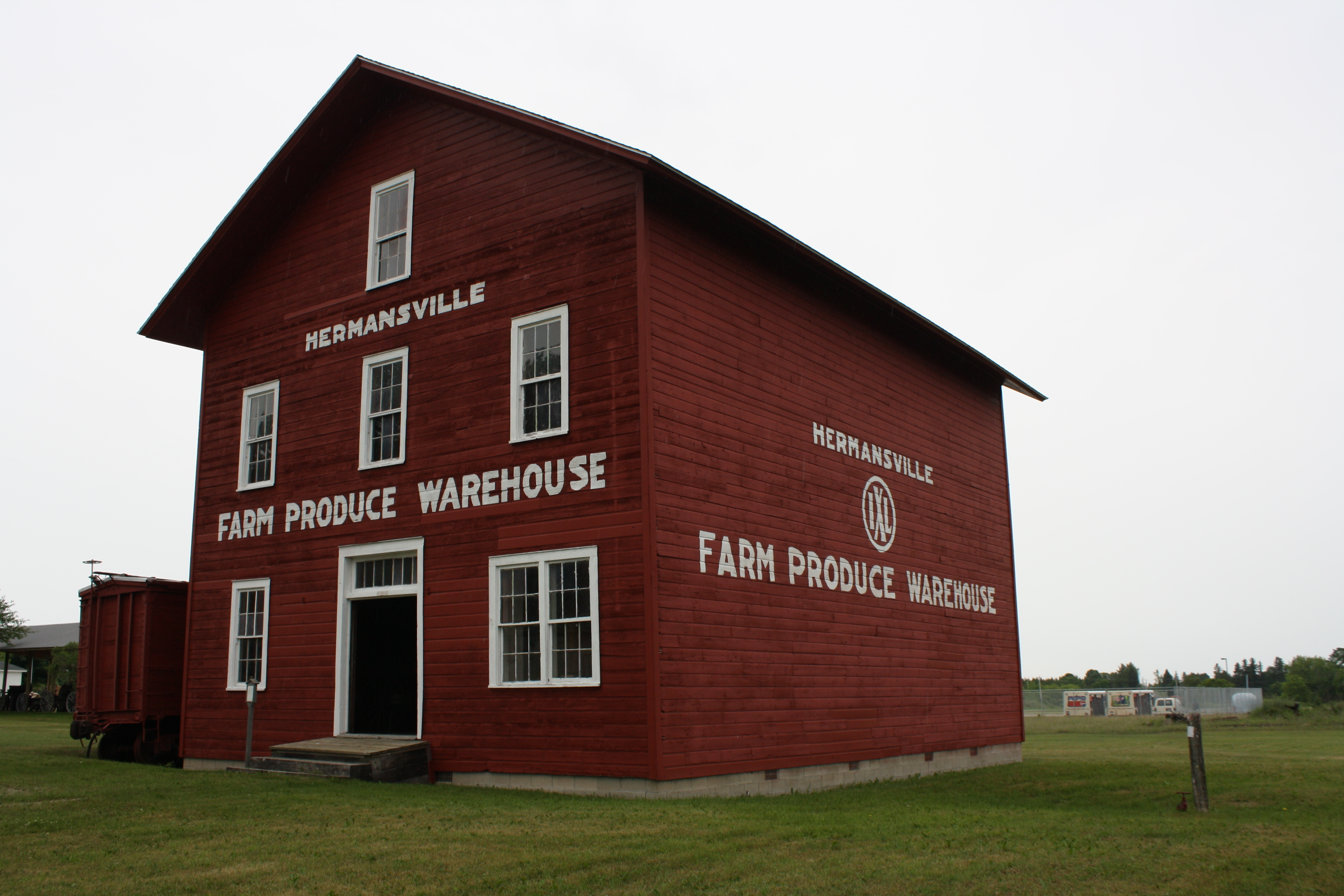
Wisconsin Land's warehouse

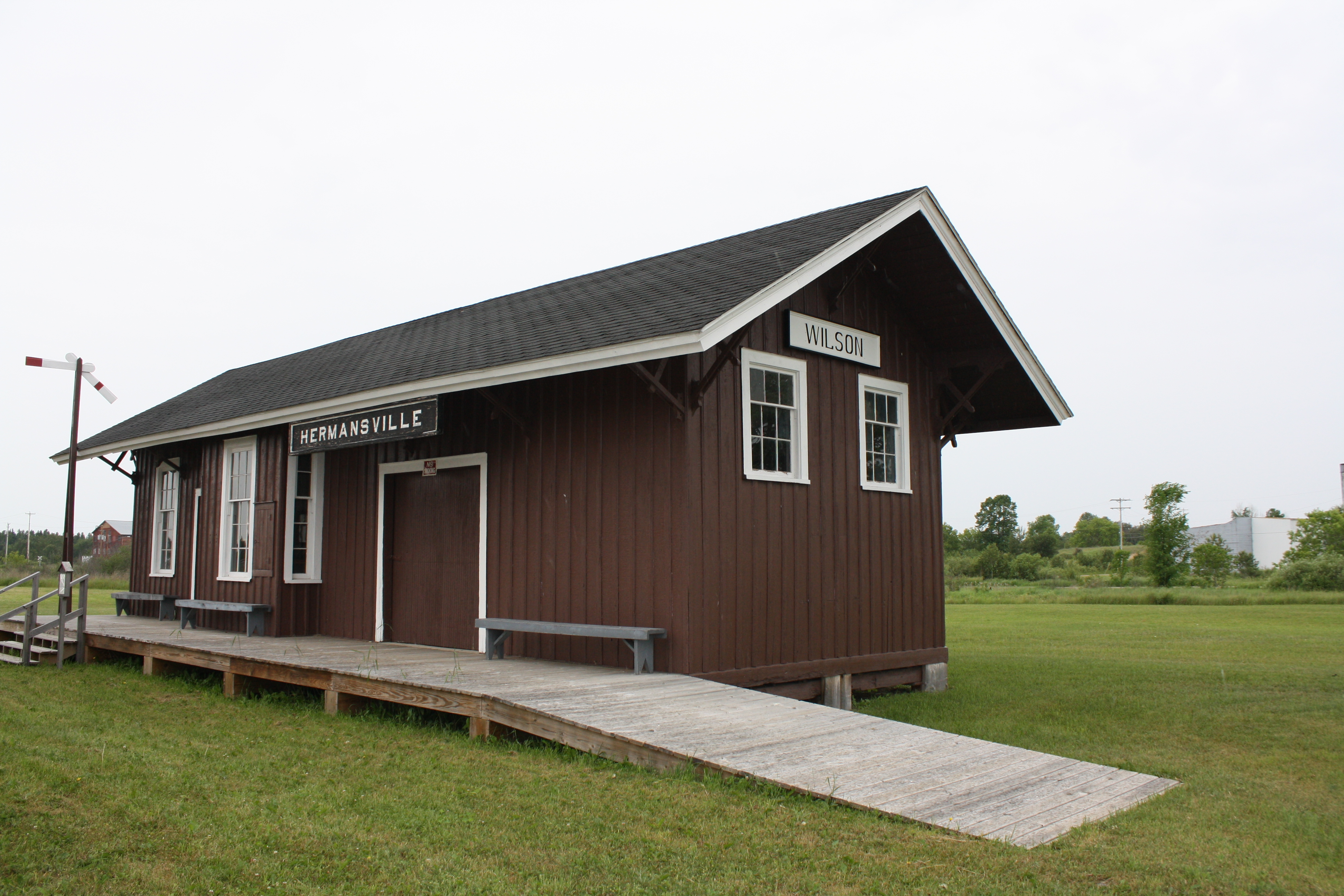
Wilson's train depot, later used at Powers

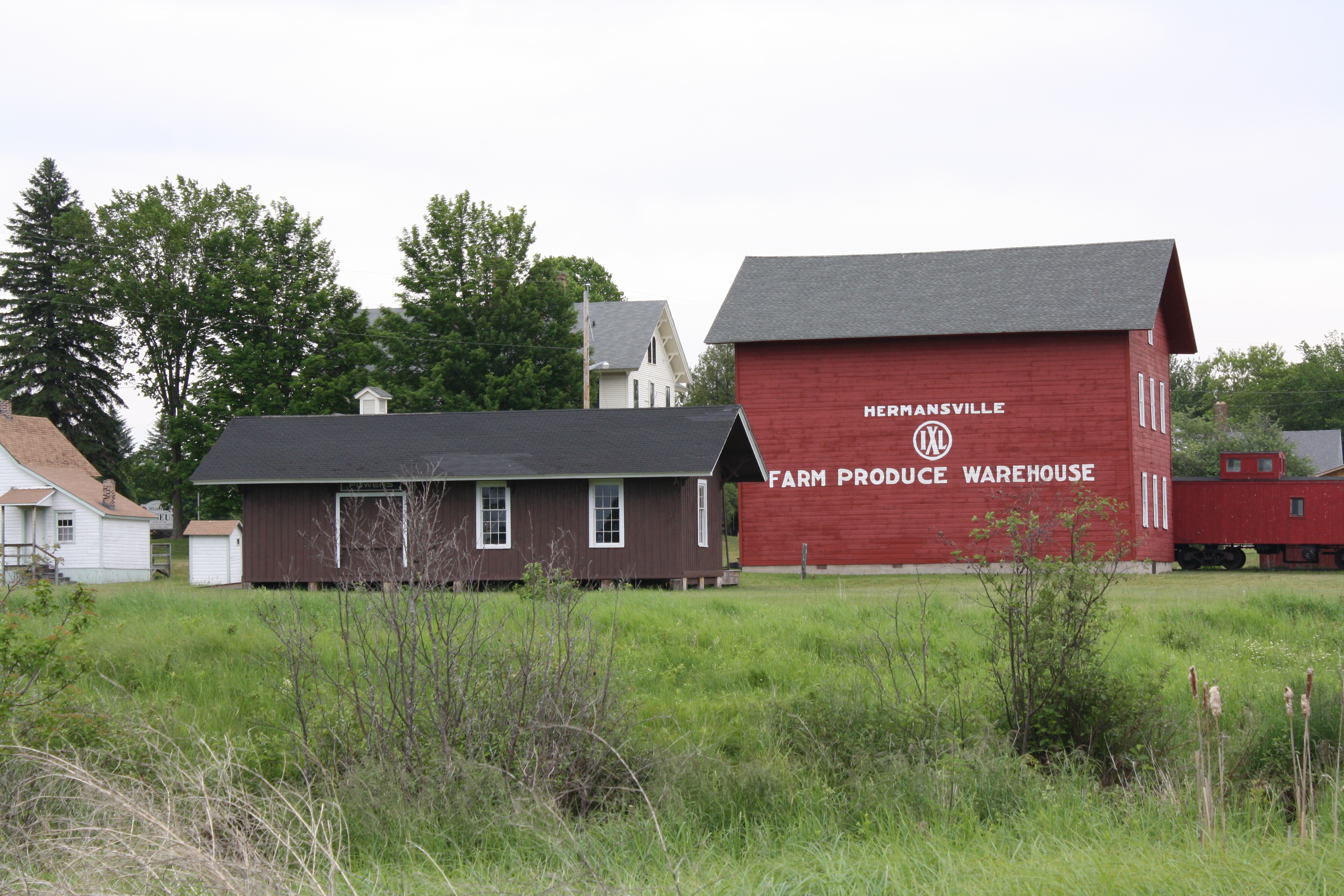
Panorama

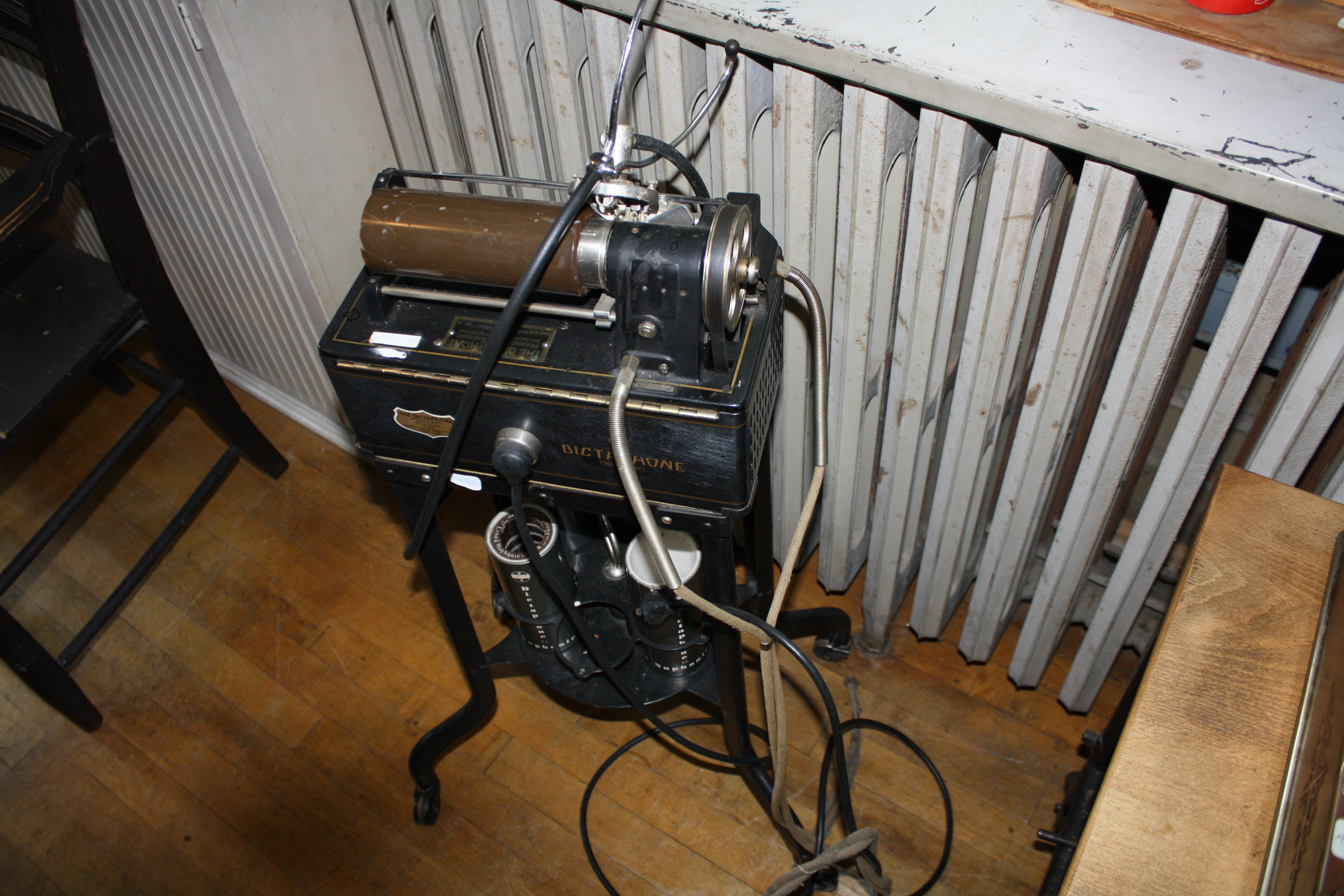
Dictaphone
