= Delaware and Hudson 1205 and 1216 =

Type and origin
- Power type: Diesel-electric
- Builder: Baldwin-Lima-Hamilton
- Serial number: 75316, 75372
- Model: RF-16
- Build date: December 1951 and January 1952
Specifications
- Configuration
  - AAR: B-B
  - UIC: Bo′Bo′
- Gauge: 4 ft 8 1/2 in (1,435 mm)
- Prime mover: 608A
- Engine type: Four-stroke diesel
- Aspiration: Turbocharged
- Displacement: 15,832 cu in (259.44 L)
- Generator: Westinghouse 471A
- Traction motors: Westinghouse 370G (4)
- Cylinders: Inline 8
- Cylinder size: 12.75 in × 15.50 in (324 mm × 394 mm)
- Gear ratio: 15:68
- Couplers: AAR Type E knuckle
Performance figures
- Power output: 1,625 hp (1.21 MW) (marketed as 1,600 hp)
Career
- Operators: New York Central, Monongahela Railway, Delaware and Hudson, Michigan Northern Railway, Escanaba and Lake Superior Railroad
- Numbers: NYC 3805 & 3816. NYC 1205 & 1216.
- Retired: April 1978 (excursion service)
- Current owner: Escanaba and Lake Superior Railroad
- Disposition: In storage, pending disposition

Delaware and Hudson 1205 and 1216 are two Baldwin RF-16 "Sharknose" locomotives originally built for the New York Central Railroad in 1951 and 1952. They are the final two remaining examples of the Baldwin RF-16.

== History ==
The locomotives were originally delivered to the New York Central Railroad (NYC), as units Nos. 3805 and 3816, and they were later renumbered in 1966 as Nos. 1205 and 1216, shortly before being traded in to General Electric. In 1967, they were among a group of RF-16s that were sold to the Monongahela Railway, where they entered coal drag service until 1972, by which point they were the only operable RF-16s left. That same year, the Monongahela traded their RF-16s to a scrap dealer, and Nos. 1205 and 1216 remained with them until 1974, when they were traded to the Delaware and Hudson Railway (D&H) in exchange for $6,000 worth of scrap boxcars.

The D&H had an ongoing commitment to operate older diesel locomotives, having previously acquired four retired ALCO PA-1s from the Santa Fe Railway, and the railway's then-president and CEO, Carl B. Sterzing Jr., authorized the purchase of the two RF-16s to remedy a power shortage on the D&H. Nos. 1205 and 1216 were subsequently overhauled and repainted into the D&H's blue and gold livery, and they were placed into mainline freight service. Nos. 1205 and 1216 quickly became popular with railfans, since they became the final remaining Baldwin "Sharknose" locomotives to survive and operate by that time.

In July 1975, the two RF-16s were sent to operate on the Lehigh Valley Railroad's line between Binghamton, New York and Sayre, Pennsylvania, since Railfan magazine was working on a story involving the line's history, and Railfan's editors were allowed to ride inside one of their cabs for one of the runs. Despite their incompatibility with EMD or ALCO locomotives, due to their air-powered throttles, the two RF-16s were also appreciated by D&H crews, who described their prime movers as having equal noise levels as John Deere tractors, but they also acknowledged that they were outclassed in speed and power by newer locomotives of the time.

In December 1977, the D&H decided to place Nos. 1205 and 1216 up for sale at $40,000, and then in April 1978, the two RF-16s were sold to an equipment leasing firm, the Castolite Corporation of Minneapolis, Minnesota, who in turn leased them to the Michigan Northern Railway later that same year. Damage to one of the cylinder heads, followed by damage to the crankshaft would put No. 1205 out of service. No. 1216 was also damaged while operating on the Michigan Northern, with one of its traction motors suffering a short circuit due to snow accumulation. No. 1205 was later sent for repairs by Castolite's mechanics, but the corporation would go out of business before repairs could be completed, and both units were sent into storage at the Escanaba and Lake Superior Railroad (ELS) of Escanaba, Michigan, where the railroad's owner, John Larkin, would eventually gain ownership of both units.

No. 1216 would operate twice on the Escanaba and Lake Superior, once in the summer of 1979, and again in the fall of 1982, before it suffered a crankshaft failure and was placed into storage alongside No. 1205 out of public access. A 2020 interview with John Larkin for Trains magazine indicated that both units would go to a museum upon his passing, but the museum he mentioned was not specified. On December 2, 2021, No. 1216 was moved out of the Escanaba storage building, in order to free up space for cleaning hopper cars and to avoid having its traction motors wet, and the locomotive has since been stored at another building in Wells, Michigan. No. 1205 remains in the Escanaba building as of November 4, 2023.
