= Baldwin DR-4-4-1500 =

- Missouri Pacific Railroad (MP) Baldwin DR-4-4-1500 "Babyface" units at Jefferson City, Missouri in 1953
Type and origin
- Power type: Diesel-electric
- Builder: Baldwin Locomotive Works
- Model: DR-4-4-1500
- Build date: November 1947 – June 1950
- Total produced: 105
Specifications
- Configuration
  - AAR: B-B
- Gauge: 4 ft 8 1/2 in (1,435 mm) standard gauge
- Trucks: AAR Type B
- Prime mover: 608SC
- Engine type: Four-stroke diesel
- Aspiration: Turbocharged
- Generator: Westinghouse 471A
- Traction motors: Westinghouse 370F (4)
- Cylinders: 8
- Gear ratio: 15:63
- Couplers: AAR type E knuckle
Performance figures
- Power output: 1,500 hp (1.12 MW)
Career
- Operators: Missouri Pacific, New York Central, Central Railroad of New Jersey, Pennsylvania Railroad, Elgin, Joliet and Eastern, Baltimore and Ohio
- Class: PRR- BF15/BF15a, NYC- DFA-4a, CNJ- FD-43
- Nicknames: Babyface / Sharknose
- Locale: North America
- Scrapped: 1962 (B&O, NYC, MP) 1963 (CNJ) 1966 (PRR)
- Disposition: All scrapped

The Baldwin DR-4-4-1500 was a 1,500-horsepower (1,100 kW) cab unit-type diesel locomotive built for freight service by the Baldwin Locomotive Works between November 1947 and June 1950. It was produced in two different body types, nicknamed the "Babyface" and "Sharknose" styles by railfans, though Baldwin used the same model number for both. 22 "Babyface" cab-equipped A units were built, along with 11 cabless booster B units; 36 "Sharknose" A units and 36 B units were constructed, making a total for all models of 105 locomotives built.

== Original buyers ==
=== "Babyface" units produced (1947–1948) ===
Image	Railroad	Quantity A units	Quantity B units	Road numbers A units	Road numbers B units	Notes
	Central Railroad of New Jersey	10	5	70–79	K, L, M, R, S	
	Missouri Pacific Railroad	8	4	201–208	201B–204B	
	New York Central Railroad	4	2	3400–3403	3700–3701	Renumbered 3800–3803 (A)
	Totals	22	11			

=== "Sharknose" units produced (1949–1950) ===
Pennsylvania Railroad DR-4-4-15 "Sharknose" units at Cincinnati, Ohio. Note the prominent side fuel fill, a signature feature.

Image	Railroad	Quantity A units	Quantity B units	Road numbers A units	Road numbers B units	Notes
	Baldwin Locomotive Works (demonstrators)	2	2	6001A, 6001A1	6001B, 6001B1	to Elgin, Joliet and Eastern Railroad #700A/#701A (A) #700B/#701B (B), then to Baltimore and Ohio Railroad 847, 849 (A) 847X, 849X (B), later 4200–4201 (A), 5200–5201 (B)
	Pennsylvania Railroad	34	34	9568A–9593A, 9700A–9707A	9568B–9593B, 9700B–9707B	9700A,B–9707A,B were equipped with Baldwin RF-16 bodies and Westinghouse 370G generator, and are therefore referred to by some as "RF-15s." 9583B repowered with an Alco 251B V12 prime mover in December 1959, renumbered 9632B. converted to mobile power unit by Sullian Trail Colliery in 1991, scrapped in 1992.
	Totals	36	36			
