= Milwaukee and Northern Railway =

Former railroad company in the midwestern USA

Milwaukee and Northern
Overview
- Dates of operation: 1870–1890

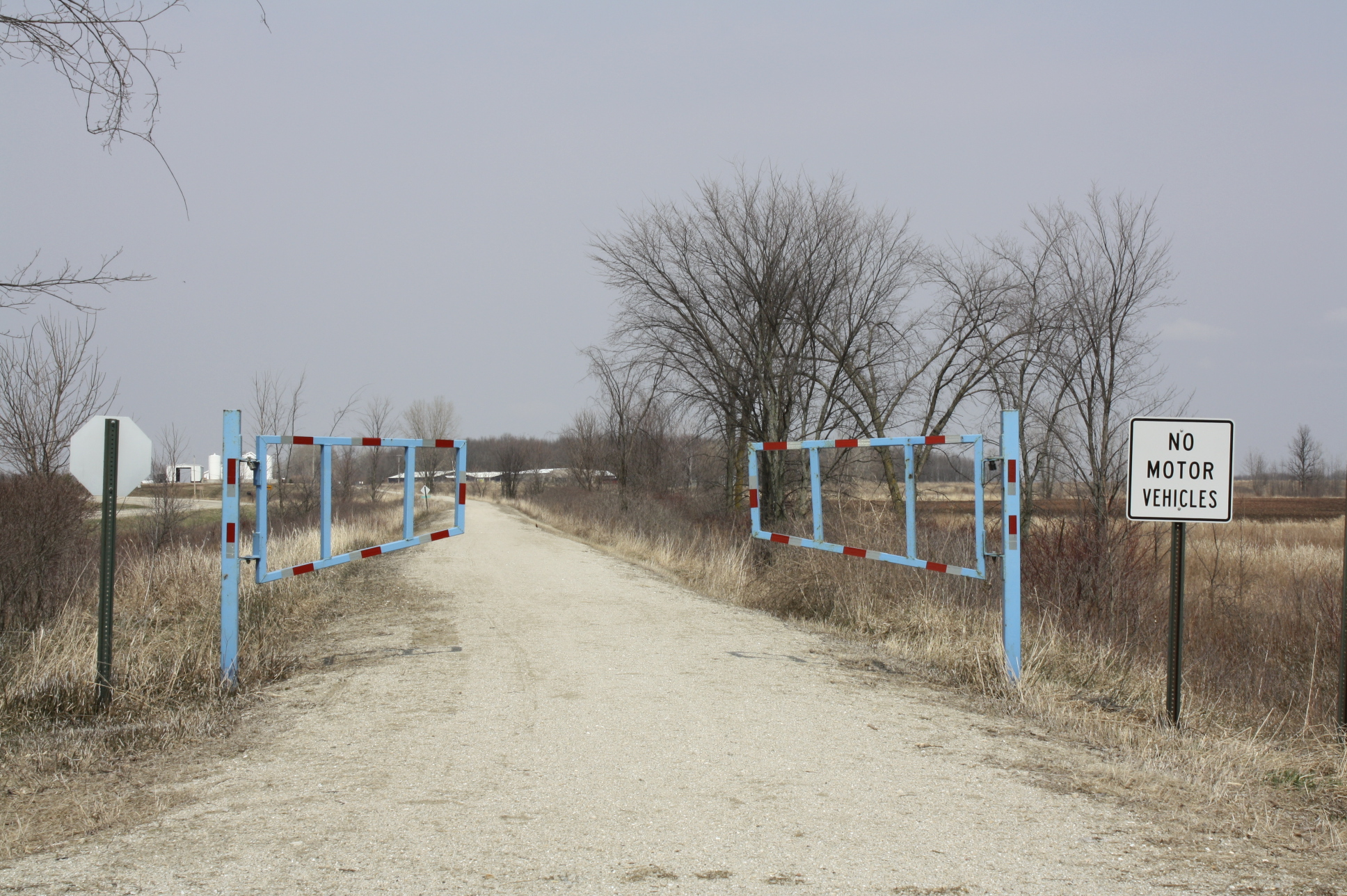
Site former tracks just north of Hilbert (now Fox River Trail)

The Milwaukee and Northern Railway Company (M&N) is a former railroad company that built a railroad connecting Milwaukee, Green Bay, and Michigan's Upper Peninsula.

== Founding to 1893 ==
The M&N was charted in February 24, 1870, and construction of the railway's mainline begun shortly after. By the end of 1870 the tracks stretched from North Milwaukee or Schwartburg to Cedarburg, and by 1873 the line had reached Green Bay by a route east of Lake Winnebago serving mostly small communities such as of Cedarburg, Plymouth, Hilbert, and Greenleaf. South of Milwaukee the M&N used Chicago Milwaukee and Saint Paul (Milwaukee Road) tracks to reach Chicago. In 1880, the M&N bought the Ontonagon & Brule River Railroad Company aka O & B completing their chartered route to Lake Superior. In 1899 the O & B completed the 46 mile line to Sidnaw, MI. On June 20 1890 the company was acquired by the Chicago Milwaukee and Saint Paul, but continued to operate as the M&N. In 1893 the line reached the southern shore of Lake Superior, and the same year it became its own division of the Milwaukee Road officially ending the M&N.

== Milwaukee Road ownership ==
The M&N mainline would continue to be used by the Chicago Milwaukee and Saint Paul successfully into the twentieth century carrying both freight and passenger trains such as the Copper Country Limited and The Chippewa. However, by the late twentieth century most of the passenger service had ended, and in 1977 the Chicago Milwaukee and Saint Paul went bankrupt. Over the coming decades, sections of the M&N mainline would either be abandoned or fall under the control of another railroad. Much of the section north of Green Bay was sold to the Escanaba and Lake Superior Railroad in 1980 and 1982 with other sections being abandoned. The section from Hilbert to Green Bay was abandoned and converted into the Fox River Trail ending the lines direct connection with Green Bay. The section between Hilbert and Milwaukee is owned by Canadian National, and Wisconsin and Southern and is used as a secondary freight only line serving local industry, Canadian National uses a route west of Lake Winnebago as its mainline to access Green Bay. The tracks used by the M&N between Milwaukee and Chicago continue to host passenger service, Amtrak's Hiawatha and Empire Builder both use the former M&N route between Milwaukee and Chicago, Metra also uses the same section for its commuter services on its Milwaukee District North Line.

== See also ==
- Ontonagon Railroad
