= Baldwin RF-16 =

First generation diesel-electric locomotive

RF-16
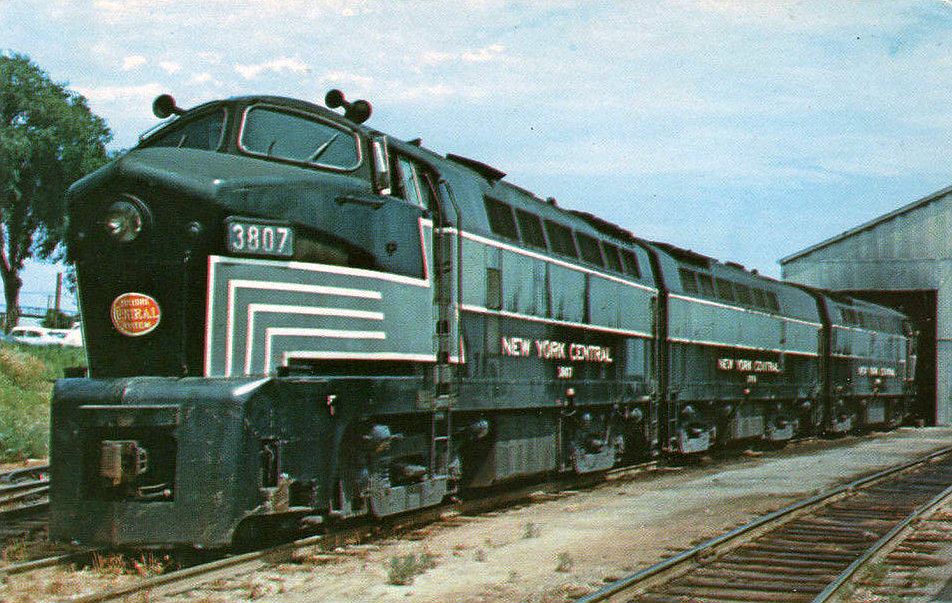
- New York Central 3807 with "B" unit 3703 and "A" unit 3806 at back, 1958
Type and origin
- Power type: Diesel-electric
- Builder: Baldwin-Lima-Hamilton Corporation
- Model: RF-16
- Build date: November 1950 – May 1953
- Total produced: 160
Specifications
- Configuration
  - AAR: B-B
  - UIC: Bo′Bo′
- Gauge: 4 ft 8 1/2 in (1,435 mm) standard gauge
- Trucks: 4 wheel
- Wheel diameter: 42 in (1.1 m)
- Minimum curve: 30 Degrees
- Wheelbase: 9 ft 10 in (3.00 m)
- Length
  - Over couplers: 54 ft 8 in (16.66 m) (RF-16A); 54 ft 10 in (16.71 m) (RF-16B)
- Width: 10 ft (3.0 m)
- Height: 15 ft (4.6 m)
- Loco weight: 266,000 lb (120,656 kilograms)
- Sandbox cap.: 20 ft^{3} (0.57 m^{3})
- Prime mover: 608A
- RPM range: 625 maximum
- Engine type: Four-stroke diesel
- Aspiration: Turbocharger Elliott Company H704 (125 hp)
- Displacement: 15,832 cu in (259.44 L)
- Generator: Westinghouse 471A
- Traction motors: Westinghouse 370G (4)
- Cylinders: Inline 8
- Cylinder size: 12 3/4 in × 15 1/2 in (324 mm × 394 mm)
- Transmission: Electric
- Gear ratio: 15:63 or 15:68
- Loco brake: Straight air
- Train brakes: Air
Performance figures
- Maximum speed: 65 mph (105 km/h) or 70 mph (110 km/h)
- Power output: 1,625 hp (1,211.76 kW) (marketed as 1,600 hp (1,200 kW))
- Tractive effort: 48,600 lbf (216.18 kN)
Career
- Operators: Baltimore and Ohio Railroad; Pennsylvania Railroad; New York Central Railroad; Elgin, Joliet and Eastern Railroad, Monongahela Railway; Delaware and Hudson Railway; Michigan Northern Railway; Escanaba and Lake Superior Railroad
- Class: PRR- BF16 NYC- DFA-8a
- Nicknames: Sharknose
- Locale: North America, Argentina (RF-16E)
- Retired: 1961 (B&O) 1965-1966 (PRR) 1967 (NYC)
- Preserved: Two (E&LS No. 1205 and 1216)
- Disposition: 2 stored, remainder scrapped.

The BLH RF-16 is a 1,625-horsepower (1,212 kW) cab unit-type diesel locomotive built for freight service by the Baldwin-Lima-Hamilton Corporation between 1950 and 1953. All RF-16s were configured with a B-B wheel arrangement and ran on two AAR Type B two-axle road trucks, with all axles powered. A total of 109 cab-equipped A units were built, along with 51 cabless booster B units, for a total of 160 locomotives built. Like most contemporary passenger locomotives, the RF-16s came equipped with a retractable, nose-mounted drop coupler pilot. Unlike competing units from EMD and Alco, the RF-16 used an air-powered throttle, meaning that it could not be run in MU operation with EMD or Alco diesels without special MU equipment.

Further, there were 51 RF-16s produced for use in Argentina for passenger service, bearing the designated RF-16E and riding on A1A trucks, i.e. three axles with the middle one unpowered. Three of these have survived, as of 2026, one being under restoration, one designated for parts, and one is operable and restored. These appear to have a slightly different car body shape, are slightly lighter, and gauged to broad gauge, but are mechanically identical to their United States counterparts, having the 608A prime mover, and being rated for 1,600 hp (1,200 kW).

== History ==
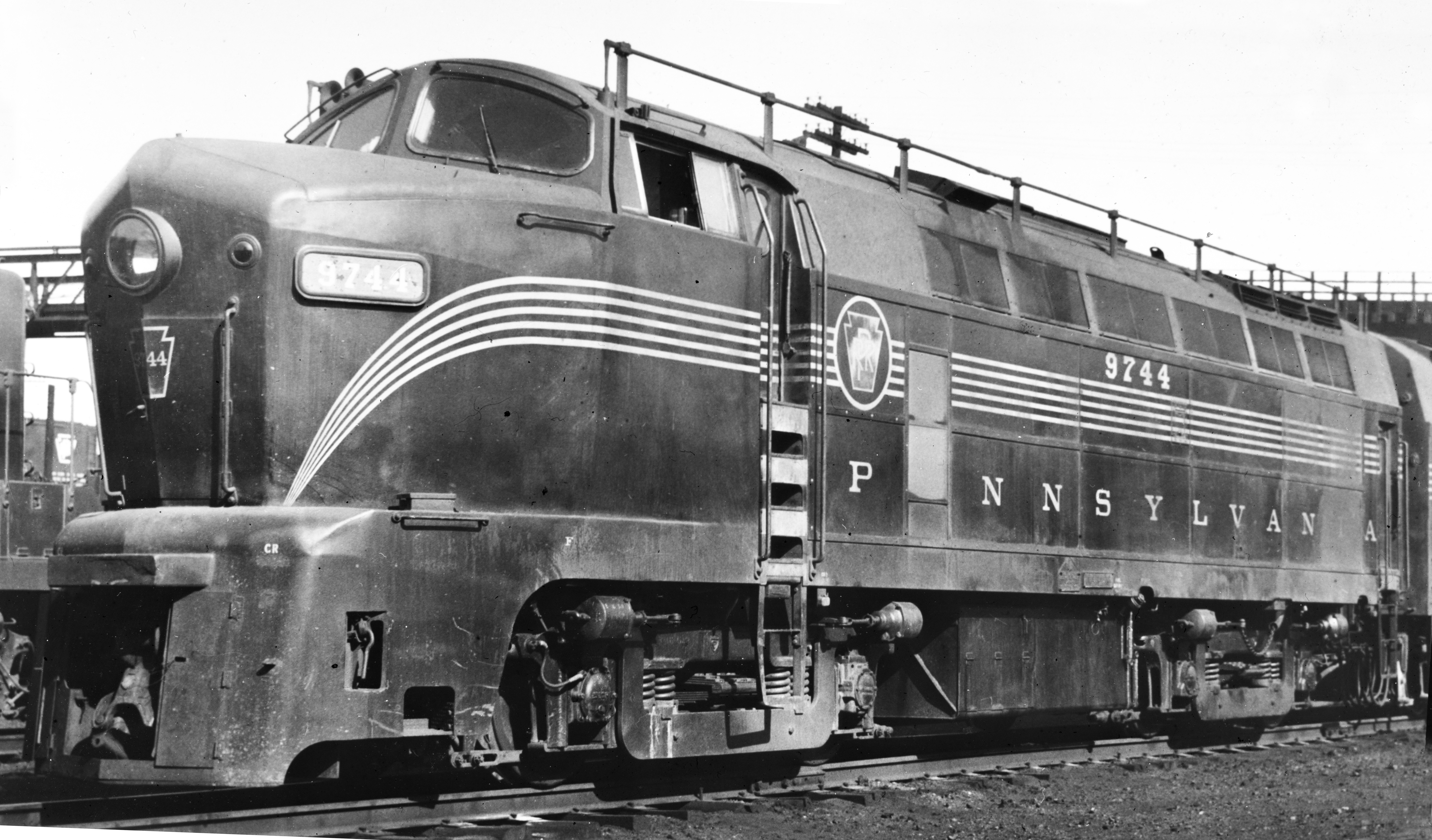
Pennsylvania Railroad No. 9744 is one example of a PRR RF-16. The PRR ordered 103 total RF-16s (A and B units)

In 1948, Baldwin began to apply a new "Sharknose" body style to its cab unit diesel locomotives. The goal of the new style was partly to differentiate Baldwin locomotives from competitors, and partly to distance the new locomotives from early Baldwin diesels that were plagued with mechanical problems. The style was inspired by the Pennsylvania Railroad's T1 class duplex steam locomotives, some of which were built by Baldwin. The first locomotives to receive the new styling was the DR-6-4-2000. When the RF-16 (essentially a "debugged" DR-4-4-1500 freight locomotive with a new prime mover) was introduced in 1950, it was given the new "Sharknose" styling.

The RF-16 quickly gained a reputation as a reliable and rugged locomotive with tough "lugging power." Many of the units saw service hauling coal drags, where these characteristics were put to best use. A pair of Pennsylvania Railroad RF-16s were repowered with ALCO prime movers in December 1959, with mixed results. The Baltimore and Ohio retired its Sharknoses as a class in 1962. In 1966, the Pennsylvania Railroad, the largest single owner of RF-16s, ceased use of the distinctive locomotives.

In 1967, the Monongahela Railway purchased seven A-units and two cabless B-units, the last remaining units from the New York Central's RF-16 fleet.

== Delaware and Hudson 1205 and 1216 ==
By August 1974, all but two of the Monongahela Railway units, Nos. 1205 and 1216, had been sold for scrap. The final pair were also to be scrapped, but were instead traded to the Delaware and Hudson Railway (D&H) in exchange for some boxcars of equal scrap value. Nos. 1205 and 1216 were used in freight service and in passenger excursion service on the D&H until 1978.

In April that year, they were purchased by the Castolite Corporation, an equipment leasing firm. The two diesels were leased for use on the Michigan Northern Railway in 1979 before being moved to the Escanaba and Lake Superior Railroad (ELS). The ELS used No. 1216 for a short time in mid-1979, and then again in the fall of 1982, but its crankshaft broke shortly thereafter. Both Nos. 1216 and 1205 have been stored since that time on ELS property in Escanaba and Wells, Michigan, inaccessible to the public.

On January 10, 2020, Trains magazine reported that the two surviving units will be going to a museum for preservation, but a subsequent 2021 reporting revealed that a full restoration was economically unfeasible at that time.

On December 2, 2021, the No. 1216 was moved from storage in Escanaba to a shop at the railroad's headquarters in Wells, to free up space for hopper car-cleaning at the Escanaba car shop.

== Original buyers ==
Image	Railroad	Quantity A units	Quantity B units	Road numbers A units	Road numbers B units	Notes
	Baltimore and Ohio Railroad	19	12	851, A–865, A (odd), 867–871 (odd)	851X–861X, 865X, 867X, AX–871X, AX (all odd)	Renumbered 4202–4220 (A); 5202–5214 (B) not in order
	New York Central Railroad	18	8	3804–3821	3702–3729	Renumbered 1204–1221 (A) in September 1966
	Pennsylvania Railroad	72	31	2000A–2027A, 9594A–9599A, 9708A–9745A	2000B–2026B, 9594B–9598B, 9708B–9598B, 9708B–9714B (all even)	2001A and 9726A repowered with ALCo V12 251B in December 1959, renumbered #9632A-9633A.
	Totals	109	51			

== See also ==
- Delaware and Hudson 1205 and 1216
- A History of the Michigan Northern and the Last Two Remaining Sharks by Alex Huff
- Who owned/operated Sharks (Baldwin RF-16)?
- Marre, Louis A. (1995). Diesel Locomotives: The First 50 Years. Kalmbach Publishing Co., Waukesha, WI. ISBN 978-0-89024-258-2.
- Pinkepank, Jerry A. (1973). The Second Diesel Spotter's Guide. Milwaukee, WI: Kalmbach Publishing Co. ISBN 978-0-89024-026-7.
- ""Baldwin Sharknose: A History" by Jay Winn & John Shaw". The Bridgeline Historical Society. Archived from the original on 2006-01-11.
- ""E-R N scale Baldwin RF-16 sharknosed diesel locomotives:Product Review" by Paul Schmidt". Model Railroader Magazine, April 2002 Edition. Archived from the original on September 29, 2007.
