= Escanaba and Lake Superior Railroad =

Railroad company operating in Wisconsin and Michigan

Escanaba and Lake Superior Railroad Company
- "Easy, Lazy & Slow."
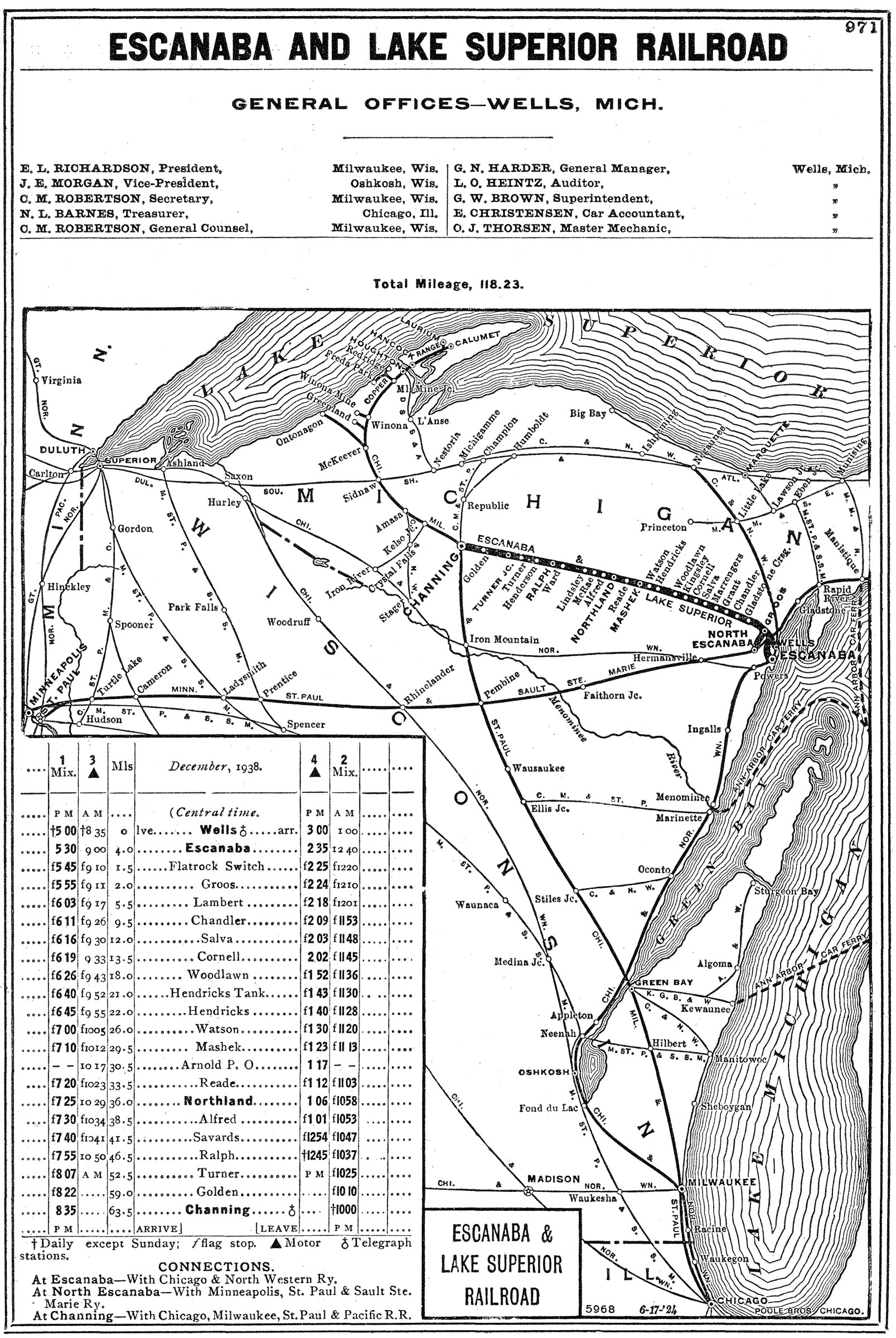

Overview
- Headquarters: Wells, Michigan
- Founders: John C. Larkin, Wade W. Larkin, Avis K. Larkin
- Reporting mark: ELS
- Locale: Wisconsin, Upper Peninsula of Michigan
- Dates of operation: 1888–present
- Predecessor: Escanaba & Lake Superior Railway

Technical
- Track gauge: 4 ft 8 1/2 in (1,435 mm) standard gauge
- Length: 347 miles (558 km)
- Operating speed: 25–35 mph (40–56 km/h)

Other
- Website: elsrr.com

The Escanaba & Lake Superior Railroad (reporting mark ELS) is a Class III shortline railroad that operates 254.1 miles (408.9 km) of track in Northeastern Wisconsin and the Upper Peninsula of Michigan. Its main line runs 208 miles (335 km) from Rockland, Michigan, to Green Bay, Wisconsin, and it also owns various branch lines and out-of-service track. In 1897, the Escanaba River Company built a seven-mile (11 km) railroad from Wells, Michigan, to tap a large hardwood timber stand at LaFave’s Hill. In 1898, the company name was changed to the Escanaba & Lake Superior Railway (E&LS).

== History ==
=== Founding to 1978 ===
Isaac Stephenson, Jefferson Sinclair, Daniel Wells Jr., Harrison Ludington, and Nelson Ludington were the founders of the N. Ludington Company. It was again renamed to the I. Stephenson company when Isaac Stephenson became majority owner in the same year. The N. Ludington Company became part of this company, and along with being rebranded as the Escanaba River Company, became a subsidiary of this new company in 1888. The Escanaba River Co. constructed 7 miles (11 km) to connect the company to hardwood reserves west of Wells and Escanaba. Work began in 1898 to extend the track 31 miles (50 km) from Wells northwest to Watson, Michigan and was completed in 1899.

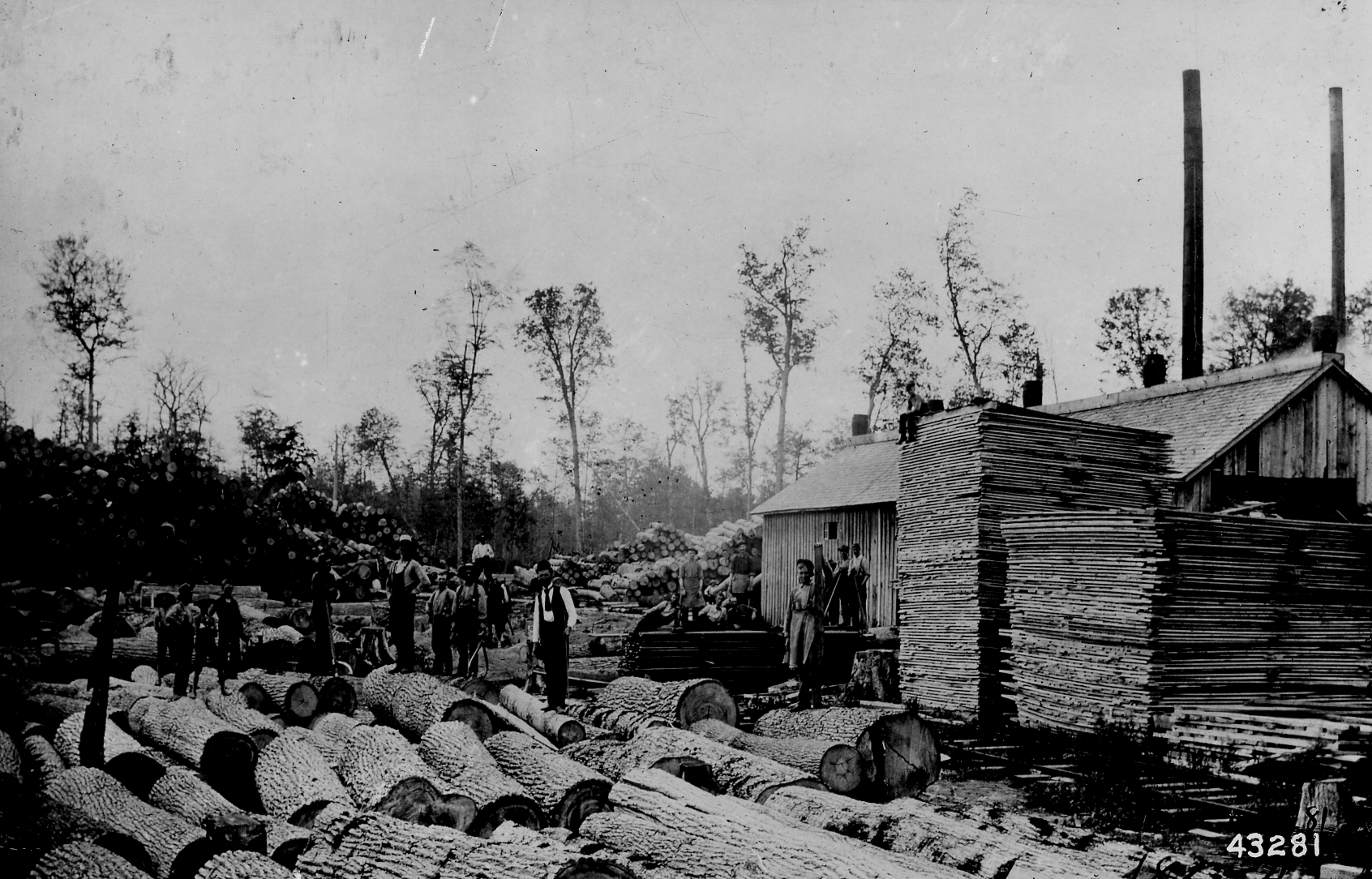
An example of the Hardwood logging on the early components of the E&LS

A branch line referred to Ford River was constructed in 1899 from Watson for a distance of 8.7 miles (14.0 km). This branch was abandoned in 1910. In 1902, the E&LS built three miles (4.8 km) of track southeast out of Wells into the center of Escanaba.

From 1900 to 1903, the railroad extended the mainline track 31.8 miles (51.2 km) to Channing. This established a connection with the Chicago, Milwaukee, St. Paul and Pacific Railroad (component of the Milwaukee Road).

On February 12, 1900 the E&LS signed a trackage rights agreement with the Milwaukee Road which allowed them to reach their own ore docks built north of Escanaba. As part of this trackage rights agreement with the Milwaukee Road, the E&LS Railway was reincorporated as the Escanaba and Lake Superior Railroad on February 12, 1900; it has used this name ever since. This agreement was ended March 15, 1937.

At this point in the railroad's history, it had connections to both major Class 1 railroads that existed at the time in the UP (the Chicago and North Western and the Milwaukee Road) and was able to diversify its traffic base. This diversification included the Milwaukee Road ore trains From the Groveland mine and the Iron River mines, bound for the Milwaukee ore docks in Escanaba. The railroad also chartered a mixed passenger train that ran along the existing route up until the late 1950s. This service included run-through mail and express from the Milwaukee Road, and passengers bound north from the Chicago & North Western.

Starting in 1901 and continuing into 1902, a branch line was constructed from Northland for 10.9 miles (17.5 km) to the Escanaba River. Between 1902 and 1903, the Northland line was extended from the Escanaba River to Kates, a distance of 3.28 miles (5.28 km). The northernmost portion of this branch that extended 6.1 miles (9.8 km) from Gleason, Michigan was abandoned June 7, 1922. This branch was abandoned in 1939.

Other branch lines were built by the E&LS to get out the remote timber stands: Ralph, Turner (1911–1912), Mashek, Michigan, and Hendricks, Michigan (1915). These branches totaled more than 100 miles (160 km) of combined branch trackage and sidings. The railroad peaked at 80.9 miles (130.2 km) of mainline and 70.8 miles (113.9 km) of yard and sidings on June 30, 1918.

By 1935 the Milwaukee’s docks at Escanaba had deteriorated to the point a large expense was needed to repair them. On March 15, 1937, the Milwaukee Road ended its trackage rights of its ore trains off the E&LS and entered into an agreement with the Chicago & North Western (C&NW) to jointly operate what was known as the Menominee Ore Pool Agreement trains into Escanaba. Though the E&LS petitioned the Interstate Commerce Commission (ICC) and later the U.S. Supreme Court to be allowed to join the joint operations, it was blocked from doing so in 1938 by the US District Court of Appeals.

In the 1940s, two major sources of traffic were developed near Escanaba: The Harnischfeger Corporation, which built large cranes for mining operations, and the Escanaba Paper Company. The railroad's transportation of logs to Wells ended in 1943 with the closure of the Stephenson mill. In the early 1960s, the E&LS was purchased by the Hanna Mining Company.

In 1969, the E&LS stopped serving the Escanaba Paper Company during a strike (July 1, 1969) at the mill; in response, the mill's owners built a new connection to the C&NW and Soo Line and cut car movements on the E&LS more than five-fold in two years, from 2,200 carloads in 1968 to 449 in 1970. The E&LS continued skeleton service during the 1970s. In 1978, Hanna requested permission from the ICC to abandon the railroad.

=== 1978 to 2005 ===
On October 6, 1978, Hanna Mining Company sold the E&LS Railroad to John Charles Larkin and his father Wade W. Larkin, businessmen from Minneapolis who had organized a National Railway Historical Society passenger excursion on the railroad earlier in the decade. He planned to return the railroad to profitability by reducing labor costs and entering the business of leasing boxcars to other railroads. Shortly thereafter, the boxcar leasing market collapsed. Additionally, with the Milwaukee Road going bankrupt in 1977, it planned to abandon its trackage in Michigan, consisting largely of a route between Ontonagon and Green Bay, Wisconsin. This plan would break the E&LS's connections at Channing, as well as end rail service to the shippers on the Milwaukee Road lines. One of these shippers, Champion Paper, which operated a mill in Ontonagon, approached the E&LS with a proposal for the railroad to buy the Milwaukee Road track to Ontonagon.

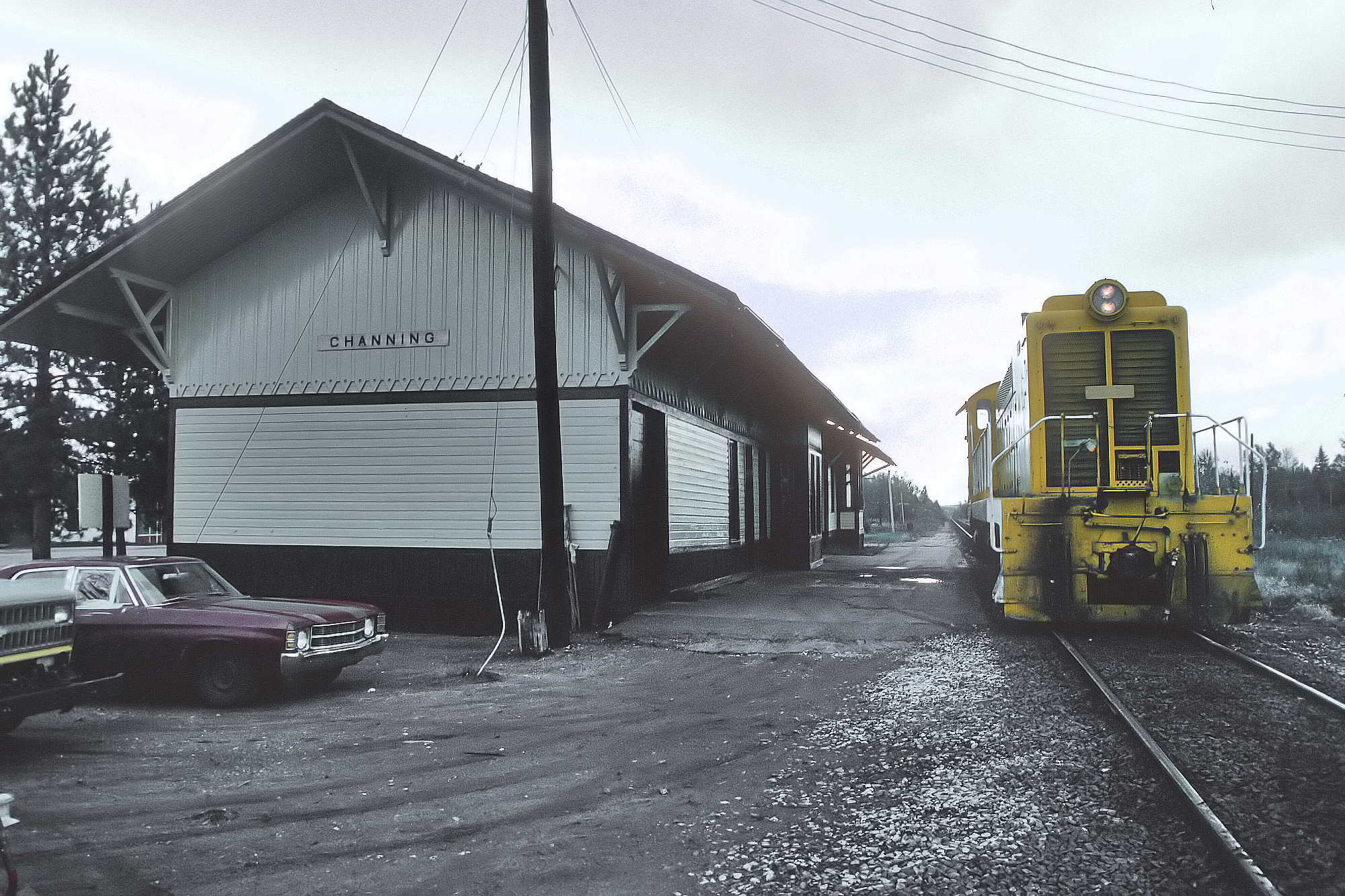
E&LS Baldwin #207 at Channing, MI on October 5, 1988.

=== Purchasing ex-Milwaukee Road, C&NW, and Soo Line trackage ===
These recent branch line acquisitions are used by the E&LS to store rolling stock for third parties.

The E&LS was able to reach an agreement with Milwaukee Road's bankruptcy court to take control of the Ontonagon route, as well as additional trackage south. They were backed by many of the line's shippers and the states of Michigan and Wisconsin, but opposed by the C&NW, which wanted to retain iron ore transport from the Groveland Mine in Randville, Michigan, and Hanna Mining, the former owner of the E&LS and owner of the Groveland Mine. The C&NW and Milwaukee Road had previously shared service to the Groveland Mine under a decades-long agreement between the two, called the Menominee Range Iron Ore Pool. By 1979, the mine impacted 31,000 of the 50,000 cars moved over the Milwaukee Road's tracks in the area, a level of traffic so high that Larkin publicly stated that the E&LS would not make a profit without it. The ICC, and a US court, ruled in E&LS' favor.

On March 10, 1980, the E&LS formally bought the ex-Milwaukee Road between Ontonagon through Channing south to Iron Mountain. It also obtained a lease-to-own agreement of the tracks south from Iron Mountain to Green Bay; this section was purchased in 1982. Upon purchase, the E&LS immediately began rebuilding its new trackage, which had been neglected by the Milwaukee Road in the years leading up to its bankruptcy. Major funding came from the state of Michigan, which paid $1.6 million (equivalent to $5.24 million in 2025) to install new ties on the track to Ontonagon.

In April 1983 the E&LS RR and the Northeast Wisconsin Railroad Commission signed an agreement to rehabilitate 50 miles (80 km) of track between Green Bay and Crivitz. This agreement called for $2.27 million in federal and local funds. The Federal Railroad Administration share was $1,231,873 with the E&LS contributing $1.25 million (45%). This project's target was to improve this segment of track's conditions to meet FRA Class 2 standards (25 mph).

In November 1981, the E&LS bought additional trackage, this time a branch line from Channing north to Republic. In 1985, it bought a branch from Crivitz, Wisconsin, on the Green Bay line, east to Marinette, Wisconsin, and Menominee, Michigan. During 1987 and 1988, the line to Ontonagon had its lightweight rails replaced with new, heavier rails.

In 1986, the E&LS connection track to the C&NW RR was built from a switch just south of Lineville Road in Howard, Wisconsin, to the C&NW Railroad's Howard Industrial Park siding line. This ultimately allowed the E&LS to discontinue operations south of Bond Street in Green Bay in 1993. This connection was the result of a construction agreement between the E&LS and the C&NW that was executed on November 27, 1985, which provided joint access to the Howard Industrial Park. Two of the contracts executed then allowed tenants of Howard Industrial Park a choice of competing railroads for shipping service. This also allowed the E&LS to eliminate the unproductive end of their main line east of Bond Street c. 1999, then stubbed it off in September 2007, and finally the track was removed from Bond Street to the Oakland Avenue Intermodal Yard in Green Bay.

On June 24, 1991, E&LS bought a 23-mile (37 km) ex-Soo Line (ex-Duluth, South Shore & Atlantic) branch line from Sidnaw, on the Ontonagon line, east to Nestoria.

The following year (1992), the E&LS mainline was taken out of service, currently a segment from Chandler, Mi. to Ralph, Mi. is OOS. Access to Escanaba was retained via a new trackage rights agreement with the Wisconsin Central Railroad (now Canadian National Railroad), under which the E&LS was granted access their main line from Pembine, Wisconsin, to North Escanaba.

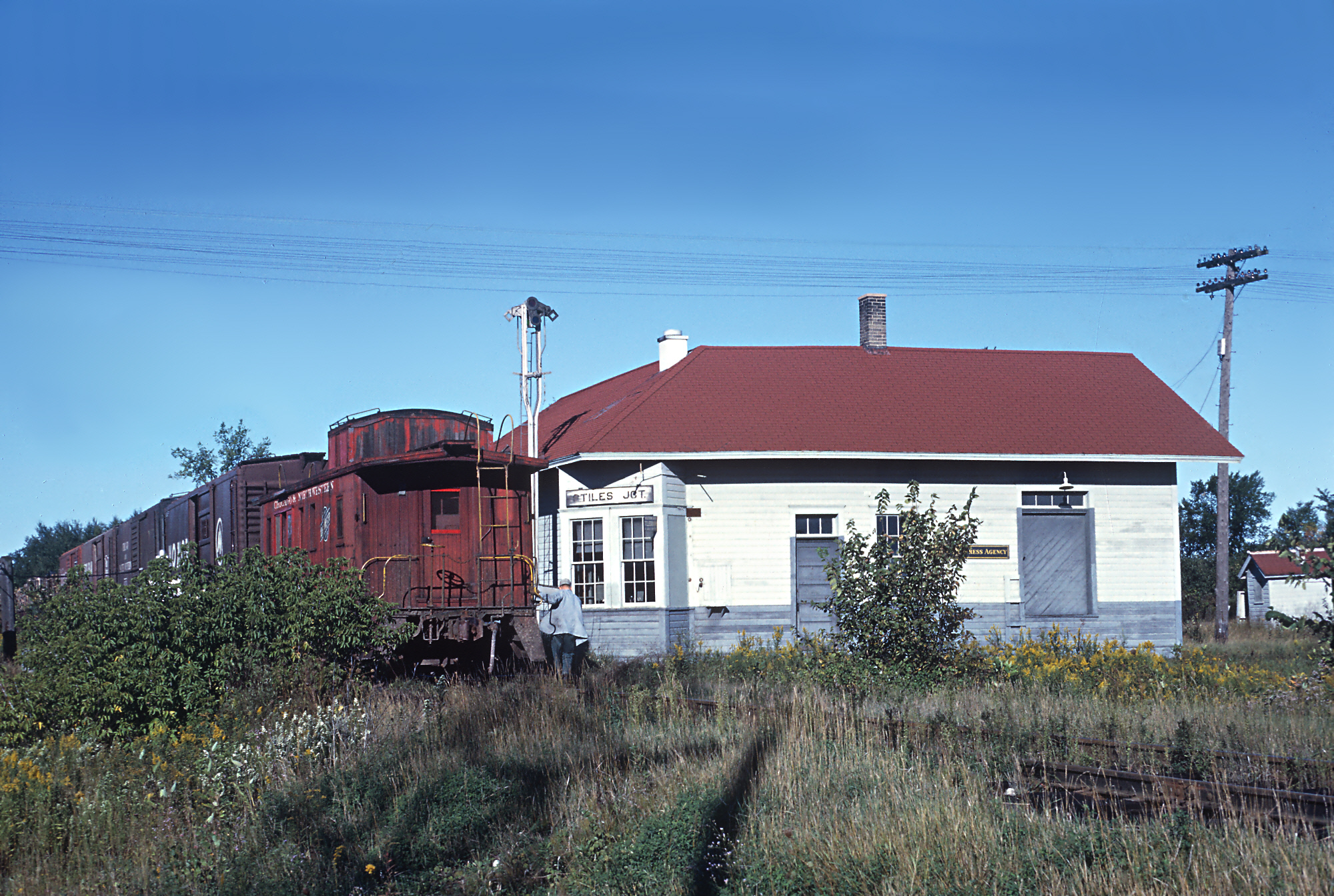
A Chicago and North Western freight train passes Stiles Junction, Wisconsin in September 1964.

==== Oconto Falls branch ====
On April 20, 1995, the Escanaba and Lake Superior Railroad bought the 4.7 mile branch line between Stiles Junction, Wisconsin, just north of Green Bay, to Oconto Falls, Wisconsin from the C&NW. The Union Pacific (ex C&NW) line east of Stiles Junction, Wisconsin, to Oconto, Wisconsin, was abandoned on December 3, 1996.

=== Post-2005 and track closures ===
In 2005, the Wisconsin Department of Transportation provided a $2.01 million (equivalent to $3.18 million in 2025) grant to rebuild E&LS trackage from Crivitz north to the Michigan state line. This was the last section of mainline track that had not seen a complete rebuild since it was bought in 1980.

After the closure of the Smurfit-Stone Paper Mill in Ontonagon in 2009, the Escanaba and Lake Superior abandoned 13 miles (21 km) of track between Ontonagon and milepost 395 one mile east of Rockland in 2011, severing the railroad's closest trackage to Lake Superior. The remaining track between Rockland and Mass City is used for third-party long term car storage. The sidings between Escanaba & Channing are used for long term car storage. The E&LS and the Michigan Department of Natural Resources consummated a rail banking/interim trail use agreement on or about October 28, 2014, for the abandoned portion of the E&LS rail line between milepost 395 at Rockland and Ontonagon. The abandoned segment is now the Ontonagon to Rockland Trail.

=== LP Building Solutions - Sagola ===
In 2021 LP Building Solutions (LP) announce it would convert their Sagola, Mi plant from the manufacturing of OSB to SmartSide siding. This will allow the Sagola plant to produce around 330 million square ft of SmartSide siding per year. The project is additionally supported by a $325,000 Michigan Business Development Program performance-based grant. LP has invested $194 million in Sagola. This is one of the largest projects ever supported by the MSF in the Upper Peninsula. LP Building Solutions in Dickinson County, has operated in Sagola since 1988. The first production of SmartSide at Sagola was on March 15, 2023.

=== Track Removal ===
In August-September of 2026, Tracks were removed from Rockland, MI to Sidnaw, MI, starting near milepost 365 west of Sidnaw, MI. 29.9 miles of track will be going to extending the Ontonagon to Rockland Trail as well as Channing to Wells, for a total of 63.5 miles of track.

Michigan DNR is currently in negotiations with the E&LS to purchase the scrapped portion of the Well line and the recently scrapped Sidnaw to Rockland line.

== Rolling stock ==
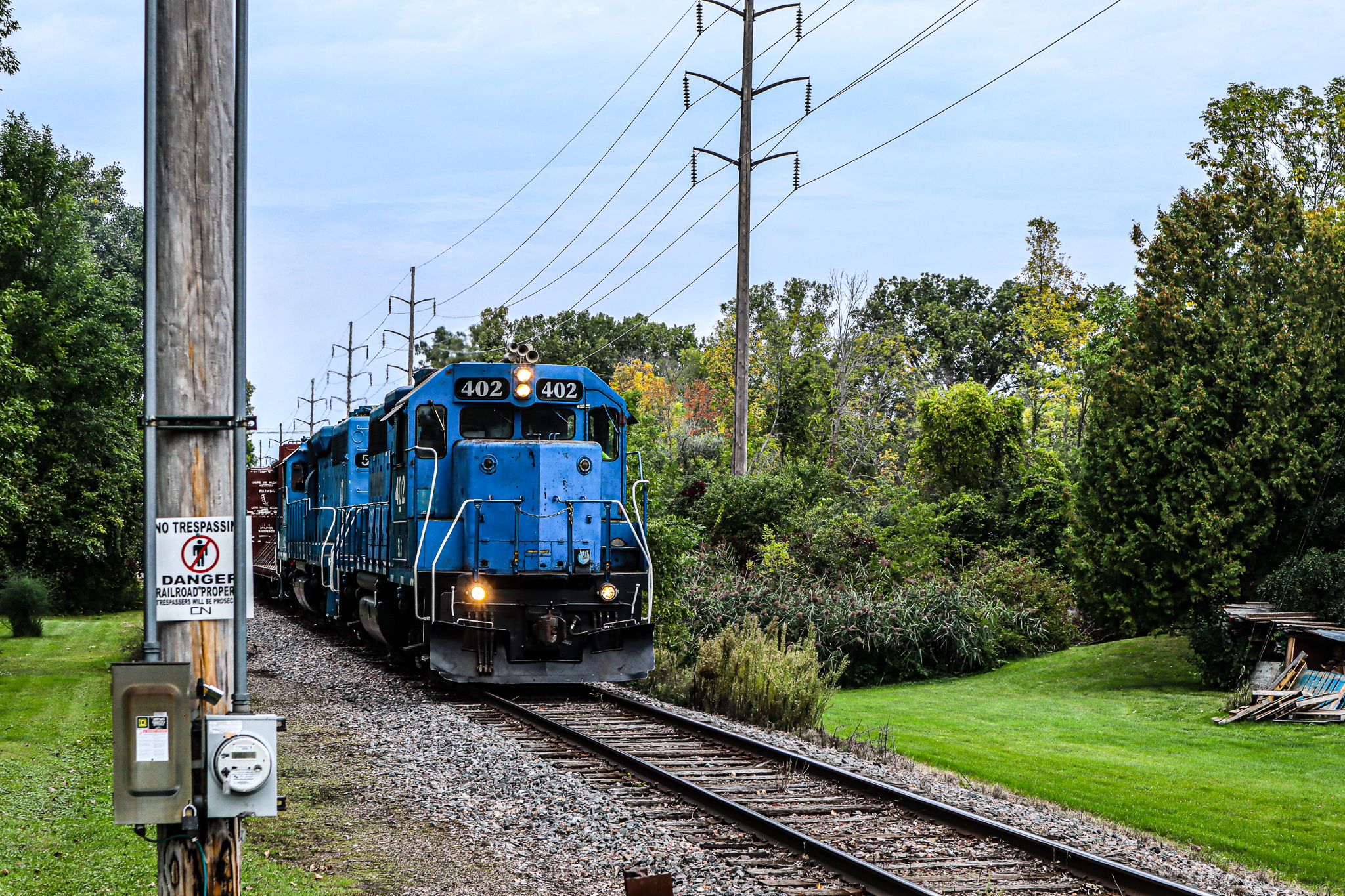
ELS 402 and 501 pull a long cut of cars into CN's Green Bay yard on September 12, 2021

The E&LS has been running a private passenger excursion yearly for invited guests and online customers since exiting passenger service on December 12, 1956. Themes of trips run have been Shippers Special Train, American Honors Society, NRHS and Great Lakes Western passenger special. E&LS handed off the North Woods Explorer train to the Soo Line at Pembine, who then took it to Sault Ste. Marie and then the Algoma Central trip to the Agawa Canyon on May 24, 1992.

These specials necessitated two special runs between the engine shops at Wells and the E&LS mainline at Pembine over Canadian National Railroad trackage from North Escanaba to Powers to Hermansville and finally to Pembine.

=== Shippers Special ===
The Shippers Special Train usually runs late spring-early summer from Pembine south to Howard and then back north to Channing. There the train stops in Channing for a short crew change and then train goes as far as Mass City. The Shippers Special Train did not run in 2020.

=== American Honors Society Excellence In Education ===
The American Honors Society train ran on the LS&I with little known of its running from 2010 to 2014. The Honors Train departs Eagle Mills and runs to the ore dock and returns. Several cars were used from E&LS and Lake Superior Railroad Museum with diesels supplied by the LS&I railroad. A coach seen running in the train, marked Wisconsin & Southern Railroad Co. (ELS marks), #1001 and City of Horicon was also seen in several year's trains.

=== E&LS owned or leased passenger equipment ===
Below is the E&LS rolling stock, many of which are used for the recent trains run behind E&LS engines S-12 #300 and GP-38 #400.

Escanaba & Lake Superior Railroad owned or leased Passenger Equipment
Number	Marked	Type	Prev owners	Other
100	ELS	Coach	Chicago, Burlington and Quincy Railroad. Built in 19??	Heavyweight 6 axle coach. Ex 'Trans Northern'.
254	ELS	HEP Generator/Baggage	Northern Pacific	Former NP traded to the E&LS by the Lake Superior Railway Museum for a VIA Rail Power Car.
758	ELS	Parlor-Observation	Soo Line	Platform observation. Originally café-parlor observation. 6 axle. Built by Barney & Smith in 1914.
1001	ELS	Coach	Wisconsin and Southern Railroad	Ex Amtrak, nee UP.
1082	ELS	Pullman-Observation	Reserve Mining railroad, ex GN 1082, nee "Dolly Madison".	Not marked 1082 externally.
1100	ELS	Parlor - Sleeper	VIA Rail	HEP equipped parlor sleeper car "Mount Edith Cavell".
1101	ELS	Sleeper	VIA Rail #1101. Built in 1954	HEP equipped sleeper car "Mount Robson".
1105	ELS	Sleeper	VIA Rail #1105. Built in 1954	Mount Tekarra
1348	ELS	Diner-Lounge	VIA Rail	HEP equipped Diner Lounge car.
1237	ELS	Coach	Soo Line	Stenciled "Soo Line" 6 axle.
6700	CNW	Parlor	C&NW Twin Cities 400 parlor car "Deerpath"	Owned by Lake Superior Railway Museum and was stored on the E&LS.
7000	ELS	Flatcar	unknown	Open-air flatcar patio bar car (band 2018).

== Locomotives ==
=== Leased power ===
After acquiring the Milwaukee Road line from Green Bay to Ontonagon, the E&LS needed more power to run their trains. The railroads and leasers were: Conrail, Green Bay & Western, Lake Superior & Ishpeming, Milwaukee Road, Erie Mining and Soo Line.

Several of the Conrail units leased ended up being leased for several years and then purchased by E&LS.

=== Active motive power ===
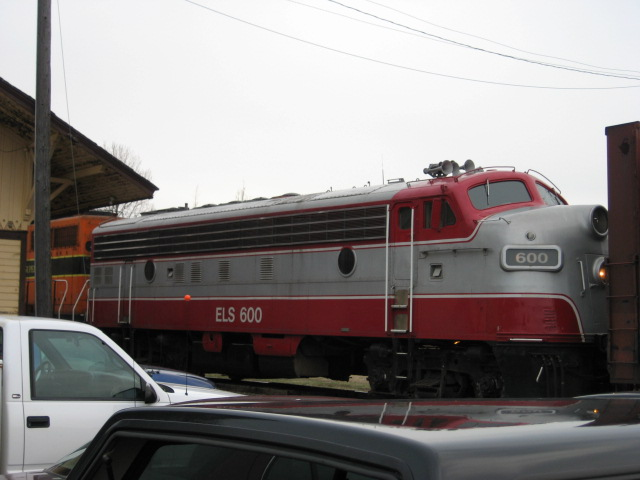
ELS EMD FP7 #600 at Channing, Mi. on April 29, 2009

In 1985, the first EMD diesel, a GP-38 (E&LS 400) was purchased, followed shortly by additional GP-38s (ex-Conrail ELS 401 & 402) and 4 SD9s (1220-1224). In 2003, the railroad bought two SD-40-2s (ex-Electro-Motive Diesel Leasing E&LS 500 & 501), and, unusually, an FP7 (ELS 600) two years later. The FP7 was originally Milwaukee Road 96A, which would later be bought by the Wisconsin Southern, and sold to the E&LS. The SD9s except for 1223 and 1221 have been retired as of 2025. 1223 still operates in Wells and Escanaba, but it has been restricted from mainline service. This locomotive has since been removed from service following an engine room fire in September 2026.

In early January 2020, the railroad bought the ILSX SD40-2 #1344 and later in the year re-numbered it 502. The trucks from the since decommissioned SD-40-2, E&LS 500, were replaced with the original worn-out trucks on E&LS 502. They were the original silver trucks from when the engine was a Union Pacific SD40-2. In May 2020, E&LS bought a EMD SD40-2 from ILSX (#1338), a former GTW/BNSF Railway and numbered it 503.

As of November 17, 2026, the following locomotives are currently owned or leased by the Escanaba & Lake Superior Railroad.
Number	Model	Status	Other
numberless	GE 45 Ton	Shop switcher	Built April 1953 as #31795. Ex White Pine Copper mine WPCR #1.
112	Russel Snow Plow	Active	Built in 1967 from a 40-foot boxcar by the E&LS shop men at Wells to replace a wooden Russell plow, entered service in 1968, is painted in company colors, stored at Channing, Mi.
300	RS-12	Active	Built January 1953 as # BLW 75767. Ex SAL 1474, ex SCL 215. Sold as Michigan Northern 215 in 1976. It was sold as E&LS 215 in 1980 and rebuilt in 1982 as ELS 300. Painted in ELS scheme.
400	GP38	Active	Built May 1970 as # EMD 36459. Ex Conrail 7843, nee PC 7843. Sold as E&LS 401 in 1985 and renumbered 2nd 400 in 1986. Painted in ELS scheme.
502	SD40-2	Active	Built January 1980 as # 796297-35. Ex Union Pacific 3693, ex SLRG 202, ex ILSX 202, ex ILSX 1344. Trucks swapped With ELS 500. Radiator issues.
600	FP7	Active	Built January 1951 as # EMD 10361. Ex Wisconsin & Southern 71A, ex Wisconsin & Calumet 96A, ex Milwaukee Road 96A. Acquired June 2005. Returned to service in late September 2026 after having gone OOS in 2020 due to a traction motor needing replacement.
1200	SW8	Active	Built June 1952 as #16925. Ex Reserve Mining 1200. It was sold as E&LS 1200 in 1992.
1201	SW8	Active	Built June 1952 as #6412. Ex Reserve Mining 1201. Based in Menominee, secondary locomotive.
1202	TR4A	Active	Built September 1950 as #4032. Ex Belt Railway of Chicago BRC 503. TR4A is a cow-calf version of EMD SW7. Stored in Menominee. Electrical issues.
1221	SD9	Active	Built June 1955 as #19990. Ex Reserve Mining 1221. It was sold as EL&S 1221 in 1992.
1224	SD9	Active	Built December 1956 as #5485. Ex Reserve Mining 1224. It was sold as E&LS 1224 in 1992.
2738	SD40M-2	Active	Built January 1968. Order #7993 Serial Number 33837, PRR 6215, (2nd No) PC 6215 (3rd No) CR 6215 (4th No) CNW 6538. Rebuilt by MPI for the SP as a SD40M-2 as SP 8662, to (6th No) UP 2738 (7th No) NREX 2738 (8th No) SPTX 2738. Leased to E&LS in October 2026.

=== Inactive motive power ===
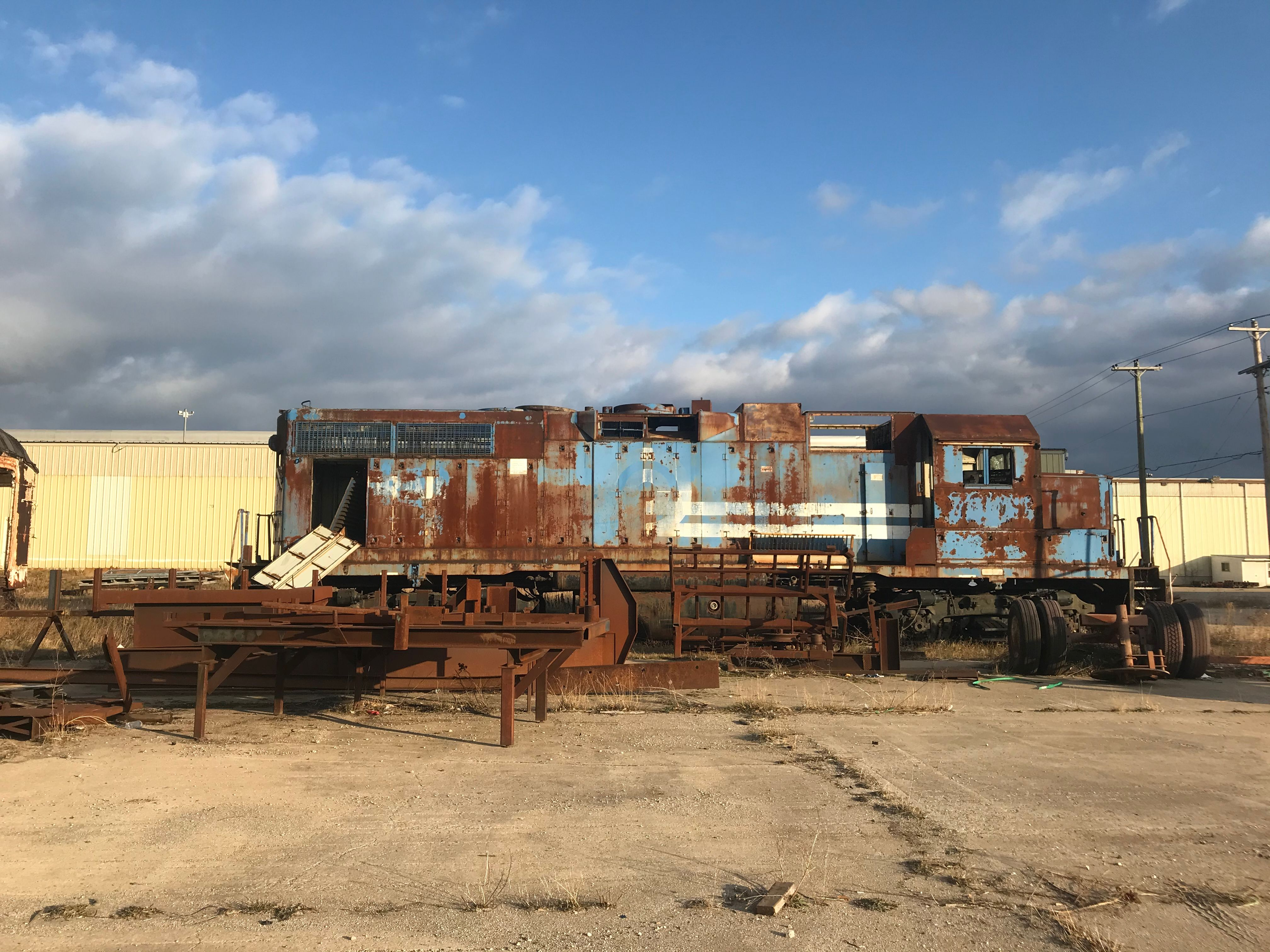
E&LS 401 sits at the E&LS car shops in Escanaba; since 1991 the unit has been a parts source.

When it began operations, the E&LS used steam locomotives purchased second hand from other railroads in the Midwest. It bought a new Shay locomotive for logging service in 1904, followed by various locomotives from Baldwin. The E&LS first diesel locomotive, a Baldwin VO-1000, was purchased in 1946. The E&LS continued buying new and used Baldwins for the next several decades. Some notable mentions are the E&LS 300, the engine that can often be seen running the Shippers Special train.

Other locomotives include the Baldwin RS-12s 207-217 series. 10 RS-12s have either been sold off or put in a deadline at the E&LS Wells Facility. Other engines are the E&LS Shark Nose Baldwin's, originally from the New york Central RR. See Delaware and Hudson 1205 and 1216, numbered 3805 & 3816. Other notable mentions are engines 100 & 101, a pair of DS44-660s. The 101 can still be seen in Wells with its GN inspired paint scheme. The railroad also owns two Ex-Wisconsin & Calumet (WICT) F7As and a F7B. There were several other engines, the 201, 202, & 204. These were the DS44-1000s.

All #'s below are out of service (OOS) as of November 17, 2026.
Number	Model	Status	Other
1	Plymouth 25 Ton	Inactive	Built April 1936. Ex B&D RR Co. Lettered for the fictitious Buckwheat & Durham Railroad (B&D). Originally used as the Crivitz yard switcher.
7	Shay	Sold	Built by Lima Locomotive Works in January 1904. Sold August 1920.
8	Baldwin 2-8-0	Sold	Built June 1904. Sold August 1929.
9	Baldwin 2-8-0	Sold	Built June 1904.
10	Baldwin 2-8-0	Sold	Built June 1907.
11	Baldwin 4-6-0	Sold	Built June 1909.
11	Whitcomb 80 tonner	?	
12	Baldwin 4-6-0	Sold	Built June 1911.
14	Baldwin 4-6-0	Sold	Built June 1917 s/n #4503. Sold to Arcade & Attica Railroad in 1963.
15	Baldwin 4-6-0	Sold	Built June 1909 as #29721. Bought used from Duluth & Northern Minnesota in 1922.
16	Baldwin 4-6-0	Sold	Built June 1909 as #29721. Bought used from Duluth & Northern Minnesota in 1922. Retired and sold to Nahma and Northern Railroad in 1937.
17	0-6-0	Sold	Bought used in 1929.
18	Alco 4-6-0	Sold	Built 1913 for GB&W. Purchased 1935
100	VO-1000	Scrapped 1974	Built June 1946 as # BLW 72227. Later Nahma & Northern No. 16.
101	DS-4-4-660	OOS	Built November 1947 as # BLW 73367. Painted in E&LS scheme.
102	Baldwin S-8	Scrapped 6/2025	Built May 1952 as # BLW 75700.
102B	F7B	OOS	Built October 1951 as # EMD 15243. Ex Wisconsin & Calumet, ex Wisconsin & Southern 71A, ex Milwaukee Road 102B.
106	F7A	OOS	Built November 1951 as # EMD 15218. Ex Wisconsin & Calumet 106, ex Janesville & Eastern 106, ex Milwaukee Road 117C.
201	DS44-1000	OOS	Built July 1948 as # BLW 73956. Ex Calumet & Hecla 201. Sold to E&LS in 1971.
202	DS44-1000	Scrapped 7/2025	Built August 1948 as # BLW 73957. Ex Calumet & Hecla 202.
204	DS44-1000	OOS	Built May 1950 as # BLW 74777. Ex Calumet & Hecla 204 nee US Corps of Engineers L4. To E&LS in 1971.
207	RS-12	OOS	Built May 1952 as BLW #75475. Ex Seaboard Air Line 207, ex Seaboard Coast Line 207, ex Oregon California & Eastern 7908, ex Oregon California & Eastern 207. To E&LS December 1984. Leased to Nicolet Badger Northern in the early 90s.
209	RS-12	Scrapped 6/29/2026	Built May 1952 as #75477. Ex Seaboard Air Line RR 1468, ex Seaboard Coast Line 209, ex Oregon California & Eastern 7909. Acquired in May 1984.
210	RS-12	Scrapped 6/29/2026	Built May 1952 as #75478. Ex Seaboard Air Line 1469, Ex Seaboard Coast Line 210, ex Oregon California & Eastern 7910. Sold to E&LS as #210 in May 1984.
211	RS-12	Scrapped 6/29/2026	Built May 1952 as #75479. Ex Seaboard Air Line 1470, ex Seaboard Coast Line 211, ex Oregon California & Eastern 7911. Sold to E&LS as #211 in December 1985.
212	RS-12	Scrapped 6/29/2026	Built May 1952 as # BLW 75480. Ex Michigan Northern 212, ex Seaboard Coast Line 212, nee Seaboard Air Line 1471. To E&LS 1980.
213	RS-12	Scrapped 6/29/2026	Built January 1953 as # BLW 75765. Ex Michigan Northern 213, ex Seaboard Coast Line 213, nee Seaboard Air Line 1472. To E&LS 1980.
214	RS-12	Scrapped 6/29/2026	Built January 1953 as #75766. Ex Seaboard Air Line 1473, ex Seaboard Coast Line 214, sold to Birmingham Rail & Locomotive Co. It was sold as Neosha Construction Co. 6494 and sold as E&LS #210 in 1983. It was renumbered 214 in 1984. While in transit to E&LS it was numbered E&LS 711.
401	GP38	OOS	Used as a parts source at Escanaba shop. Built October 1969 as # EMD 35438, later Penn Central 7809 then Conrail 7809. Sold as E&LS 400 in 1985. It was renumbered to 401 in 1986 and retired by 1992.
402	GP38	OOS	Built September 1969 as # EMD 35401. Ex Conrail 7772, nee Penn Central 7772. Sold to E&LS in 1985. "serious mechanical problems."
500	SD40-2	OOS	Built June 1974 as # EMD 73687-1. Ex GATX 7349/9339/6349, ex S00 RR 6349, nee Milwaukee Road 182 2nd. OOS engine failure.
501	SD40-2	OOS	Built July 1973 as #EMD 72641-2. Ex EMDX 6306, ex SOO RR 6306, nee Milwaukee Road 22. Radiator issues.
503	SD40-2	OOS	Built January 1970 as # 7221. Ex ILSX 1338, GTW 5915, ex BNSF 7303. Painted in patched out BNSF H1 paint scheme.
901	F7A	OOS	Built July 1949 as # EMD 8358. Ex Wisconsin & Calumet 109, ex Chicago Chemung Railroad CMN 562, ex ACLZ 64, ex Denver & Rio Grande Western Railroad 5644, nee Denver & Rio Grande Western Railroad 564D.
950	F7B	OOS	Built July 1950 as EMD # 3035. Ex Wisconsin & Calumet, Milwaukee Road #X1 a Rotary Snow Plow power car, nee Milwaukee Road 71B. Sold to E&LS by Lake Superior Railroad Museum
1205	Baldwin RF16A	OOS	Built December 1951. Ex Michigan Northern 1205, ex Delaware & Hudson RR 1205, ex Monongahela Railway 1205, nee NYC 3805. Baldwin "Shark Nose". Stored in warehouse. To E&LS in 1979.
1216	Baldwin RF16A	OOS	Built 1952. Ex Michigan Northern 1216, ex Delaware & Hudson RR 1216, ex Monongahela Railway 1216, ex NYC 1216, nee NYC 3816. Baldwin "Shark Nose". Stored in warehouse. To E&LS in 1979.
1220	SD9	OOS	Built June 1955 as #19989. Ex Reserve Mining 1220. It was sold as E&LS 1220 in 1992. Stored for parts.
1222	SD9	OOS	Built June 1955 as #19991. Ex Reserve Mining 1222. It was sold as E&LS 1222 in 1992.
1223	SD9	OOS	Built September 1956 as #21066. Ex Reserve Mining 1223. It was sold as E&LS 1223 in 1992. Engine room fire 9/2026.
1371	EMD SW1	stored	Built November 1950 # 11222. Ex ILSX 1371, ex WPCR 1371, ex Amtrak 740, ex Amtrak 253:1, ex PC 8528, nee PRR 9428.

==== Gallery ====
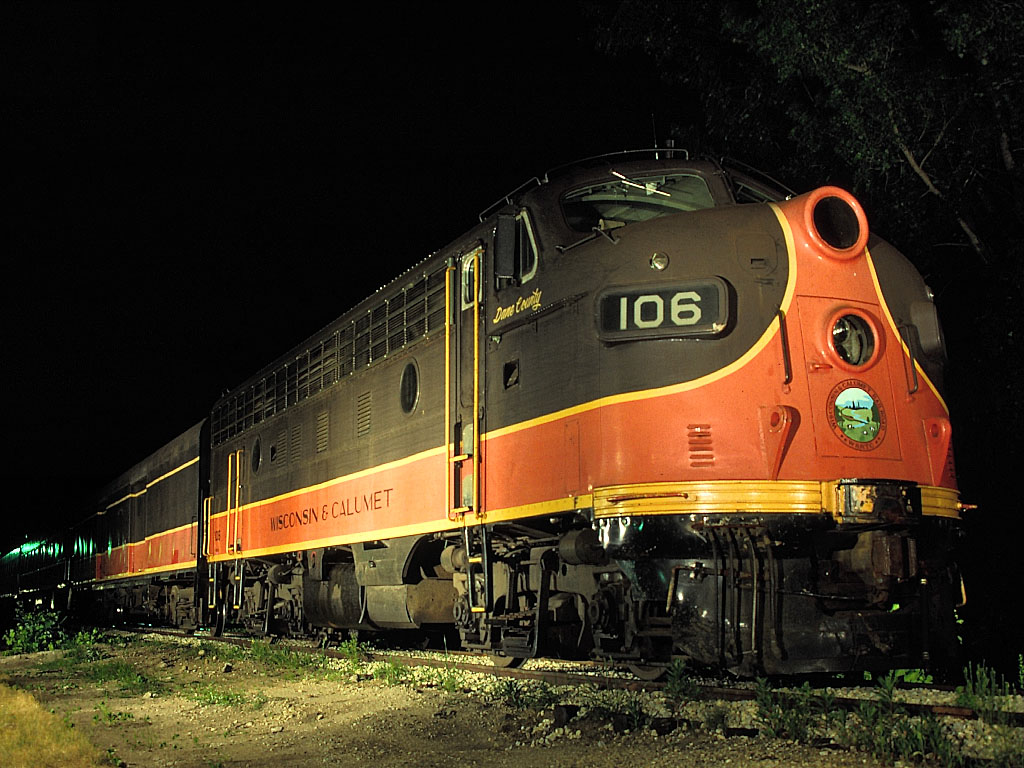
E&LS 106 in Fox Lake, IL 1 July 1993

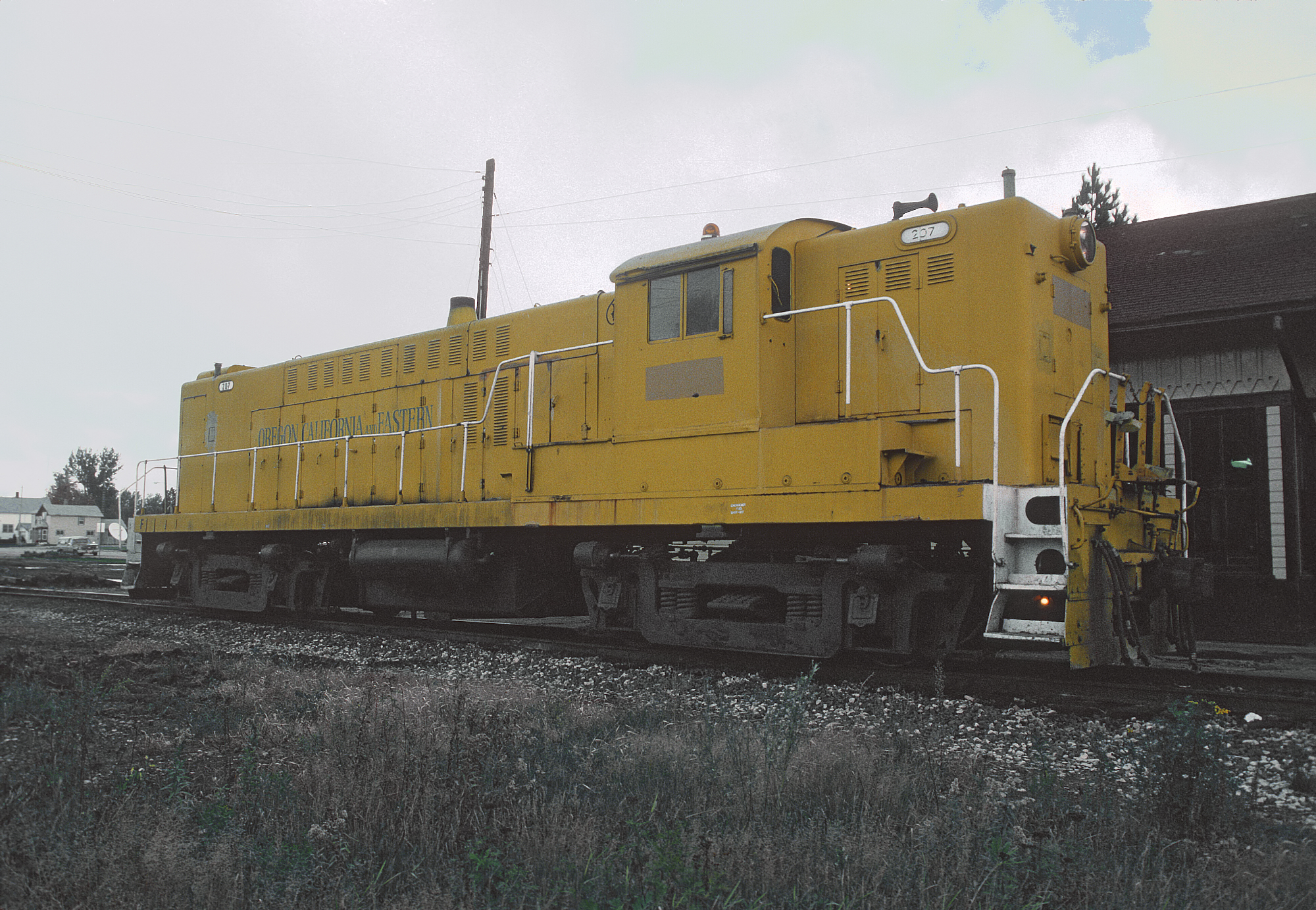
ELS #207 at Channing, MI on October 5, 1988

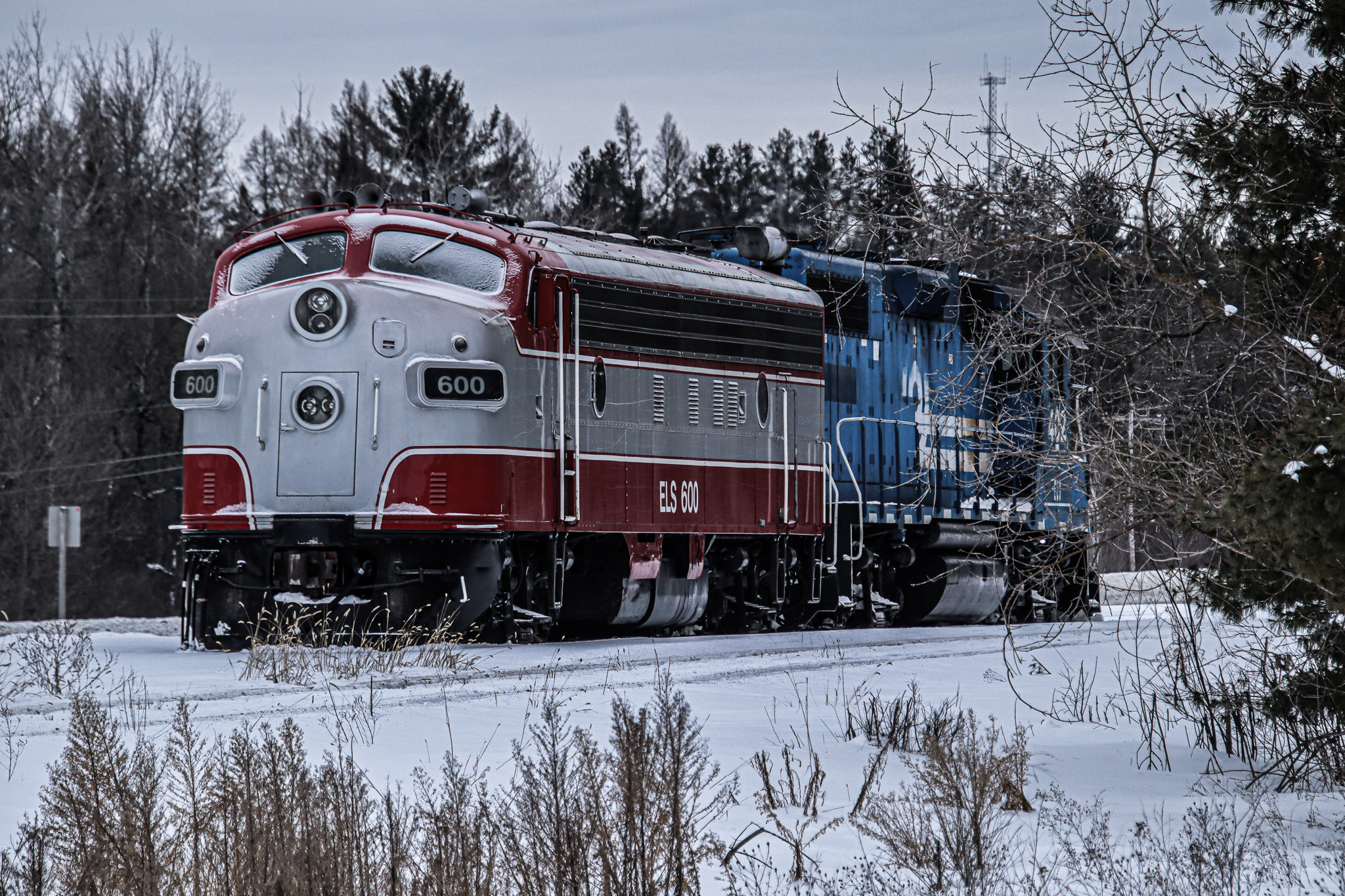
ELS 600 & 402 in Pembine

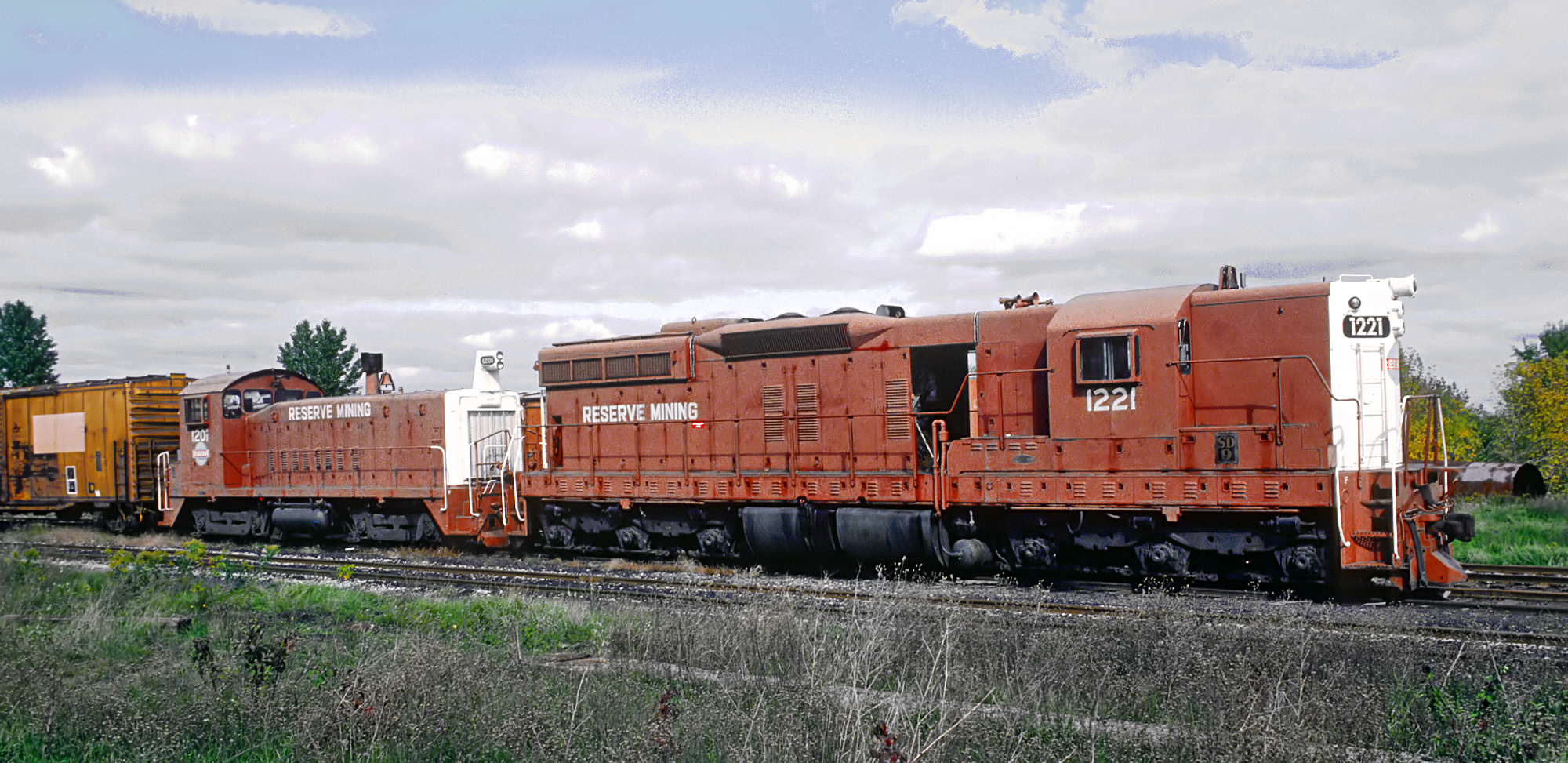
E&LS SD9 and SW8, both former Reserve Mining locomotives.

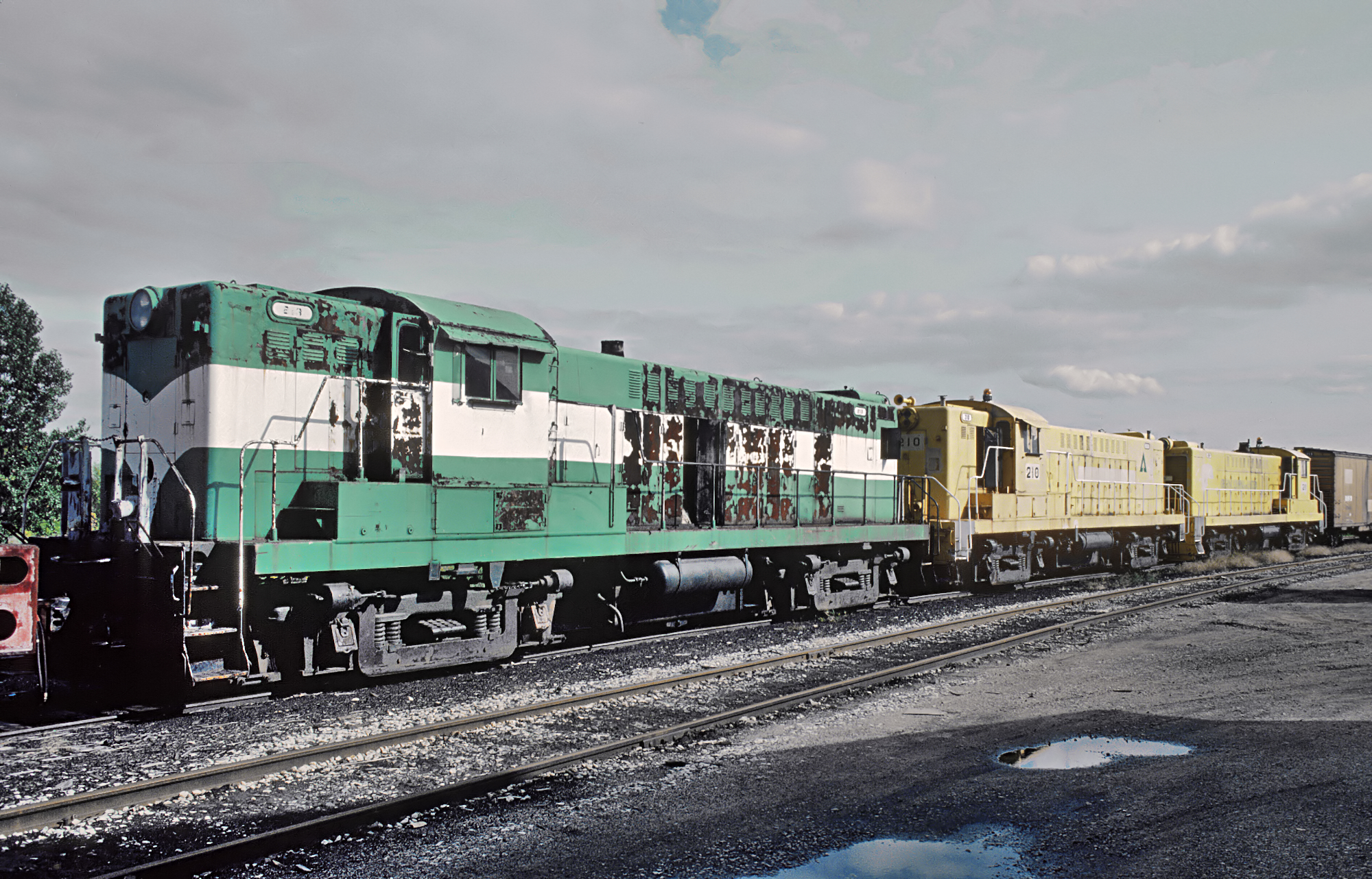
Wells, Michigan

More Media related to Escanaba and Lake Superior Railroad at Wikimedia Commons

== Facilities, yards, and lines ==
=== Engine shops ===
- Wells
- Escanaba old Harnischfeger (P&H Crane) facility

=== Railroad yards ===
- Channing, Michigan
- Crivitz, Wisconsin repair-in-place (RIP) railcar facility
- Groos, Michigan
- Pembine, Wisconsin
- Wells, Michigan

=== Engine housing facilities ===
- Channing
- Crivitz
- Menominee
- Wells

=== Bulk transfer and wood yards ===
- Amasa
- Beecher, Wisconsin - McConnell Landing station name
- Crivitz (2)
- Floodwood - bulk transfer
- Iron Mountain - bulk transfer
- Mass City
- Pembine (2)
- Randville
- Sidnaw, Mi - bulk transfer
- Sobieski

== Interchange locations ==
The E&LS interchanges with the Canadian National Railroad in several different locations:

- North Escanaba, Michigan
- Howard, Wisconsin
- Pembine, Wisconsin
- Marinette, Wisconsin

== Trackage rights ==
In late 2014, the E&LS and Canadian National Railway entered into a switching agreement to switch customers of CN in Marinette and Menominee. All traffic is given to the E&LS at Marinette; E&LS delivers loads or empties from both railroad's customers in those communities. This created a big costs and time savings for both railroads as it greatly simplified operations in these twin cities.

The E&LS RR has trackage rights on several parts of the Canadian National Railroad.

- Howard, to North Green Bay Yard in Green Bay, Wisconsin (These once extended to the Milwaukee's Oakland Avenue Yard, in downtown Green Bay via the WC, past the C&NW Green Bay station)
- Pembine to North Escanaba

== Stations ==
Existing station - all owned by E&LS

- Channing - former Milwaukee and Northern Railway Company then Milwaukee Road depot built in
- Crivitz - former Milwaukee and Northern Railway Company then Milwaukee Road depot built in 1883. This area was previously referred to as Ellis Junction.
- Iron Mountain - former Milwaukee and Northern Railway Company then Milwaukee Road depot built in 1914.
- Ontonagon - former Ontonagon and Brule River Railroad then Milwaukee Road depot.

Past stations

- Randville - moved across M-95; private residence.
- Sagola
- Stiles Junction

Section houses:

- Frost
- Randville
- Sidnaw
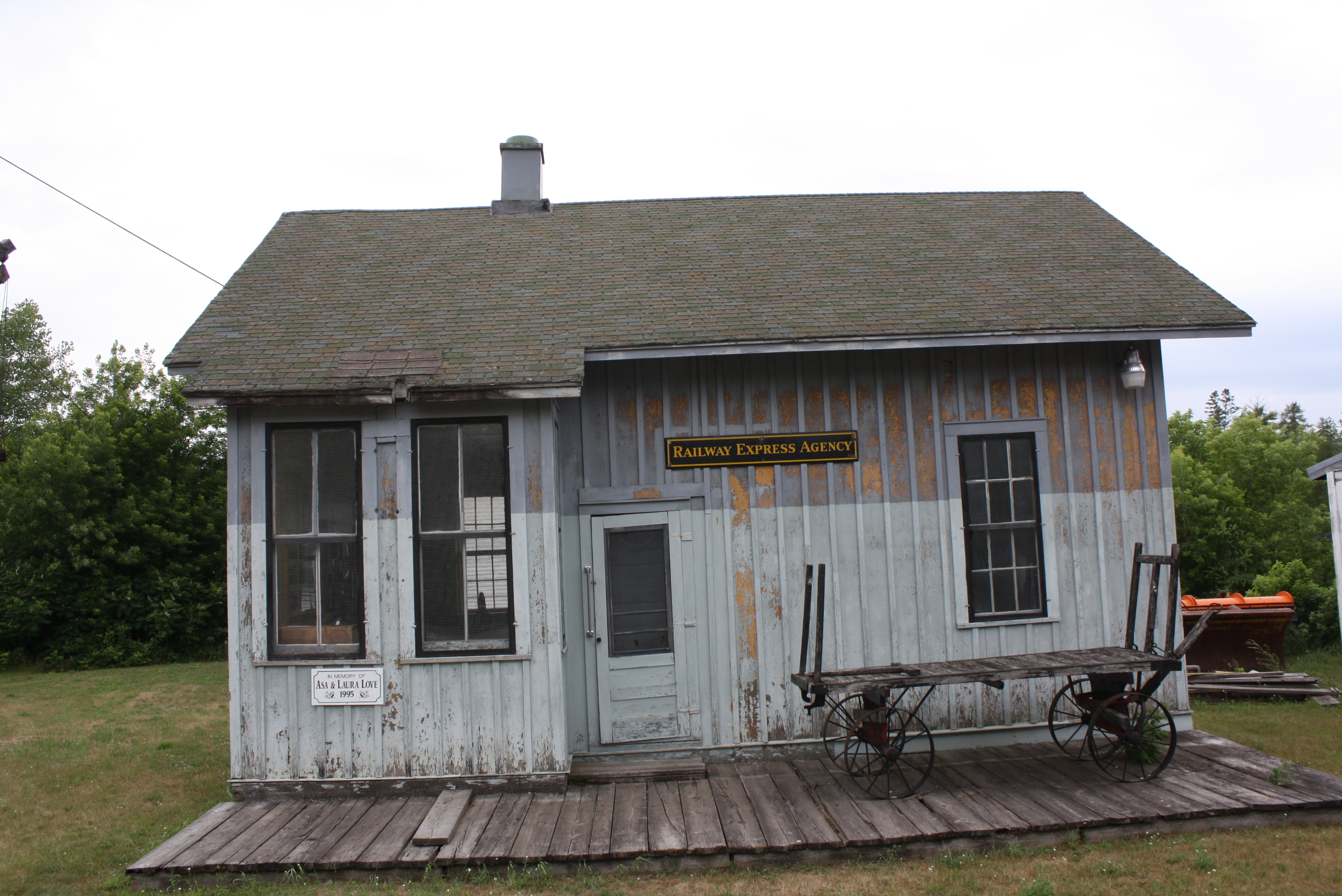
Amberg, WI

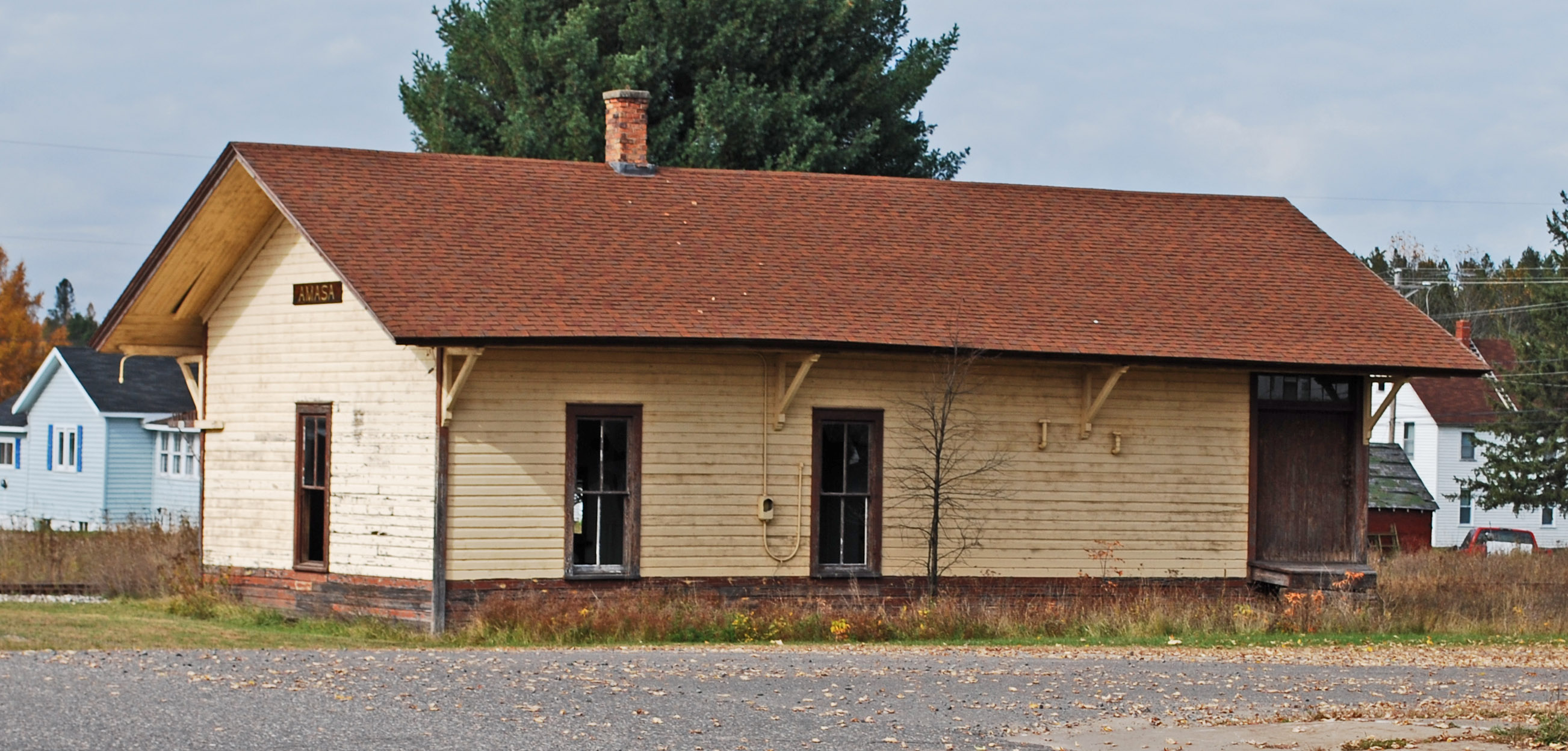
Amasa, MI

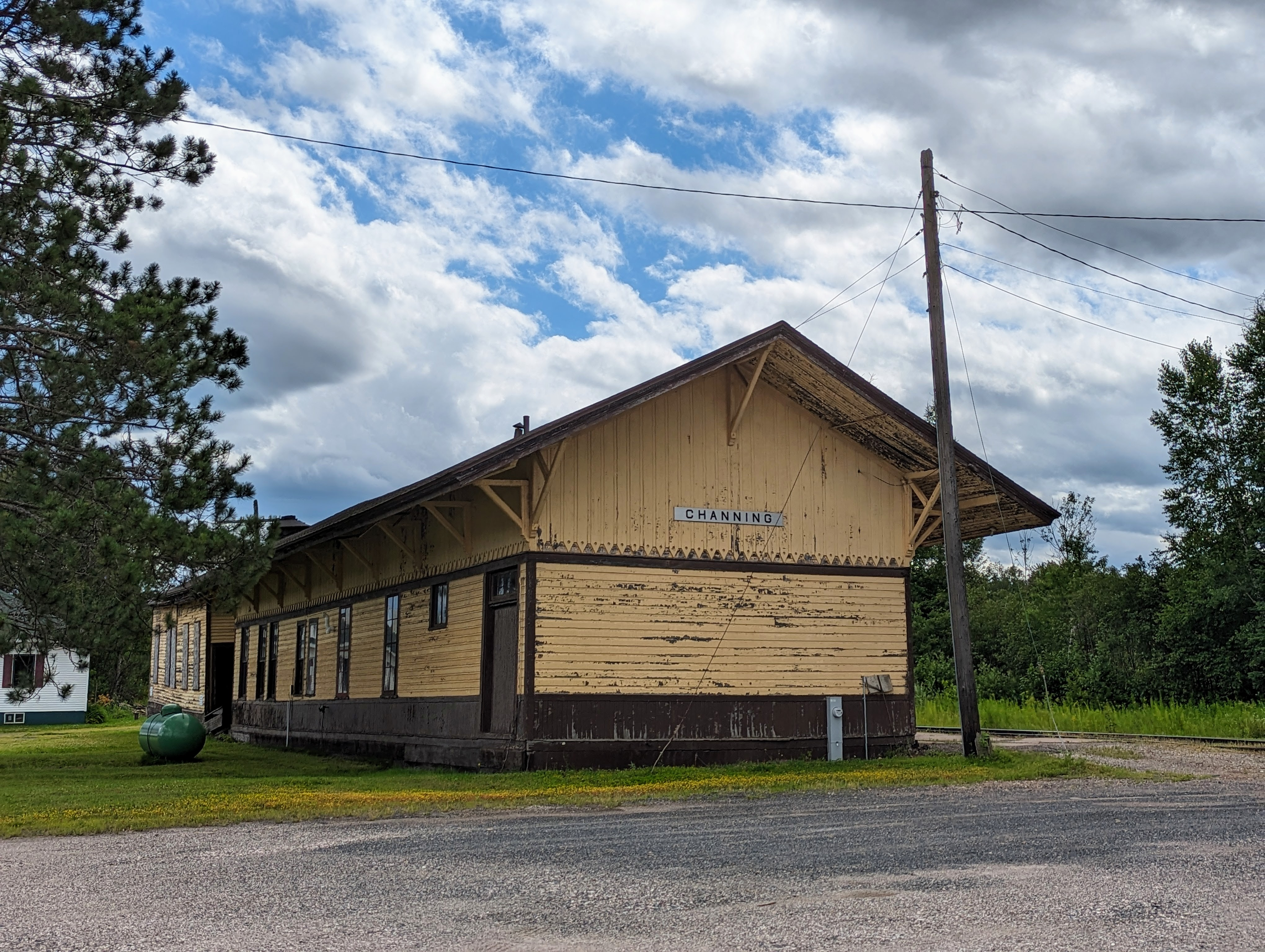
Channing, MI

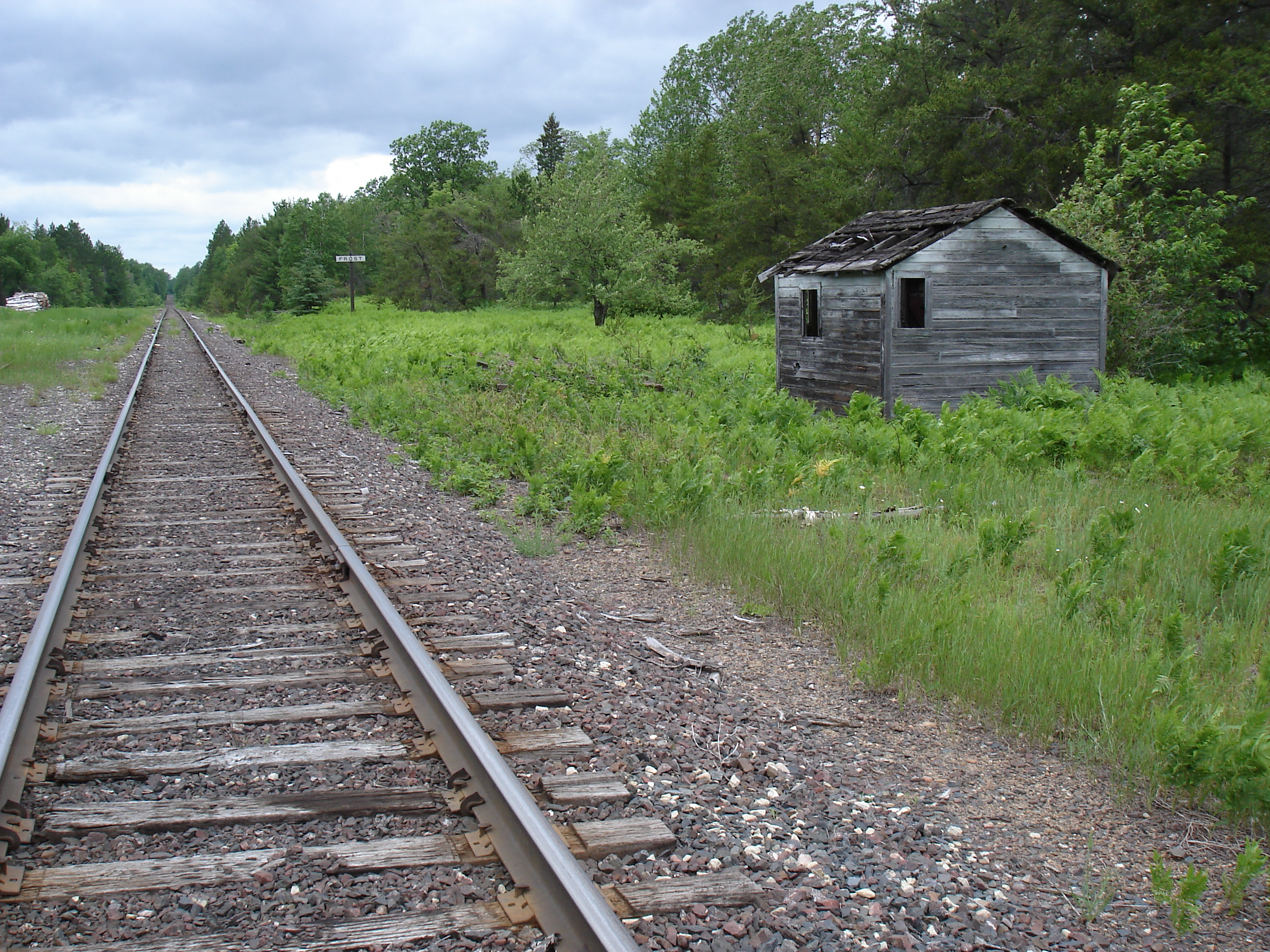
Frost, MI

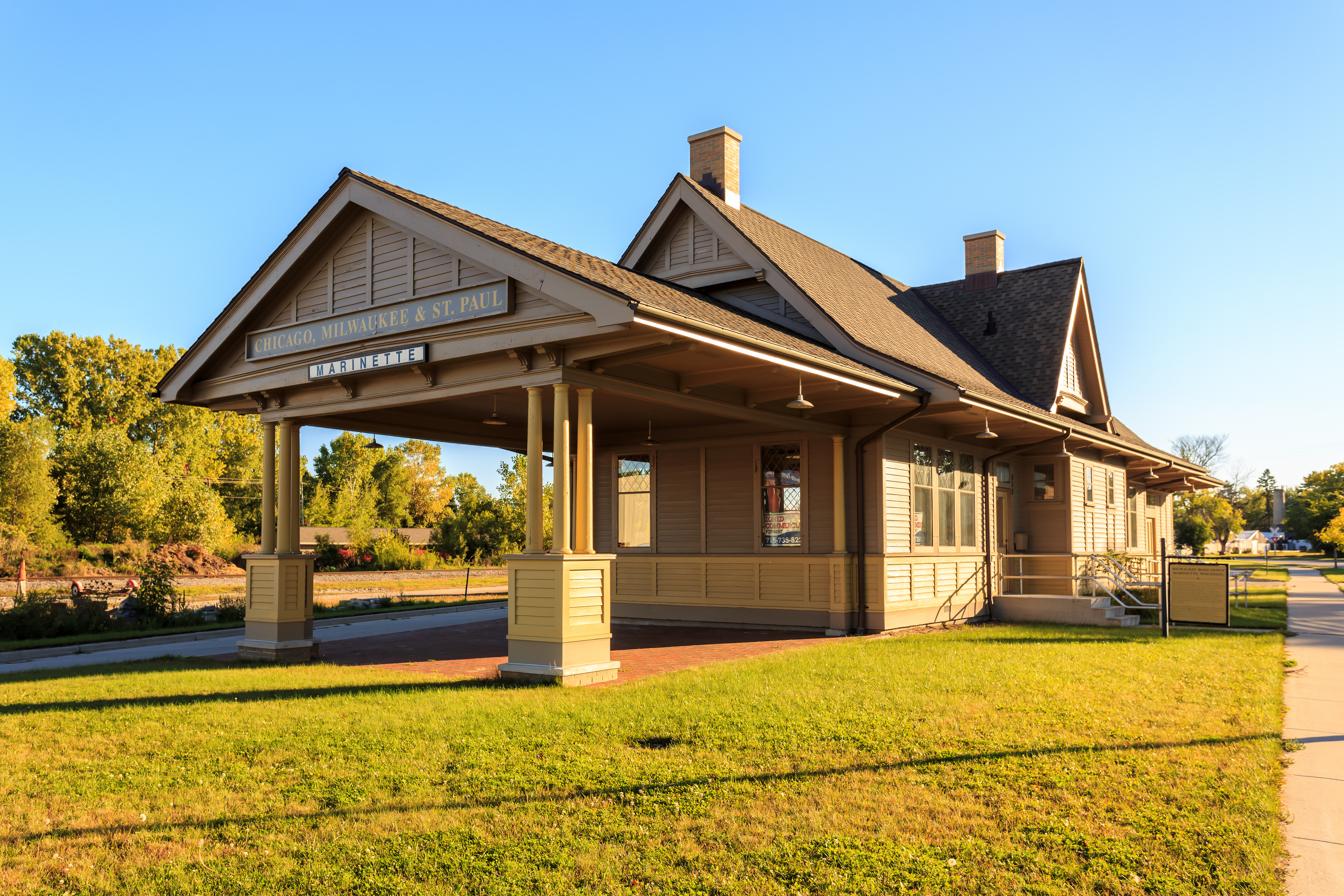
Marinette, WI
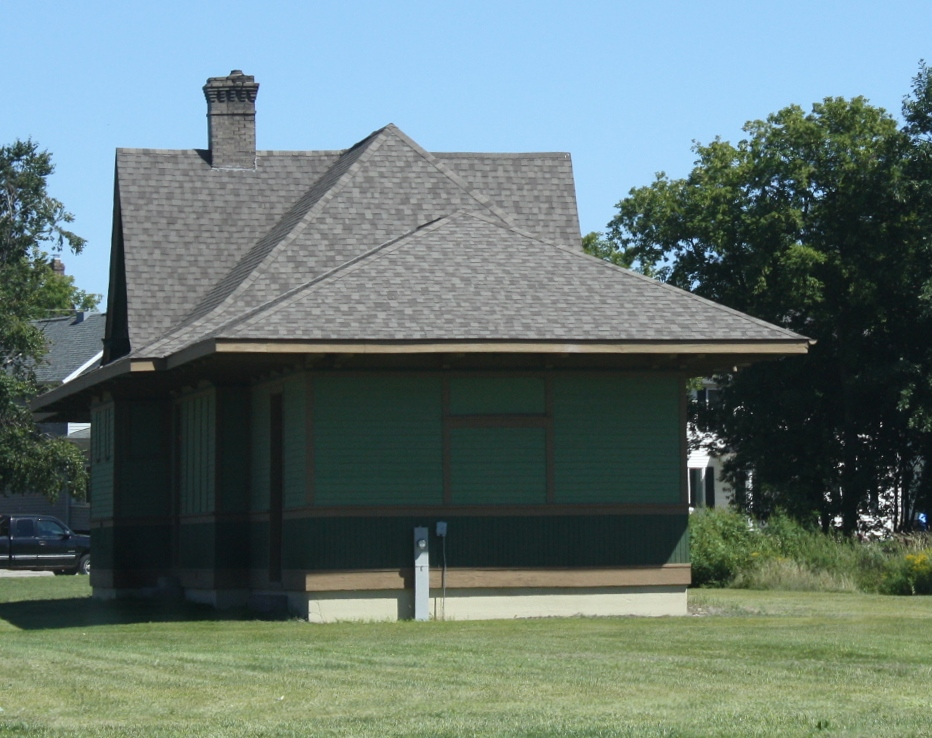
Menominee, MI

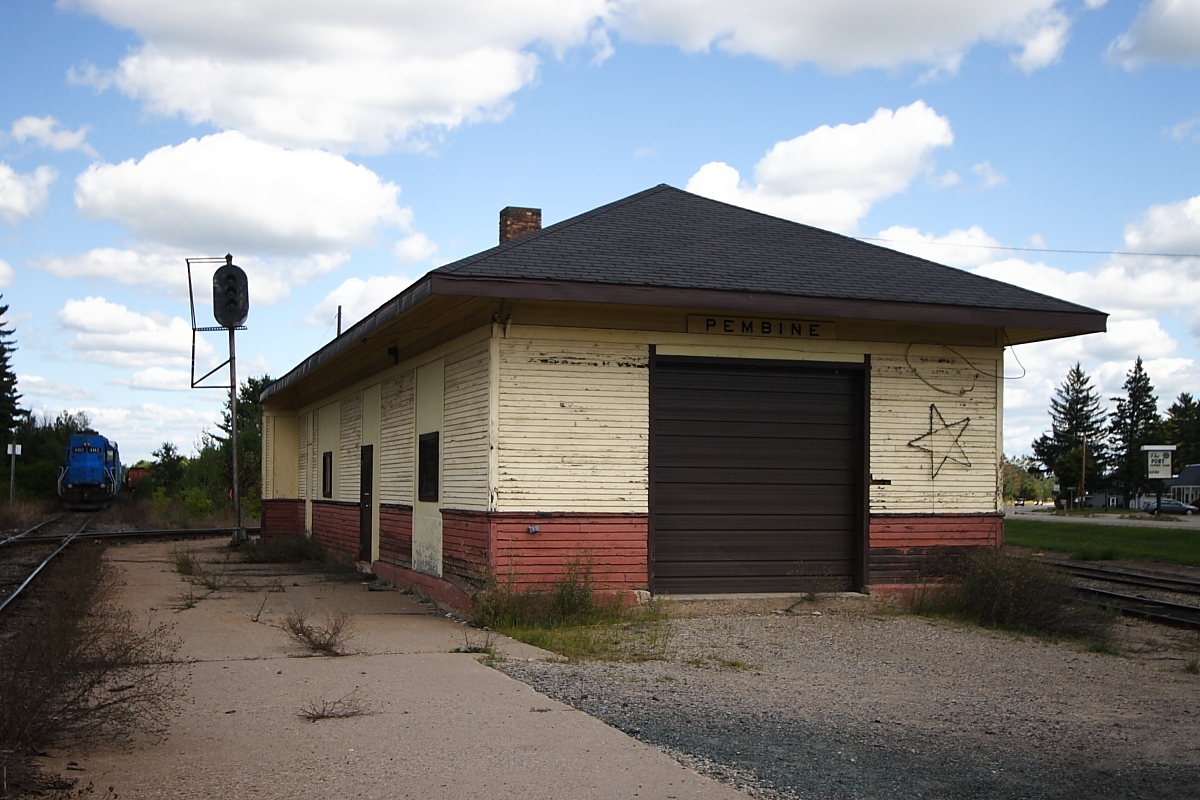
Pembine, WI, burned 2019

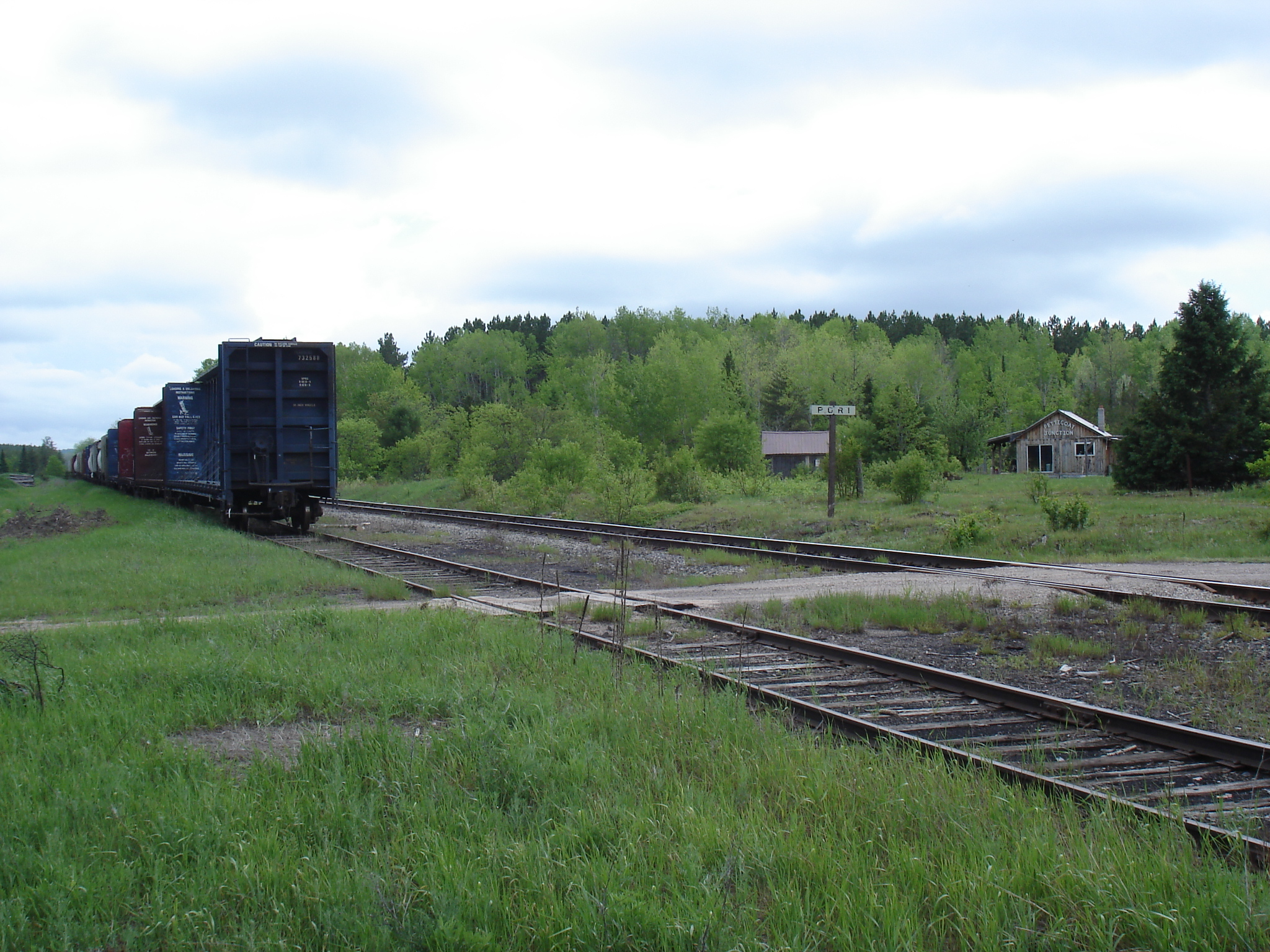
Pori, MI

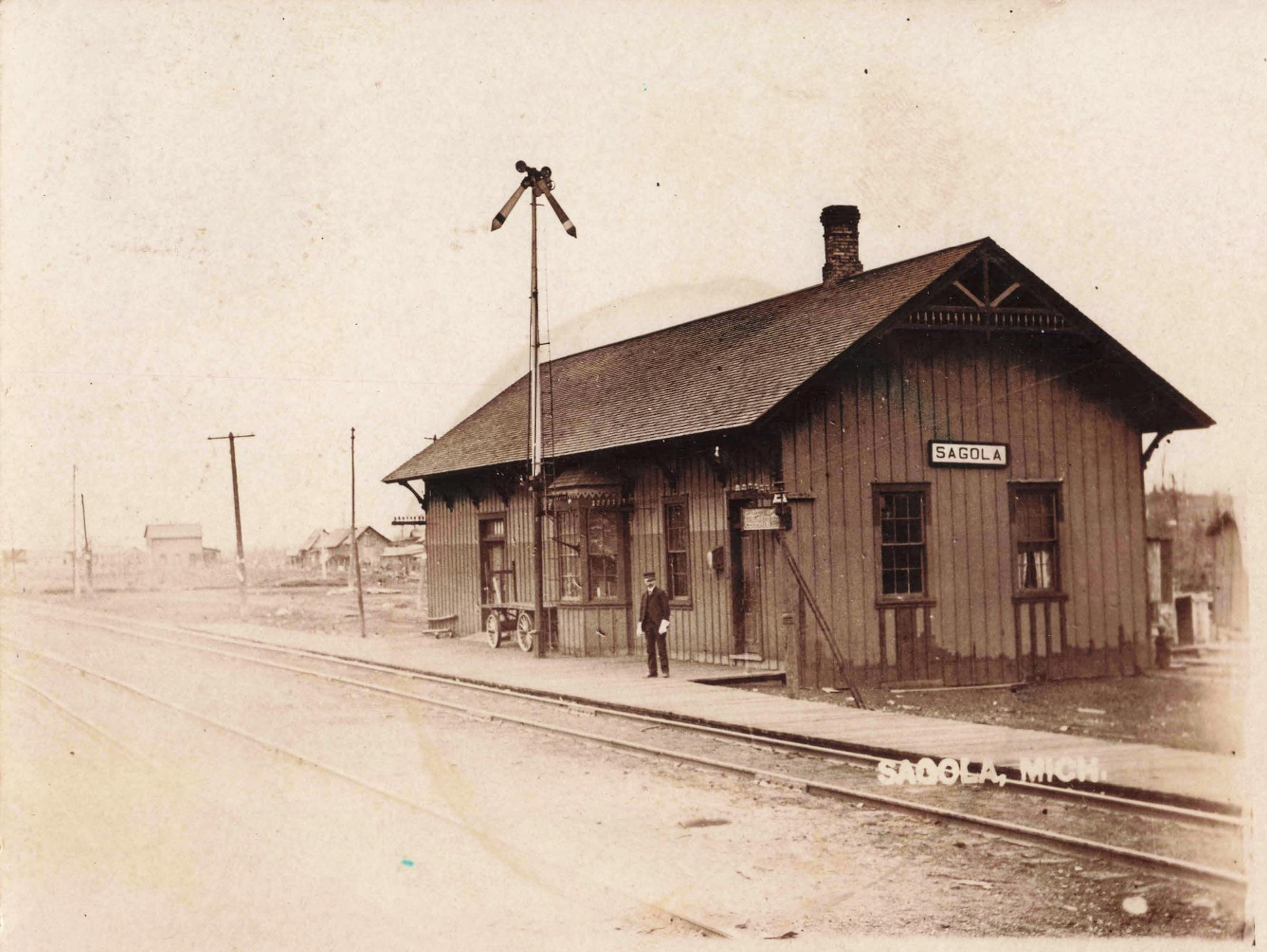
Sagola Station, Sagola, Michigan, 1912

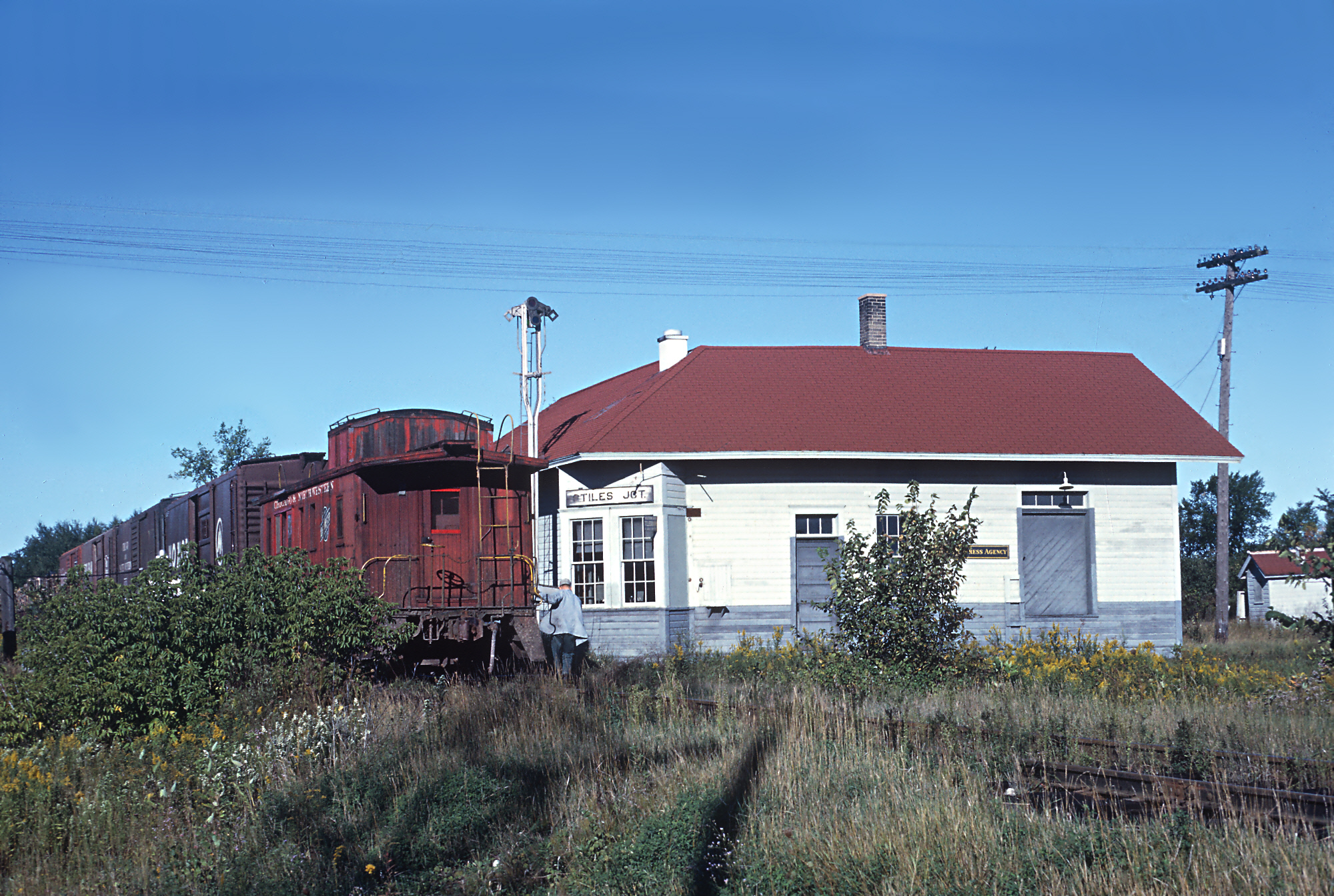
C&NW freight passing the MILW station at Stiles Junction, WI in September 1964

== See also ==
- Milwaukee Road Depot, Iron Mountain, Michigan
- Stiles Junction, Wisconsin
