= Sharknose =

Kind of diesel locomotive

Sharknose is also the nickname of the Ferrari 156 F1

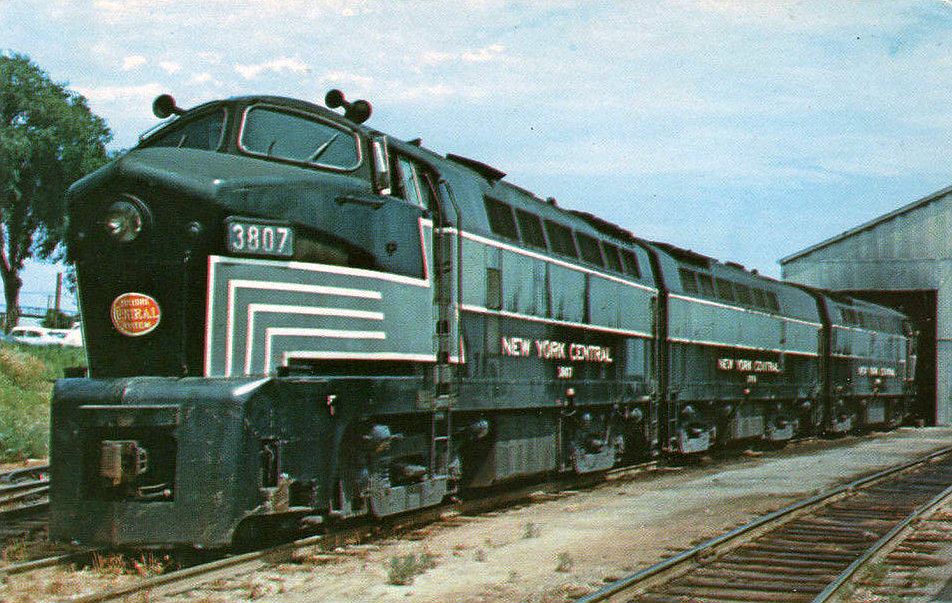
A three-unit set of Baldwin RF-16 locomotives owned by New York Central Railroad in 1958.

Sharknose is a term applied by railfans to the styling of several cab unit diesel locomotives built by the Baldwin Locomotive Works to the specifications of the Pennsylvania Railroad. The styling was by Baldwin Locomotive Works under the direction of Mr. Donald L. Hadley. Design Patent D154,120 bears his name.

== Pennsylvania Railroad ==
Locomotives commonly known as "sharknoses" include:

- Baldwin DR-6-4-20, otherwise known as the "Passenger Sharknose" or "Passenger Shark"
- Baldwin DR-4-4-15, otherwise known as the "Freight Sharknose" or "Freight Shark", along with the:
- Baldwin RF-16

== Other railroads ==
While the passenger models were unique to the Pennsylvania Railroad, other railroads purchased and operated the freight models, including the New York Central, Baltimore and Ohio and Elgin, Joliet and Eastern. The New York Central was the last original owner to operate the engines, selling the last of them to the Monongahela Railway for $6,000 each (equal to $57,934 today) in late 1967. By 1972, all but two of them, Nos. 1205 and 1216, had been scrapped. The final pair also were sold for scrap in 1974, but were rescued from the torch by the Delaware and Hudson Railway, which at the time was also operating four ALCO PA-1 passenger locomotives. In 1978, Nos. 1205 and 1216 were sold to the Castolite Corporation, which leased them for use on the Michigan Northern Railway. Both engines have purportedly been stored out of public view on the property of the Escanaba and Lake Superior Railroad since the 1980s.

== Automobiles ==
The name "sharknose" has also been given to streamlined automobiles of the 1930s and 1940s, because of their design, first introduced in 1936 on the 1937 Willys passenger cars. Willys continued to manufacture them in this design until the beginning of World War II. The term was applied to the 1938 Graham-Paige "Spirit of Motion." The design was also used on the 1941 Nash, as well as 1940s Hudson models. The last automobile with this design was the 1947 Hudson.

Many classic BMWs from the 1960s to the 1980s were also designed with a pronounced nose that is commonly referred to as a shark nose.

== Motorcycles ==
In more recent years the term "sharknose" has been used to describe the Harley Davidson Road Glide line of motorcycles. The unique fairing of the Road Glide has been said to resemble the nose of a shark. Many forums and websites dedicated to the Road Glide line of vehicles make reference to "shark" in their name or tag lines. There is an annual week long gathering of Road Glide enthusiasts affectionately nick-named "shark week"
