= Wells Township, Delta County, Michigan =

Wells Township, Michigan
- Civil township
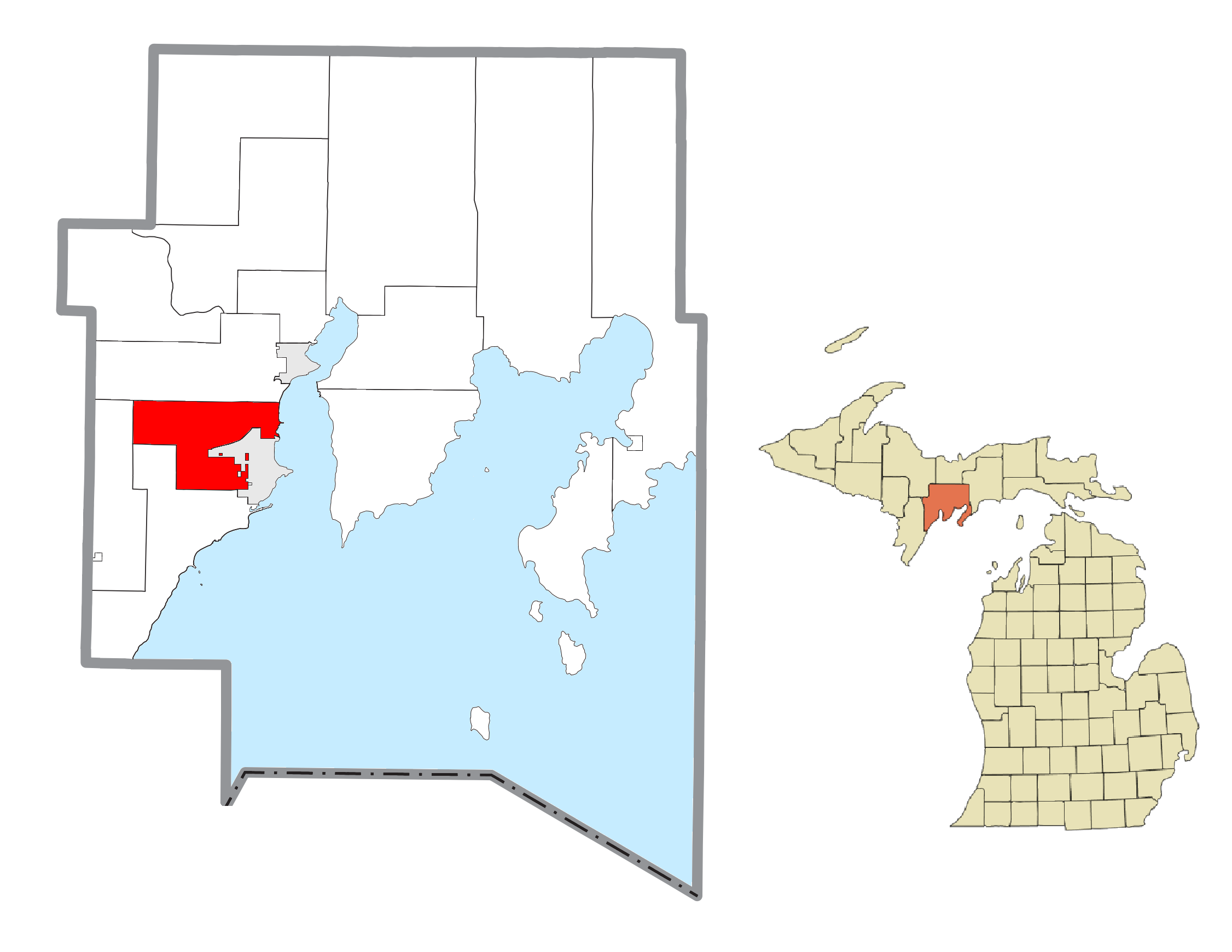
- Location within Delta County

- Location within the state of Michigan Wells Township (the United States)
- Coordinates: 45°46′41″N 87°07′02″W
- Country: United States
- State: Michigan
- County: Delta

Government
  - Supervisor: Matthew C. Jensen

Area
  - Total: 39.8 sq mi (103.2 km^{2})
  - Land: 39.5 sq mi (102.3 km^{2})
  - Water: 0.35 sq mi (0.9 km^{2})
- Elevation: 699 ft (213 m)

Population (2020)
  - Total: 4,876
  - Density: 123.4/sq mi (47.66/km^{2})
- Time zone: UTC-5 (Eastern (EST))
  - Summer (DST): UTC-4 (EDT)
- ZIP code(s): 49829, 49837, 49894
- Area code: 906
- FIPS code: 26-85240
- GNIS feature ID: 1627241
- Website: https://www.wellsdeltami.net/

Wells Township is a civil township of Delta County in the U.S. state of Michigan. The population was 4,876 at the 2020 census, slightly down from 4,885 at the 2010 census.

== Geography ==
According to the United States Census Bureau, the township has a total area of 39.8 square miles (103.2 km^{2}), of which 39.5 square miles (102.3 km^{2}) is land and 0.3 square mile (0.9 km^{2}) (0.88%) is water.

== Communities ==
- Groos is an unincorporated community in the township. It had a post office from 1900 to 1913.
- North Escanaba is an unincorporated community in the township.
- Pine Ridge is an unincorporated community in the township. It was named from the fact there was a forest of pines at a lofty elevation near the original town site.

== Demographics ==
As of the census of 2000, there were 5,044 people, 1,847 households, and 1,466 families residing in the township. The population density was 127.7 inhabitants per square mile (49.3/km^{2}). There were 1,922 housing units at an average density of 48.7 per square mile (18.8/km^{2}). The racial makeup of the township was 96.47% White, 0.06% African American, 1.55% Native American, 0.34% Asian, 0.08% Pacific Islander, 0.08% from other races, and 1.43% from two or more races. Hispanic or Latino of any race were 0.44% of the population.

There were 1,847 households, out of which 37.8% had children under the age of 18 living with them, 69.9% were married couples living together, 5.7% had a female householder with no husband present, and 20.6% were non-families. 17.1% of all households were made up of individuals, and 7.4% had someone living alone who was 65 years of age or older. The average household size was 2.72 and the average family size was 3.07.

In the township the population was spread out, with 26.9% under the age of 18, 6.9% from 18 to 24, 28.3% from 25 to 44, 26.7% from 45 to 64, and 11.2% who were 65 years of age or older. The median age was 39 years. For every 100 females, there were 103.6 males. For every 100 females age 18 and over, there were 101.1 males.

The median income for a household in the township was $48,065, and the median income for a family was $52,278. Males had a median income of $40,711 versus $22,337 for females. The per capita income for the township was $19,012. About 4.9% of families and 6.4% of the population were below the poverty line, including 5.2% of those under age 18 and 9.5% of those age 65 or over.
