= Baldwin DR-12-8-1500/2 =

Diesel-electric locomotive

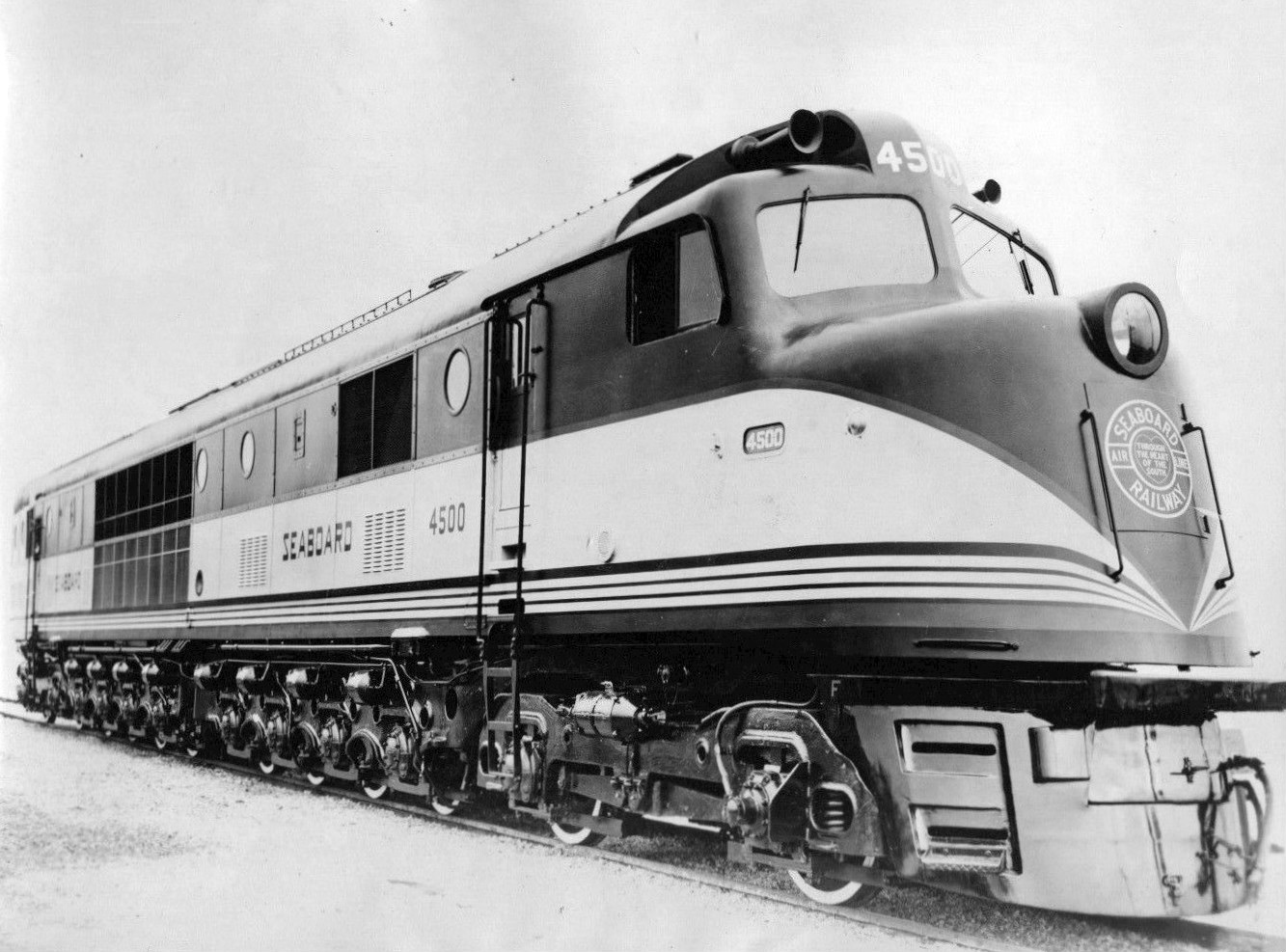
- Newly delivered "Centipede" of the Seaboard Air Line in 1946.
Type and origin
- Power type: Diesel-electric
- Builder: Baldwin Locomotive Works
- Serial number: 71579, 72672-72685, 73129-73130, 73141-73147, 73390-73395, 73131A1, 73131A2, 73377A1-73387A1, 73377A2-73387A2
- Model: DR-12-8-1500/2
- Build date: December 1945 – July 1948
- Total produced: 54
Specifications
- Configuration
  - Whyte: 4-8-0+0-8-4DE
  - AAR: 2-D+D-2
  - UIC: (2′Do)+(Do2′)
- Gauge: 4 ft 8 1/2 in (1,435 mm) standard gauge
- Length: 91 ft 6 in (27.89 m)
- Loco weight: 595,000 lb (269,900 kilograms)
- Fuel capacity: 3,500 US gal (2,900 imp gal; 13,000 L)
- Prime mover: Two 608SC
- Engine type: Four-stroke diesel
- Aspiration: Turbocharger
- Displacement: 15,832 cu in (259.44 L) (× 2)
- Generator: Westinghouse 471A
- Traction motors: Westinghouse 370F (8)
- Cylinders: 8 (× 2)
- Transmission: Electric
- Gear ratio: 15:63 (65 mph); 19:60 (82 mph); 21:58 (93.5 mph); 22:57 (100 mph); 23:56 (106 mph); 25:54 (120 mph)
- Loco brake: Straight air
- Train brakes: Air
Performance figures
- Maximum speed: 65–120 mph (105–193 km/h)
- Power output: 3,000 hp (2,240 kW)
- Tractive effort: 102,500 lbf (455.94 kN)
Career
- Operators: Pennsylvania Railroad, Seaboard Air Line, National Railways of Mexico
- Class: PRR- BP60 NdeM- DE-12
- Locale: North America
- Disposition: All scrapped

The Baldwin DR-12-8-1500/2 (known informally as the Centipede) was the Baldwin Locomotive Works' first serious attempt at a production road diesel locomotive. The Baldwin type designation was 'DR-12-8-1500/2,' meaning Diesel Road locomotive, with 12 axles (8 of which were driven), and two engines of 1,500 horsepower (1,100 kW) each. The trucks were configured in a 2-D+D-2 wheel arrangement. The nickname came from the numerous axles set in a nearly unbroken line, much like the legs of a centipede.

== History ==
Built between December 1945 and July 1948, the "Babyface" design reflected Baldwin steam and electric locomotive practice. The carbody rode on two massive articulated cast steel half-frames cast by General Steel Castings, linked at the middle with a hinged joint. Unpowered four-wheel trucks at each end guided the locomotive through curves for stability at speed. Internal wiring was passed through metal conduits exactly like those used on a steam locomotive, which proved troublesome in practice.

The prototype 2-unit set was built in 1945 and toured American railroads. Orders followed from the Pennsylvania Railroad, the Seaboard Air Line Railroad, and the National Railways of Mexico (NdeM). The two demonstrators (originally ordered by Union Pacific Railroad as #998 and #999) were never sold and were eventually scrapped. The "Centipedes" were essentially obsolete during production, unable to compete with the more advanced locomotive design and technology offered by EMD.

Reliability was an ongoing problem, and as they were built one at a time (like steam locomotives) each one was a bit different in the placement of wiring and equipment, which complicated even routine maintenance. The PRR units were eventually derated and relegated to helper service. Most PRR and SAL units were scrapped by the early 1960s, while NdeM units lasted slightly longer and were in service until the late 1960s. No Centipedes have been preserved.

The models manufactured for Ferrocarriles Nacionales de México (NdeM) were sent back to Baldwin shops to receive the MU receptacles in order to work in a trailing position with other locomotives. Those Mexican Centipedes end their days as Helper Service in División San Luis, for the "Carneros" hill.

== Original buyers ==
Image	Railroad	Quantity	Road numbers	Serial Numbers	Notes
	Baldwin Locomotive Works (demonstrators)	2	6000 A–B	73129, 73130	Not sold (Original UP 998-999)
	Ferrocarriles Nacionales de México	14	6400–6413	72672-72685	
	Pennsylvania Railroad	24	5823A1,2–5834A1,2	73131A1, 73131A2, 73377A1,2-73387A1,2	Renumbered 5811–5834 (not in order)
	Seaboard Air Line	14	4500-4513	71579, 73141-73147, 73390-73395	

== Other information ==
In 1943 Baldwin built an experimental 6,000 horsepower (4,500 kW) "Centipede" as a demonstrator unit, which was assigned road #6000. The uniquely styled unit, with its upright, aggressive prow, also utilized the 2-D+D-2 wheel arrangement, but was to be powered with eight V8 8LV diesel engines, though only four were actually installed. The lone unit was classified by Baldwin as the 4-8-8-4-750/8DE1 and scrapped soon after production, and its running gear was used for the Seaboard Air Line’s first centipede #4500.
