= Baldwin Locomotive Works =

American manufacturer of railroad locomotives from 1825 to 1956

Coordinates: 39°51′33″N 75°19′38″W

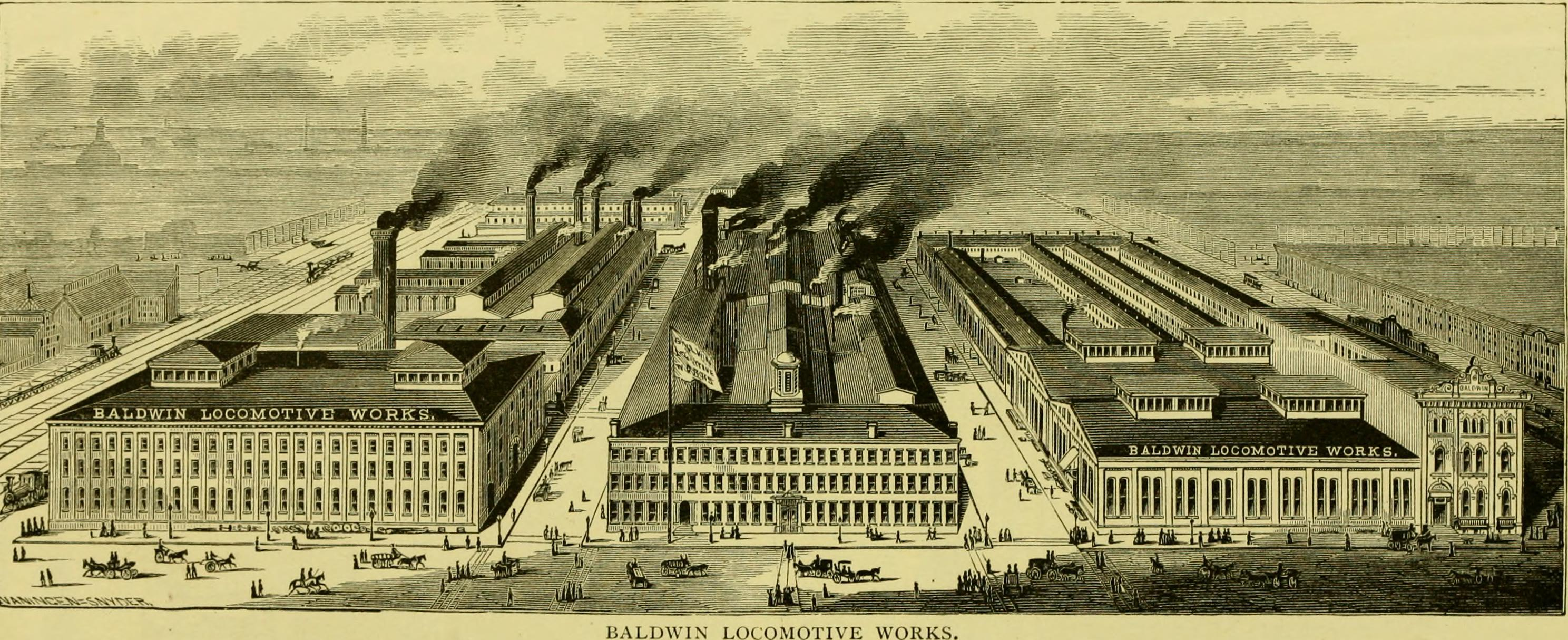
- Baldwin Locomotive Works in 1875
- Industry: Railway
- Founded: 1825; 201 years ago
- Founder: Matthias W. Baldwin
- Defunct: 1951
- Fate: Merged with Lima-Hamilton Corporation in September 1951.
- Successor: Baldwin-Lima-Hamilton Corporation
- Headquarters: Eddystone, Pennsylvania, United States
- Products: Locomotives

Pennsylvania Historical Marker
- Official name: Baldwin Locomotive Works
- Type: Roadside
- Criteria: Business & Industry, Railroads
- Designated: September 26, 2009

The Baldwin Locomotive Works (BLW) was an American manufacturer of railway locomotives from 1825 to 1951. Originally located in Philadelphia, Pennsylvania, it moved to nearby Eddystone in the early 20th century. The company was for decades the world's largest producer of steam locomotives, but struggled to compete when demand switched to diesel locomotives. Baldwin produced the last of its 70,000-plus locomotives in 1951, before merging with the Lima-Hamilton Corporation on September 11, 1951, to form the Baldwin-Lima-Hamilton Corporation.

The company has no relation to the E.M. Baldwin and Sons of New South Wales, Australia, a builder of small diesel locomotives for sugar cane railroads.

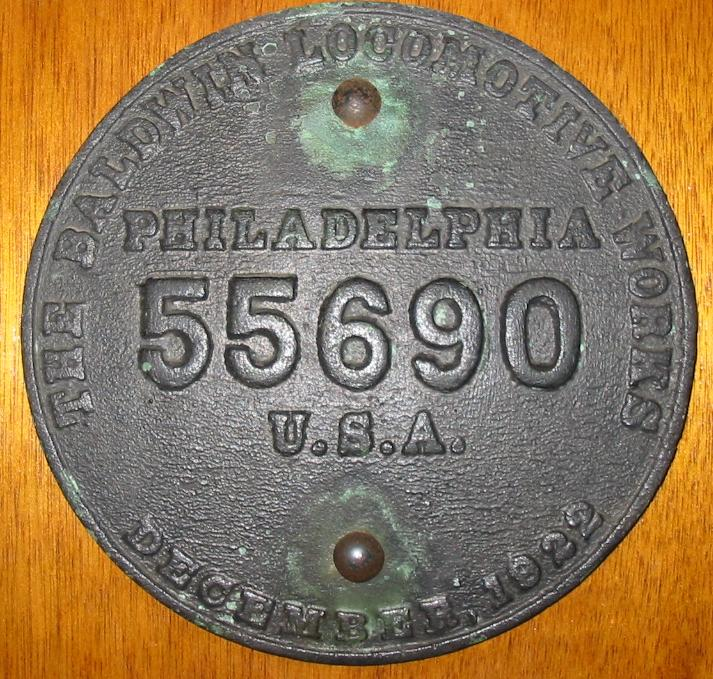
Baldwin Locomotive Works builder's plate, 1922

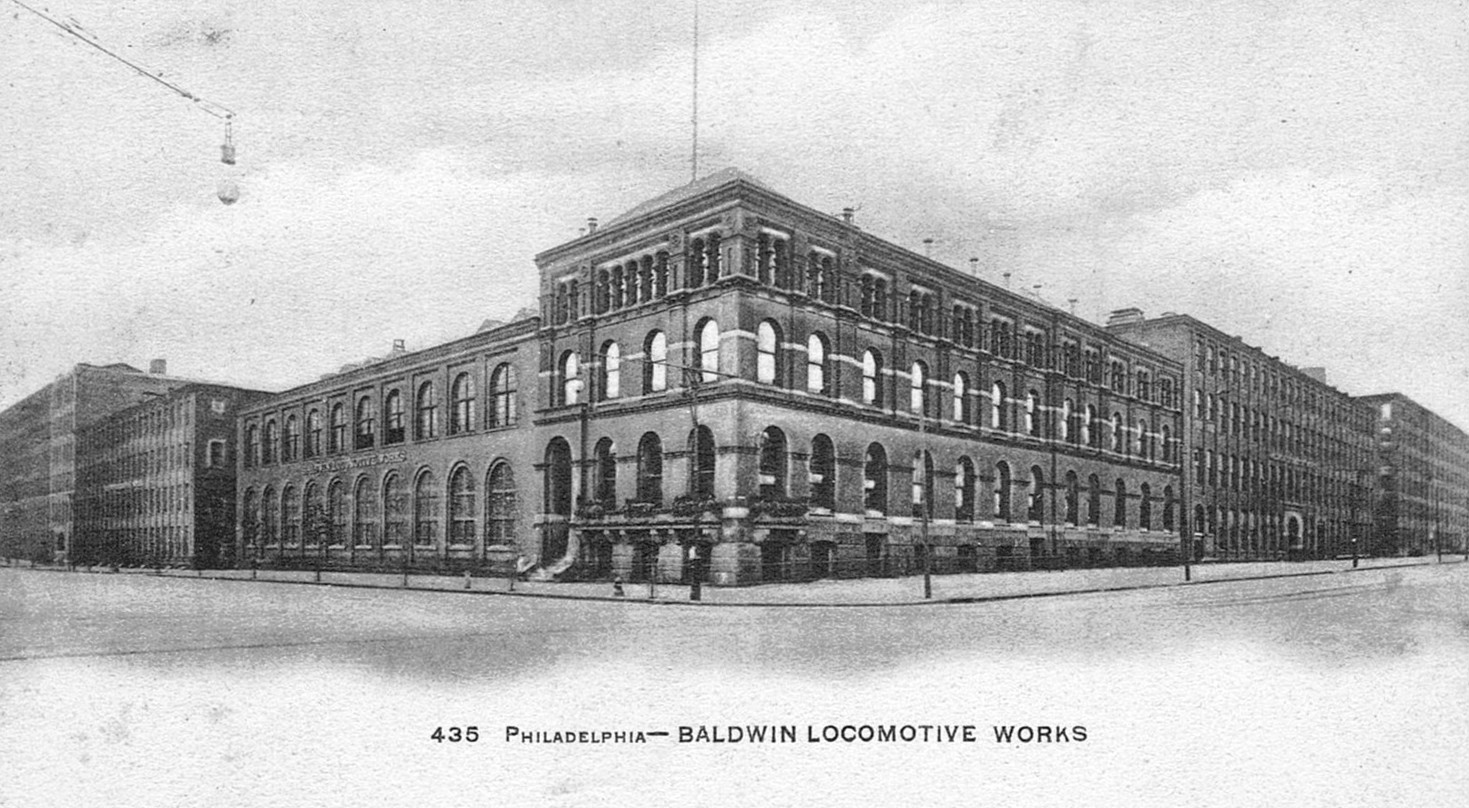
Baldwin Locomotive Works c. 1900

== History: 19th century ==
=== Beginning ===
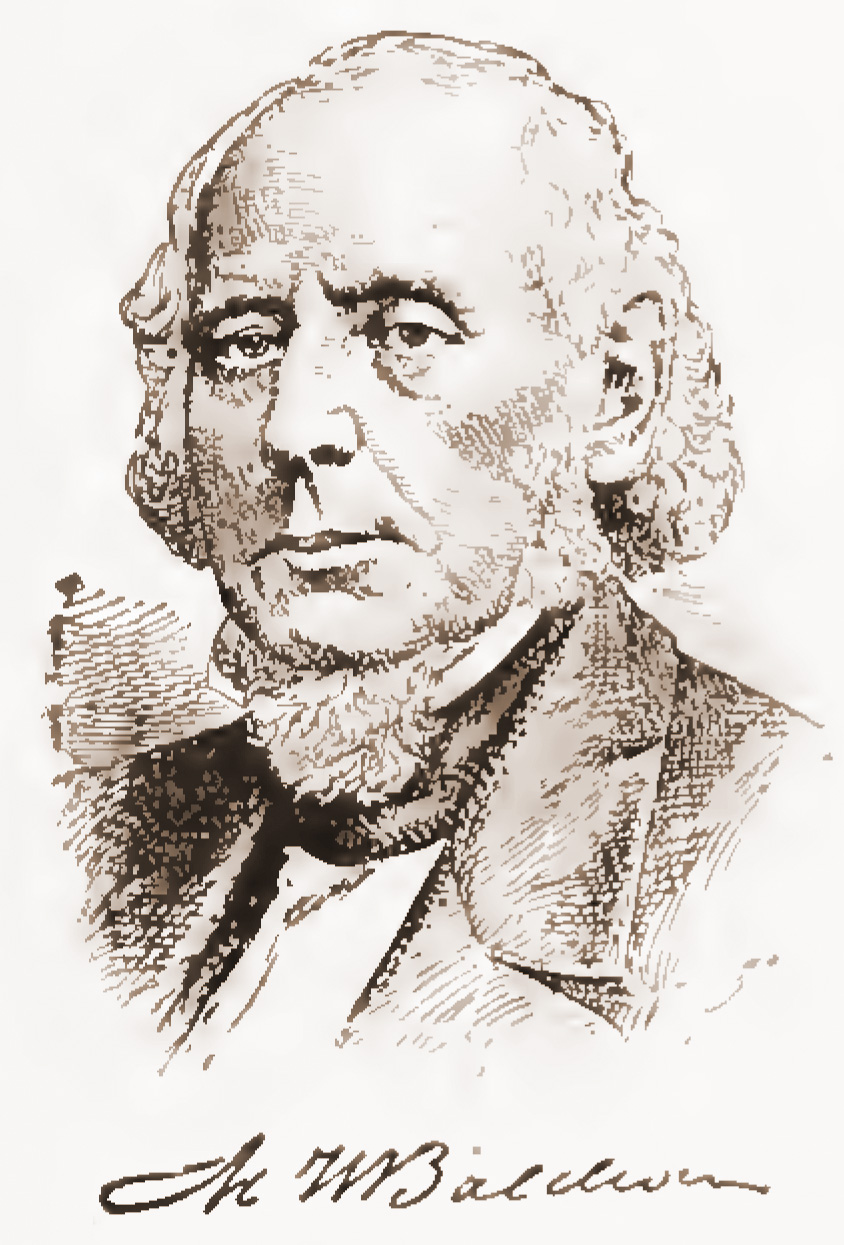
Matthias W. Baldwin, the company's founder

Matthias W. Baldwin, the founder, was a jeweler and whitesmith, who, in 1825, formed a partnership with machinist David H. Mason, and began making bookbinders' tools and cylinders for calico printing. Baldwin then designed and constructed a small stationary steam engine for his own use. This proved so successful and efficient that he was asked to build others like it. The original engine was in use and powered many departments of the works for well over 60 years, and is currently on display at the Smithsonian Institution in Washington D.C.

In 1831, Baldwin built a miniature locomotive for exhibition at the request of the Philadelphia Museum, which was such a success that he received an order from a railway company for a locomotive to run on a short line to the suburbs of Philadelphia. The Camden & Amboy Railroad (C&A) had already imported their John Bull locomotive from England, and it was stored in Bordentown, New Jersey awaiting assembly when Baldwin inspected it, noting the principal dimensions of the parts.

Without the benefit of modern machine tools the cylinders were bored by a chisel fixed in a block of wood and turned by hand; the workmen had to be taught how to do nearly all the work; and Baldwin did a great deal of it himself. The locomotive Old Ironsides was completed and successfully tested on the Philadelphia, Germantown and Norristown Railroad on November 23, 1832. It worked the line for over 20 years. It weighed a little over five tons with four 54 inches (1.4 m) diameter driving wheels and 9 1/2 inches (24 cm) bore by 18 inches (46 cm) stroke cylinders. The wheels had heavy cast iron hubs, with wooden spokes and rims and wrought iron tires, and the outside frame was made of wood. The 30 inches (0.76 m) diameter boiler took 20 minutes to raise steam. Top speed was 28 mph (45 km/h).

=== Early years ===
Baldwin struggled to survive the Panic of 1837. Production fell from 40 locomotives in 1837 to just nine in 1840 and the company was heavily in debt. As part of the survival strategy, Matthias Baldwin took on two partners, George Vail and George Hufty. Although the partnerships proved relatively short-lived, they helped Baldwin pull through the economic hard times.

Zerah Colburn was one of many engineers who had a close association with Baldwin Locomotive Works. Between 1854 (and the start of his weekly paper, the Railroad Advocate) and 1861, when Colburn went to work more or less permanently in London, England, the journalist was in frequent touch with M. W. Baldwin, as recorded in Zerah Colburn: The Spirit of Darkness. Colburn was full of praise for the quality of Baldwin's work.

In the 1850s, railroad building became a national obsession, with many new carriers starting up, particularly in the Midwest and South. While this helped drive up demand for Baldwin products, it also increased competition as more companies entered the locomotive production field.

Still, Baldwin had trouble keeping pace with orders and in the early 1850s began paying workers piece-rate pay. By 1857, the company turned out 66 locomotives and employed 600 men. But another economic downturn, this time the Panic of 1857, cut into business again. Output fell by 50 percent in 1858.

=== 1860–1899 ===
The Civil War at first appeared disastrous for Baldwin. According to John K. Brown in The Baldwin Locomotive Works, 1831–1915: A Study in American Industrial Practice, at the start of the conflict Baldwin had a great dependence on Southern railways as its primary market. In 1860, nearly 80 percent of Baldwin's output went to carriers in states that would soon secede from the Union. As a result, Baldwin's production in 1861 fell more than 50 percent compared to the previous year. However, the loss in Southern sales was counterbalanced by purchases by the United States Military Railroads and the Pennsylvania Railroad, which saw its traffic soar, as Baldwin produced more than 100 engines for carriers during the 1861–1865 war.

By the time Matthias Baldwin died in 1866, his company was vying with Rogers Locomotive & Machine Works for the top spot among locomotive producers. By 1870 Baldwin had taken the lead and a decade later, it was producing 2 1/2 times as many engines as its nearest competitor, according to the U.S. Manufacturing Census.

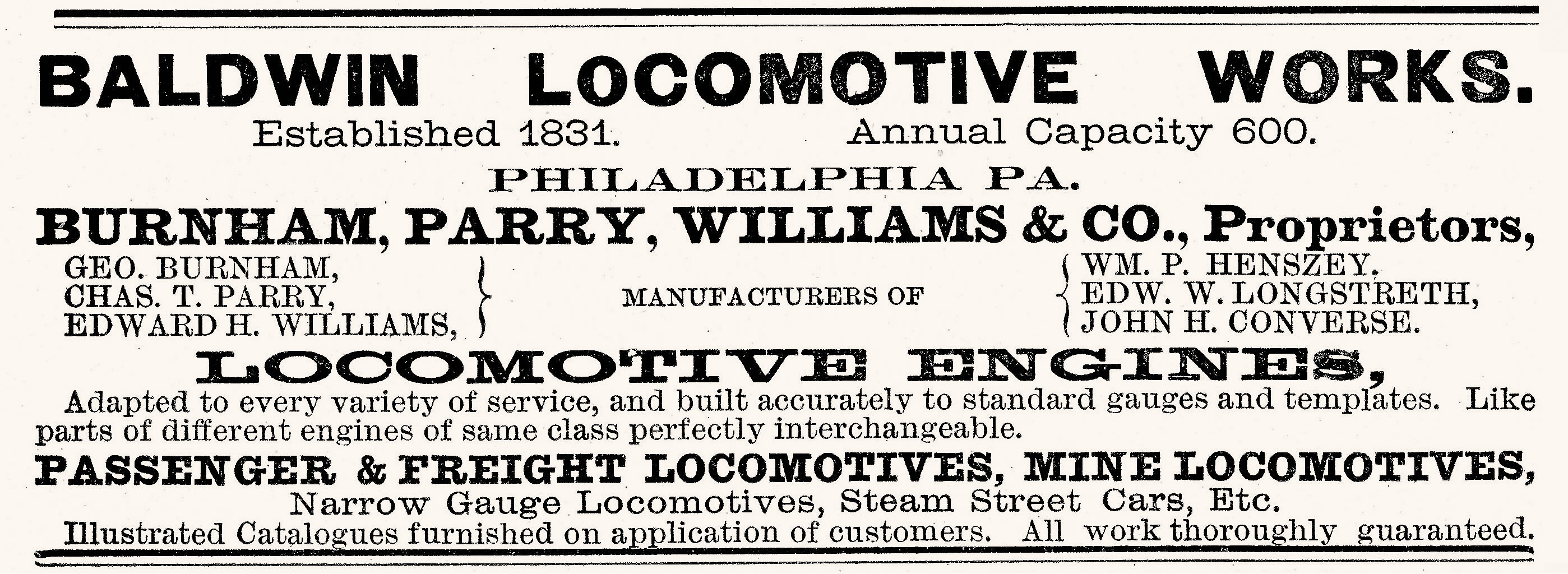
1882 advertisement for the Baldwin Locomotive Works

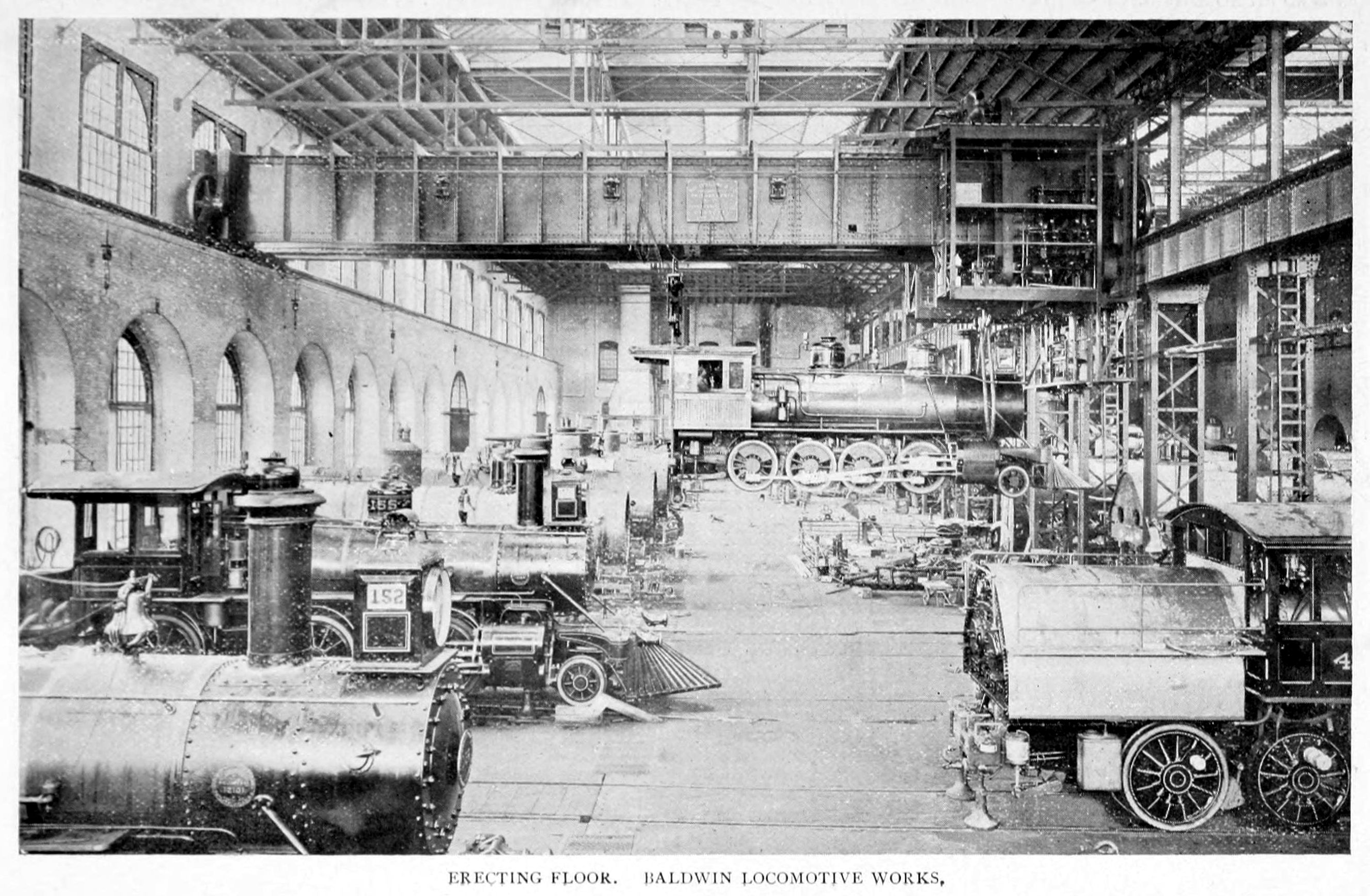
Baldwin Locomotive Works, Erecting Floor, 1896

In 1897 the Baldwin Locomotive Works was presented as one of the examples of successful shop management in a series of articles by Horace Lucian Arnold. The article specifically described the Piece Rate System used in the shop management.

Burton (1899) commented, that "in the Baldwin Locomotive Works... piecework rates are seldom altered... Some rates have remained unchanged for the past twenty years, and a workman is there more highly esteemed when he can, by his own exertions and ability, increase his weekly earnings. He has an absolute incentive to increase his output as much as he possibly can, because he knows that he will not, by increasing his own income, lead to cutting piece-work rates, and so be forced to make still further exertions in order to maintain the same weekly wage."

== History: 20th century ==
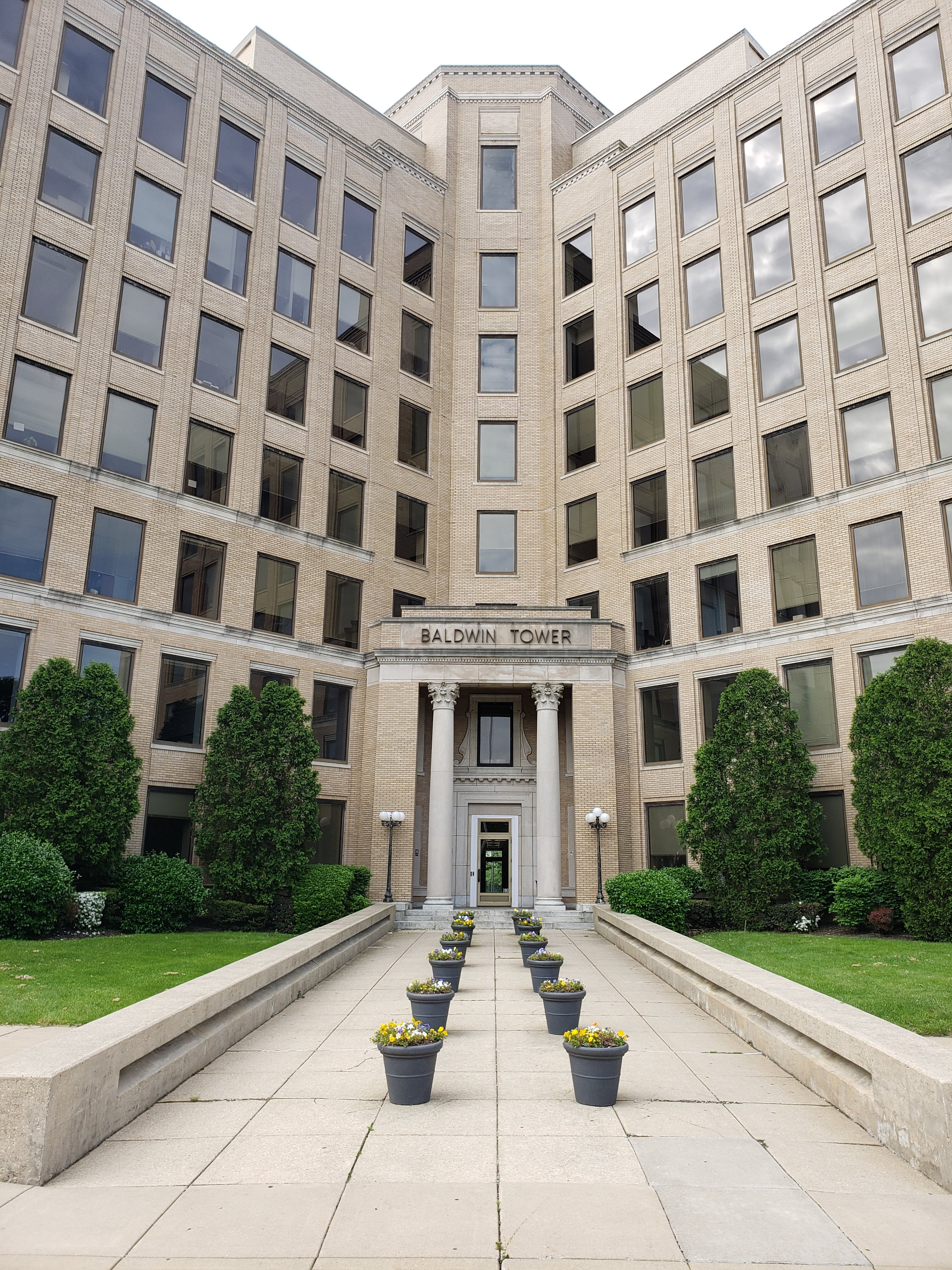
Baldwin Tower in Eddystone, Pennsylvania

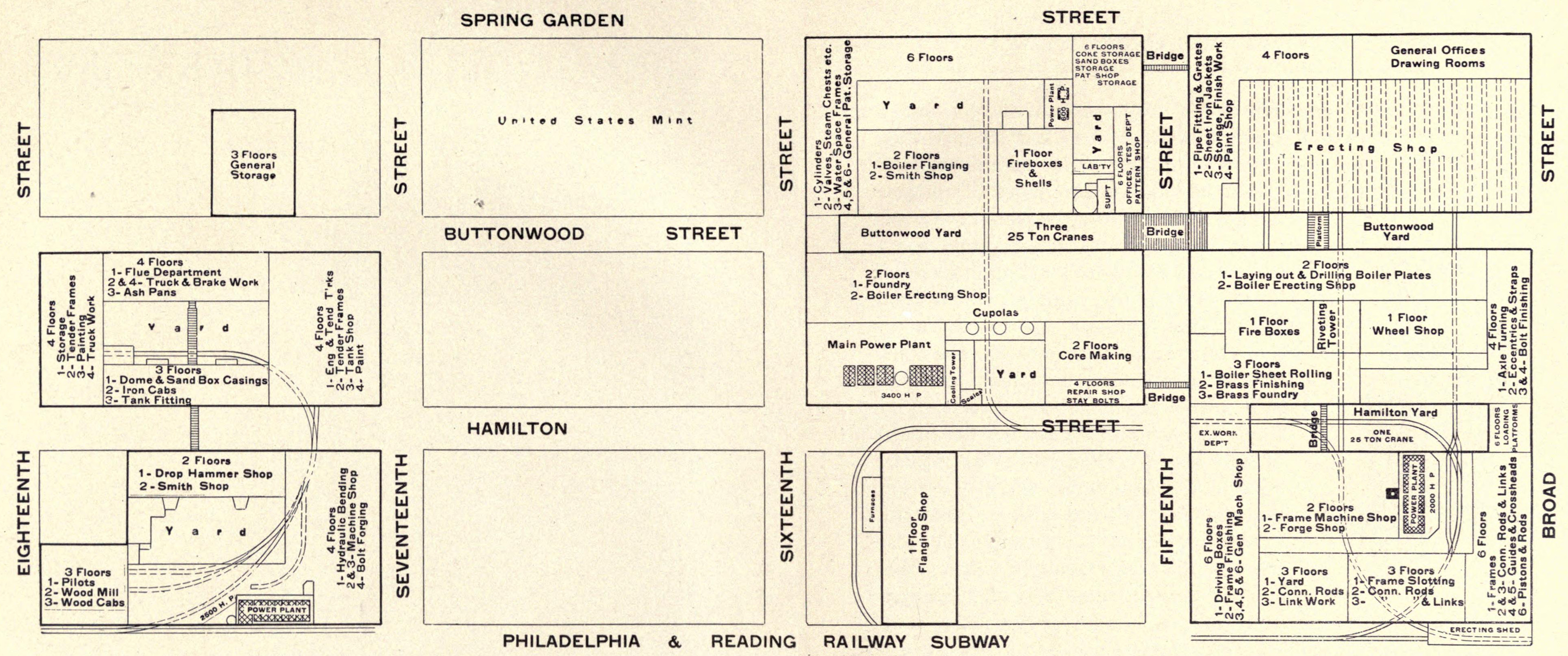
Plan of the Baldwin Locomotive Works in Philadelphia, c. 1903

Initially, Baldwin built many more steam locomotives at its cramped 196-acre (0.79 km^{2}) Broad Street Philadelphia shop but would begin an incremental shift in production to a 616-acre (2.49 km^{2}) site located at Spring Street in nearby Eddystone, Pennsylvania, in 1906. Broad Street was constricted, but even so, it was a huge complex, occupying the better part of 8 square city blocks from Broad to 18th Streets and Spring Garden Street to the Reading tracks just past Noble Street. Eddystone had a capacity of well over 3000 locomotives per year. The move from Broad Street was completed in the late 1920s.

=== Gilded age ===
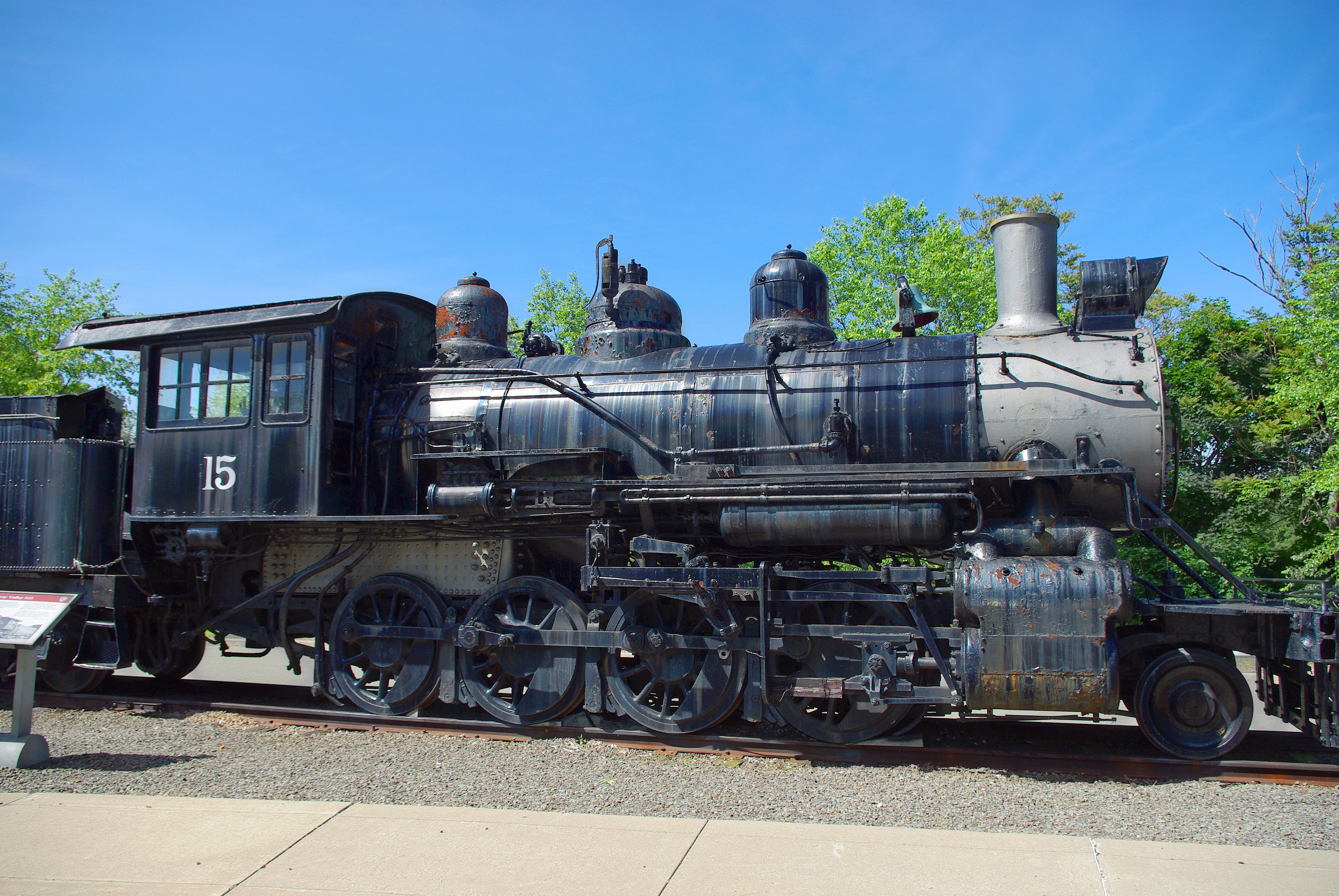
This Baldwin 2-8-0 Consolidation-type locomotive was built for the Oneida & Western Railroad in 1916, and was operated from 1937 to 1953 on the Rahway Valley Railroad's New Jersey short line. Preserved at Steamtown National Historic Site.

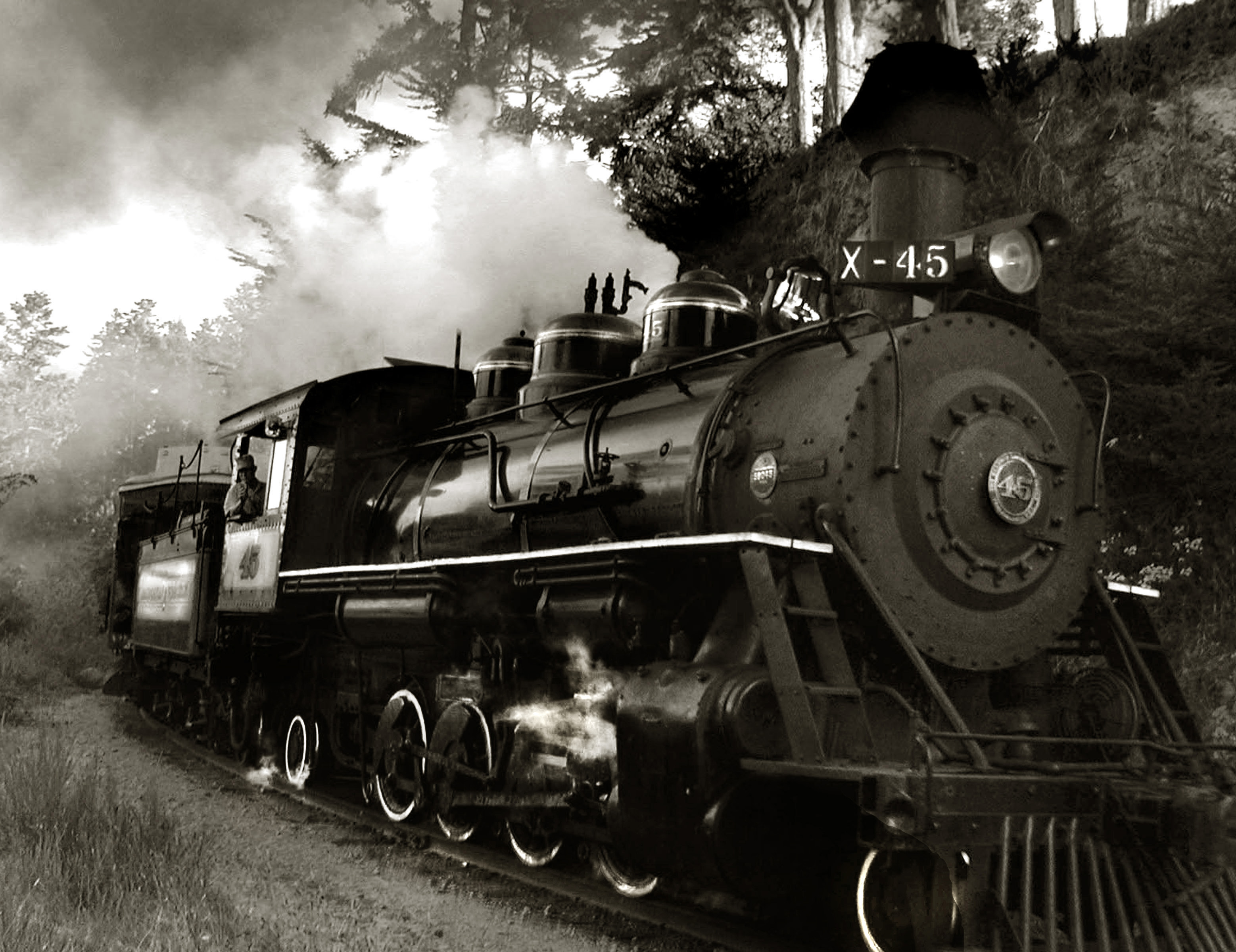
California Western Railroad #45 (builder #58045 of 1924), is a 2-8-2 "Mikado" locomotive still in use on the Skunk Train

The American railroad industry expanded significantly between 1898 and 1907, with domestic demand for locomotives hitting its highest point in 1905. Baldwin's business boomed during this period while it modernized its Broad Street facilities. Despite this boom, Baldwin faced many challenges, including the constraints of space in the Philadelphia facility, inflation, increased labor costs, Labor tensions, the substantial increase in the size of the locomotives being manufactured, and the formation of the American Locomotive Company, an aggressive competitor which eventually became known simply as Alco.

From 1904 to 1943, Baldwin and Westinghouse marketed Baldwin-Westinghouse electric locomotives and A.C. electrification of railroads, particularly to the New Haven Railroad.

In 1906 the Hepburn Act authorized greater governmental authority over railroad companies, and revitalized the Interstate Commerce Commission (ICC), which stepped up its activities. The ICC was given the power to set maximum railroad rates, and to replace existing rates with "just-and-reasonable" maximum rates, as defined by the ICC.

The limitation on railroad rates depreciated the value of railroad securities, and meant that railroads stopped ordering new equipment, including locomotives. The Panic of 1907 in turn disrupted finance and investment in new plants. Both of these events had a direct negative effect on the railroad industry, especially the locomotive builders.

Baldwin's locomotive output dropped from 2,666 in 1906 to 614 in 1908. The company cut its workforce from 18,499 workers in 1907 to 4,600 the following year. Baldwin's business was further imperiled when William P. Henszey, one of Baldwin's partners, died. His death left Baldwin with a US$6 million liability. In response, Baldwin incorporated and released US$10 million worth of bonds. Samuel Vauclain wanted to use these funds to expand Baldwin's capacities so it would be prepared for another boom. While other Baldwin officers opposed this expansion, Vauclain's vision won out; Baldwin would continue to expand its Eddystone plant until its completion in 1928. By 1928, the company moved all locomotive production to this location, though the plant would never exceed more than one-third of its production capacity.

=== World War I ===
Baldwin was an important contributor to the Allied war effort in World War I. Baldwin built 5,551 locomotives for the Allies including separate designs for Russian, French, British and United States trench railways. Baldwin built railway gun carriages for the United States Navy and manufactured 6,565,355 artillery shells for Russia, Great Britain and the United States. From 1915 to 1918, Remington Arms subcontracted the production of nearly 2 million Pattern 1914 Enfield and M1917 Enfield rifles to the Baldwin Locomotive Works. Baldwin expanded its Eddystone, Pennsylvania works into the Eddystone Arsenal, which manufactured most of these rifles and artillery shells before being converted to locomotive shops when the war ended.

Following the war Baldwin continued to supply export orders, as the European powers strove to replace large numbers of locomotives either worn out or destroyed during the war, as European locomotive factories were still re-tooling from armaments production back to railroad production. In 1919 and 1920 Baldwin supplied 50 4-6-0 locomotives to the Palestine Military Railway that became the Palestine Railways H class.

=== Decline ===
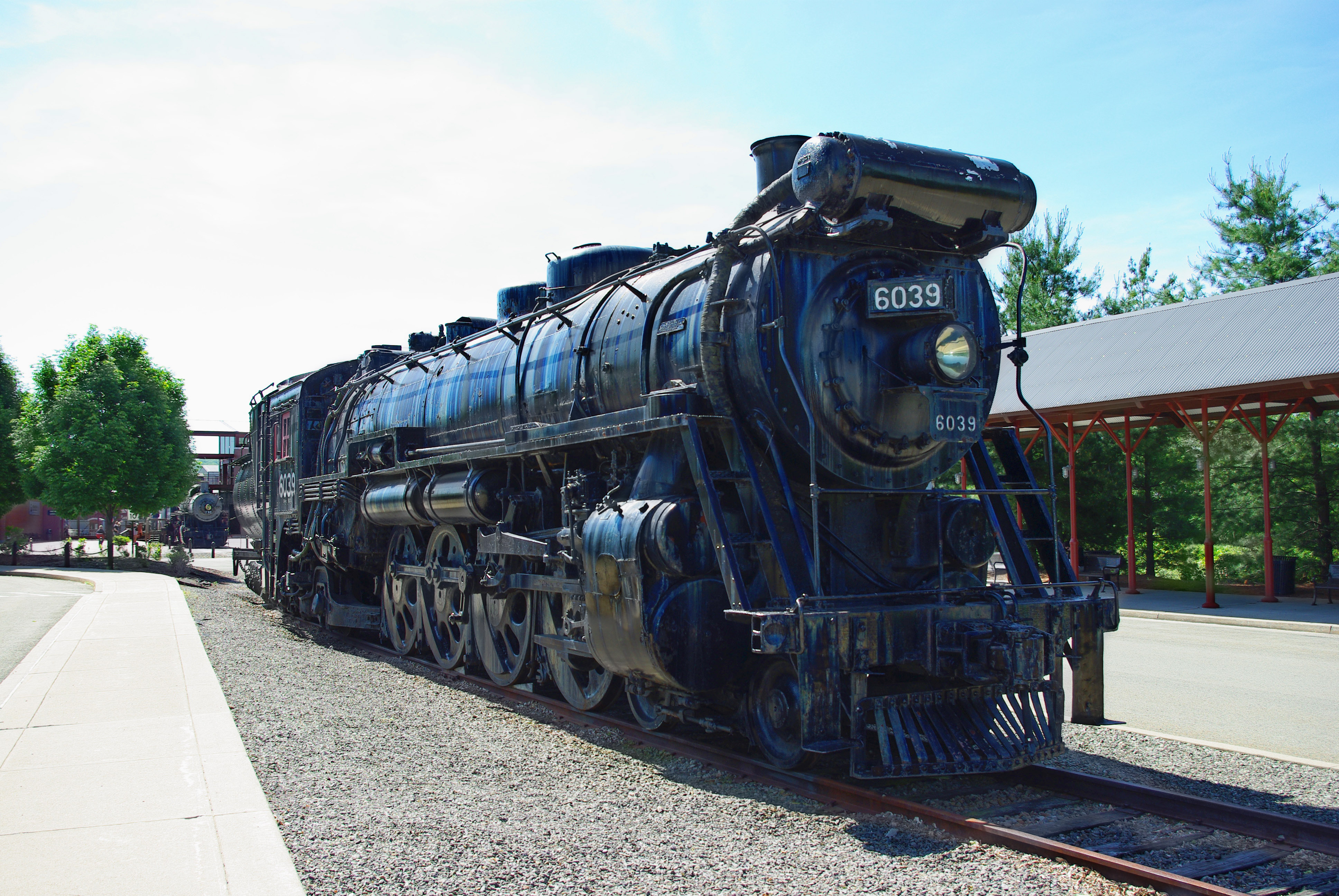
Grand Trunk Western Railroad purchased 4-8-2 Mountain locomotives from Baldwin in 1925. No. 6039, burns coal, and has a Vanderbilt tender, and an enclosed all-weather cab. Preserved at Steamtown National Historic Site.

After the boom years of World War I and its aftermath, Baldwin's business would decline as the Great Depression gripped the country and diesel locomotives became the growth market on American railways towards the end of the 1930s. During the 1920s the major locomotive manufacturers had strong incentives to maintain the dominance of the steam engine. The Baldwin-Westinghouse consortium, which had produced electric locomotives since 1904, was in fact the first American locomotive builder to develop a road diesel locomotive, in 1925. Its twin-engine design was not successful, and the unit was scrapped after a short testing and demonstration period. Westinghouse and Baldwin collaborated again in 1929 to build switching and road locomotives (the latter through Baldwin's subsidiary Canadian Locomotive Company). The road locomotives, Canadian National class V1-a, No. 9000 and No. 9001, proved expensive, unreliable, frequently out of service, and were soon retired. Westinghouse cancelled its efforts in the diesel locomotive field with the onset of the Great Depression, opting to supply electrical parts instead. The early, unsuccessful efforts of Baldwin-Westinghouse in developing diesel-electric locomotion for mainline service led Baldwin in the 1930s to discount the possibility that diesel could replace steam. In 1930 Samuel Vauclain, chairman of the board, stated in a speech that advances in steam technology would ensure the dominance of the steam engine until at least 1980. Baldwin's vice president and Director of Sales stated in December 1937 that "Some time in the future, when all this is reviewed, it will be found that our railroads are no more dieselized than they electrified". Baldwin had deep roots in the steam locomotive industry and may have been influenced by heavy investment in its Eddystone plant, which had left them overextended financially and operating at a fraction of capacity as the market for steam locomotives declined in the 1930s.

In contrast, ALCO, while remaining committed to steam production, pursued R&D paths centered on both steam mainline engines and diesel switch engines in the 1920s and '30s, which would position them to compete in the future market for diesel locomotives.

In 1928 Baldwin began an attempt to diversify its product line to include small internal combustion-electric locomotives but the Great Depression thwarted these efforts, eventually leading Baldwin to declare bankruptcy in 1935. At the invitation of the owners of the Geo D. Whitcomb Company, a small manufacturer of gasoline and diesel industrial locomotives in Rochelle, Illinois, Baldwin agreed to participate in a recapitalization program, purchasing about half of the issued stock. By March 1931 the small firm was in financial trouble and Baldwin filed a voluntary bankruptcy for Whitcomb with Baldwin gaining complete control and creating a new subsidiary, the Whitcomb Locomotive Company. This action would lead to financial losses, an ugly court battle between Baldwin and William Whitcomb, the former owner of the company, and bankruptcy for both parties.

Baldwin lost its dominant position in electric locomotives when the Pennsylvania Railroad selected General Electric's design for what became its GG1 class instead of Baldwin's design in 1934.

When Baldwin emerged from bankruptcy in 1938 it underwent a drastic change in management, which revived the company's development efforts with diesel power, but it was already too far behind. In 1939 Baldwin offered its first standard line of diesel locomotives, all designed for yard service. By this time, Electro-Motive Corporation (EMC) was already ramping up production of diesel passenger locomotives and developing its first diesel road freight locomotive.

As the 1930s drew to a close, Baldwin's coal-country customers such as Pennsylvania Railroad, Chesapeake & Ohio, and Norfolk & Western, were more reluctant than other operators to embrace a technology which could undermine the demand for one of their main hauling markets. All three continued to acquire passenger steam locomotives into the early postwar years, as dieselization was gaining momentum elsewhere in the rail industry.

In the late 1930s Baldwin and the Pennsylvania Railroad made an all-in bet on the future of steam in passenger rail service with Baldwin's duplex-drive S1 locomotive. It proved difficult to operate, prone to slipping, costly to maintain, and unsuited for its intended service. Baldwin developed a revision of the same basic design with the T1, introduced in 1943. While the T1s could operate on more tracks than the S1, they still had many of the problems of the S1, and additional mechanical problems related to their unique valve design. The whole S1-T1 venture resulted in losses for PRR and investment in a dead-end development effort for Baldwin at a critical time for both companies. In the early 1940s Baldwin embarked upon its efforts to develop steam turbine power, producing the S2 direct-drive turbine locomotive in 1944. Baldwin's steam turbine program failed to produce a single successful design. Baldwin's steam-centered development path had left them flat-footed in the efforts necessary to compete in the postwar diesel market dominated by EMC and Alco-GE.

=== World War II ===
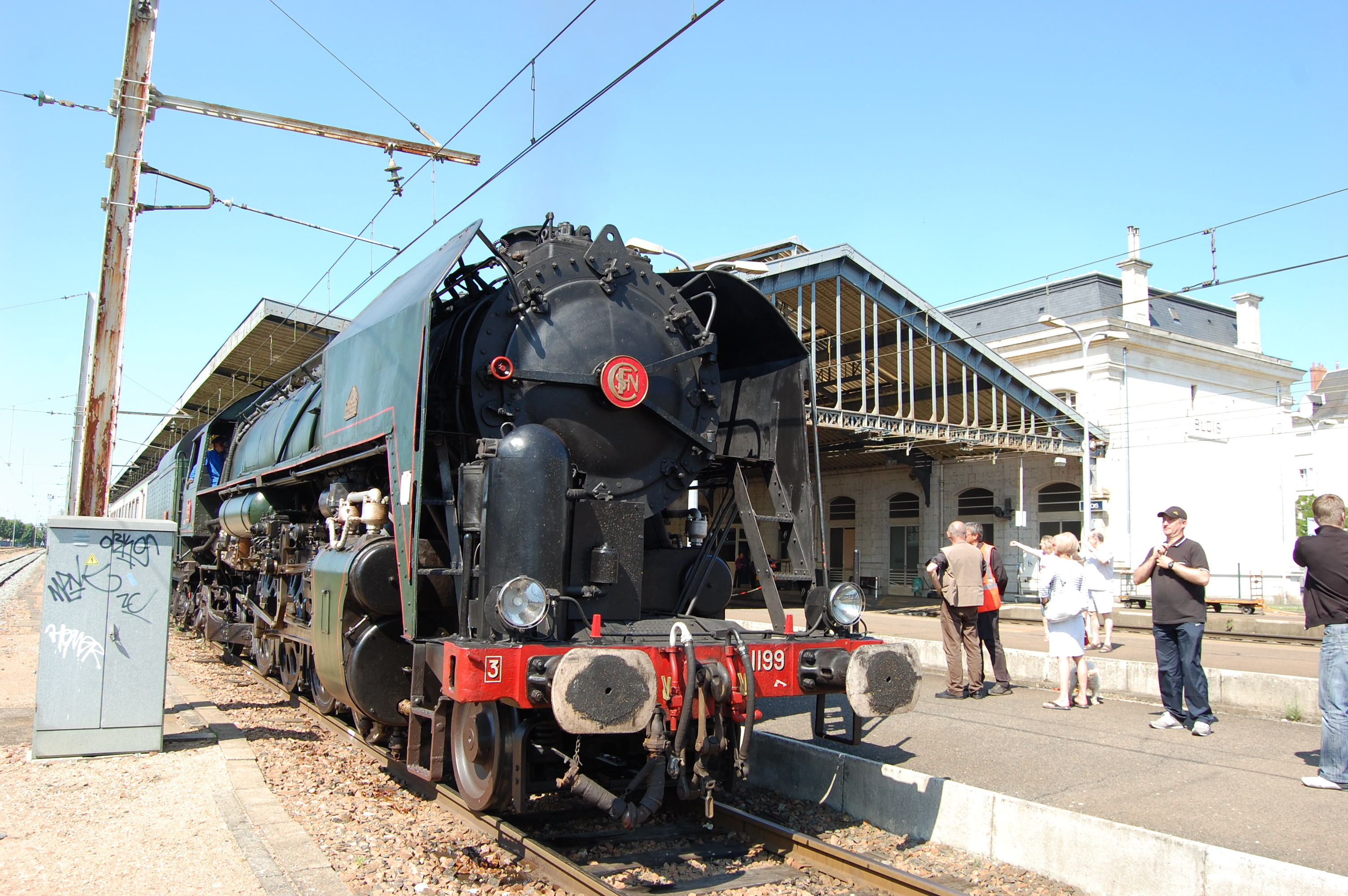
SNCF Class 141R n° 1199, built by Baldwin in 1947, now preserved in Nantes, France

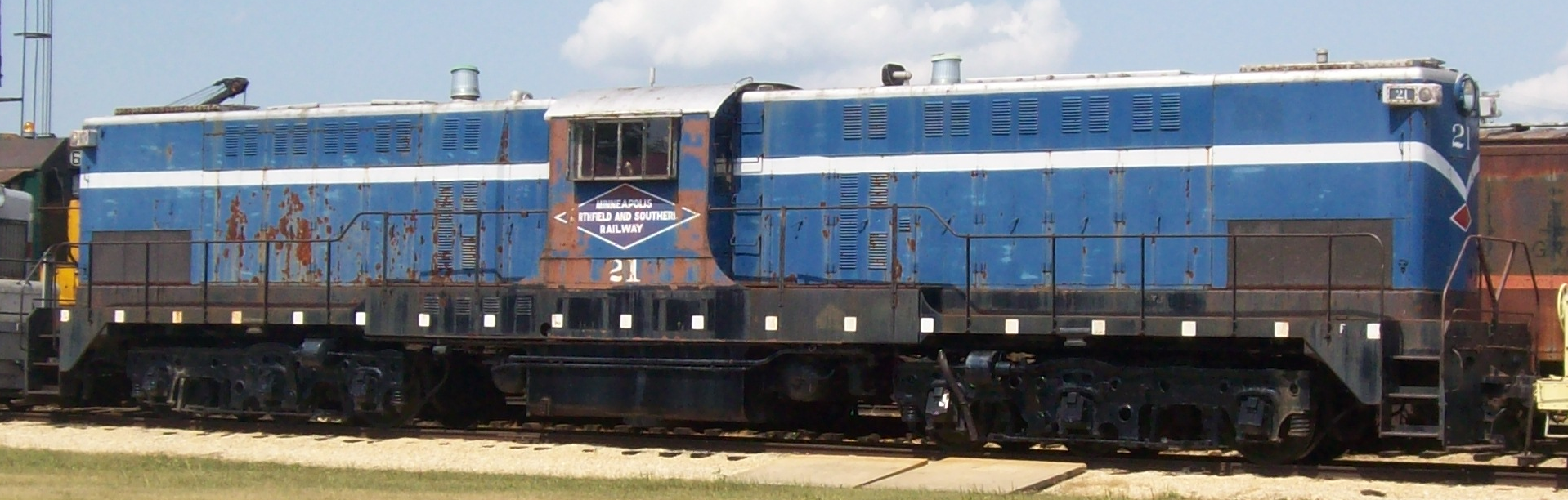
Surviving example of a Baldwin DT-6-6-2000 transfer engine, a post-war diesel electric locomotive produced between 1946 and 1950.

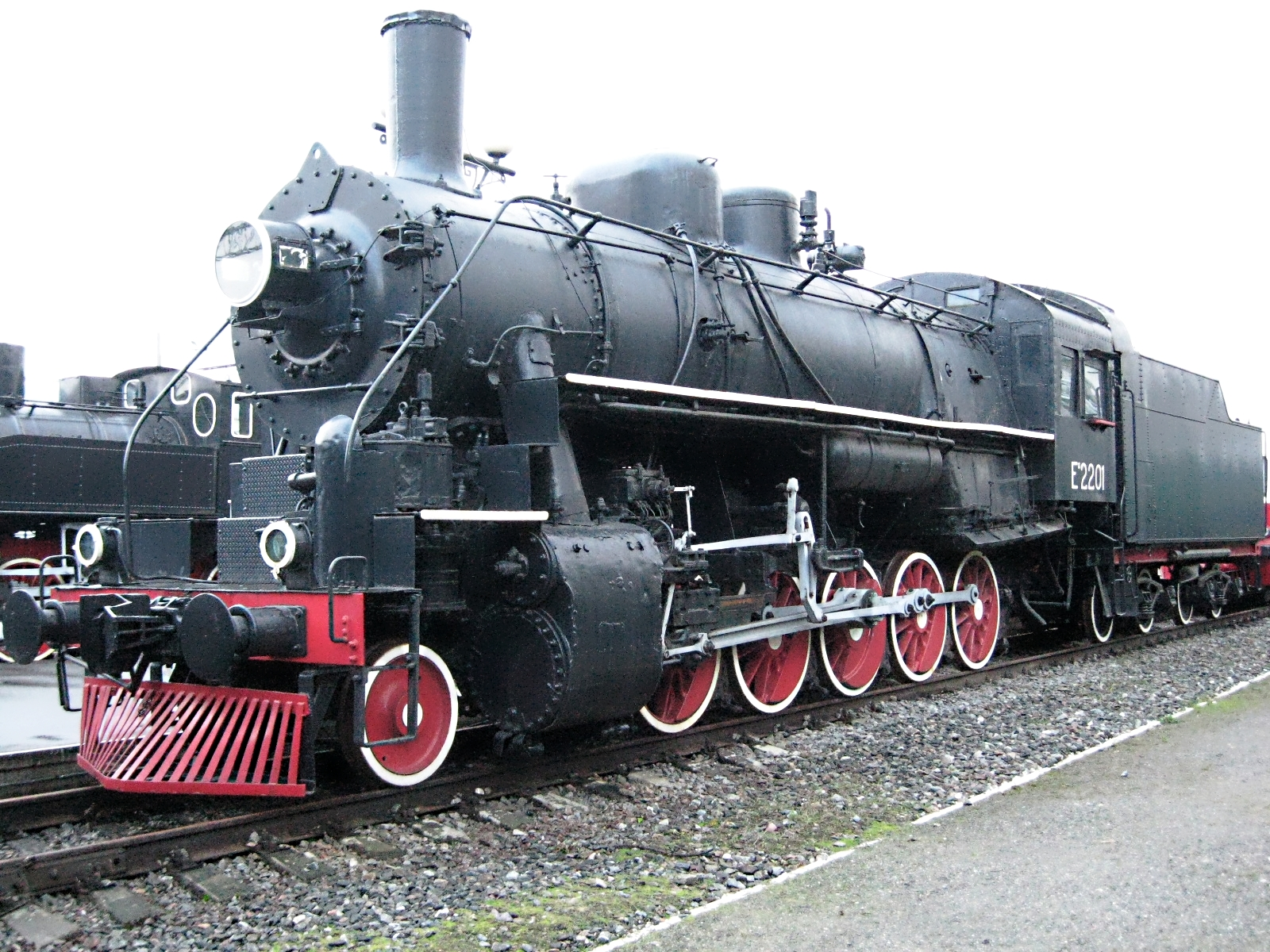
Soviet locomotive Еа-2201 built by Baldwin in 1944)

The United States' entry into World War II impeded Baldwin's diesel development program when the War Production Board dictated that Alco and Baldwin produce only steamers and diesel-electric yard switching engines. The General Motors Electro-Motive Corporation was assigned the task of producing road freight diesels (namely, the FT series). EMC's distinct advantage over its competitors in that product line in the years that followed World War II, due to the head start in diesel R&D and production, is beyond doubt, however, assigning it solely to WPB directives is questionable. Longtime GM chairman Alfred Sloan presented a timeline in his memoir that belies this assumption, saying that GM's diesel-engine R&D efforts of the 1920s and 1930s, and its application of model design standardization (yielding lower unit costs) and marketing lessons learned in the automotive industry, were the principal reason for EMC's competitive advantage in the late 1940s and afterward (clearly implying that the wartime production assignments were merely nails in a coffin that Baldwin and Lima had already built for themselves before the war). In his telling, the R&D needed to adapt earlier diesels (best suited to marine and stationary use) to locomotive use (more flexible output; higher power-to-weight ratio; more reliable given more vibration and less maintenance) was a capital-intensive project that almost no one among the railroad owners or locomotive builders was willing (latter) or able (former) to invest in during the 1920s and 1930s except for the GM Research Corporation led by Charles Kettering, and the GM subsidiaries Winton Engine Corporation and Electro-Motive Corporation.

Baldwin made steam engines for domestic US railroads, the US Army, British railways, and made around one thousand E or Ye type engines for the Soviet Union in the Lend Lease arrangement (of an order of 2000 or so engines with other builders contributing to the total). Baldwin obtained a short-term market boost from naval demand for diesel engines and the petroleum crisis of 1942–43, which boosted demand for their coal-fired steam locomotives while acquisition of EMD's diesel locomotives was in its most restricted period.

In 1943 Baldwin launched its belated road diesel program, producing a prototype "Centipede" locomotive which was later rebuilt to introduce their first major product in the postwar market.

During World War II Baldwin's contributions to the war effort included not only locomotives and switchers but also tanks. Baldwin was one of the manufacturers of several variants of the Light Tank M3 (M3A2, M3A3, M3A5) as well as the Medium Tank M3 (Lee and Grant) and later the M4 Sherman (M4, M4A2). The company also built the M6 Heavy Tank, a prototype trialed by the US Army which never saw operational use.

A Baldwin subsidiary, the Whitcomb Locomotive Company, produced hundreds of 65-ton diesel electric locomotives for the Army and received the Army–Navy "E" Award for production. Baldwin ranked 40th among United States corporations in the value of wartime production contracts.

=== End ===
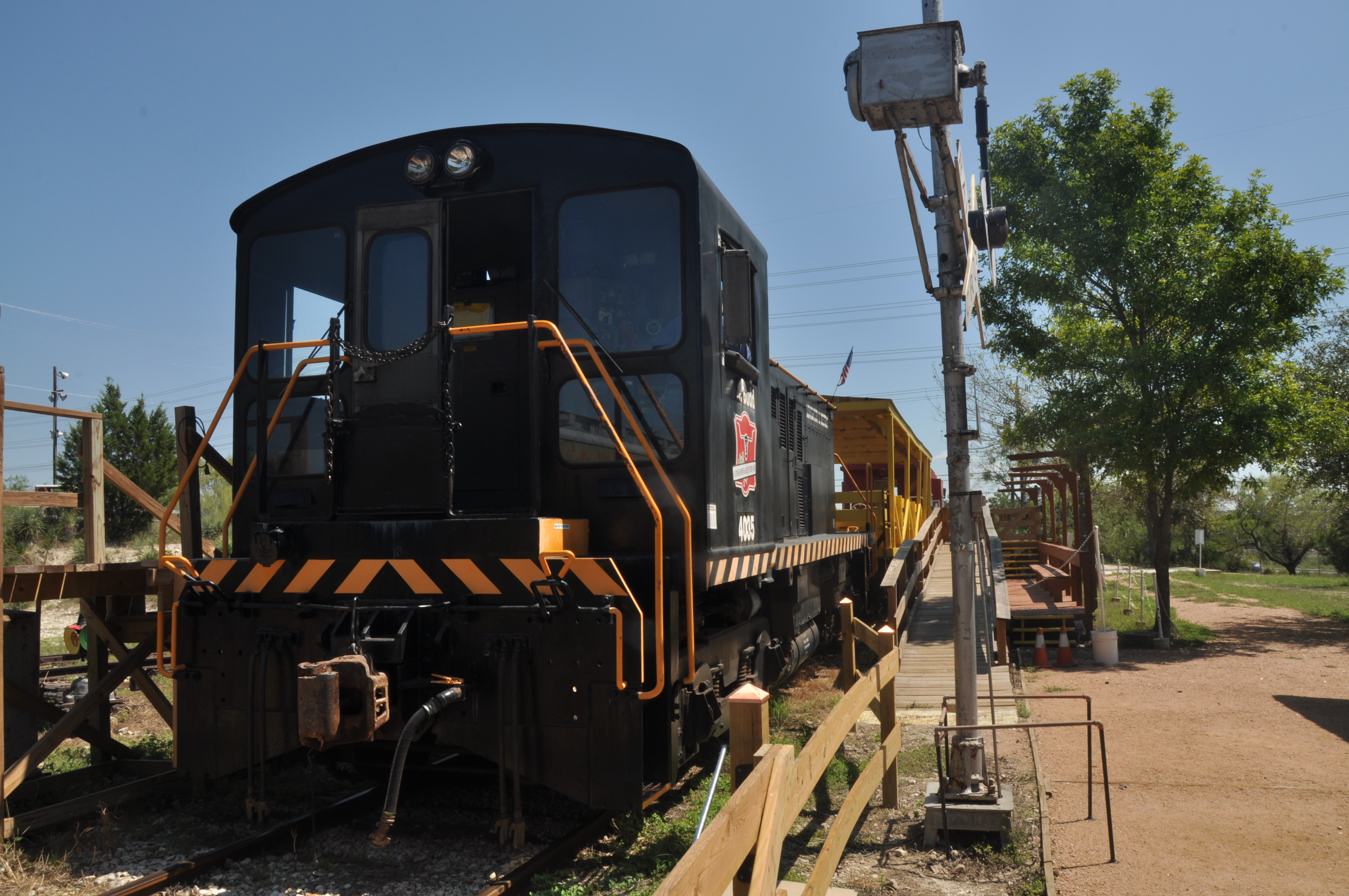
1954 Baldwin B-B diesel-electric switcher at the Texas Transportation Museum

Between 1940 and 1948, domestic steam locomotive sales declined from 30 percent of the market to 2 percent. By 1949, there was no demand for steam locomotives. Baldwin's attempts to adapt to the changed market for road locomotives had been unsuccessful; the reliability of their offerings was unsatisfactory, epitomized by notorious failures such as its Centipede diesel locomotives and their steam turbine-electric locomotives, which proved to be money pits unsuited for their intended service. In July 1948 Westinghouse Electric, which had teamed with Baldwin to build diesel and electric locomotives and wanted to keep their main customer in the rail industry afloat, purchased 500,000 shares, or 21 percent, of Baldwin stock, which made Westinghouse Baldwin's largest shareholder. Baldwin used the money to cover various debts. Westinghouse vice president Marvin Smith became Baldwin's president in May 1949. In a move to diversify into the construction equipment market, Baldwin merged with Lima-Hamilton on December 4, 1950, to become Baldwin-Lima-Hamilton. However, Lima-Hamilton's locomotive technology was unused after the merger and market share continued to dwindle. By January, 1952 Baldwin closed its factory in Rochelle, Illinois and consolidated Whitcomb production at Eddystone. In 1953 Westinghouse discontinued building electrical traction equipment, so Baldwin was forced to reconfigure their drive systems based on General Electric equipment. In 1954, during which time they were being virtually shut out of the diesel market, Baldwin delivered one steam turbine-electric locomotive to the Norfolk & Western, which proved unsatisfactory in service.

The last batch of conventional steam locomotives built by BLH were WG class 9100-9149 as BLH 76039-76088 built in 1955 for the Indian Railways broad gauge.

After locomotive production ended, Hamilton continued to develop and produce engines for other purposes. Baldwin engine production was shifted to the Hamilton plant, but in 1960 the Hamilton engines ceased production, the plant was shuttered, and Baldwin engine production moved back to Eddystone. The last locomotives produced by Baldwin were three experimental RP-210 dual power passenger locomotives for the New York Central and New York, New Haven, & Hartford rail lines in 1956.

In 1956, after 125 years of continuous locomotive production, Baldwin closed most of its Eddystone plant and ceased producing locomotives. The company instead concentrated on production of heavy construction equipment. More than 70,500 locomotives had been built when production ended. In 1965 Baldwin became a wholly owned subsidiary of Armour & Company. Greyhound Corporation purchased Armour & Company in 1970, and the decision was made to liquidate all production. In 1972 Greyhound closed Baldwin-Lima-Hamilton for good. The replacement and renewal parts business was acquired by Ecolaire Inc and became the Baldwin-Hamilton Company - A Division of Ecolaire Inc. and lasted till 1991 to receive license fees from other companies using their designs, which was lucrative. When the licenses ran out, all remaining parts were distributed, and the company dissolved.

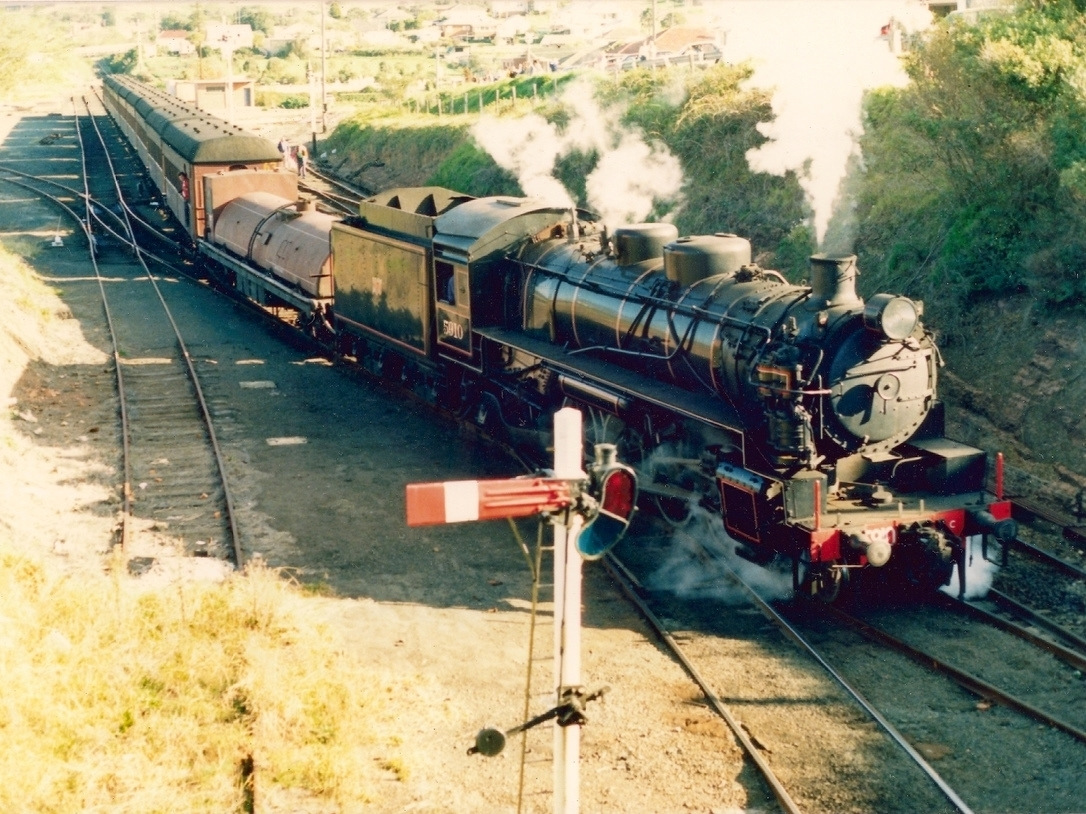
A New South Wales D59 class locomotive built in the 1950s

== Locomotives ==
=== Later steam locomotives ===
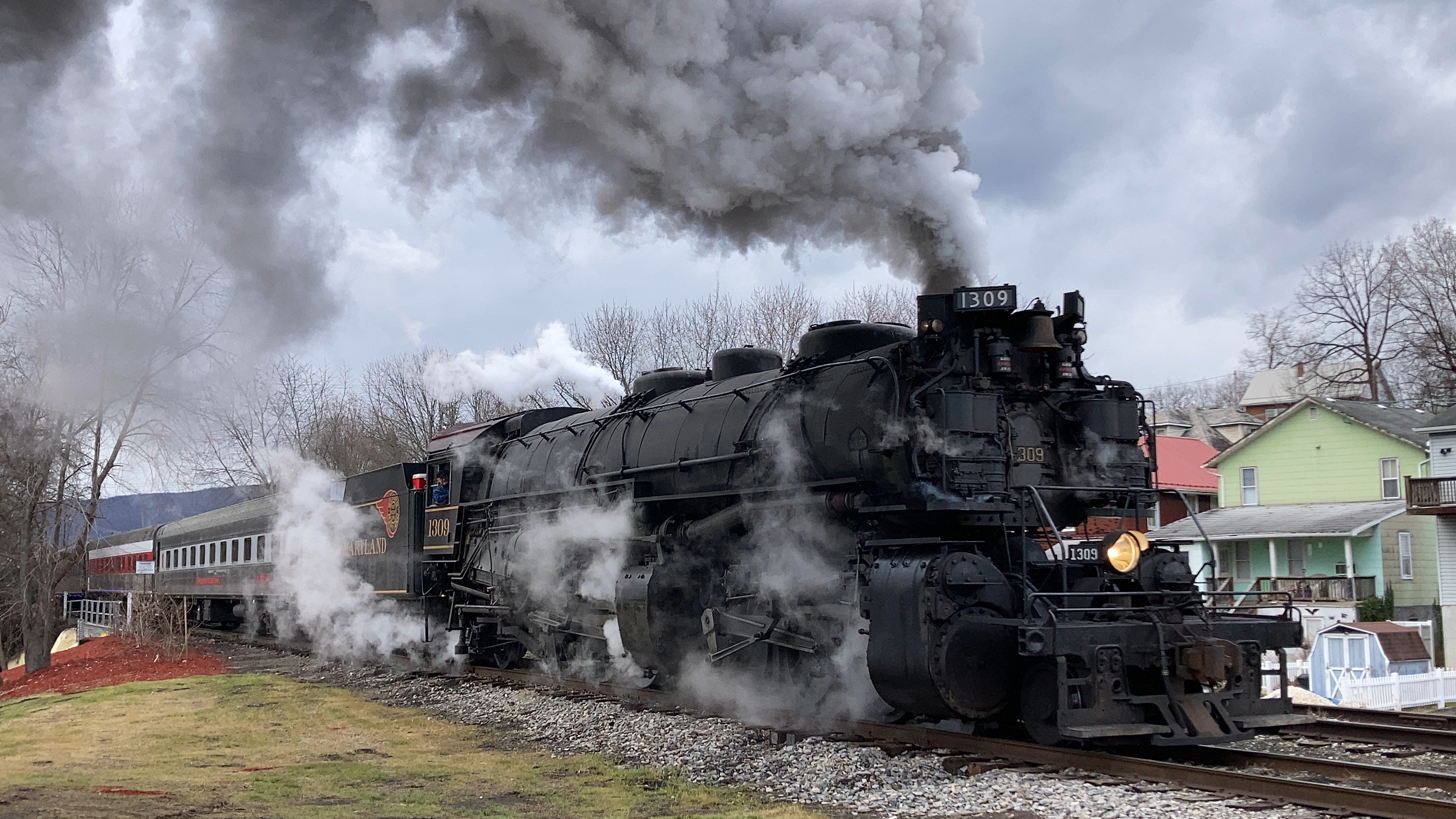
Baldwin's last domestic steam locomotive, 2-6-6-2 Chesapeake & Ohio 1309, built in 1949, in service on the Western Maryland Scenic Railroad.

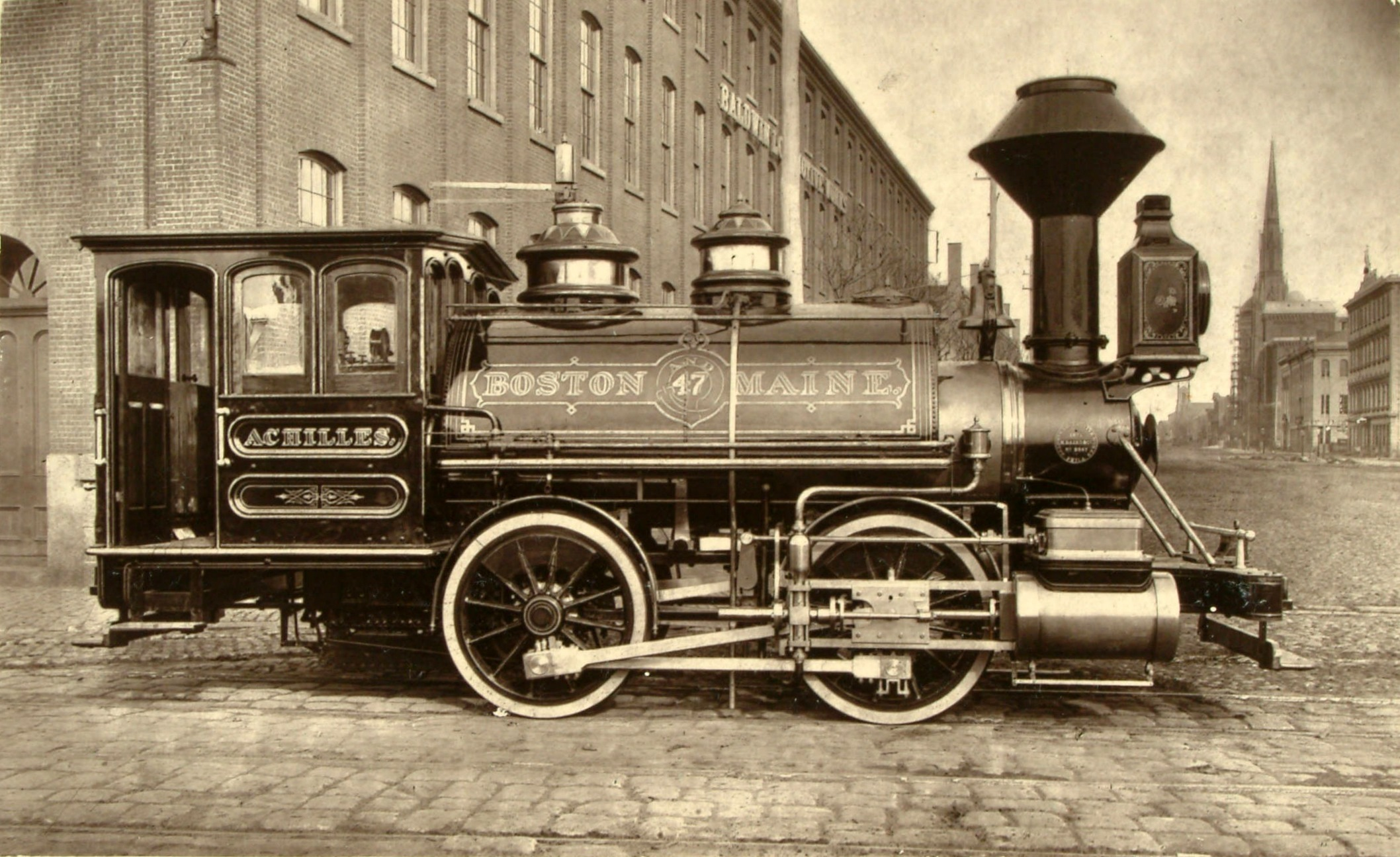
Woodburytype of 0-4-0ST type Boston & Maine Achilles, 1871

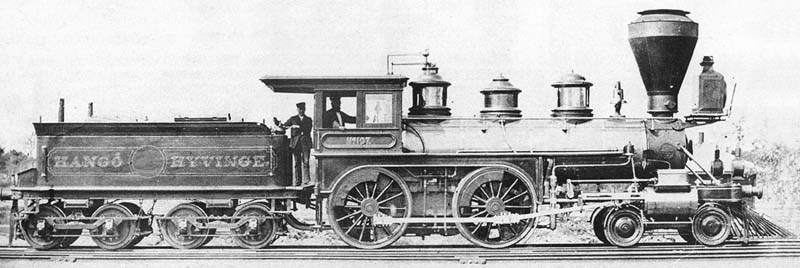
An 1872 Baldwin locomotive of 4-4-0 type used on the Hanko–Hyvinkää railway in Finland.

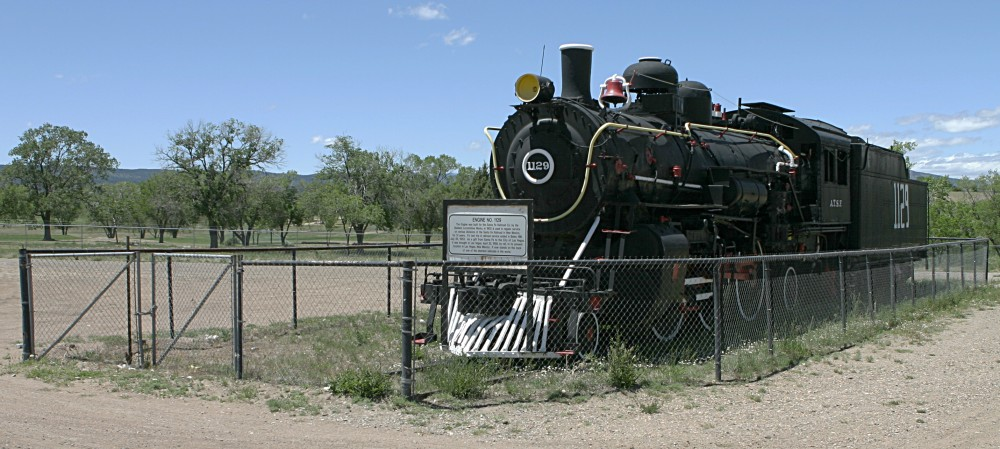
A 1902 Baldwin locomotive of 2-6-2 type used on the Atchison, Topeka & Santa Fe Railway in New Mexico where it is now on permanent display in Las Vegas, New Mexico.

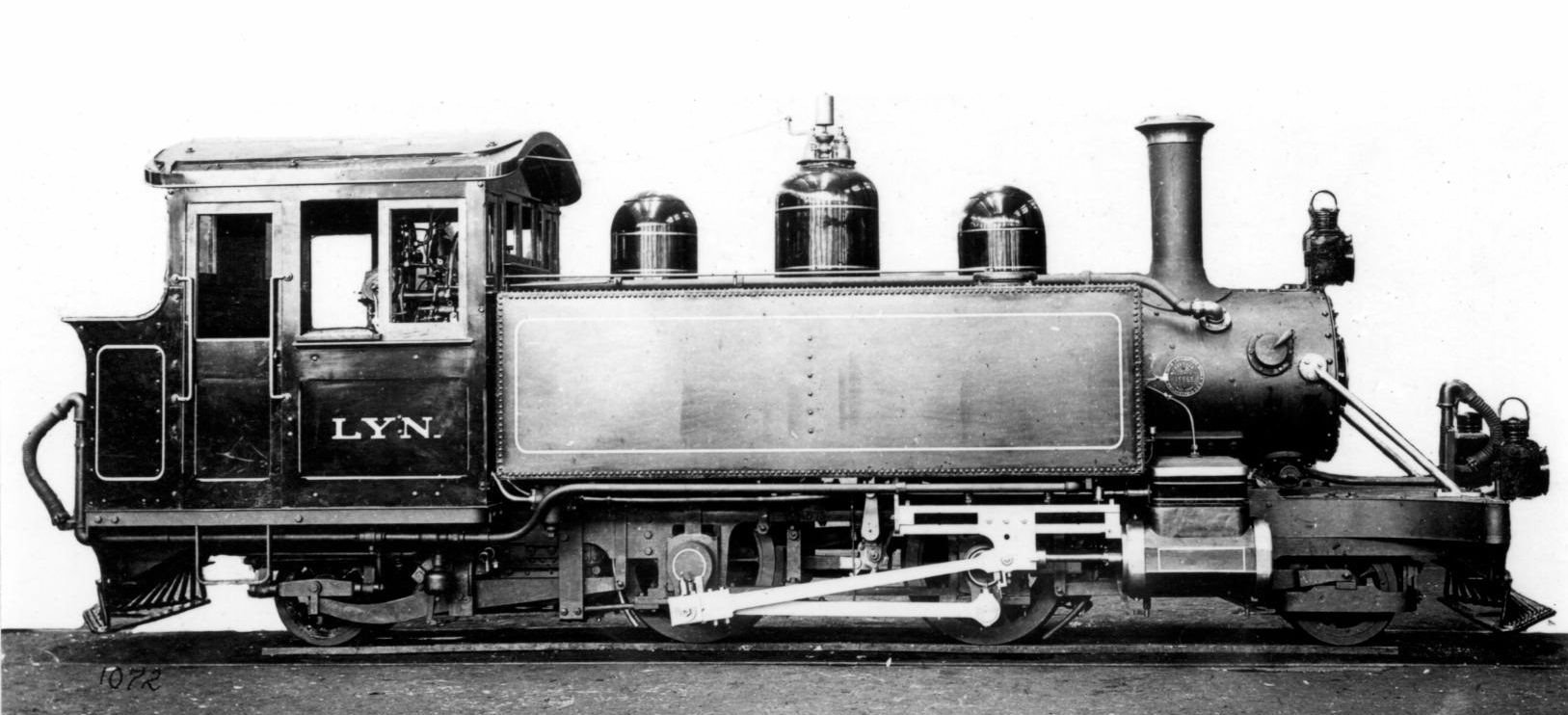
Baldwin works photo of 'Lyn', May 1898

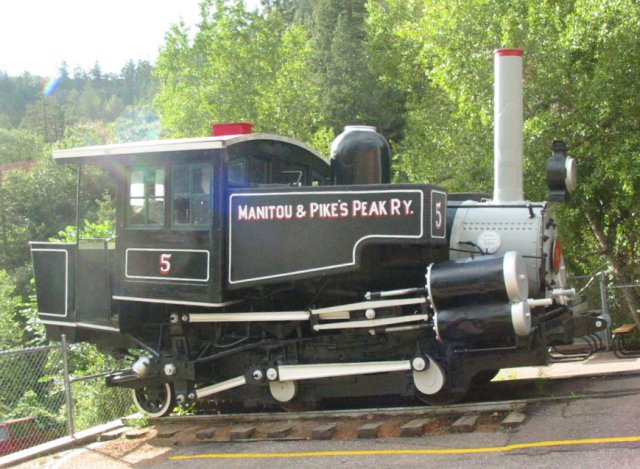
M&PP 5, an 0-4-2T, at the depot in Manitou Springs

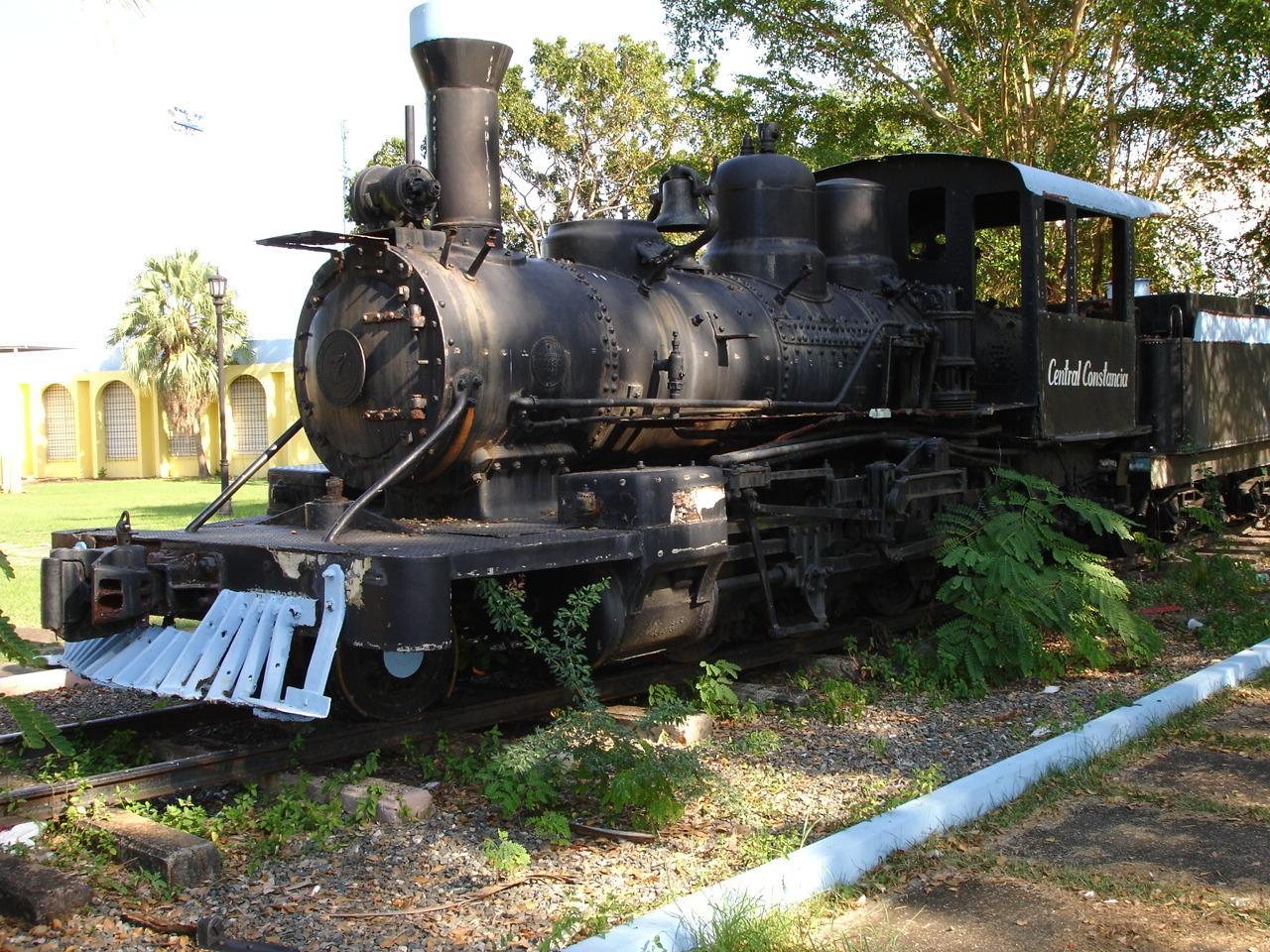
2-8-0 2 ft 6 in (762 mm) narrow-gauge on static display, Toa Baja, Puerto Rico.

Baldwin built many 4-4-0 "American" type locomotives (the locomotive that built America). Surviving examples of which include the 1872 Countess of Dufferin and 1875's Virginia & Truckee Railroad No.22 "Inyo", but it was perhaps best known for the 2-8-2 "Mikado" and 2-8-0 "Consolidation" types. It was also well known for the unique cab-forward 4-8-8-2 articulateds built for the Southern Pacific Company and massive 2-10-2 for the Atchison, Topeka & Santa Fe Railway. Baldwin also produced their most powerful steam engines in history, the 2-8-8-4 "Yellowstone" for the Duluth, Missabe & Iron Range Railway. The Yellowstone could put down over 140,000 lbf (622.8 kN) of Tractive force. They routinely hauled 180 car trains weighing over 18,000 short tons (16,071 long tons; 16,329 t). The Yellowstones were so good that the DM&IR refused to part with them; they hauled ore trains well into the diesel era, and the last one retired in 1963. Three have been preserved. One of Baldwin's last new and improved locomotive designs were the 4-8-4 "Northern" locomotives. Baldwin's last domestic steam locomotives were 2-6-6-2s built for the Chesapeake & Ohio in 1949. Baldwin 60000, the company's 1926 demonstration steam locomotive, is on display at the Franklin Institute in Philadelphia. On a separate note, the restored and running 2-6-2 steam locomotive at Fort Edmonton Park was built by Baldwin in 1919.

==== Preserved Baldwin steam locomotives ====
There are many Baldwin built steam locomotives currently operating in the United States, Canada, and several other countries around the world. Out of all the Baldwin built steam locomotives that are operational or have operated in recent years, the most recognized locomotives are Reading 2101, Reading Blue Mountain and Northern 2102, Grand Canyon Railway 4960, Frisco 1522, Frisco 1630, Nickel Plate Road 587, Reading Blue Mountain and Northern 425, Western Maryland Scenic Railroad 734, Southern Pacific 2467, Southern Pacific 2472, Spokane, Portland and Seattle 700, Southern Railway 4501, the oldest surviving 4-8-4 "Northern" type steam locomotive, Santa Fe 3751; the heaviest such locomotive built, Santa Fe 2926; and the last domestic steam locomotive Baldwin built, Chesapeake and Ohio 1309.

In Australia, five of the twenty 59 class Baldwin 2-8-2s which entered service in 1952/53 survive.

Pampanga Sugar Development Company (PASUDECO) No. 2 is in static display as the Riverland Express at Riverbanks Center mall in Marikina, Philippines as of October 2022. It is a 2-6-0 built in 1928 by Baldwin and is one of the few surviving tender locomotives in Luzon.

=== Narrow-gauge and unconventional ===
Baldwin built locomotives for narrow-gauge railways as well. Some of the more notable series built for the Denver & Rio Grande Western were outside-framed 2-8-2 "Mikados": Fifteen class K-27's, originally built as Vauclain compounds in 1903, ten class K-36's built in 1925, and ten class K-37's in 1928. Several of all these classes survive, and most are operating today on the Durango & Silverton Narrow Gauge Railroad and the Cumbres & Toltec Scenic Railroad.

New Zealand Railways (NZR) was a major customer from 1879 when it imported six T class based on the Denver & Rio Grande locomotives due to their similar rail gauge. The next was a double emergency order of six N class and six O class after a British order for similar locomotives failed to meet on-time delivery and weight limitations specified in contract. Baldwins seized on the opportunity to impress the NZR with a prompt six-month delivery of all 12 locomotives. Thereafter NZR ordered Baldwin products to complement home built locomotives, including Wb class and Wd class. Another four of the N class were purchased in 1901. The Ub class class of 22 locomotives consisting of 10 1898 flat valve and 10 1901 piston valve (Baldwins supplying all but two) proved themselves well at the turn of the 20th century with the last retiring as late as 1958. A requirement for a larger firebox version of the class ended up creating a whole new locomotive with the birth of the 4-6-2 wheel arrangement, the Pacific was born. They were classed as Q class and remained in use until 1957. Being a new type of locomotive, the Q class had their shortcomings but eventually performed well. In 1914 a later larger improved version, and last Baldwin product to be purchased by NZR was the Aa class. They lasted until 1959. Like all American locomotives produced at the time, the Baldwins had 'short' lifespans built into them but the NZR were happy to re-boiler almost their whole fleet to give them a longer life of hard work. NZR were generally happy with their Baldwin fleet. A private Railway operating in New Zealand at the time exclusively purchased Baldwin products after facing the same difficulties with British builders the NZR had. The Wellington & Manawatu Railway (1881–1909) operated small fleets of 2-8-0 (4), 2-6-2 (6), 2-8-2 (1), 4-6-0 (2) and a large 2-8-4 (1) tank locomotive. When the NZR took over the railway, its fleet was absorbed into sub-classes of those operating already in the main fleet. When NZR placed tenders for diesel locomotives in the 1950s, Baldwins applied but failed when EMD won the contract instead. Surprisingly only one NZR Baldwin product was operational, a class Wd 2-6-4 tank locomotive operated at the Ferrymead railway in Christchurch until it was taken out of service for repairs, the remains of a WMR 2-6-2 N, NZR 4-6-0 Ub, and two NZR 2-6-2 Wb tank locomotives and one Wd tank locomotive are in the early stages of restoration. Another steam locomotive that is preserved is a steam dummy, built for Sydney Tramways, in 1891, and preserved in operational condition, at Auckland's Museum of Transport & Technology.

A six-ton, 60-cm gauge 4-4-0 built for the Tacubaya Railroad in 1897 was the smallest ever built by Baldwin for commercial use.

In the late 1890s, many British builders were recovering from an engineers' strike over working hours, leaving backlogs of orders yet to be fulfilled. This prompted British railways that were in immediate need for additional motive power to turn to Baldwin and other US builders. Examples of engines built in response include three batches of 2-6-0 tender engines for the Midland Railway, Great Central Railway, and Great Northern Railway, respectively, as well as the Lyn, a 2-4-2T (tank locomotive) for the 1 ft 11.5 in (597 mm) gauge Lynton & Barnstaple Railway in England in 1898. The Cape Government Railways of South Africa also bought engines from Baldwin as a result of the strikes. Unfortunately, many of these engines were unpopular with the crews due to their designs being atypical, and many, including all of those built for the three standard gauge British railways and the Lynton and Barnstaple's Lyn, were scrapped when no longer needed. A replica of the latter locomotive has been constructed for the revived Lynton & Barnstaple Railway.

Also during the late 1890s, two 2-6-2T tank engines NA class were built for the Victorian Railways (VR). They were used as a trial on the new 2 ft 6 in (762 mm) narrow-gauge railways. Fifteen more were built by the VR. Both were scrapped.

To supply troops in France, 495 4-6-0PTs were built to the order of the British War Department in 1916/7. After the war surplus locomotives were sold, finding new uses in France, Britain and India.

In Britain examples were used on the Ashover Light Railway, Glyn Valley Tramway, Snailbeach District Railways and the Welsh Highland Railway.

The Welsh Highland Railway in Wales bought No 590, in 1923. It was apparently unpopular with crews although photographs show that it was used regularly until the railway was closed. It was scrapped in 1941 when the derelict railway's assets were requisitioned for the war effort. Some of the surviving examples in India have since been imported to the UK, one of which by the Welsh Highland Railway Ltd. who has restored it to represent the scrapped 590. Other Baldwin 4-6-0PT's imported from India include one owned by the Leighton Buzzard Light Railway based Greensand Railway Trust that has been restored to working order, as well as two acquired by the Statfold Barn Railway in March 2013.

Baldwin also built six engines for the Pikes Peak Cog Railway, three of which were delivered in 1890, with the fourth being delivered in 1897. These engines featured steeply inclined boilers and used the Abt rack system to propel them up the average 16 percent grade. The last Baldwin engine was taken out of regular service in 1955. During the following years the engines were used as back-up engines and for snow removal. Three of the engines are currently on static display around Colorado. One (No. 1) is located at the Colorado Railroad Museum in Golden, Colorado. The other two on display are located in Manitou Springs, Colorado: one (No. 2) near city hall and the other (No. 5) at the Pikes Peak Cog Railway depot. The engine No. 4 is still in limited operation for photo opportunities and special events. However, it no longer completes the journey to the top of Pikes Peak due to the fact that many of the water tanks along the line have been removed. Engines No. 3 and No. 6 were scrapped and used for parts over the years.

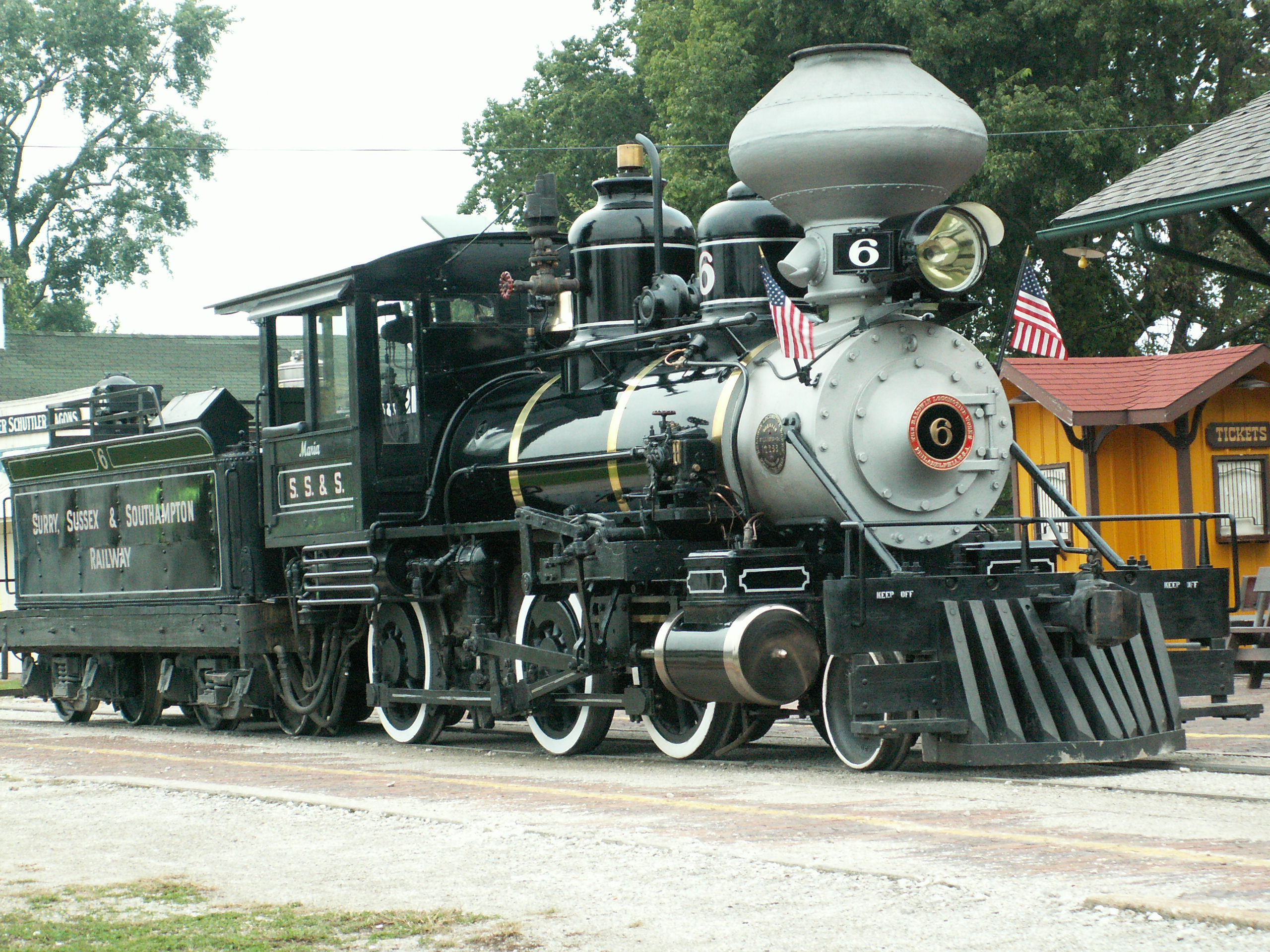
MCRR Baldwin Mogul No. 6

Number 6 (builder plate number 12288), a 36" 2-6-0 was built by Baldwin in 1891 for the Surry Sussex & Southampton Railway in Virginia. The SS&S installed Southern valve gear, a graceful outside drive gear. The 6 was eventually sold to the Argent Lumber Company in South Carolina. In 1960, the 6 was purchased by southeastern Iowa's Midwest Central Railroad as part of a package deal including the 2 (below). It was the first locomotive to operate on a regular basis at the MCRR and was their main engine until 1971 when it was taken out of service for a major overhaul. Completed in 1988, this ground up rebuild included a new boiler and conversion to oil fire. A "medium" boiler repair was started in 2009, with the work completed in September 2010, in time for the 2010 Midwest Old Thresher's Reunion.

The Midwest Central Railroad also owns Number 2, a 36" 2-6-0, which was built for the New Berlin & Winfield Railroad in 1906. The NB&W operated an 8-mile (13 km) line in Pennsylvania for an agricultural community. The two hauled freight and passengers on this small operation until the mid-1910s. In 1917, the locomotive was sold to the Argent Lumber Company in South Carolina where it worked along with the 6 in swamp trackage, hauling logs to the mill in Hardeeville. Upon arrival at the MCRR in 1960, it received substantial repairs and was put into service by the early 1970s, replacing number 6 as the MCRR's main engine. In 1987, number 2 was taken out of service for a complete rebuild which is still in progress as of January 2011.

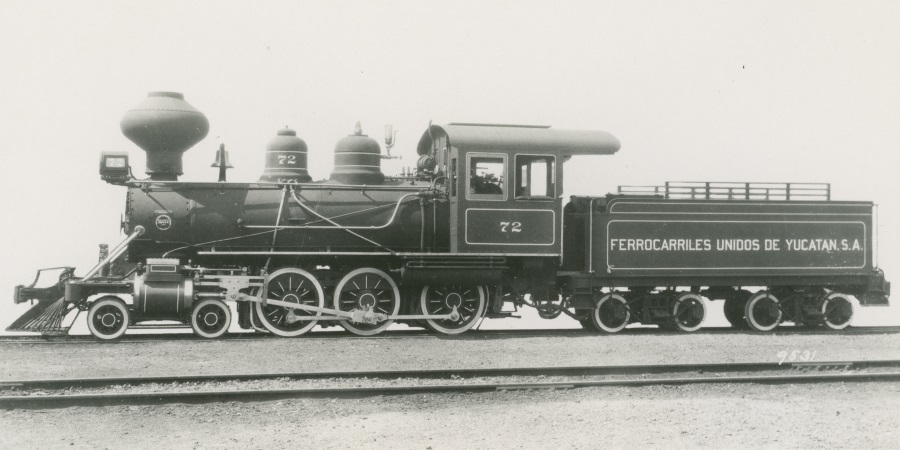
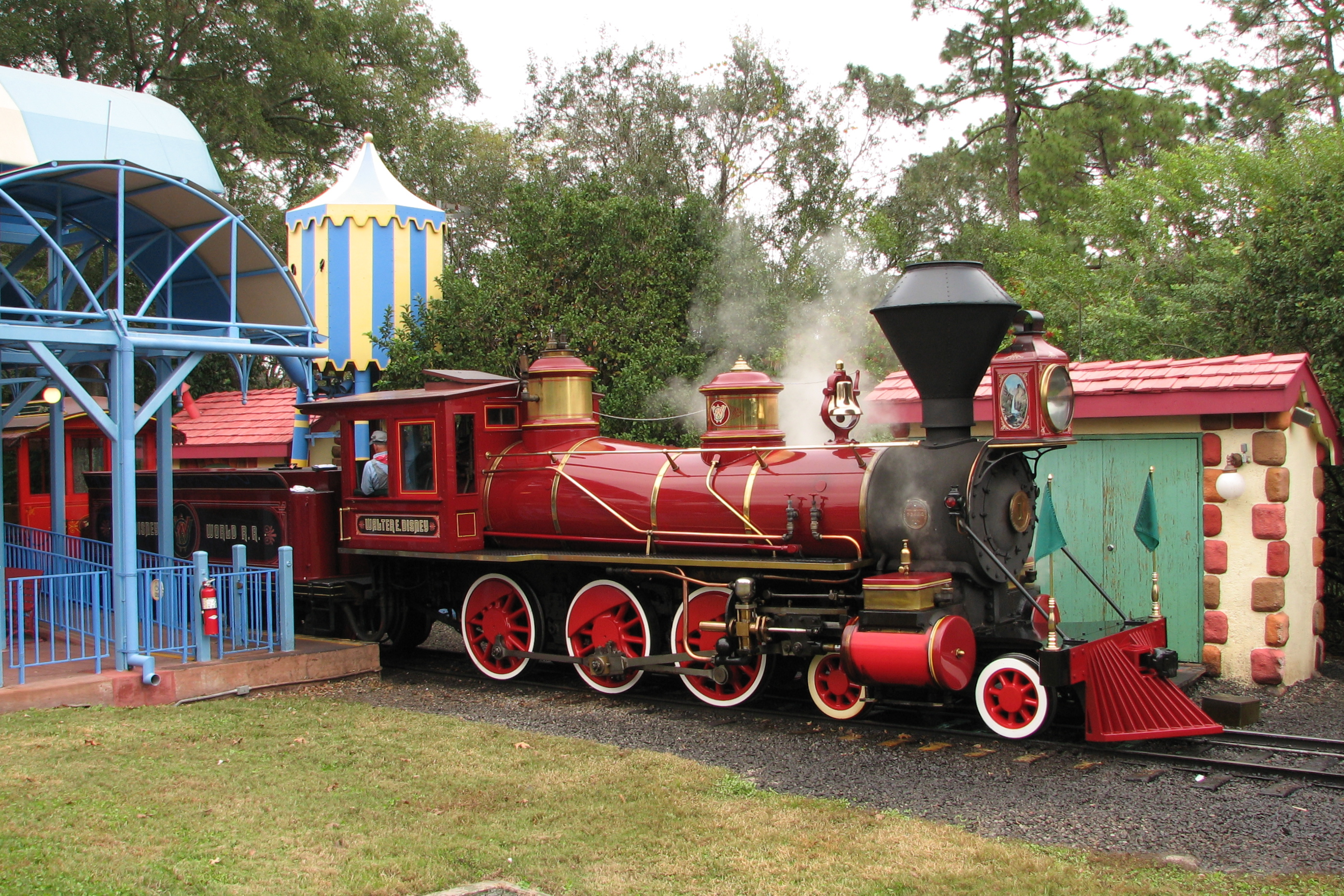
UdeY Baldwin Ten-Wheeler No. 72 (top), which now runs as WDWRR No. 1 Walter E. Disney (bottom).

The Walt Disney World Railroad (WDWRR), which runs around the Magic Kingdom in Florida, has four operational Baldwin locomotives: a 1916 Class 8-C 4-4-0 No. 4 (The Roy O. Disney), twin locomotives Nos. 1 and 3, both 1925 Class 10-D 4-6-0 designs (The Walter E. Disney and the Roger E. Broggie, respectively), and a 1928 Class 8-D 2-6-0 No. 2 (The Lilly Belle). They all originally worked on the Ferrocarriles Unidos de Yucatán (UdeY), a 3 ft (914 mm) railroad that operated in the state of Yucatán in Mexico. In the late 1960s, they were all purchased by Disney imagineers Roger Broggie and Earl Vilmer for $8,000 each and rebuilt to operating condition, while significantly altered from their original appearance to resemble steam locomotives from the 1880s. Three other operational Disney-owned Baldwin locomotives (No. 3 Fred Gurley, No. 4 Ernest S. Marsh, and No. 5 Ward Kimball) operate on the Disneyland Railroad, where they run around Disneyland in California alongside two additional locomotives built by WED Enterprises.

Baldwin also built many boilers and stationary steam engines for heating and powering buildings and industry.

=== Street railways and tramway steam motors ===
As well as railway locomotives, Baldwin built street tramway steam motors in large numbers for operators in the United States and worldwide. There were three basic models, with 9-inch, 11-inch and 13-inch motors, the sizes being determined by the cylinder size rather than the boiler capacity. These were largely superseded by electric tramcars, but some were built and operated well into the 20th century for systems that were never electrified. There were well over 100 built for the New South Wales Government Tramways in Sydney, Australia from 1879 to 1910. Mostly 11" and 0-4-0 in configuration.

Two operational NSWGT surviving steam motors:

- Baldwin 11676 of 1891 NSWGT No. 103 Valley Heights Steam Tramway, New South Wales, Australia.
- Baldwin 11665 of 1891 NSWGT No. 100 Museum of Transport & Technology, Auckland, NZ. No.100 was latterly used in Wanganui, New Zealand 1910–1950.

Other Baldwin steam motor operators included:

- The Takapuna Tramways and Ferry Company, Auckland, New Zealand 1910–1927. Route was from Bayswater to Milford via Takapuna and Lake Pupuke. No surviving locomotives.

=== Electric locomotives ===
From the early years of the 20th century Baldwin had a relationship with the Westinghouse Electric Company to build electric locomotives for the American market. The electric locomotive was increasingly popular; electrification was expensive, but for high traffic levels or mountainous terrain it could pay for itself, and in addition some cities like New York, were banning the steam locomotive because of its pollution and the propensity for accidents in smoke-choked terminals. Baldwin built or subcontracted out the bodywork and running gear, and Westinghouse built the electrical gear. Both combined to have a similar arrangement with the Netherlands N.V. Heemaf and Werkspoor for the foreign markets.

Baldwin built the famed EP-1 (1906), EF-1 (1912) and EP-2 (1923) box cab electric locomotives for the New York, New Haven & Hartford Railroad. Baldwin also delivered the EP-3 box cab electric locomotives to the Milwaukee Road for use on its line between Harlowton, Montana, and Avery, Idaho.

Baldwin built several electric locomotive types for the Pennsylvania Railroad as well including the P5A and R1 locomotives.

=== Steam-turbine locomotives ===
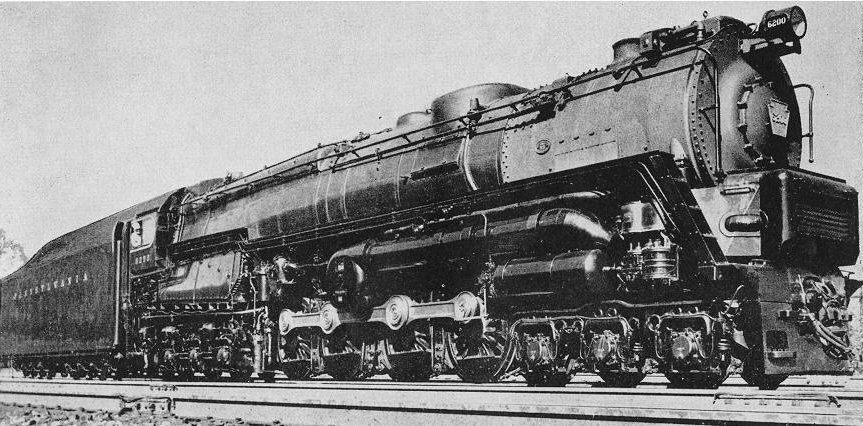
Pennsylvania Railroad class S2 #6200

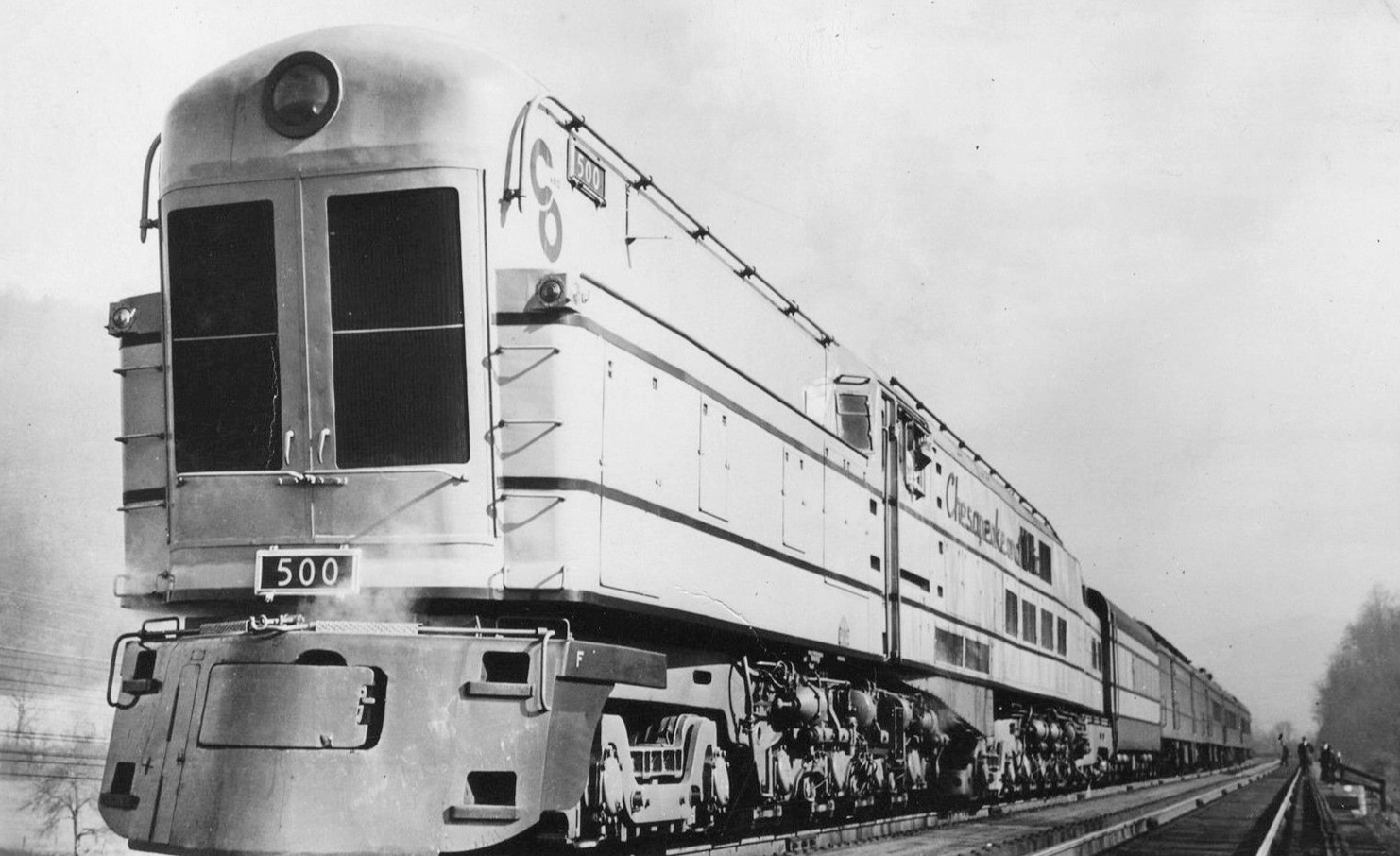
C&O class M-1 #500

In the waning years of steam Baldwin also undertook several attempts at alternative technologies to diesel power. In 1944 Baldwin outshopped an S2 class 6-8-6 steam turbine locomotive for the Pennsylvania Railroad.

Between 1947 and 1948 Baldwin built three coal-fired steam turbine-electric locomotives of a unique design, for passenger service on the Chesapeake & Ohio (C&O), who numbered them 500 to 502 and classified them M-1. The 6,000 horsepower (4,500 kW) units, which were equipped with Westinghouse electrical systems and had a 2-C1+2-C1-B wheel arrangement, were 106 feet (32 m) long, making them the longest locomotives ever built for passenger service. The cab was mounted in the center, with a coal bunker ahead of it and a backwards-mounted boiler behind it, the tender only carrying water. These locomotives were intended for a route from Washington, D.C., to Cincinnati, but could never travel the whole route without some sort of failure. Coal dust and water frequently got into the traction motors. These problems could have been fixed given time, but it was obvious that these locomotives would always be expensive to maintain, and all three were scrapped in 1950.

In May 1954 Baldwin built a 4,500 horsepower (3,400 kW) steam turbine-electric locomotive for freight service on the Norfolk & Western (N&W), nicknamed the "Jawn Henry" after the legend of John Henry, a steel-driver on a track crew who famously raced against a steam drill and won, only to die immediately afterwards. The unit was similar in appearance to the C&O turbines but very different mechanically; it had a C+C-C+C wheel arrangement, and an improved watertube boiler which was fitted with automatic controls. Unfortunately the boiler controls were sometimes problematic, and, as with the C&O turbines, coal dust and water got into the motors. "Jawn Henry" was retired from the N&W roster on January 4, 1958.

=== Diesel-electric locomotives ===
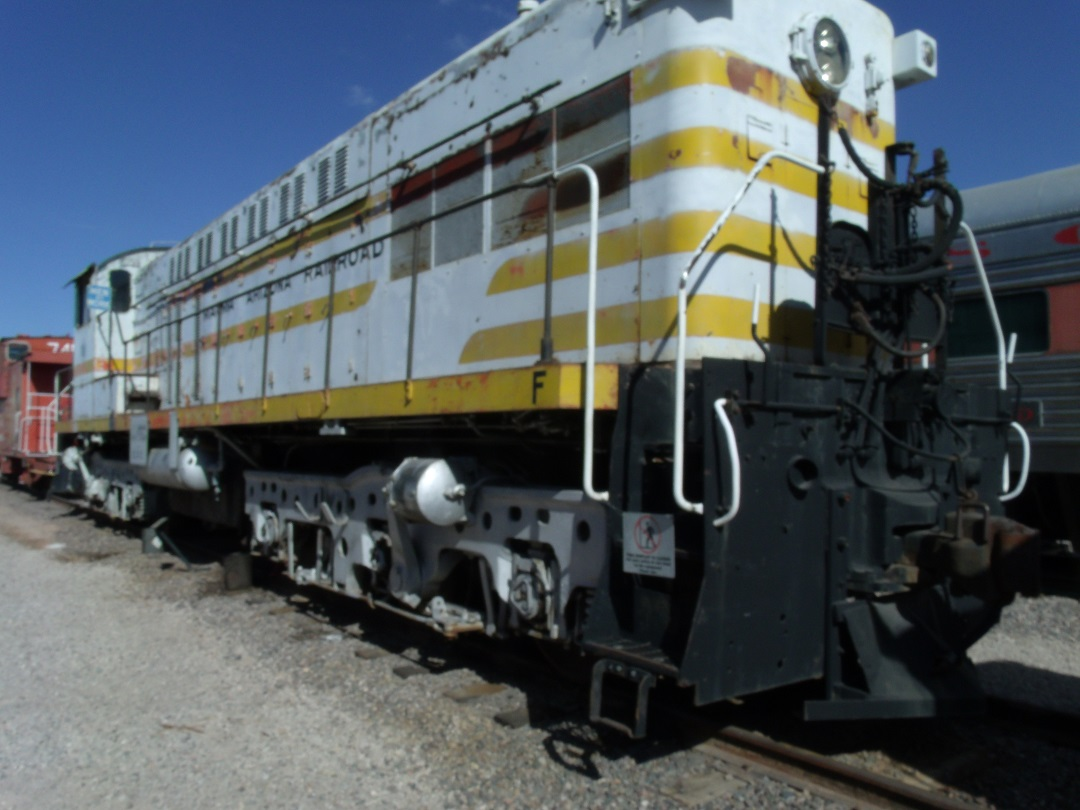
Magma Arizona Railroad Baldwin #10. The Baldwin Locomotive Works built this locomotive in 1950 as a DRS 6-6-1500, diesel for the McCloud River Railroad as #29.

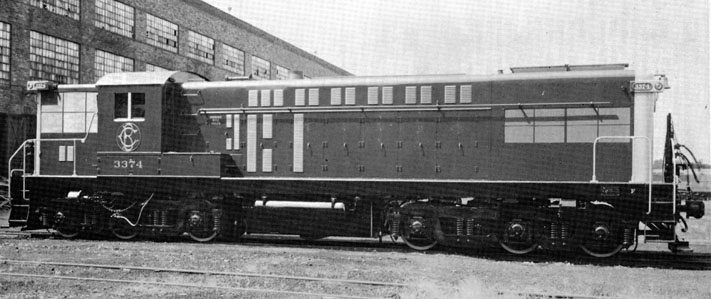
Brazilian AS616 class

Though fairly successful in the marketplace, Baldwin diesels did not do so well as others. Thanks to their robust Westinghouse electrical gear, they were excellent haulers, but the diesel prime movers were less reliable than comparable EMD and Alco products. The company remained fond of steam power and was slow to make the jump to building reliable diesel road locomotives. By the late 1940s, Baldwin's main diesel competitors – Alco, EMD and Fairbanks-Morse – had each settled on four or five standard locomotive models, which were suitable for assembly-line construction. Baldwin, meanwhile, was the sole manufacturer to continue the steam-era practice of offering bespoke locomotive designs at the request of individual railroads. This resulted in a large number of diesel models, most of which had a small number of units (aside from switcher locomotives, only a few models had more than 50 examples). This put Baldwin at a competitive disadvantage since it was unable to benefit from economies of scale, consistent quality control, or the evolution of each model, which its competitors enjoyed. Even the construction could vary between units of the same model, especially if they were not built in sequence. The last Baldwin-Lima-Hamilton diesels were delivered in 1956.

=== Gas turbine-electric locomotives ===
In April 1950, Baldwin and Westinghouse completed an experimental 4,000 hp (3,000 kW) gas turbine locomotive, numbered 4000, known as the "Blue Goose", with a B-B-B-B wheel arrangement. The locomotive used two 2,000 hp (1,500 kW) turbine engines fueled by Bunker C fuel oil, was equipped for passenger train heating with a steam generator that utilized the waste exhaust heat of the right hand turbine, and was geared for 100 miles per hour (160 km/h). While it was demonstrated successfully in both freight and passenger service on the PRR, MKT, and CNW, no production orders followed, and it was scrapped in 1953.

== See also ==
- Category:Baldwin locomotives
- List of Baldwin diesel locomotives
- Samuel M. Vauclain Designer and railway pioneer
- Vauclain compound
- Whitcomb Locomotive Works

== Bibliography ==
- Alexander, E.P. (2003), Iron Horses: American Locomotives 1829–1900, Courier Dover Publications, ISBN 0-486-42531-2
- Best, Gerald M. (1968), Mexican Narrow Gauge, Howell-North Books.
- Brown, John K. (1995), The Baldwin Locomotive Works, 1831–1915: A Study in American Industrial Practice, Studies in Industry and Society series, Baltimore, Maryland, USA: Johns Hopkins University Press, ISBN 978-0-8018-5047-9.
- Churella, Albert J. (1998). From Steam to Diesel: Managerial Customs and Organizational Capabilities in the Twentieth-Century American Locomotive Industry. Princeton, New Jersey: Princeton University Press. ISBN 978-0-691-02776-0.
- Cotterell, Paul (1984), The Railways of Palestine and Israel, Abingdon: Tourret Publishing, ISBN 0-905878-04-3.
- Leaphart, David (2016). Walt Disney World Railroads Part 3: Yucatan Jewels (1st ed.). Steel Wheel on Steel Rail Studio. ISBN 978-1-533-03707-7.
- Marx, Thomas G. (1976), "Technological Change and the Theory of the Firm: The American Locomotive Industry, 1920–1955", Business History Review, 50 (1): 5–18, doi:10.2307/3113572, JSTOR 3113572, S2CID 154642921.
- Pinkepank, Jerry A. (1973), The Second Diesel Spotter's Guide, Milwaukee, Wis.: Kalmbach Publishing Co., ISBN 0-89024-026-4
- Sloan, Alfred P. (1964), McDonald, John (ed.), My Years with General Motors, Garden City, NY, US: Doubleday, LCCN 64011306, OCLC 802024. Republished in 1990 with a new introduction by Peter Drucker (ISBN 978-0385042352).
- Warner, Paul Theodore (1924), Motive Power Development on the Pennsylvania Railroad System, 1831–1924, Pennsylvania Railroad Company.
- Westing, Frederick (1982) [1966], The locomotives that Baldwin built. Containing a complete facsimile of the original "History of the Baldwin Locomotive Works, 1831–1923, Crown Publishing Group, ISBN 978-0-517-36167-2, LCCN 66025422
