= Baldwin 4-8+8-4-750/8-DE =

Road diesel locomotive built by Baldwin Locomotive Works in 1943

Baldwin 4-8+8-4-750/8DE1
Type and origin
- Power type: Diesel-electric
- Builder: Baldwin Locomotive Works
- Serial number: BLW 64639, also 4-8+8-4-750/8DE1
- Model: 4-8+8-4-750/8DE1
- Build date: May 1943
- Total produced: 1
Specifications
- Configuration
  - AAR: 2-D+D-2
  - UIC: (2′Do)+(Do2′)
- Gauge: 4 ft 8 1/2 in (1,435 mm)
- Wheel diameter: 40 in (1,000 mm)
- Length: 91 ft 6 in (27.89 m)
- Loco weight: 685,000 pounds (311,000 kg)
- Fuel capacity: 2,850 US gal (10,800 L; 2,370 imp gal)
- Prime mover: Eight 8LV (but only four installed)
- RPM range: 1050 maximum
- Engine type: Four-stroke diesel
- Aspiration: Supercharger
- Generator: Westinghouse YG37B
- Traction motors: Westinghouse 370A (8)
- Cylinders: V8 (×8 planned)
- Transmission: Electric
- Gear ratio: 25:54
- Loco brake: Straight air
- Train brakes: Air
- Couplers: AAR Type E knuckle
Performance figures
- Maximum speed: 120 mph (190 km/h)
- Power output: 6,000 hp (4.47 MW) (with all 8 engines installed)
- Tractive effort: 45,000 lbf (200.17 kN) at 39 mph (63 km/h)
Career
- Locale: North America

The Baldwin 4-8+8-4 750/8DE1 was the Baldwin Locomotive Works' first attempt at building a road diesel locomotive. The trucks were configured in a 2-D+D-2 wheel arrangement. Only a single test unit was built.

In 1943 Baldwin built an experimental "Centipede" as a demonstrator unit, which was assigned road #6000. The uniquely styled unit, with its upright, aggressive prow, was to be powered with eight model 408-series V8 8LV diesel engines (which would have produced 6,000 horsepower (4,500 kW)), though only four were actually installed. The locomotive's running gear design reflected Baldwin steam and electric locomotive practice. The carbody rode on two massive articulated cast steel half-frames cast by General Steel Castings, linked at the middle with a hinged joint. Unpowered four-wheel trucks at each end guided the locomotive through curves for stability at speed.

The locomotive utilized unique "power packages", each consisting of an engine, generator, radiator, electrical cabinet, and other auxiliaries. These power packages could be changed out in as little as 20 minutes. While the locomotive was designed to carry 8 of these power packages, only 4 were ever installed. Each engine powered a single axle of the locomotive.

The lone unit was tested on the Pennsylvania Railroad, Baltimore and Ohio, and Reading, but dismantled soon after production, and its running gear was used for the one of a kind prototype #4500 Seaboard Air Line 3,000 horsepower (2,200 kW) "Centipede".
