= Baldwin VO-1000 =

Diesel-electric locomotive

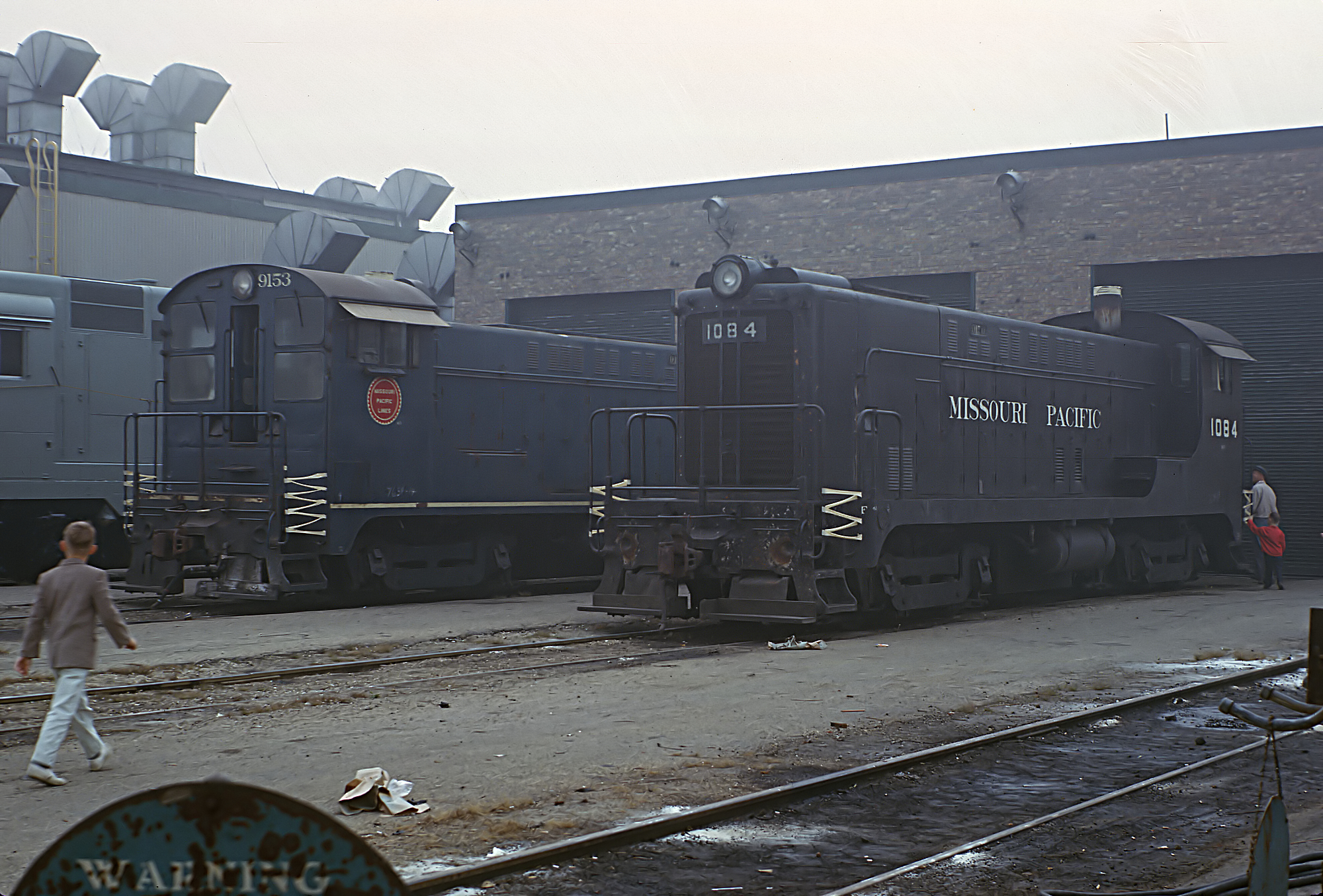
- Baldwin VO-1000s from the Missouri Pacific Railroad in LaGrange, Illinois on October 6, 1962
Type and origin
- Power type: Diesel-electric
- Builder: Baldwin Locomotive Works
- Model: VO-1000
- Build date: January 1939 – December 1946
- Total produced: 548
Specifications
- Configuration
  - AAR: B-B
  - UIC: Bo′Bo′
- Gauge: 4 ft 8 1/2 in (1,435 mm) standard gauge
- Length: 48 ft 0 in (14.63 m)
- Loco weight: 236,260–242,200 lb (107,165.7–109,860.1 kg)
- Prime mover: De La Vergne 8-VO
- Engine type: Straight-8 Four-stroke diesel
- Aspiration: Naturally aspirated, solid injection
- Displacement: 1,979 cu in (32.43 L) per cylinder 15,831 cu in (259.42 L) total
- Generator: DC generator
- Traction motors: DC traction motors
- Cylinders: 8
- Cylinder size: 12 3/4 in × 15 1/2 in (324 mm × 394 mm)
- Transmission: Electric
- Loco brake: Straight air
- Train brakes: Air
Performance figures
- Power output: 1,000 hp (746 kW)
- Tractive effort: 59,065–60,550 lbf (262.7–269.3 kN)
Career
- Locale: North America
- Disposition: 10 Preserved, remainder scrapped

The Baldwin VO-1000 is a diesel-electric switcher locomotive built by the Baldwin Locomotive Works between January 1939 and December 1946. These units were powered by a naturally aspirated eight-cylinder diesel engine rated at 1,000 horsepower (746 kW), and rode on a pair of two-axle trucks in a B-B wheel arrangement. These were either the AAR Type-A switcher trucks, or the Batz truck originally developed by the Atchison, Topeka and Santa Fe Railway as a leading truck for steam locomotives. 548 examples of this model were built for American railroads, including examples for the Army and Navy.

Between June and August 1945 Baldwin supplied 30 Co-Co road locomotives with 8-cylinder VO engines for export to the Soviet Union as their Дб20 (Db20) class. In 1947-48, Baldwin uses the VO-1000 design to create the A1A-A1A 62000 (Baldwin DRS-6-4-660NA) for the French national railways.

There are at least eight intact examples of the VO-1000 that are known to survive today, most of which are owned by museums or historical societies. However, a VO-1000m is owned by the Northwestern Pacific Railroad, a local freight carrier based in Schellville, California.

== Conversions ==
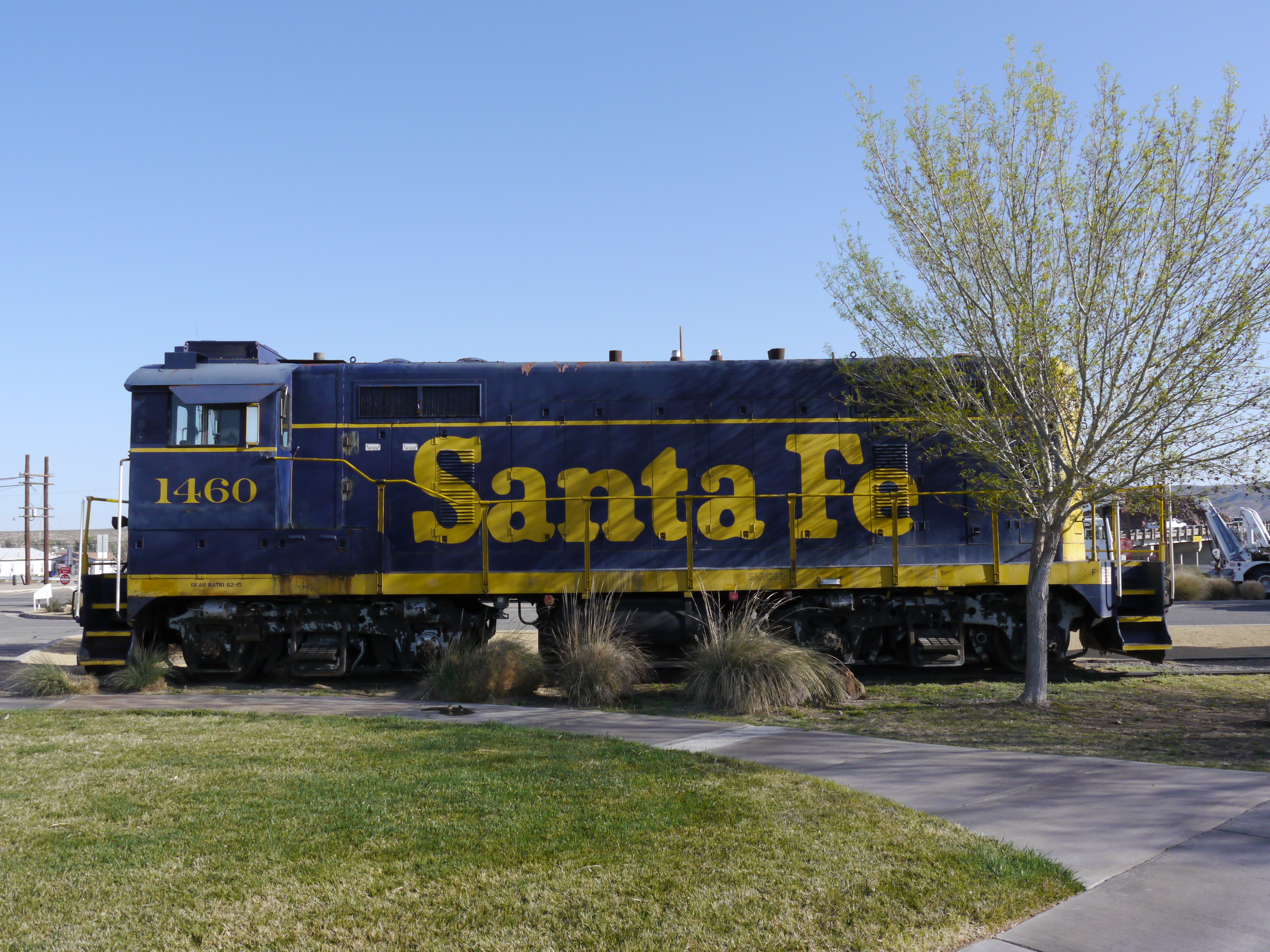
"Beep" at the Western America Railroad Museum in 2012.

In the early 1960s the Reading Company sent 14 of their VO-1000s to General Motors Electro-Motive Division to have them rebuilt to SW900 specifications. These locomotives retained most of their original carbodies, and were subsequently given the designation VO-1000m.

Around the same time, the Elgin, Joliet and Eastern Railway repowered its VO1000s with turbocharged 606SC Baldwin engines taken from its EMD-repowered fleet of Baldwin DT-6-6-2000 locomotives. The work was performed at EJ&E's Joliet, Illinois workshops, and produced a finished unit that featured an offset exhaust stack and left-side turbocharger bulge, the latter being much like that found on Baldwin road switchers. The Atlantic Coast Line Railroad had eight of their VO1000s repowered with EMD 567 series engines, which produced 1,200 hp (890 kW). The Great Northern Railway converted four VO-1000s into transfer cabooses in 1964. The units were stripped to their bare frames (the original trucks and distinctive cast steps were left in place) and fitted with 15-foot (4.6 m)-long steel cabins.

The St. Louis – San Francisco Railway repowered theirs with EMD 567C prime movers in the late 50's and early 60's. The conversion lead to extended use into the late 70's. Most units were retired in 1979, though some were sold off.

In December 1970 the Atchison, Topeka and Santa Fe Railway (soon after its successful CF7 capital rebuilding program) produced a unique switcher locomotive, known to railfans as the "Beep", at its Cleburne, Texas service facility. The company hoped to determine whether or not remanufacturing its aging, non-EMD end cab switchers by fitting them with new EMD prime movers was economically prudent. The conversion proved too costly, and only the one unit was modified.

== Original owners ==
Image	Railroad	Quantity	Road numbers	Notes
	Baldwin Locomotive Works (demonstrators)	2	307, 332	to Spokane, Portland and Seattle Railway 30–31
	Baldwin Locomotive Works (demonstrators)	1	333	to Central of Georgia Railway 22
	Baldwin Locomotive Works (demonstrators)	1	334	to Minneapolis and St. Louis D-340
	American Steel and Wire Company	1	12	
	Atchison, Topeka and Santa Fe Railway	59	2201–2259	
	Atlantic Coast Line Railroad	9	606–609, 616, 617, 619, 621, 623	Renumbered 10–18
	Baltimore and Ohio Railroad	25	413–437	Renumbered 9200–9224 at random
	Belt Railway of Chicago	2	401–402	
	Canton Railroad	2	30–31	to Patapsco & Back Rivers 331–332
	Central of Georgia Railway	2	26, 27	
	Central Railroad of New Jersey	5	1062–1066	
	Chicago, Burlington and Quincy Railroad	30	9350–9379	
	Chicago, Milwaukee, St. Paul and Pacific Railroad (“Milwaukee Road”)	12	1680–1691	Renumbered 928–939
	Chicago, Rock Island and Pacific Railroad	5	760–764	
	Chicago, St. Paul, Minneapolis and Omaha Railway (“Omaha Road”)	3	87–89	Re-engined by EMD in 1958
	Chicago and North Western Railway	12	1024, 1037–1047	
	Colorado and Wyoming Railway	3	1107–1109	#1107 to WRRC
	Chicago Short Line Railway	3	100–102	
	Defense Plant Corporation (Carbon County Railway)	2	262-1, 262-2	to Columbia-Geneva Steel Division, US Steel #36–37
	Detroit Terminal Railroad	2	101–102	
	Elgin, Joliet and Eastern Railway	10	475–484	
	Escanaba and Lake Superior Railroad	1	100	
	Great Northern Railway	10	5332–5335, 139–144	5332–5335 Renumbered 132–138
	Iowa Ordnance Plant	1	1-120	to US War Department 7275
	Kennecott Copper Corporation (Bingham and Garfield Railway)	2	801, 803	
	Kentucky and Indiana Terminal	4	44–47	
	Lehigh Valley Railroad	5	135–139	
	Litchfield and Madison Railway	1	100	to C&NW #86; rebuilt by EMD
	Louisville and Nashville Railroad	9	2202–2210	
	Macon, Dublin and Savannah Railroad	1	1000	to SAL 1492; to SCL 84
	Minneapolis and St. Louis Railway	1	D-145	Renumbered 103
	Minneapolis, St. Paul and Sault Ste. Marie Railroad	1	310	
	Missouri Pacific Railroad	6	9103, 9117–9119, 9198, 9199	
	Missouri Pacific Railroad (International-Great Northern Railroad)	3	9150–9152	
	Missouri Pacific Railroad (St. Louis, Brownsville and Mexico Railway)	5	9153–9155, 9160, 9161	
	Nashville, Chattanooga and St. Louis Railway	6	15, 30–34	
	New York Central Railroad	8	8600–8607	renumbered 9300–9307
	Northern Pacific Railway	28	108–109, 111–112, 119–124, 153–154, 159–174	Renumbered 400–427 (not in order)
	Oliver Iron Mining Company	15	907–915, 918, 919, 922	
	Patapsco and Back Rivers Railroad	4	70–73	Renumbered 326–329
	Pennsylvania Railroad	8	5913–5920	
	Phelps Dodge Corporation	2	9, 10	
	Philadelphia, Bethlehem and New England Railroad	2	251, 252	to Patapsco & Back Rivers 328, 330
	Pittsburgh and West Virginia Railway	1	30	to Patapsco & Back Rivers 355
	Reading Company	24	55–59, 71–89	
	St. Louis-San Francisco Railway (“Frisco”)	38	200–237	Repowered with EMD 567 prime mover
	St. Louis Southwestern Railway (“Cotton Belt”)	23	1000–1022	1007 to Texas South-Eastern
	Seaboard Air Line Railroad	7	1400–1402, 1413–1416	to Seaboard Coast Line 28–30; 37–40
	Southern Pacific Company	25	1320–1329, 1371–1385	
	Southern Railway	1	DS-2205	later renumbered 2205, with no "DS" prefix
	Spokane, Portland and Seattle Railway	5	30-34	
	Tennessee Coal, Iron and Railroad Company	4	800–803	
	Tennessee Eastman Corporation	1	4	
	Terminal Railroad Association of St. Louis	11	591–601	
	Union Pacific Railroad	6	1055–1060	
	Union Railroad	6	500–505	500,501,505 to Patapsco & Back Rivers Railway; 502 to Universal Iron & Steel; 505 to URR Tack & Maintenance 504; 503=?
	United States Navy	40	‘1-120’, 1 (Thrice), 2, 3 (Thrice), 4 (Twice), 5 (Twice), 6-7, 8-10 (Twice), 11, 12 (Twice), 13 (Thrice), 14 (Twice), 15-16, 18-19 (Twice), 21-23, 35-38	Multiple Reporting Marks, Varied by location
	United States Department of War	26	7126–7130, 7137–7140, 7143, 7225–7227, 7453–7457, 7461–7464, V-1800 to 1801	Same Reporting Mark (USAX?)
	Wabash Railroad	4	300–303	
	Western Maryland Railway	5	128–132	
	Western Pacific Railroad	5	581–585	
	Western Railway of Alabama	4	621–624	
	Total	548		

== Surviving examples ==
One VO-1000 is set to undergo restoration to active service on SMS Rail Lines in New Jersey: Texas Southeastern #1007 (ex-SSW 1007).

In addition, several VO1000s survive in preservation:

- Bingham & Garfield #801 is preserved as Nevada Northern #801 and is operational at the Nevada Northern Railway in Ely, Nevada.
- Colorado and Wyoming Railway #1107 is preserved at the Museum of the American Railroad in Dallas, Texas. It was previously in service on the Western Rail Road in Dittlinger, Texas.
- Patapsco & Back Rivers #331 is preserved as Canton Railroad #32 at the National Museum of Railroad History & Innovation in Baltimore, Maryland.
- US Air Force 7467 is preserved at the Tennessee Valley Railroad Museum in Chattanooga, Tennessee. It spent its service life at Arnold AFB in Tullahoma, Tennessee and has been cosmetically restored to its mid 1960’s appearance.
- US Army #8 is preserved as OERM #8 at the Southern California Railway Museum in Perris, California.
- US Navy #9 is preserved as NKP #99 is displayed at Forest Park in Noblesville, Indiana.
- US Navy #19 is preserved as Baltimore & Ohio #412 at the United Railroad Historical Society in Boonton, New Jersey.
- Western Maryland #132 is preserved at the Hagerstown Roundhouse Museum in Hagerstown, Maryland.

=== Rebuilds ===
In 1970, the Atchison, Topeka, and Santa Fe (ATSF) repowered VO-1000 #2220 with an EMD 567BC prime mover and fabricated a new hood at its Cleburne, Texas shop complex. It was renumbered to ATSF #1460, which came to be known as the "Beep." Only one unit of this experimental class was rebuilt. #1460 was retired by BNSF in 2008 and donated to the Western America Railroad Museum in Barstow, California.

In the late 1950s, the St. Louis San Francisco (Frisco) repowered some of its VO-1000s with EMD 567C prime movers under custom fabricated hoods styled to match the EMD SW1200. Two of these "VO1000M" rebuilds survive:

- SLSF #200 is operational at the Tennessee Valley Railroad Museum in Chattanooga, Tennessee.
- SLSF #206 is preserved as US Army #4648 at the Oklahoma Railway Museum in Oklahoma City, Oklahoma.
