= Chambersburg, Greencastle and Waynesboro Street Railway =

Railroad in Pennsylvania, US

Chambersburg, Greencastle & Waynesboro Street Railway
Overview
- Locale: Chambersburg, Pennsylvania and Waynesboro, Pennsylvania
- Dates of operation: 1903–1932

Technical
- Track gauge: 5 ft 2 1/2 in (1,588 mm)

The Chambersburg, Greencastle and Waynesboro Street Railway, now defunct, was an American railroad of south central Pennsylvania built in the 19th and 20th centuries.

== Origins ==
Tracks were first laid in Greencastle in 1903, with operations beginning in December along Baltimore Street and Carlisle Street. The line was extended to Shady Grove by 1906 and Chambersburg in 1908. A line from Waynesboro met the Greencastle line at Shady Grove. The Waynesboro line was extended to Pen Mar and Blue Ridge Summit. The Pen Mar line was noted for its steep grades and sharp curves.

The CG&W met the Hagerstown Railway, later the Hagerstown & Frederick Railway (H&F) at Shady Grove next to the current post office. Since the H&F was 4 ft 8 1/2 in (1,435 mm) standard gauge, there could be no exchange of equipment. "Union Station" was the junction of the Greencastle and Waynesboro trolley lines and the Hagerstown line in Shady Grove. The Hagerstown line approached Shady Grove from the south and ended along the east side of the building which is now the Shady Grove post office where it met the Greencastle and Waynesboro lines. The "Union Station" ticket office and building was a small white building right beside and on the east side of the Hagerstown tracks. The CG&W was bought by the H&F on November 30, 1917, for $1,300,000.

Because of the broad gauge, it could not carry rail freight, so it was denied a revenue source available to standard gauge systems. Service on most of the system ended on July 31, 1928. The Rouzerville-Chambersburg section finally ended service on January 13, 1932, a victim of the Depression and the automobile.

== Gauge ==
The CG&W used a 5 ft 2 1/2 in (1,588 mm) broad gauge, similar to other Pennsylvania interurban lines.

== See also ==
- Chambersburg and Gettysburg Electric Railway
- Chambersburg and Shippensburg Railway
- Cumberland Railway (Pennsylvania)
