= Cumberland Railway =

Cumberland Railway may refer to:

- Cumberland Railway and Coal Company and associated Cumberland Railway (Nova Scotia)
- Cumberland Railway (1882), predecessor of the Southern Railway in Kentucky
- Cumberland Railway (1902), predecessor of the Southern Railway in Kentucky and Tennessee
- Cumberland Railway (Pennsylvania), an interurban trolley line in central Pennsylvania
- Cumberland railway line, Sydney, Australia
