= Hagerstown and Frederick Railway =

Defunct American railway

Hagerstown & Frederick Railway
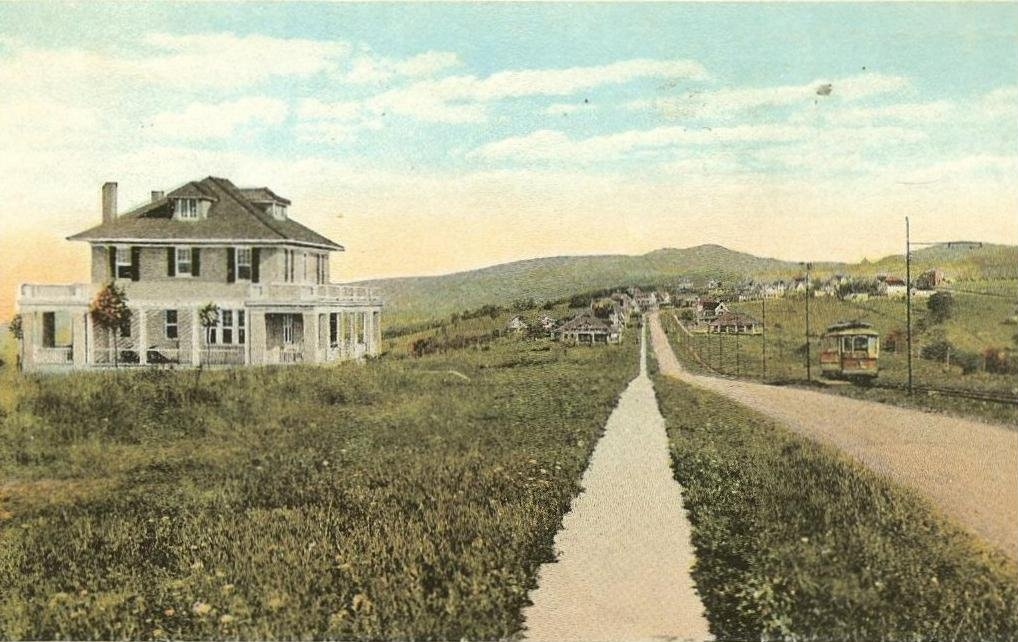
- Jefferson Boulevard in Braddock Heights, Maryland with a H&F trolley

Overview
- Fleet: Locomotives: 1; Cars: 155 (45 passenger, 105 freight)
- Parent company: Potomac Edison Company
- Headquarters: Frederick, Maryland, U.S.
- Key people: Emory L. Coblentz
- Locale: Frederick and Hagerstown, Maryland
- Dates of operation: 1896–1961
- Successors: Thurmont Trolley Trail

Technical
- Track gauge: 4 ft 8 1/2 in (1,435 mm) standard gauge
- Electrification: Overhead wire
- Track length: 90 miles (140 km)

The Hagerstown and Frederick Railway was a suburban and urban trolley (and later interurban) company built in central Maryland from 1896 to 1961. As part of its business, the railway operated two trolley parks and spurred off Allegheny Energy (later FirstEnergy), an electric utility company.

== History ==
=== Frederick and Middletown Railway ===
The Frederick and Middletown Railway was developed by George William Smith. Land was acquired in late 1895, and construction began early in 1896, almost simultaneously with the development of Braddock Heights Park, the mountaintop resort that was intended to provide patronage for the line. Service between Frederick and Braddock Heights commenced on August 22, 1896. The line was complete to Middletown by October 21.

Two years later an extension was built to Myersville, nominally called the Myersville and Catoctin Railway, but leased to the F&M and operated as an integral part of the F&M. In 1904, the Hagerstown Railway built a connecting link from Boonsboro to Myersville, and through service between Frederick and Hagerstown became possible, making the still separate lines an interurban. Travel between Frederick and Hagerstown was reduced from two days to two hours.

The Jefferson branch was added in 1906, running down the east side of Jefferson Boulevard. This extension served the H&F investors, who were largely the same as the Braddock Heights investors, by opening up more mountaintop resort land for development. An extension of this branch planned in 1907 would have taken the line to the Baltimore and Ohio Railroad yard facilities in Brunswick; the town even paid for right of way and a section of track installed in the center of its main street, however, the line was never completed.

=== Hagerstown Railway ===
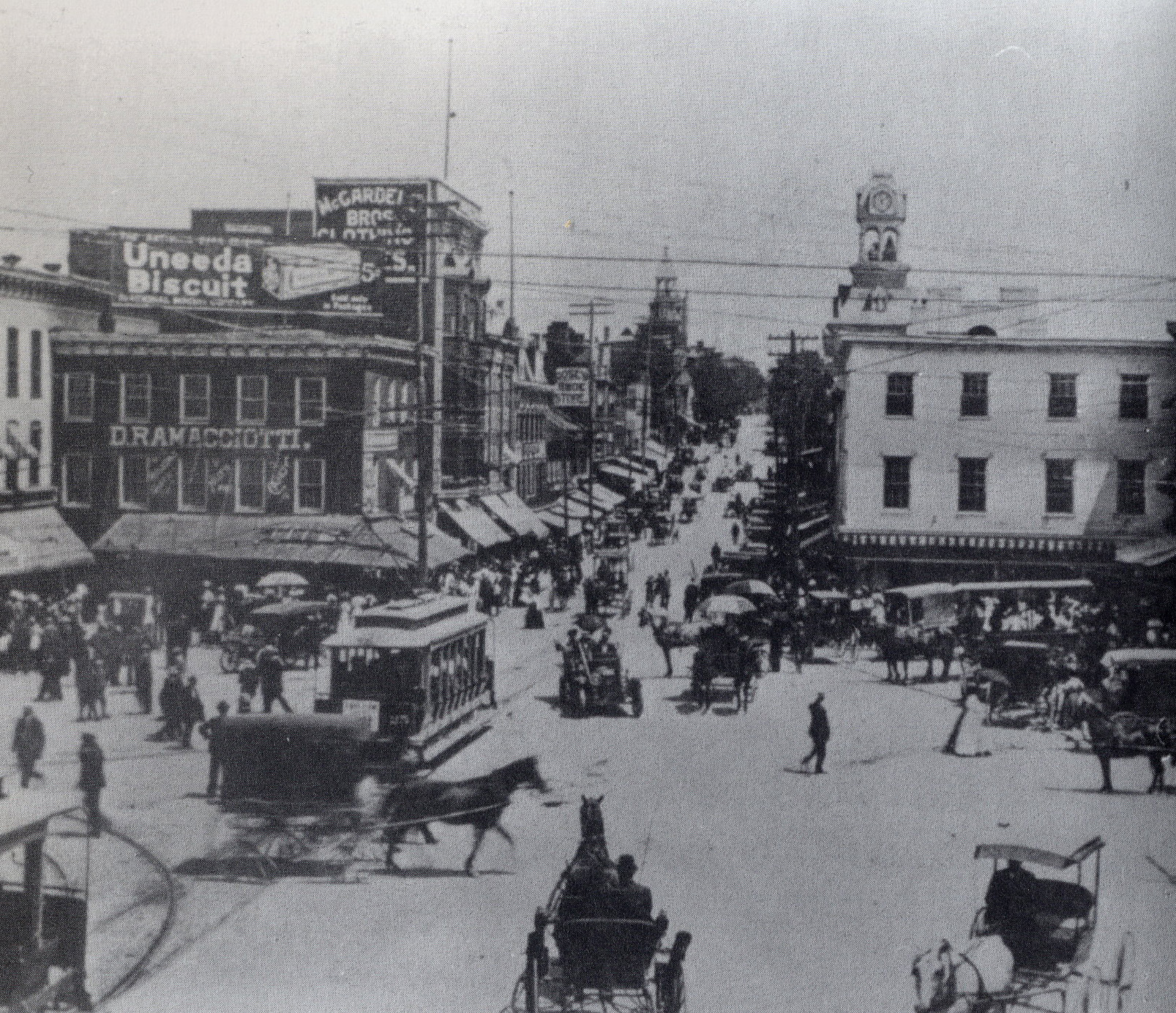
Trolley at Hagerstown Public Square c. 1900

The leading investors for the Hagerstown Railway were Christian W. Lynch, William Jennings, and John A. Herman, who took a different approach to development by creating inner-city trolley service within Hagerstown, which included an urban loop and crossing lines on Washington Street and South Potomac Street. On March 12, 1896, a charter was granted to the Hagerstown Railway. In May, railway officials were awarded the contract to construct the railway. It started operations along the line to Williamsport on August 8, followed by the Potomac Street line on August 29, and the loop and Washington Street lines on September 5. The extension of the Potomac Street line to Funkstown was completed by 1897, reaching Funkstown proper in November 1901.

Original rolling stock were six motor cars from the New Castle Car Manufacturing Company and the three trail and motor cars from the Martinsburg Street Railway in Martinsburg, West Virginia, which were bought for $900 on April 2, 1896. They were delivered two days later along the Cumberland Valley Railroad at a top speed of 4.5 miles per hour (7.2 km/h), the motor cars were pulled and the trail cars rode on gondolas.

In 1901, work began on an extension east to Wagner's Crossroads (later Boonsboro Junction) and from there south to Boonsboro itself. This section was completed in 1902. Work began immediately on the connection from Wagner's Crossroads to Myersville.

In 1905, a new line was started, running 11 miles (18 km) north from Hagerstown to Shady Grove, Pennsylvania. This permitted a connection to the Chambersburg, Greencastle and Waynesboro Street Railway. The line opened on October 10, 1906, passengers could then take the CG&W on to the mountaintop resorts of Pen Mar and Blue Ridge Summit. Incompatible rail gauges prevented direct transfer.

=== Growth and consolidation ===
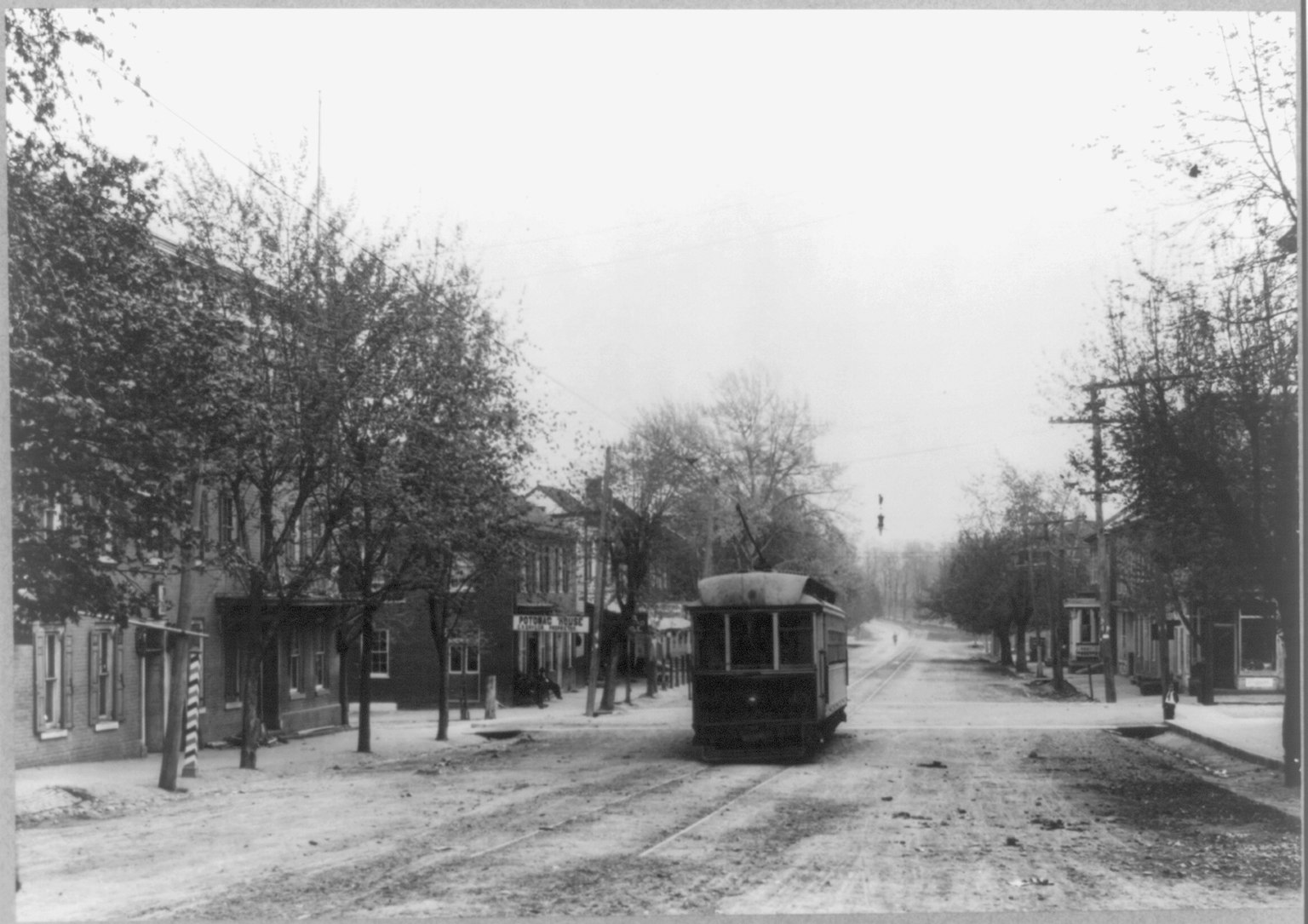
Hagerstown Railway trolley passing Potomac House (1906)

Emory L. Coblentz, a Middletown lawyer and stockholder in the F&M, took over the management of the F&M in 1908. He bought the Washington, Frederick & Gettysburg Railroad, which ran from Frederick to Thurmont, and incorporated it into the F&M in December 1909, renaming the F&M as the Frederick Railroad. During the next two years the network in Frederick was expanded and its facilities improved, with lines on Fifth Street, South Street and Market Street. On April 7, 1913, ten public utility companies (including the Hagerstown Railway and the Frederick Railroad) merged, becoming the Hagerstown & Frederick Railway. (Note: However, the Poor's Manual states that the merger took place on March 22, 1913, with the company's organization taking place on April 7, 1913.)

In 1915, a 7-mile (11 km) extension for H&F's Thurmont line was proposed, bringing the line to Emmitsburg. Further proposals brought the line to Gettysburg, Pennsylvania. On November 30, 1917, the H&F received ownership of Chambersburg, Greencastle and Waynesboro Street Railway (an over 30-mile (48 km) railway) for $1,300,000.

=== Trolley parks ===
Braddock Heights Park c. 1910

In common with many more urban trolley systems, the H&F owned and operated two amusement parks, both as business ventures in their own right, and as traffic generators for the trolley business. In pre-air conditioning days, mountaintop parks like Braddock Heights Park (which was racially-segregated) were popular summer getaways where city dwellers could entertain themselves and breathe cool mountain air. The Electric Park in Funkstown served much of the same function.

=== Potomac Edison ===
The Hagerstown & Frederick had always run what originally amounted to a side business, selling electricity to customers in the vicinity of its operations. As time went on, it became apparent to Emory Coblentz that the real business opportunity was in the electric utility business. With an eye to expanding his utility market, Coblentz purchased the Martinsburg Electric Light Company on August 1, 1916. He also acquired the Northern Virginia Power Company, and in 1917 the Chambersburg, Greencastle & Waynesboro Street Railway, which came with its own utility service. In 1922 the entire system, including the Hagerstown & Frederick Railway, became the Potomac Public Service Company. The next year, the PPS absorbed the Cumberland utility known as the Potomac Edison Company (which included the Cumberland and Westernport Electric Railway), and applied its name to the entire operation. Potomac Edison thus covered a territory covering western and central Maryland, the Eastern Panhandle of West Virginia, and a portion of Northern Virginia.

Immediately thereafter, in another consolidation, Potomac Edison became a subsidiary of a holding company, the American Water Works & Electric Company, which operated a group of companies in the Allegheny-Ohio Valley region under the West Penn Electric Company brand. The Potomac Edison name carried on until the 1990s when the Allegheny Power brand was applied.

=== Competition and decline ===
Jefferson Blvd and paralleling streetcar tracks in Braddock Heights, Maryland, pre-1923

By the 1920s the H&F faced competition from two sources: the automobile and the Blue Ridge Transportation Company, a bus company owned by Potomac Edison. A gradual decline set in 1927, starting with the end of Electric Park and the closure of the Washington Street line in Hagerstown in August of the same year. In August 1929, the loop line on Mulberry Street was replaced with busses and in the same month the Braddock Hotel burned and was not replaced.

The Great Depression made things worse. The Chambersburg, Greencastle and Waynesboro Street Railway shut down on January 16, 1932, and the Shady Grove line followed suit, closing on August 21, 1932. Emory Coblentz was caught in the financial collapse of his bank, and was indicted (and later acquitted) on fraud charges. Having resigned from Potomac Edison and lost everything, he died in 1941, effectively destitute.

The reconstruction of US Route 40 in 1936 to better suit the automobile took another toll. The new US 40 alignment between Myersville and Hagerstown crossed the H&F right-of-way at several points. Rather than build level crossings, the line was abandoned on October 7, 1938. Streetcar service in Frederick had already been terminated since July 30, 1937, and in Hagerstown since March 5, 1939.

=== End of the line ===
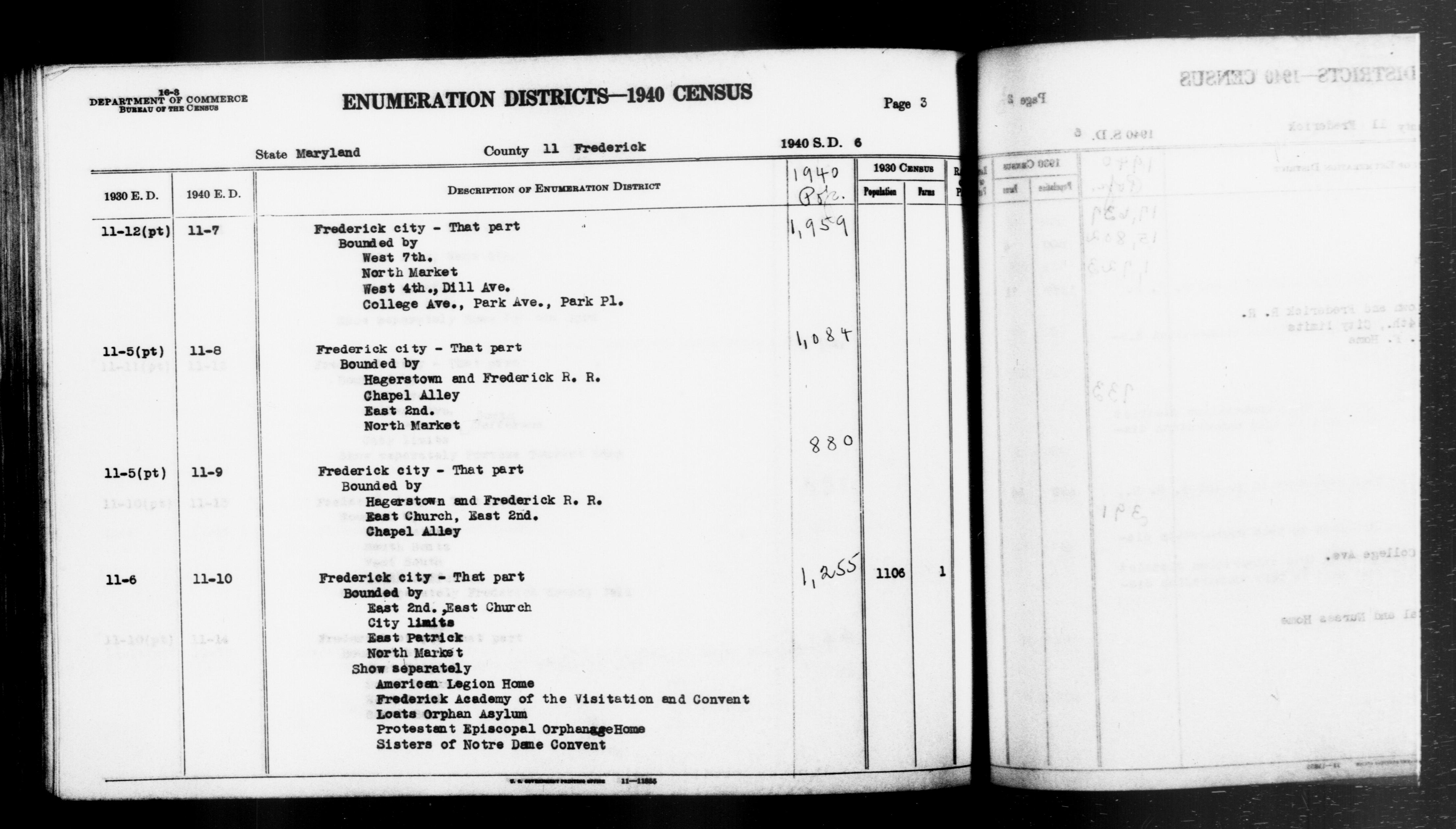
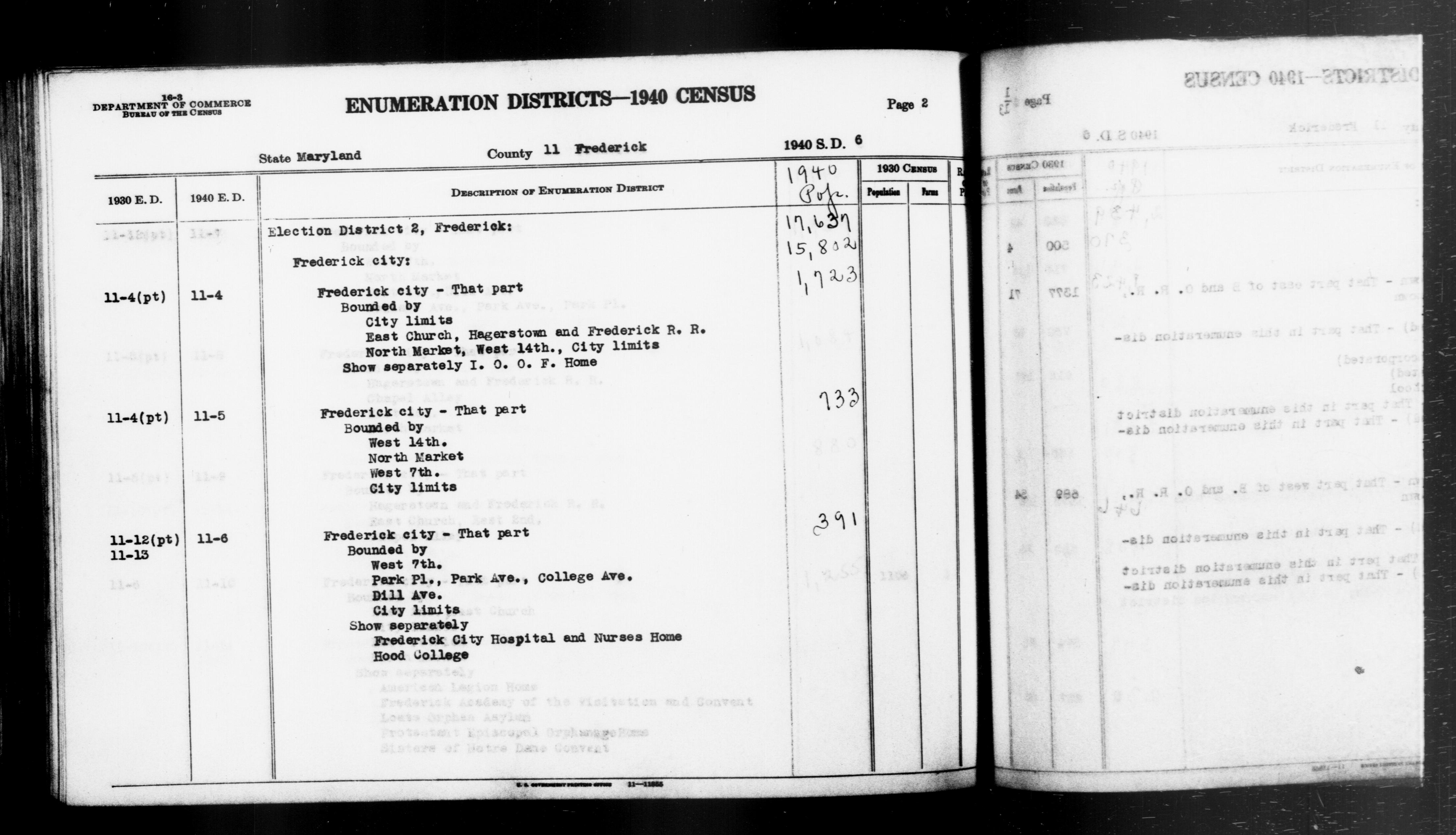
Frederick's enumeration district from 1940 bounded by the H&F Railway

Passenger service to Jefferson halted in February 1940, and tracks were removed in 1943, although the line along Jefferson Boulevard to Dean's was kept in operation to cater to the resort trade in Braddock Heights at the Vindobona Hotel. The Middletown-Myersville section was closed and the track was lifted on January 2, 1945.

The Hagerstown-Williamsport line closed in August 4, 1947, the last service in Washington County. On September 30, 1947, service was discontinued on the Middletown and Braddock Heights lines. Most freight on the Thurmont branch was gone, with only service to Fort Detrick as a significant contributor. The network in Frederick was kept busy switching freight between industrial sidings and connections between the Baltimore and Ohio Railroad (B&O) and Pennsylvania Railroad (PRR) lines. In November 1948, the track along Patrick Street became obsolete when Frederick made their streets one-way.

Many utilities, including Potomac Edison, were ordered by the Securities and Exchange Commission to leave non-utility-related businesses, such as transportation. With that incentive, the last H&F trolley ran to Thurmont on February 20, 1954. Freight carried on, but the electric lines were removed on the Thurmont line in 1955 and diesel equipment was substituted. Nevertheless in 1958, the track between Thurmont and Fort Detrick was taken up. Potomac Edison stopped all service on April 26, 1961.

== Lines ==
Route	Miles	Major Stops
Braddock Heights to Jefferson	5 mi (8.0 km)	Braddock Junction, Braddock Heights, Deans, Jefferson
Fredrick City Lines	2 mi (3.2 km)	Frederick, Maryland
Frederick to Thurmont	17.3 mi (27.8 km)	Frederick, Yellow Springs, Bethel, Lewistown, Catoctin Furnace, Thurmont
Frederick to Schleysville	1 mi (1.6 km)	Frederick
Hagerstown City Lines	6.05 mi (9.74 km)	Hagerstown, Maryland, Hagerstown Fairgrounds
Hagerstown to Frederick	30.34 mi (48.83 km)	Hagerstown, Myersville, Middletown, Braddock Junction, Boonsboro, (Note: Served by a branch line) Frederick
Hagerstown to Shady Grove	11.2 mi (18.0 km)	Hagerstown, Reid, Shady Grove, Pennsylvania
Hagerstown to Williamsport	6.15 mi (9.90 km)	Hagerstown, Williamsport

== Remnants ==
=== Landmarks ===
The 1910 H&F Frederick Terminal and Offices in Frederick at 200 East Patrick Street survives as the former headquarters of the Frederick News-Post. The exit for trolleys onto Patrick Street is still visible as the main entrance.

Braddock Heights station long did duty as a store, post office, station and electrical substation.

The Boonsboro H&F Station is the Boonsboro Trolley Museum and opens to the public once a month.

The former H&F Powerhouse and later Carbarn for Hagerstown still stands at the intersection of Summit and Lee Streets in that city.

Myersville's station on Main Street gained a second story and new roof, becoming an apartment building. The adjacent former fright warehouse became a public park.

=== Trolleys ===
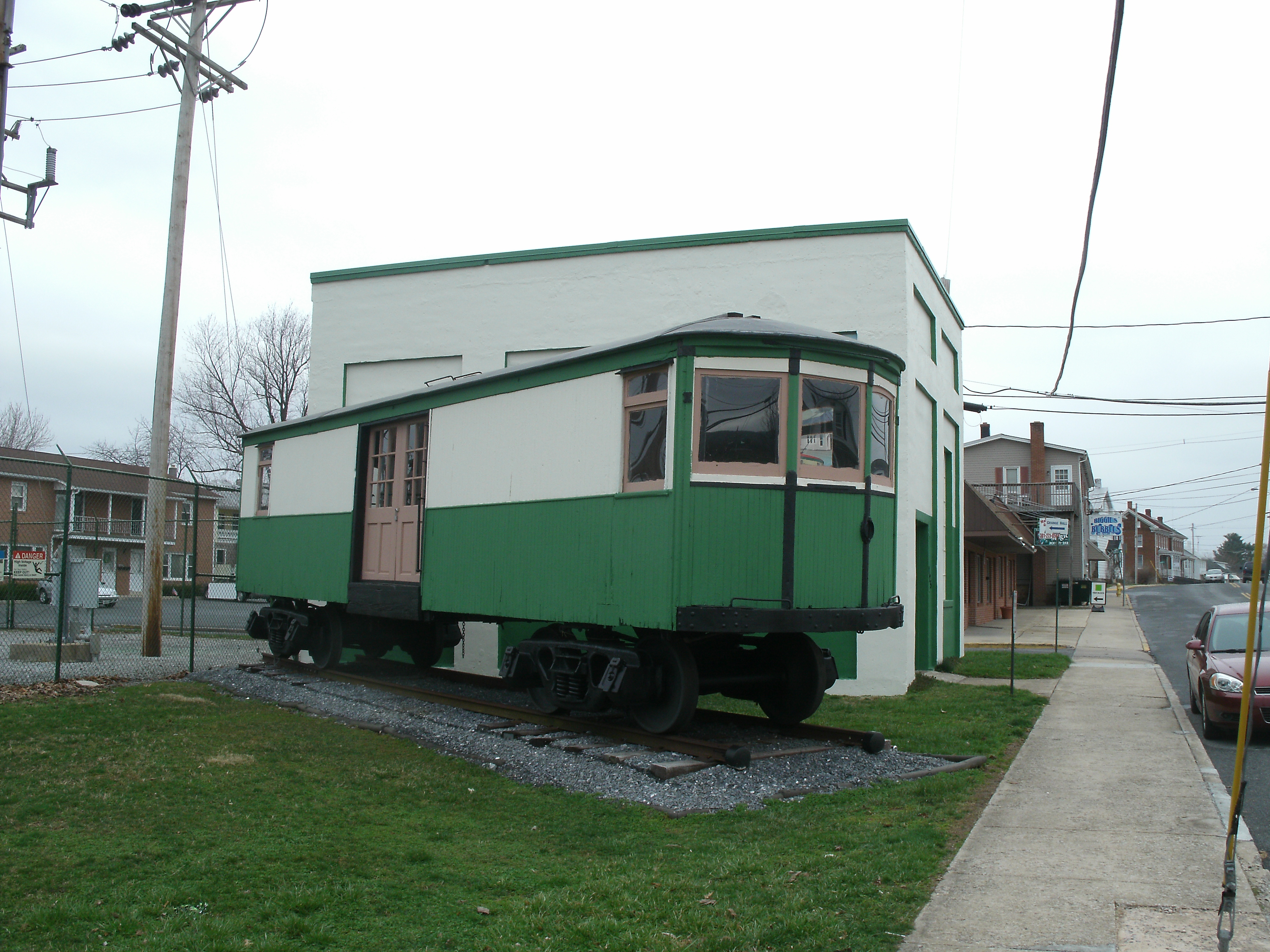
Freight Motor #5 in Thurmont

Four "Trolleys" are extant:

- Freight Motor #5 is displayed at the former site of the H&F Thurmont Station along Main Street.
- Suburban Coach #150 was privately owned in Catoctin Mountain and Myersville, and was the centerpoint of the Myersville Trolley Festival. It is now owned by the Town of Myersville and is on display in the new public library.
- Interurban Combine #168 is displayed outside of the Hagerstown Roundhouse Museum.
- Interurban Combine #171 is used as a private residence between Frederick and Thurmont.

=== Right of way ===
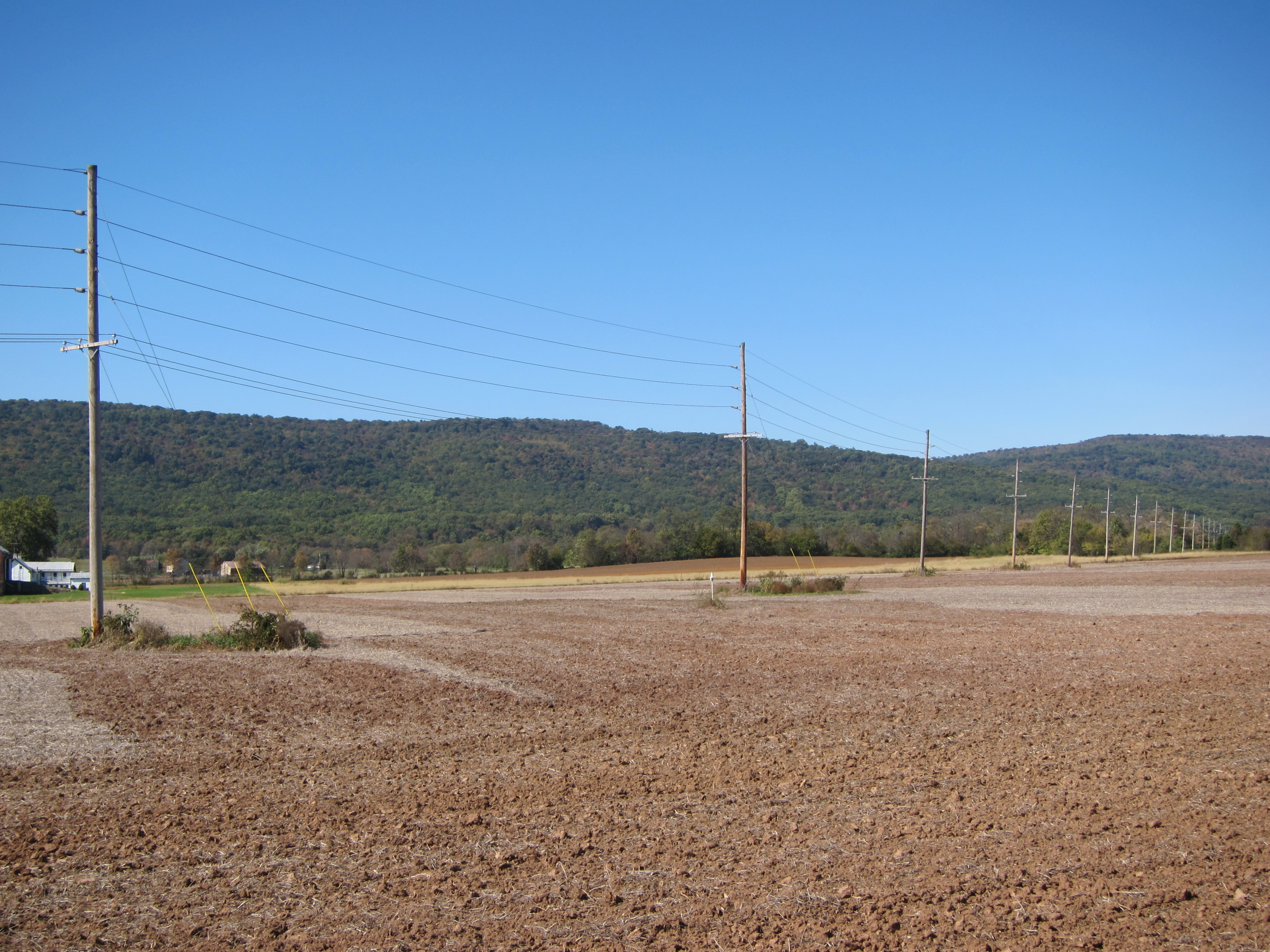
Power lines on the former right of way near Lewistown

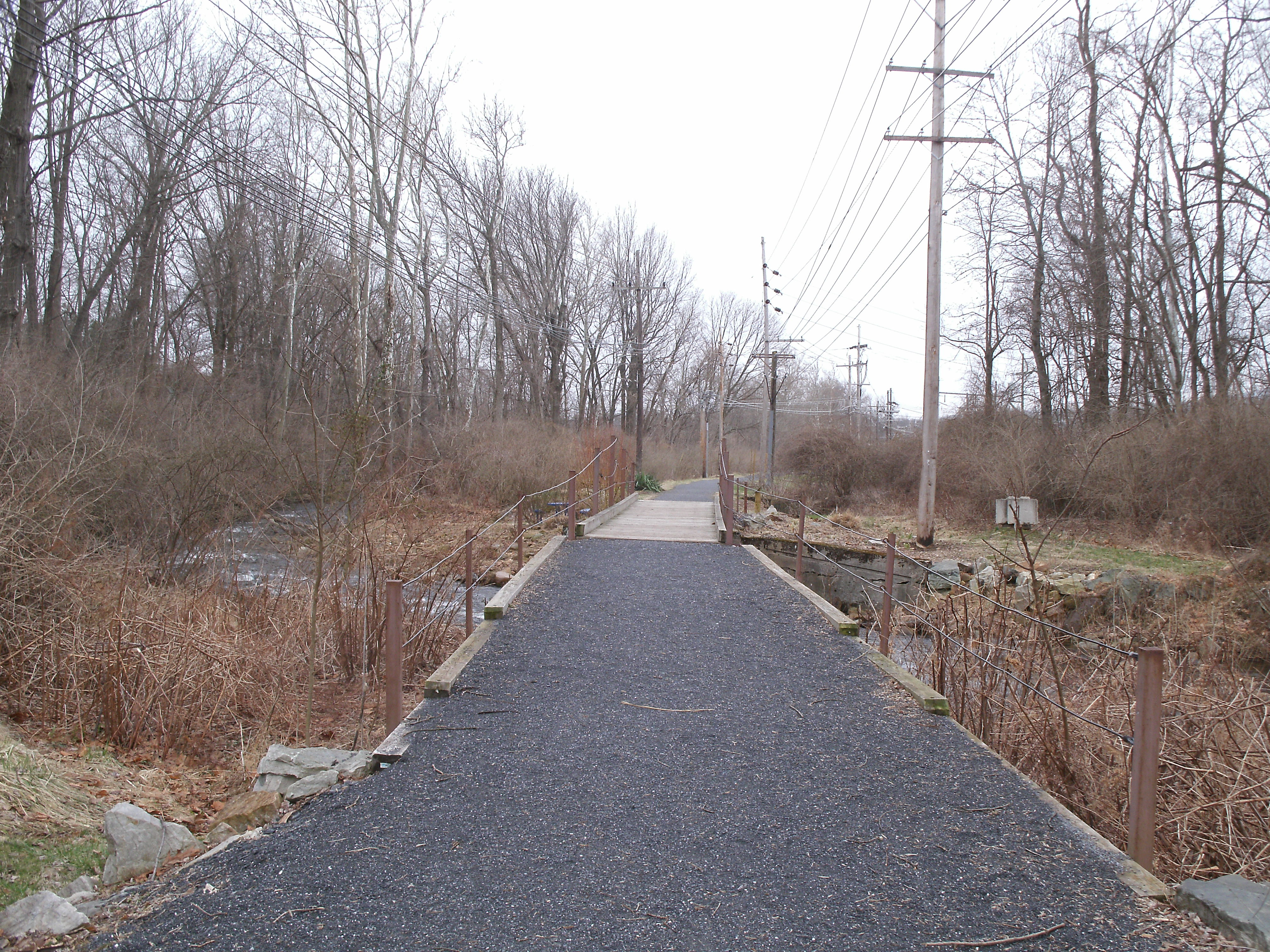
The Thurmont Trolley Trail in 2014

Traces of the old right of way are still visible where sidewalks have been set back from the street:

- Frederick - Along Rosemont Avenue from Culler Avenue to Hood College
- Braddock Heights - Along Maryland Avenue and Jefferson Boulveard
- Middletown - Along Main Street from Broad Street to Pine Road
- Funkstown - Baltimore Street from Stauffer Avenue to Sturgis Drive and Frederick Street's west side
- Beaver Creek - From Cool Hollow Road to Mapleville Road
- Boonsboro - Along Main Street from Park Lane to Mapleville Road
- Bethel - Opposumtown Pike next to Bethel Lutheran Church

Some bridge abutments survive at creek crossings, and traces of old embankments remain visible in undeveloped areas. In some cases, Allegheny Energy feeders still use the right-of-way.

==== Hagerstown and Frederick Trail ====
A rails to trails linear park had been proposed along the old H&F line between Frederick and Thurmont. A short portion of the line in Thurmont has been developed by the community in 2007, ending across Main Street from the site where the H&F Station once stood. A non-profit organization was formed in 2017 to promote this proposal.

== Preservation and culture ==
=== Hagerstown & Frederick Railway Historical Society ===
A Historical Society was formed in 1999 to preserve artifacts and documents from and educate the public about the history of the Hagerstown & Frederick Railway.

=== Myersville Trolley Festival ===
The town of Myersville celebrates the H&F at an annual festival. The festival was founded in 1993 when Don Easterday purchased and refurbished trolley car #150, which was the centerpiece of the festival. It was discontinued in 2012 due to Easterday's health; he died in 2016. After his death, the city took over the car and the associated trolley shelter. The festival was brought back at Doub’s Meadow Park on October 5, 2024.

== See also ==
- List of Maryland railroads
- Airview Historic District
- Boonsboro Historic District
