= Santa Fe SD26 =

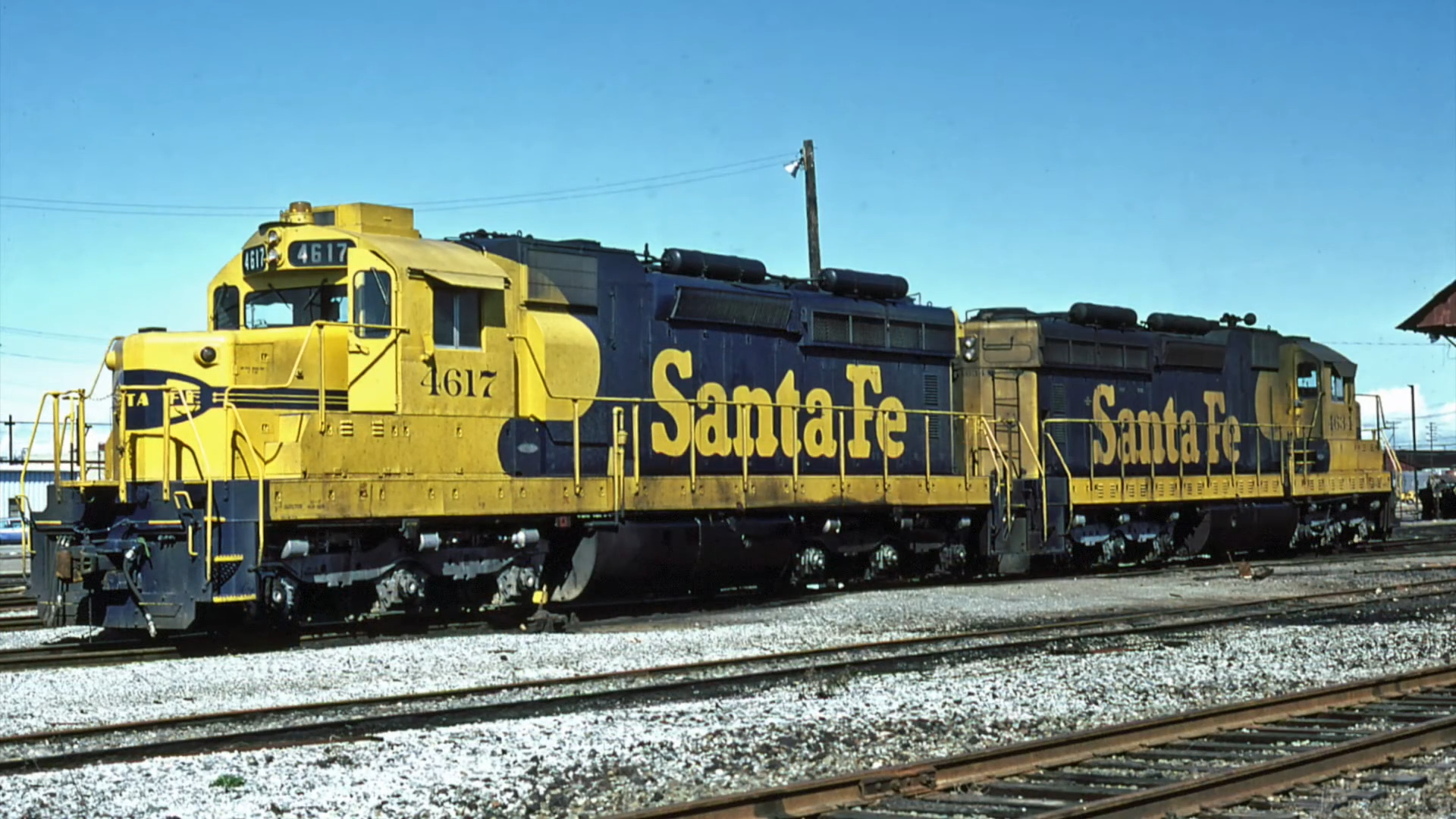
- Two back-to-back ATSF SD26s (4617 and 4634) on February 19, 1979.
Type and origin
- Power type: Diesel-electric
- Builder: General Motors Electro-Motive Division (EMD)
- Model: SD26
- Total produced: 80
- Rebuilder: ATSF's San Bernardino shops
- Rebuild date: January 1973 — January 1978
Specifications
- Configuration
  - AAR: C-C
- Gauge: 4 ft 8 1/2 in (1,435 mm) standard gauge
- Length: 60 ft 8.5 in (18.50 m)
- Loco weight: 328,000 lb (149,000 kg)
- Prime mover: EMD 16-567D3 with 16-645 power assemblies
- Engine type: V16 2-stroke diesel
- Aspiration: Turbocharger
- Displacement: 169.1 in^{3} (2.771 L)
- Generator: DC
- Traction motors: DC
- Cylinders: 16
- Cylinder size: 9.1 in × 10 in (231 mm × 254 mm)
- Transmission: diesel-electric
- Loco brake: Straight air / Dynamic
- Train brakes: XR Air
Performance figures
- Maximum speed: 89 mph (143 km/h)
- Power output: 2,625 hp (1,957 kW)
- Tractive effort: 82,000 lbf (360 kN)
Career
- Operators: Atchison, Topeka and Santa Fe Railway, Guilford Rail System
- Locale: North America
- Retired: c. 2012
- Disposition: All scrapped

The Santa Fe SD26 were EMD SD24 diesel locomotives rebuilt by the Atchison, Topeka and Santa Fe Railway between January 1973 and January 1978. In an effort to spare the cost of purchasing new motive power, the Santa Fe elected to expand on the success of its CF7 and other capital rebuild programs and extend the life of its fleet of 80 aging SD24s by rebuilding them at its San Bernardino, California Shops.

The rebuilt locomotives saw service throughout much of the Santa Fe system. One unit, the 4625, was wrecked in August 1974 shortly after rebuild. Another 44 units were retired by Santa Fe in 1985 and replaced with state-of-the-art equipment, while a year later the remaining 35 units were sold to Guilford Rail System (now Pan Am Railways). As of 2012, all SD26s have been presumed scrapped.

== History ==
=== Development ===
The first locomotive to go through the rebuild program was Santa Fe #4533, which entered the San Bernardino shops in January 1973.

Its four roof-mounted "torpedo tube" air reservoir tanks were moved to allow for the installation of a new inertial air filtering system (SD24s lacked a central air filtration system), which was located directly behind the locomotive cab. The resulting "blower bulge" or "hump" became the most obvious visual identifier of the SD26. Two of the air tanks were reinstalled toward the back roof on either side of the radiator section fans, while the other pair was situated on either side of the dynamic brake fans.

The original EMD 16-567D3 engine was rebuilt with 645 power assemblies. Coupled with extensive electrical system upgrades, the horsepower rating was increased to 2,625 and gave rise to the 26 designation. The SD24's unreliable electrical system was replaced with upgraded circuitry, consisting of new wiring harnesses and EMD's new "Dash 2" circuit cards. The unit was retrofitted with extended-range dynamic brakes as well.

The footboards were reconfigured, the locomotive bell was removed from the front pilot and mounted midway between the radiator fans and dynamic brake fans, and a roof-mounted beacon and cab air conditioning system was installed. The unit retained its one-piece windshield and nose-mounted classification lights. When all of the modifications were complete, the locomotive was given a fresh coat of Yellowbonnet paint and reassigned as #4633 (all SD26s were given a 100-place "bump" in numbering to reflect their new class).

Over the next five years, all of the Santa Fe's remaining SD24s would undergo similar modifications.

=== Subsequent alterations ===
In the early 1980s, most of the stock one-piece windshields were replaced with two-piece units similar to those used on the EMD GP20, a move intended to bring standardization of windshield glass to several classes of Santa Fe locomotives and thereby reduce maintenance stockpiles. A "second generation"-style traction motor blower housing was fitted to the left side of later rebuilds.

Ten of the units (#4601, #4603–#4607, #4612, #4617, #4618, and #4675) were wired to operate with "slug" units for work in the Kansas City and Barstow hump yards and flat yards throughout the system. Ten others (#4611, #4627, #4629, #4640, #4645, #4648, #4667, #4674, #4677, and #4678) were configured with Locotrol Remote Control Equipment (RCE) for use in coal, grain, potash, and molten sulfur unit train service.

=== In service ===
The majority of SD26s were placed in both general freight and intermodal service in the Kansas City — La Junta — Albuquerque — El Paso freight pool, while others spent their years running up and down the railroad's Coast Lines. The units became known as "slushbuckets" among railfans in reference to their distinctive turbocharger sound, which was considerably more subdued than that produced by either the GP40 or SD40. #4625 was wrecked near Rustler Springs, Texas in August 1974 and was subsequently sent to the scrap yard.

=== Afterlife ===
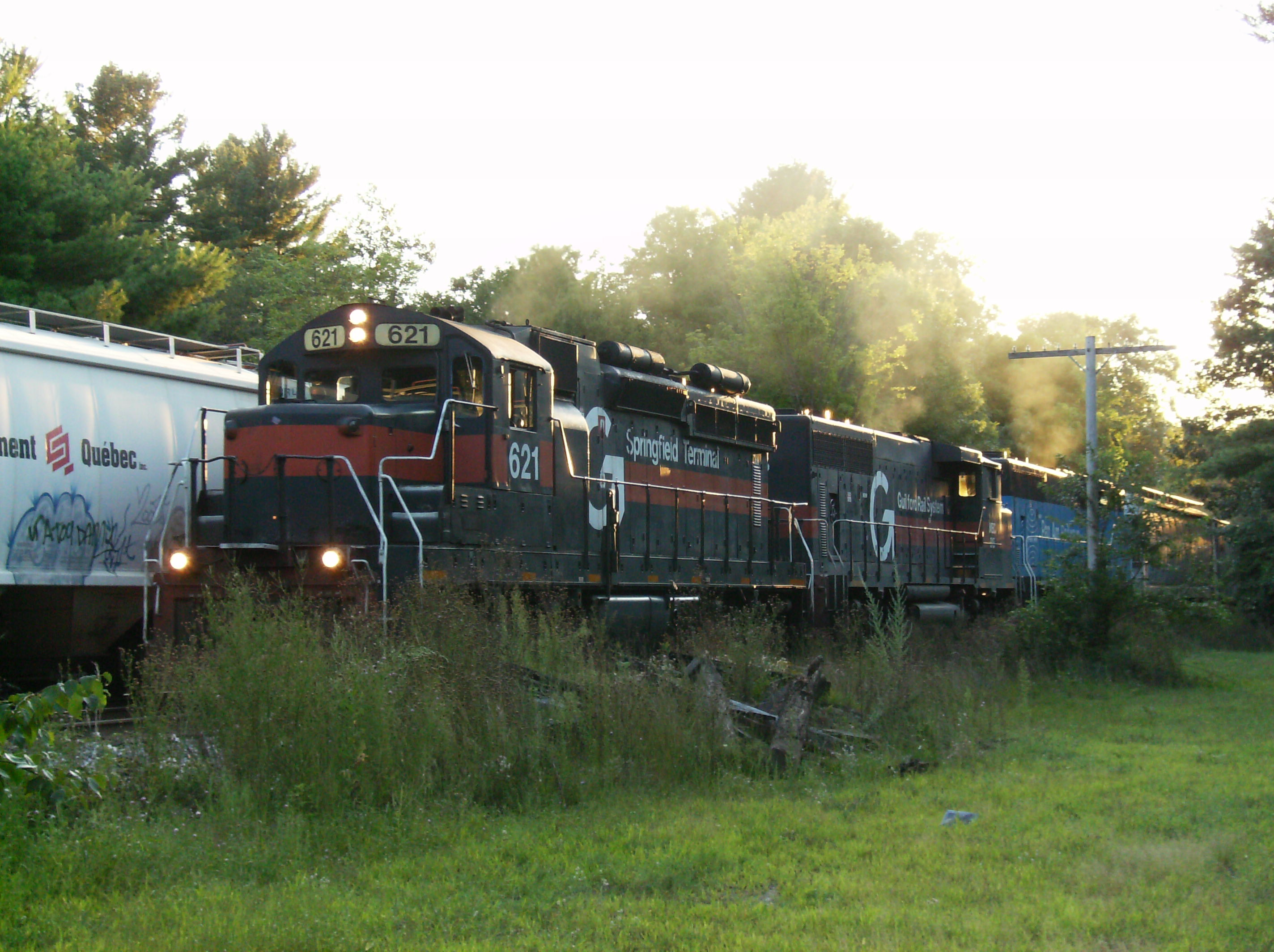
Pan Am Railways locomotive #621, an SD26, in Westford, Massachusetts (2007). The "blower bulge" (just aft of the cab) and the displaced roof-mounted "torpedo tube" air reservoirs — two distinct SD26 spotting features — are clearly visible.

Changing philosophies regarding motive power expenditures led the Santa Fe to begin trimming its SD26 roster in the Spring of 1985, when 44 of the locomotives were retired and traded to EMD in exchange for 15 new GP50s. The other 35 units were sold at the end of 1986 to Guilford Rail System (now known as Pan Am Railways). As of 2012, the last SD26, ST 643 (formerly ATSF 4673), was scrapped.

== See also ==
- Beep (locomotive)
- Santa Fe CF7
- List of GM-EMD locomotives
