= Santa Fe 1460 Beep =

Retired model of diesel-electric locomotive

The Beep
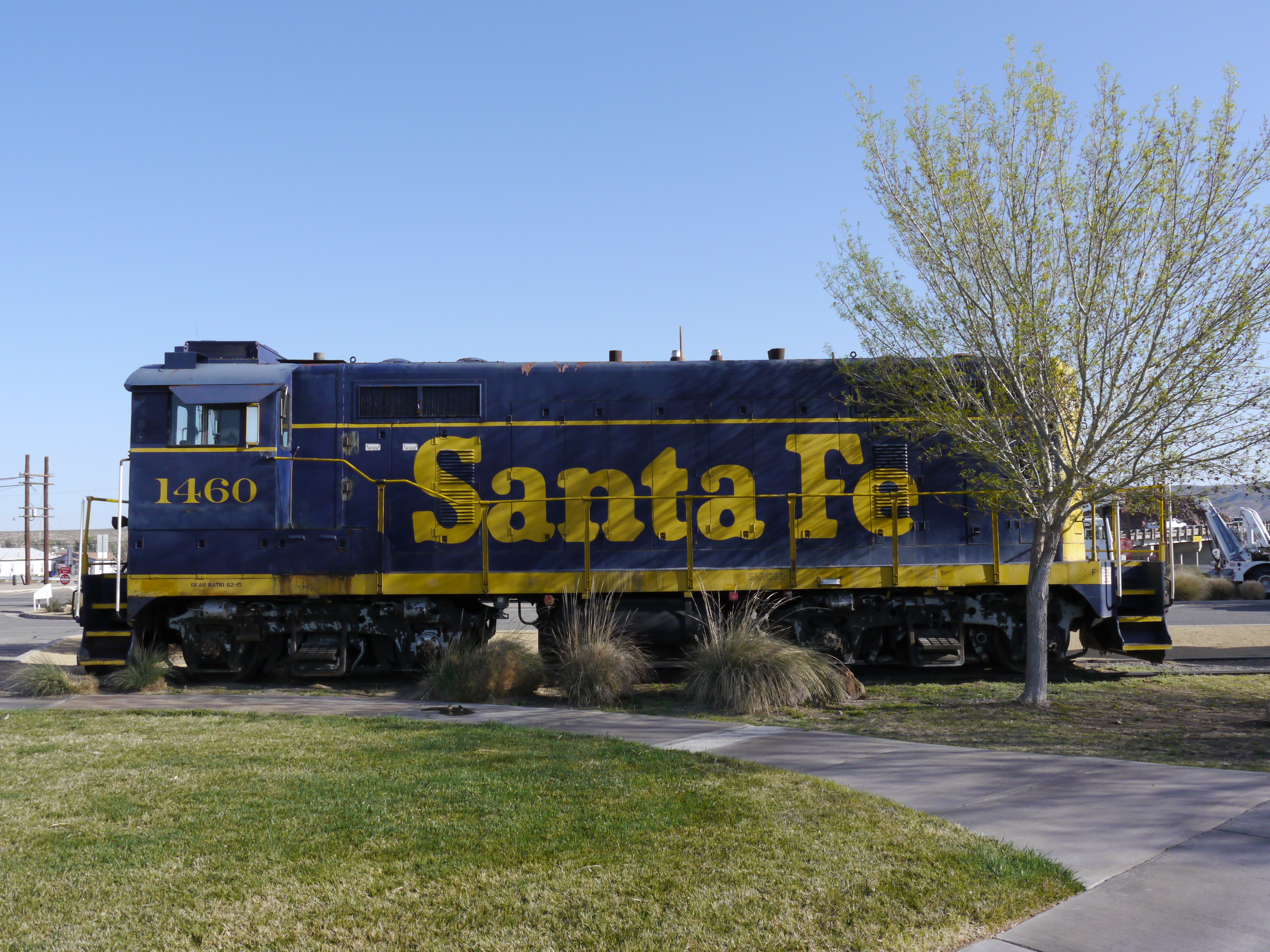
- Santa Fe's #1460, affectionately known to railfans as the "Beep", at the Western America Railroad Museum.
Type and origin
- Power type: Diesel-electric
- Builder: Baldwin Locomotive Works
- Build date: July 1943
- Rebuilder: Atchison, Topeka and Santa Fe Railway
- Rebuild date: December 1970
Specifications
- Configuration
  - AAR: B-B
  - UIC: Bo'Bo'
- Gauge: 4 ft 8 1/2 in (1,435 mm) standard gauge
- Length: 48 ft 0 in (14.63 m)
- Loco weight: 254,000 lb (115,000 kg)
- Prime mover: EMD 16-567BC
- Engine type: V16 2-stroke diesel
- Aspiration: Roots blower
- Displacement: 9,072 in^{3} (148.66 L)
- Generator: DC
- Traction motors: 4 DC
- Cylinders: 16
- Cylinder size: 8.5 in × 10 in (216 mm × 254 mm)
- Transmission: Diesel electric
- Loco brake: Straight air
- Train brakes: Air
Performance figures
- Maximum speed: 65 mph (105 km/h)
- Power output: 1,500 hp (1,119 kW)
- Tractive effort: 63,500 lbf (282 kN)
Career
- Operators: Atchison, Topeka and Santa Fe Railway; BNSF Railway
- Numbers: currently 1460
- Official name: SWBLW (SWitcher, Baldwin Locomotive Works)
- Locale: North America
- Retired: 2008
- Current owner: Western America Railroad Museum
- Disposition: On static display

The "Beep" (also referred to as the SWBLW) is an individual switcher locomotive built in 1970 by the Atchison, Topeka and Santa Fe Railway at its Cleburne, Texas, workshops. Technically a rebuild, the Beep (a portmanteau of a B-B wheel arrangement and "Baldwin Geep", whose official designation was derived from "SWitcher, Baldwin Locomotive Works") originally entered service on the Santa Fe as a Baldwin Model VO-1000.

Following its successful CF7 capital rebuilding program, the company hoped to determine if remanufacturing its aging, non-EMD end cab switchers by fitting them with new EMD prime movers was an economically viable proposition. The conversion procedure proved too costly and only the one unit was modified. In 2008-2009, this locomotive was retired and stored operational at Topeka, Kansas. In May 2009 the unit was donated to the Western America Railroad Museum in Barstow, California.

== History ==
In the early 1960s the Reading Company sent 14 of their VO-1000s to General Motors Electro-Motive Division to have them rebuilt to SW900 specifications. Unlike the "Beep", these locomotives retained most of their original carbodies. The units were subsequently given the designation VO-1000m.

=== Development ===
VO-1000 No. 67729 emerged from the Baldwin Locomotive Works Eddystone, Pennsylvania, facility in July 1943 dressed in the Santa Fe Zebra Stripe livery and bearing #2220. In the early 1960s the unit would take on the blue and yellow Billboard paint scheme with "SANTA FE" displayed in small yellow letters above the accent stripe, as was the standard for all yard switchers. It is these colors that #2220 displayed when it was selected as a test subject. Much as with the CF7 conversions, the unit was stripped down to its bare frame, and the long hood, 1,000 hp (750 kW) power plant, trucks, control gear, and electrical system scrapped; only the Baldwin cab remained.

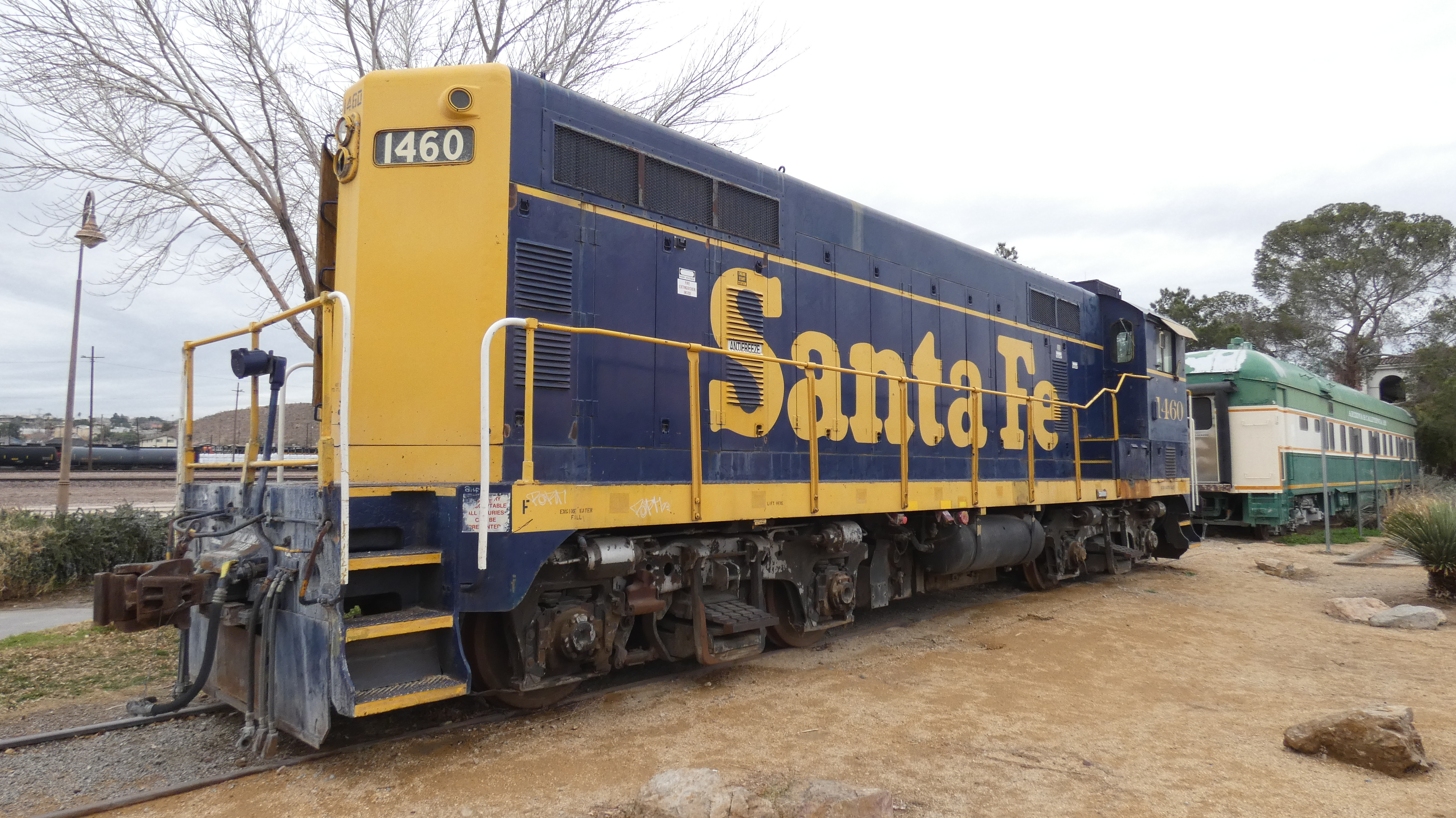
View of the EMD "GP" style long hood on the "Beep"

In a manner similar to the first CF7 modification, a sixteen-cylinder EMD 567 series diesel engine was fitted to the Baldwin's cast steel frame, which required a considerable amount of modification. A new long hood was fabricated by the shops to a GP7 pattern. The locomotive was configured in a B-B wheel arrangement and mounted atop two Blomberg B two-axle trucks, with all axles powered. The unit received an advanced electrical system.

The completed Beep rolled out of the Cleburne shops in December 1970 (with one of its original Baldwin builder's plates still affixed) sporting fresh blue and yellow paint, though now the words "Santa Fe" were applied in yellow in Cooper Black font (logotype) along the sides below the accent stripe in the style otherwise reserved for road switchers and other main line locomotives. It was also assigned #2450 (the first CF7 was given #2649, with successive numbers applied in descending order) and placed in service in south Texas.

=== In service ===
Train crews favored #2450 due to the superior riding qualities of its Blomberg trucks, which ran more smoothly than the original AAR Type-A switcher trucks. Being several tons heavier than a typical GP7 imparted a higher tractive effort, helpful when switching long cuts of cars. The Beep spent many years in lease service performing switching duties for the Port Terminal Railroad Association in Houston. In August, 1974 the unit was re-designated as #1160 as part of a general locomotive renumbering scheme. It was again renumbered along with the Santa Fe's few remaining EMD switchers and assigned #1460 in January, 1977.

The Beep was transferred to Cleburne as the shop switcher in the mid-1980s, where in 1985 it was given a number of external modifications. A cab air conditioning system was added, and the rear cab windows were modified from their original Baldwin pattern to a new three-pane configuration that accommodated the use of standard window glass sizes common to many EMD locomotives. The unit was given fresh paint (the Billboard colors were maintained) and placed back in service.

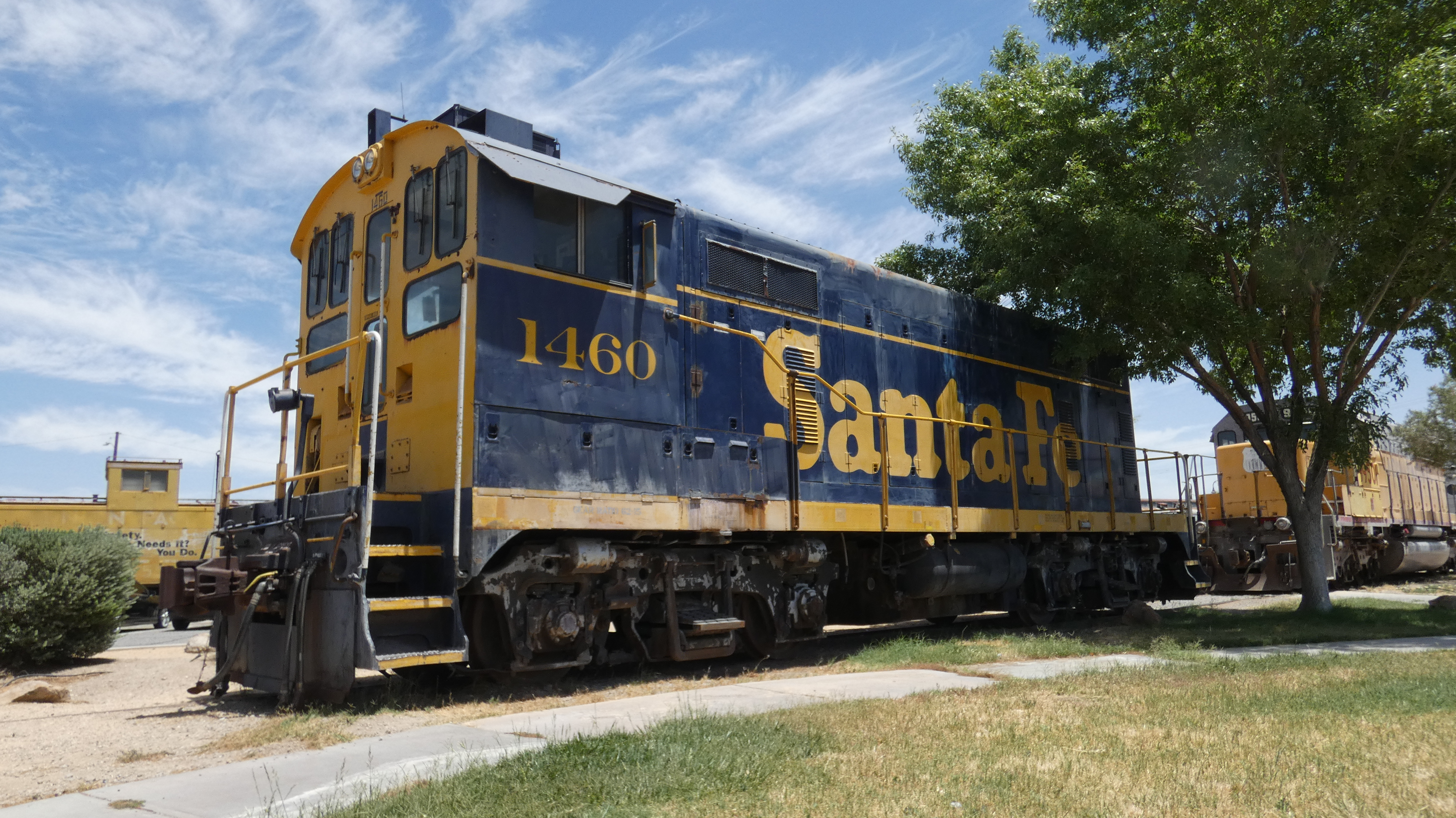
The original Baldwin style end cab sits in stark contrast to the full size EMD style long hood.

SW900 #1453, Santa Fe's last "standard" EMD switcher, was retired in 1987, thus making #1460 the only end cab switcher on the roster. The Beep continued working at Cleburne until the shops were closed later that year. Since then, the unit has worked as a shop switcher at both the Argentine shops in Kansas City and in Topeka, Kansas. The locomotive was equipped with remote control equipment (RCE) in the early 1990s so that it could be operated from a distance.

After Santa Fe merged with the Burlington Northern Railroad in 1995-1996 to form BNSF Railway, the Beep was one of only three blue and yellow units not affected by the new company's renumbering program. #1460's cab sides were affixed with a BNSF sublettering "patch" and retrofitted with a four-stack exhaust manifold. It was retired in December 2008, and later stored in Topeka, Kansas in 2009. In May 2009, the unit was donated to the Western America Railroad Museum in Barstow, California, where it remains on static display.

=== Footnote ===
Santa Fe had designated a handful of other non-EMD switcher locomotives for rebuilding around 1970 (including two Fairbanks-Morse H-10-44s), but all of these units were subsequently scrapped when it was determined that the required modifications were not cost effective.

== See also ==
- List of Baldwin diesel locomotives
- List of GM-EMD locomotives
- Santa Fe CF7
- Santa Fe SD26
