= Chambersburg and Shippensburg Railway =

Interurban trolley system in Pennsylvania, US

Overview
- Locale: Chambersburg, Pennsylvania
- Dates of operation: 1914–1928

Technical
- Track gauge: 5 ft 2 1/2 in (1,588 mm)

The Chambersburg and Shippensburg Railway was an interurban trolley system of the early 20th century in south central Pennsylvania. Built in 1914, the line ran from Chambersburg to Shippensburg. The line was abandoned at the same time as much of the nearby Chambersburg, Greencastle and Waynesboro Street Railway, on July 31, 1926.

Had the Cumberland Railway venture from Carlisle to Shippensburg succeeded, there would have been continuous trolley service from Harrisburg to the Mason–Dixon line, where the Shady Grove station provided a transfer to the standard-gauge Hagerstown and Frederick Railway in Maryland.

The C&S used a 5 ft 2 1/2 in (1,588 mm) broad gauge, similar to other Pennsylvania interurban lines.

== See also ==
- Chambersburg and Gettysburg Electric Railway
