= Boonsboro Historic District =

Historic district in Maryland, United States

- U.S. National Register of Historic Places
- U.S. Historic district
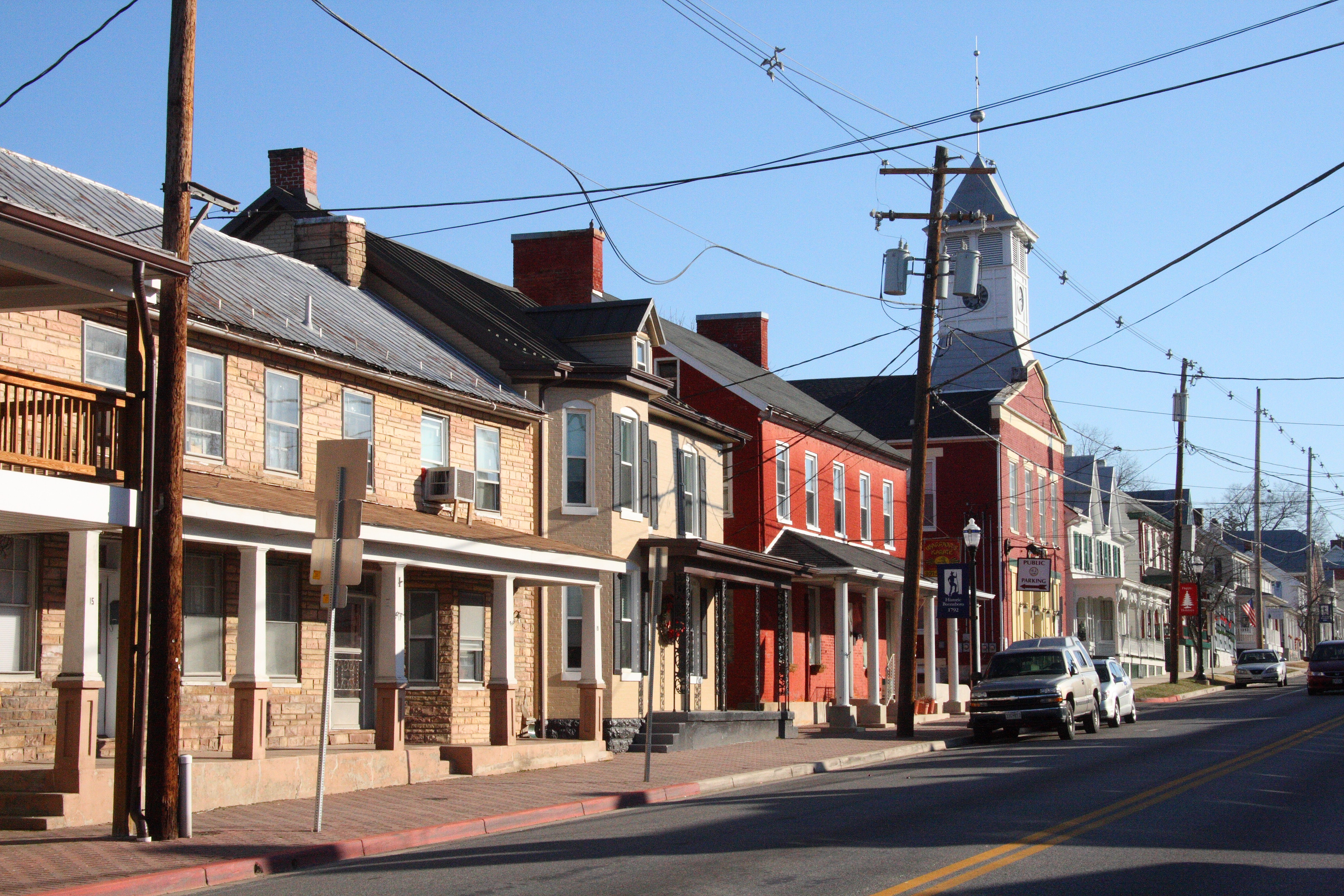

- Location within Maryland Location within the United States
- Location: Main St., Potomac St., St. Paul St., High St., Lakin Ave., Center St., Park Dr., Park Ln, Park View, Young Ave., Boonsboro, Maryland
- Coordinates: 39°30′22″N 77°39′09″W
- Area: 152 acres (62 ha)
- Built: 1792
- Built by: Lee, William H.
- Architectural style: Late 19th And 20th Century Revivals, Late Victorian
- NRHP reference No.: 05001431
- Added to NRHP: December 23, 2005

Boonsboro Historic District is a national historic district at Boonsboro, Washington County, Maryland, United States. The district includes 562 contributing elements. Its component buildings chronicle the town's development from its founding in 1792 through the mid 20th century. Most of the late 18th and early 19th century development in Boonsboro occurred along Main Street, then part of a principal market road between Williamsport, Hagerstown, Frederick, and Baltimore, Maryland. They are mainly of log, frame, or brick construction, with a few stone buildings interspersed. The majority of the buildings in the district date from the 1820-1850 period coinciding with peak use years of the National Road. Other features of the district include the Boonsboro Cemetery laid out about 1855 in a 19th-century curving plan with a number of exceptionally artistic gravestones, and the office/depot of the Hagerstown-Boonsboro Electric Railway. The period of significance, from 1792 to 1959 tracks the continuous growth and evolution of the town through the date by which the district had substantially achieved its current form and appearance.

It was added to the National Register of Historic Places in 2005.
