= Chambersburg and Gettysburg Electric Railway =

Interurban trolley system in Pennsylvania, US

Overview
- Locale: Chambersburg, Pennsylvania
- Dates of operation: 1903–1926

Technical
- Track gauge: 5 ft 2 1/2 in (1,588 mm)

The Chambersburg and Gettysburg Electric Railway was an early-20th-century interurban trolley line operating in south-central Pennsylvania. Construction began in 1903, with service running east from Chambersburg to Caledonia State Park. The line was to be extended to Gettysburg, but the cost of dealing with the steep grades on that section prevented completion. Due to disputes over line crossings with the Pennsylvania Railroad, the line did not open until 1905. It operated until December 21, 1926.

The C&G used a 5 ft 2 1/2 in (1,588 mm) broad gauge, similar to other Pennsylvania interurban lines.

== See also ==
- Chambersburg, Greencastle and Waynesboro Street Railway
- Chambersburg and Shippensburg Railway
