= Shady Grove, Pennsylvania =

Unincorporated community in Pennsylvania, US

- Unincorporated community
- A Farm near Shady Grove, Pennsylvania

- Location within Pennsylvania
- Coordinates: 39°46′40″N 77°40′07″W
- Country: United States
- State: Pennsylvania
- County: Franklin
- Elevation: 794 ft (242 m)
- Time zone: UTC-5 (Eastern (EST))
  - Summer (DST): UTC-4 (EDT)
- ZIP code: 17256
- Area codes: 223 & 717
- GNIS feature ID: 1187301

Shady Grove is an unincorporated community in Franklin County, in the U.S. state of Pennsylvania. An old variant spelling was "Shadygrove".

Shady Grove was platted in 1848. A post office has been in operation at Shady Grove since 1852. The Hagerstown and Frederick Railway served Shady Grove between 1905 and 1932.
