= Cumberland Railway (Pennsylvania) =

Interurban railway in Pennsylvania

Overview
- Locale: Carlisle, Pennsylvania
- Dates of operation: 1908–1918

Technical
- Track gauge: 5 ft 2 1/2 in (1,588 mm)

The Cumberland Railway was an interurban trolley system of the early 20th century in central Pennsylvania. Built in 1908, the line ran 12 miles (19 km) from Carlisle to Newville. Poorly capitalized, the line failed in 1918 and was scrapped.

The line was projected to extend to Harrisburg and Shippensburg, where it would have connected to the Chambersburg and Shippensburg Railway, and through that line to the Chambersburg, Greencastle and Waynesboro Street Railway, providing service from Harrisburg to Maryland.

The CR used a 5 ft 2 1/2 in (1,588 mm) broad gauge, similar to other Pennsylvania interurban lines.
