= Santa Fe CF7 =

EMD F-unit railroad locomotive converted for switching duty

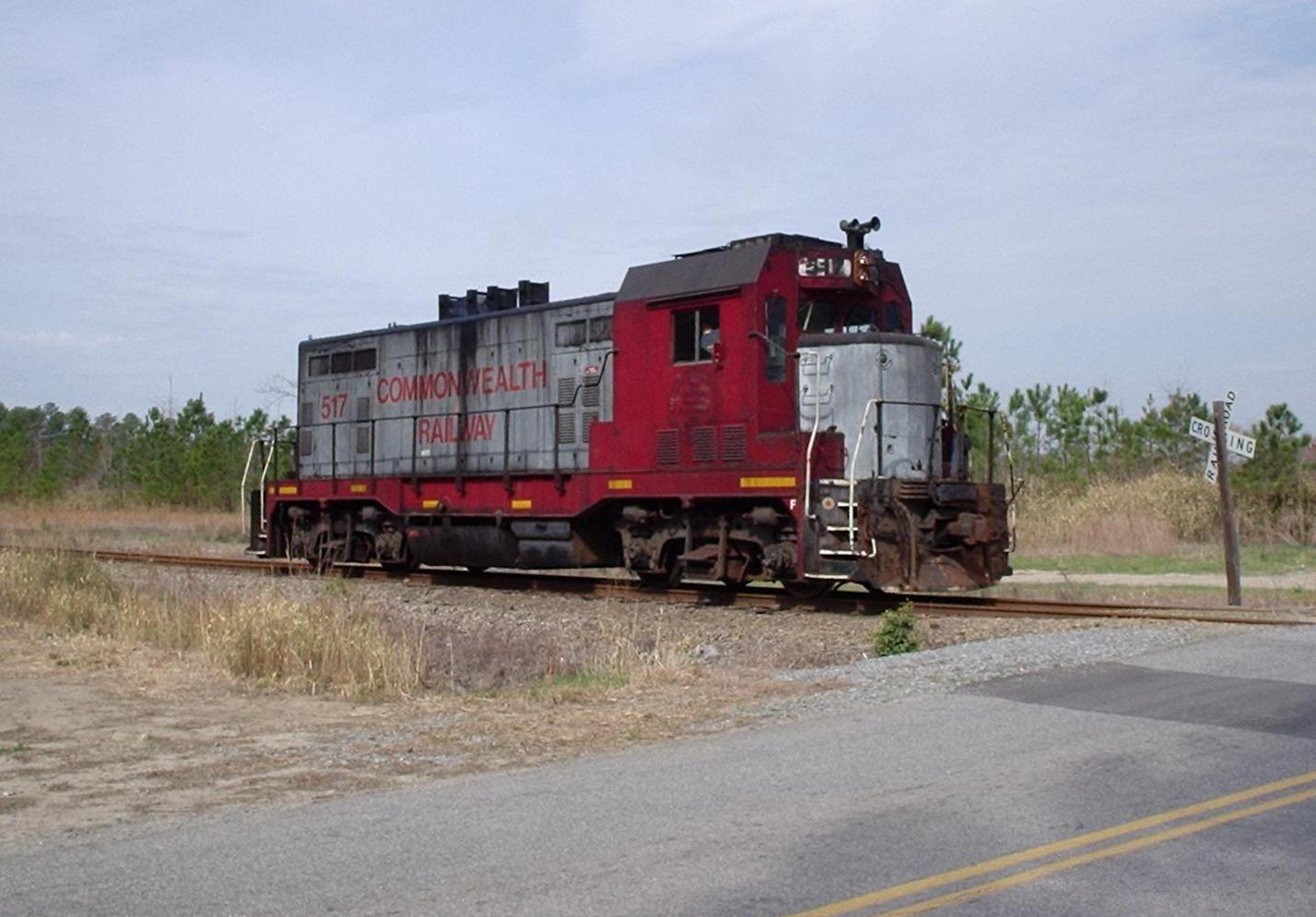
- Locomotive #517, a CF7, was the main power on the Commonwealth Railway in Suffolk, Virginia.
Type and origin
- Power type: Diesel-electric
- Builder: General Motors Electro-Motive Division (EMD); rebuilt by Atchison, Topeka & Santa Fe Railway, Cleburne, Texas shops
- Model: CF7
- Rebuild date: February 1970 – March 1978
- Number rebuilt: 233
Specifications
- Configuration
  - AAR: B-B
  - UIC: Bo′Bo′
- Gauge: 4 ft 8 1/2 in (1,435 mm)
- Length: 48 ft 6 in (14.78 m)
- Loco weight: 249,000 pounds (113 t)
- Prime mover: EMD 16-567BC
- Engine type: 2-stroke diesel
- Aspiration: Roots blower
- Displacement: 9,072 cu in (148.7 liters)
- Cylinders: V16
- Cylinder size: 8.5 in × 10 in (216 mm × 254 mm)
- Transmission: DC generator, DC traction motors
- Loco brake: Straight air
- Train brakes: 26 L air on later units, 24RL on earlier units
Performance figures
- Maximum speed: 65 mph (105 km/h)
- Power output: 1,750 hp (1,300 kW)
- Tractive effort: 62,250 lbf (276.9 kN)
Career
- Operators: Atchison, Topeka & Santa Fe Railway
- Locale: North America
- Disposition: Several still in service on short lines, 9 preserved

The Santa Fe CF7 is an EMD F7 railroad locomotive that has had its streamlined carbody removed and replaced with a custom-made "general purpose" body in order to adapt the unit for switching duty. As the original carbody was a structural component, all of the CF7s received strengthened side sills as part of the conversion. All of the conversions were performed by the Atchison, Topeka & Santa Fe Railway's Cleburne, Texas, workshops between February 1970 and March 1978. This was Santa Fe's most notable remanufacturing project, with 233 units completed during that time. The program was initiated in response to a system-wide need for more than 200 additional four-axle diesel road switchers to meet projected motive power demands on branch lines and secondary main lines.

Santa Fe's aging fleet of F7 units were approaching retirement age in 1970. These units were remanufactured into switchers and named CF7. Santa Fe used them for a decade and sold many of them to short lines around the states. Many of those were still being used as of 2003.

== In service ==
The CF7s worked within all segments of the Santa Fe system. While most saw action switching cars and transporting local freight, others could be found in multiple unit consists hauling mainline drags. The units distinguished themselves working on potash trains between Clovis and Carlsbad, New Mexico; Nos. 2612–2625, all equipped with remote control equipment (RCE), were typically "mated" to road slugs (converted cabless F-units). CF7s also powered grain trains across the Plains Division.

The Santa Fe had planned in the mid-1980s to renumber its CF7 fleet from 2649–2417 to 1131–1000 and repaint the units in the new Kodachrome paint scheme, all in preparation for the planned Southern Pacific Santa Fe Railroad merger. However, the Interstate Commerce Commission subsequently denied the merger application, and no CF7s were decorated in the new livery. Amtrak used some of them, with mixed results.

=== Secondary roles ===
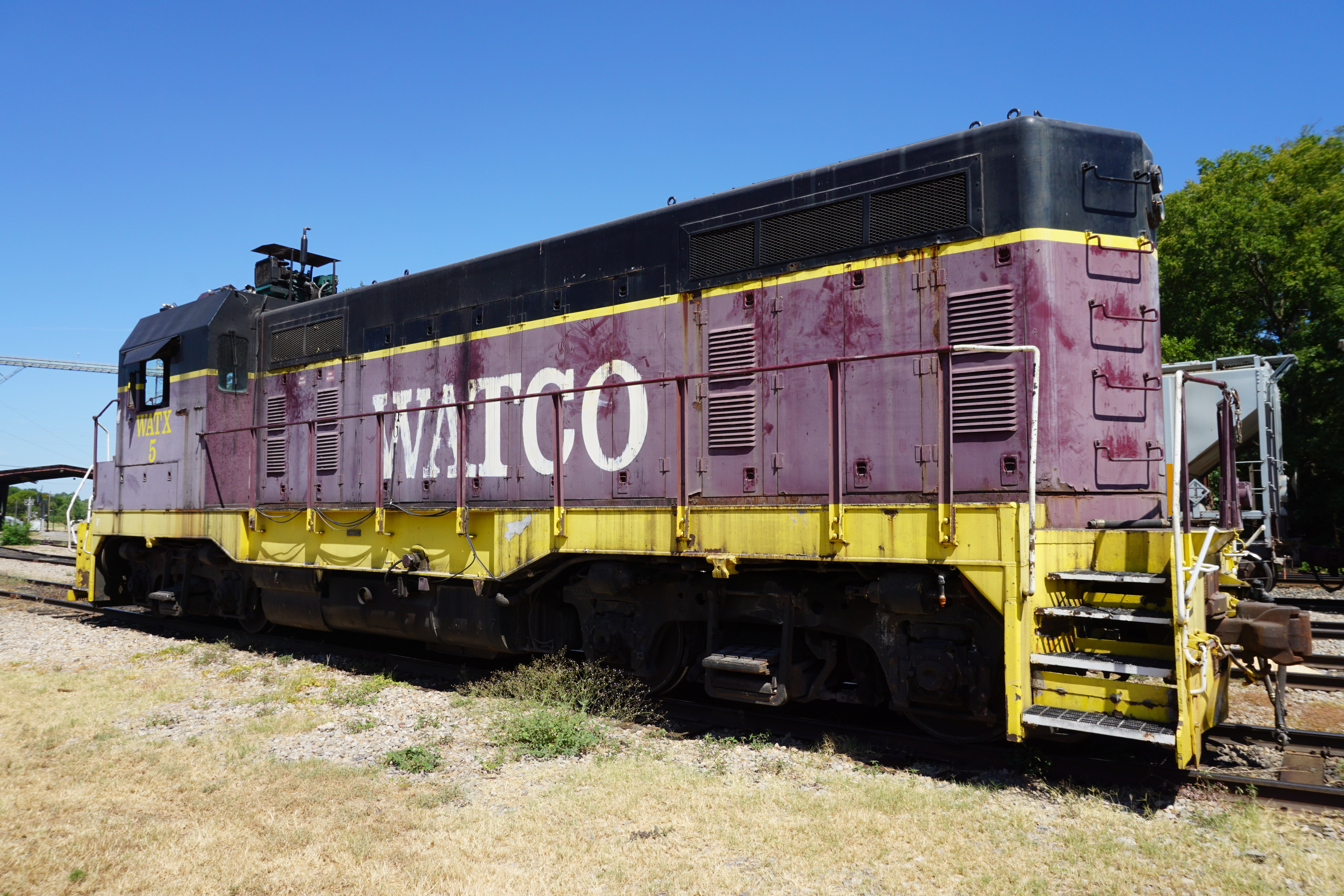
Watco CF7 #5 at Pittsburg, Texas, in August 2015

Changing philosophies regarding motive power expenditures led the Santa Fe to begin trimming its CF7 roster in 1984. The majority of the locomotives were sold for as little as $20,000 to short-line and regional railroads such as the Rail Link, Inc., the York Railway, and the Maryland & Delaware Railroad (6 were involved in wrecks and 3 others sent directly to the scrap yards), though Amtrak and GE Transportation were among the major initial purchasers. As of 2017, any CF7s still in service are over 70 years old.

== Preservation ==
Several CF7s are preserved and operational on many tourist and local trains. Among them are:

1. 2546 at the Kentucky Railway Museum
2. 2571 at the Oklahoma Railway Museum
3. IMC 204 at the Florida Railroad Museum
4. SCBG 2467, 2524, 2600, and 2641 at the Santa Cruz, Big Trees and Pacific Railway
5. 2428 and 2447 at the Museum of the American Railroad

== See also ==
- Beep (locomotive)
- List of GM-EMD locomotives
- Santa Fe SD26
