= Western America Railroad Museum =

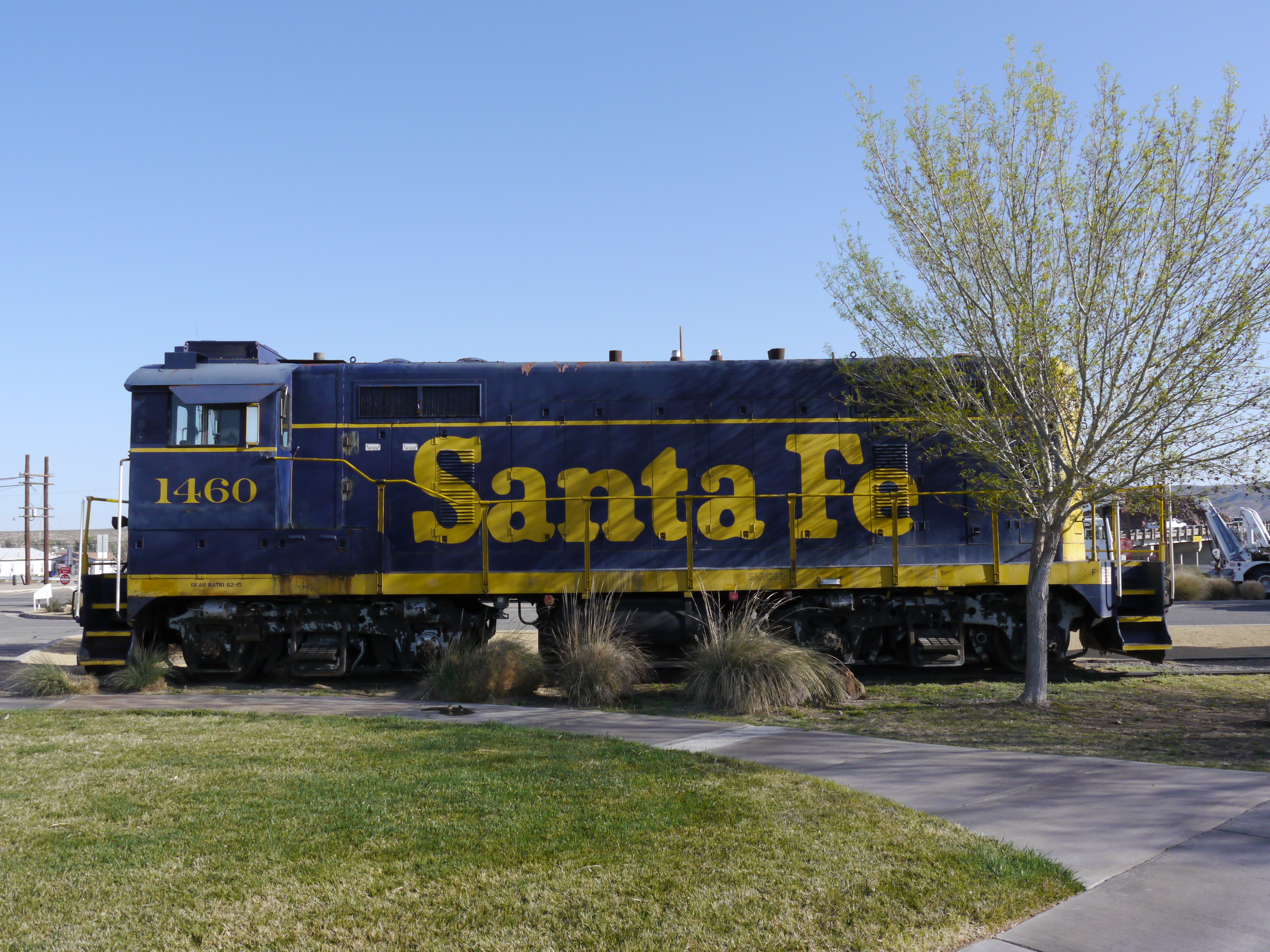
- ATSF #1460, "Beep," at the museum in 2012
- Established: 2001
- Location: Barstow, California
- Coordinates: 34.9049°N 117.0247°W
- Type: Railroad museum
- Website: https://barstowrailmuseums.com/

The Western America Railroad Museum is a railroad museum located in Barstow, California.

The museum collects, preserves and shares the history of railroading in the Pacific Southwest. It is located on the east side of the Harvey House Railroad Depot and is operated by a non-profit organization.

It houses displays inside the depot and has displays such as railroad artifacts, artwork, timetables, uniforms, tools and various other types of railroad memorabilia.

There are also outdoor displays of rolling stock, locomotives and general railroad operating equipment such as Atchison, Topeka and Santa Fe Railway (ATSF) #1460, also known as the “Beep”, Union Pacific EMD SD40-2 #9950, and ATSF's FP45 #95.

== External displays ==
The Western America Railroad Museum offers a multitude of static displays for rail-fans of all ages to climb on and experience the sheer mass of the rolling stock. The museum offers the following right outside its doors:

- ATSF 999728 (Caboose)
- UP 25599 (Caboose)
- ATSF Horse Express Car 199860
- USMC GE 44-Tonner 248236
- ATSF 95 FP45 (Locomotive)
- UP 9950 SD40-2 (ex. Missouri Pacific) (Locomotive)
- ATSF 1460 "The Beep" (Locomotive)
- GN 6307 SD40u (ex. ATSF, BNSF) (Locomotive)
- Arizona & California Railroad #58 Pullman Car (Business Car)
