= Hagerstown Roundhouse Museum =

Coordinates: 39°38′34″N 77°44′3″W

- Location: 300 South Burhans Boulevard, Hagerstown, Maryland, 21741
- Website: http://www.roundhouse.org/

The Hagerstown Roundhouse Museum located at 300 South Burhans Boulevard, Hagerstown, Maryland, USA, has exhibits relating to local railroad history and model railroads.

The Hagerstown Roundhouse Complex was built in 1939. The 25 stall roundhouse and shops were the major facility for maintenance and repairs of locomotives and cars in Western Maryland. The railroads were the largest employers in Washington County for more than 50 years. The Roundhouse facility was demolished on March 13, 1999.
