= List of Baldwin diesel locomotives =

A list of diesel locomotives built by the Baldwin Locomotive Works since 1939. The Baldwin Locomotive Works (BLW) was an American manufacturer of railway locomotives from 1825 to 1951. Originally located in Philadelphia, Pennsylvania, it moved to nearby Eddystone in the early 20th century. The company was for decades the world's largest producer of steam locomotives, but struggled to compete when demand switched to diesel locomotives. Baldwin produced the last of its 70,000-plus locomotives in 1951, before merging with the Lima-Hamilton Corporation on September 11, 1951, to form the Baldwin-Lima-Hamilton Corporation.

== Boxcabs ==
Model designation	Build year	Total produced	AAR wheel arrangement	Prime mover	Power output	Image
12-OE-1000/1 CC	1925	1	C-C	Knudsen Inverted-V	1000 hp (746 kW)	
8-OE-1000/1 CC	1929	1	C-C	Krupp inline	1000 hp (746 kW)	

== Switchers ==
Model designation	Build year	Total produced	AAR wheel arrangement	Prime mover	Power output	Image
8-0E-660/1 E	1936	1	B-B	6-VO	660 hp (490 kW)	
8-DE-900/1 E	1937	3	B-B	VO	900 hp (671 kW)	
Pre VO-600	1939	2	B-B	6-VO	660 hp (490 kW)	
VO-660	1939–1946	143	B-B	6-VO		
DS-4-4-660	1946–1949	139	B-B	606NA	660 hp (490 kW)	
DS-4-4-750	1949–1951	53	B-B	606NA	750 hp (560 kW)	
S-8	1950–1954	54 A units 9 B units	B-B	606	800 hp (600 kW)	
RS-4-TC	1953–1955	74	B-B	Caterpillar D397	400 hp (300 kW)	
VO-1000	1939–1946	548	B-B	8-VO	1,000 hp (750 kW)	
DS-4-4-1000	1946–1948	56	B-B	608NA	1,000 hp (750 kW)	
DS-4-4-1000	1948–1951	446	B-B	606SC	1,000 hp (750 kW)	
S-12	1951–1956	451	B-B	606A	1,200 hp (890 kW)	

== Road switchers ==
Model designation	Build year	Total produced	AAR wheel arrangement	Prime mover	Power output	Image
0-6-6-0 1000/1	1945	30 for USSR	C-C	8-VO	1,000 hp (750 kW)	
DRS-6-4-660NA	1946–1948	100 for SNCF; 6 for Morocco	A1A-A1A	606NA	660 hp (490 kW)	
DRS-6-4-750	1949	1 for Morocco	A1A-A1A	606NA	750 hp (560 kW)	
DRS-6-4-1000	1948–1949	20 for Algeria	A1A-A1A	606SC	1,000 hp (750 kW)	
DRS-4-4-1000	1948–1950	9 (USA); 13 (Canada)	B-B	606SC	1,000 hp (750 kW)	
RS-12	1951–1956	50	B-B	606A	1,200 hp (890 kW)	
DRS-6-4-1500	1946–1952	91	A1A-A1A	608SC	1,500 hp (1,100 kW)	
AS-416	1950–1955	25	A1A-A1A	608A	1,600 hp (1,200 kW)	
DRS-4-4-1500	1947–1950	35	B-B	608SC	1,500 hp (1,100 kW)	
AS-16	1950–1955	127	B-B	608A	1,600 hp (1,200 kW)	
DRS-6-6-1500	1948–1950	83	C-C	608SC	1,500 hp (1,100 kW)	
AS-616	1950–1954	214 A units 7 B units	C-C	608A	1,600 hp (1,200 kW)	

== Transfer units ==
Model designation	Build year	Total produced	AAR wheel arrangement	Prime mover	Power output	Image
DT-6-6-2000	1946	1	C-C	608NA (×2)	2,000 hp (1.49 MW)	
DT-6-6-2000	1948–1950	45	C-C	606SC (×2)	2,000 hp (1.49 MW)	
RT-624	1951–1954	24	C-C	606A (×2)	2,400 hp (1.79 MW)	

== Cab units ==
Model designation	Build year	Total produced	AAR wheel arrangement	principal motor	Power output	Image
4-8+8-4-750/8-DE	1943	1	2-D-D-2	408 (×8)	6,000 hp (4.47 MW)	(only 4 of the 8 engines actually installed)
0-6-6-0 1000/1 DE	1945	30 for Soviet Railways	C-C		1,000 hp (750 kW)	
DR-12-8-1500/2 "Centipede"	1945–1948	56	2-D-D-2	608SC (×2)	3,000 hp (2.24 MW)	
DR-6-4-2000	1945	2	A1A-A1A	8-VO (×2)	2,000 hp (1.49 MW)	
DR-6-4-2000	1946–1948	9	A1A-A1A	608NA (×2)	2,000 hp (1.49 MW)	
DR-6-4-2000 "Sharknose"	1948	18 A units 9 B units	A1A-A1A	606SC (×2)	2,000 hp (1.49 MW)	
DR-6-2-1000	1948	1	A1A-3	606SC (×1)	1,000 hp (750 kW)	
DR-6-4-1500	1947–1948	7 A units 2 B units	A1A-A1A	608SC	1,500 hp (1.12 MW)	
DR-4-4-1500 "Babyface"	1947–1948	22 A units 11 B units	B-B	608SC	1,500 hp (1.12 MW)	
DR-4-4-1500 "Sharknose"	1949–1950	36 A units 36 B units	B-B	608SC	1,500 hp (1.12 MW)	
RF-16 "Sharknose"	1950–1953	109 A units 51 B units	B-B	608A	1,600 hp (1.19 MW)	
RF 615 E1	1953	51	Co-Co	Baldwin 608-A	1,500 hp (1.12 MW)	
RP-210	1956–1957	3	B-2	12-Maybach	1,000 hp (750 kW)	

== See also ==
- Santa Fe 1460 Beep: a VO-1000 rebuilt by the Atchison, Topeka and Santa Fe Railway in 1970.
- List of Baldwin steam locomotives
