= SMS Rail Lines =

Overview
- Headquarters: Bridgeport, New Jersey, U.S.
- Reporting mark: SLRS, SNY
- Locale: Philadelphia metropolitan area Albany, New York, U.S.
- Dates of operation: 1994–present

Technical
- Track gauge: 4 ft 8 1/2 in (1,435 mm) standard gauge
- Length: 69 mi (111 km)

Other
- Website: www.smsrail.com

SMS Rail Lines (reporting mark SLRS) is a shortline railroad based at Pureland Industrial Park in Bridgeport, New Jersey. The company handles all freight car delivery to businesses located within the industrial park. It also operates lines in Morrisville, Pennsylvania, and Guilderland, New York. Guilderland-based operations operate as SMS Rail Lines of New York, LLC (reporting mark SNY). SMS maintains many locomotives built by the Baldwin Locomotive Works. SMS provides chemical off-loading equipment and transload facilities to enable businesses to receive rail freight traffic. The company also operates the Woodstown Central Railroad, a tourist railroad based out of Woodstown, New Jersey.

== Operations ==
In the Philadelphia metropolitan area, SMS Rail Lines operates both industrial park switching operations and a county controlled rail line.

- Morrisville – Serves the Penn Warner Industrial Park in Morrisville, Pennsylvania, with access to the Conrail Shared Assets Operations Morrisville Yard
- Pureland – Serves the Pureland Industrial Complex in Logan Township, New Jersey, interchanging with Conrail Shared Assets Operations Penns Grove Secondary
- Westville – Serves the Sunoco Logistics Eagle Point terminal in Westville, New Jersey, interchanging with Conrail Shared Assets Operations.
- Salem - Serves the Salem County Short Line between Salem, New Jersey, Woodstown, New Jersey, and Swedesboro, New Jersey interchanging with Southern Railroad of New Jersey. Woodstown Central excursion trains operate out of Woodstown.

In Guilderland, New York, SMS Rail Lines of New York, LLC serves the Northeastern Industrial Park, interchanging with CSX Transportation at Guilderland Center, NY and Norfolk Southern at Delanson, NY.

== History ==
SMS Rail Lines began operating in the Philadelphia area in June 1994. In November 2006, the railroad began operations in Albany, New York. The company began passenger excursions out of Pilesgrove Township, New Jersey in 2022 and now runs scheduled excursions. Passenger excursions along the Salem Branch are operated as the Woodstown Central Railroad out of a passenger station in South Woodstown.

== Motive power ==
SMS runs a variety of locomotives, most being built by the Baldwin Locomotive works. SMS also owns units built by GM's Electro-Motive Diesel and GE Transportation.

- ALCO
  - 0-6-0 steam No. 9 (1), in service as of November 16, 2023.
- Baldwin:
  - VO-660 diesel (2)
  - VO-1000 diesel (1)
  - DS-4-4-660 diesel (1)
  - DS-4-4-750 diesel (1)
  - DS-4-4-1000 diesel (2)
  - S-12 diesel (14)
  - AS-616 diesel (3)
- EMD:
  - EMD SW14 diesel (1)
  - SW1200RS diesel (1)
  - EMD FP7 diesel (1)
  - GP38-3 diesel (1)
- GE:
  - B23-7 diesel (4)

=== Former ===
- ALCO
  - FA-2 (1; privately owned) - Sold to Adirondack Railroad
