= Baldwin DS-4-4-660 =

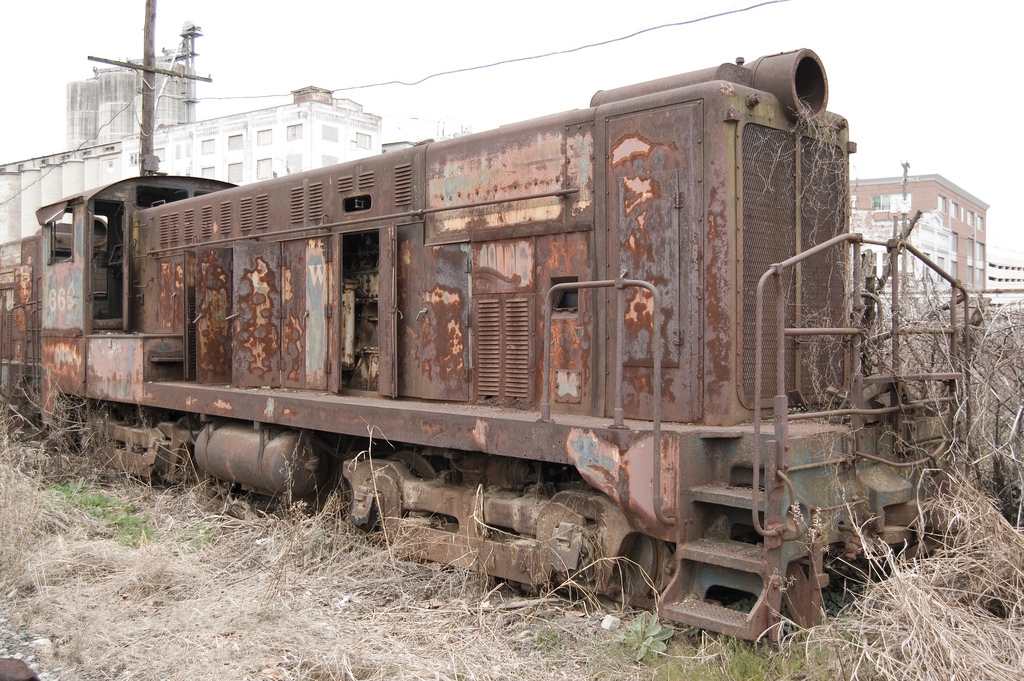
- A very rusty Baldwin DS-4-4-660 locomotive sits next to the NS main in Roanoke, VA. This is one of "The Lost Engines of Roanoke" and is Chesapeake Western #663.
Type and origin
- Power type: Diesel-electric
- Builder: Baldwin Locomotive Works
- Build date: June 1946 to May 1949
- Total produced: 139
Specifications
- Configuration
  - AAR: B-B
- Gauge: 4 ft 8 1/2 in (1,435 mm)
- Length: 46 ft 6 1/4 in (14.18 m)
- Width: 9 ft 11 1/4 in (3.03 m)
- Height: 14 ft (4.27 m)
- Loco weight: 196,600 lb (89,200 kg)
- Prime mover: 606NA
- RPM range: 625 rpm max.
- Engine type: Four-stroke diesel
- Aspiration: Normally aspirated, solid injection
- Displacement: 1,979 cu in (32.43 L) per cylinder 11,874 cu in (194.58 L) total
- Generator: DC type 480
- Traction motors: Westinghouse 362-D
- Cylinders: Straight-6
- Cylinder size: 12 3/4 in × 15 1/2 in (324 mm × 394 mm))
- Loco brake: Air
- Train brakes: Air
Performance figures
- Power output: 660 hp (492 kW)
- Tractive effort: 56,500 lb (25,600 kg)
Career
- Locale: North America

The Baldwin DS-4-4-660 was a four-axle 660 horsepower (490 kW) diesel-electric switcher locomotive built by the Baldwin Locomotive Works at it Eddystone, Pennsylvania factory between 1946 and 1949. It replaced the 660 horsepower (490 kW) VO-660 in their catalog, and was in turn replaced by the 750 horsepower (560 kW) DS-4-4-750. It was the low power companion to Baldwin's DS-4-4-1000 models.

== Original owners ==
Image	Railroad	Quantity	Road numbers	Notes
	American Cyanamid Company	1	13	
	American Rolling Mill Company	1	1001	
	Chesapeake Western Railway	3	661–663	661 scrapped, 662 and 663 survive in Roanoke, VA.
	Chicago, St. Paul, Minneapolis and Omaha Railway (“Omaha Road”)	1	71	
	Chicago and North Western Railway	3	1259–1261	
	Crows Nest Pass Coal	1	1	
	Escanaba and Lake Superior Railroad	1	101	
	Erie Railroad	5	381–385	
	Georgia Northern Railway	1	102	
	Long Island Rail Road	4	409–412	
	New Orleans Public Belt Railroad	6	44–49	
	Norfolk Southern Railway	3	661–663	
	Patapsco and Back Rivers Railroad	4	306–309	
	Pennsylvania Railroad	99	5957–5966, 9000–9049, 9110–9121, 9210–9236	PRR Class BS-6a
	Sloss-Sheffield Steel	1	30	
	Tennessee Valley Authority	1	100	
	Wabash Railroad	2	201–202	
	Wyandotte Southern Railroad	1	D100	
	Wyandotte Terminal Railroad	1	104	
	Total	139		

== Preservation ==
• Sloss Sheffield Steel #30 is preserved at the Sloss Furnaces National Historic Landmark in Birmingham, AL • Chesapeake Western No. 662 is preserved at the Virginia Museum of Transportation in Downtown Roanoke Virginia. • Chesapeake Western No. 663 is being restored at the Roanoke Chapter NRHS in Roanoke, Virginia
