= Baldwin DS-4-4-750 =

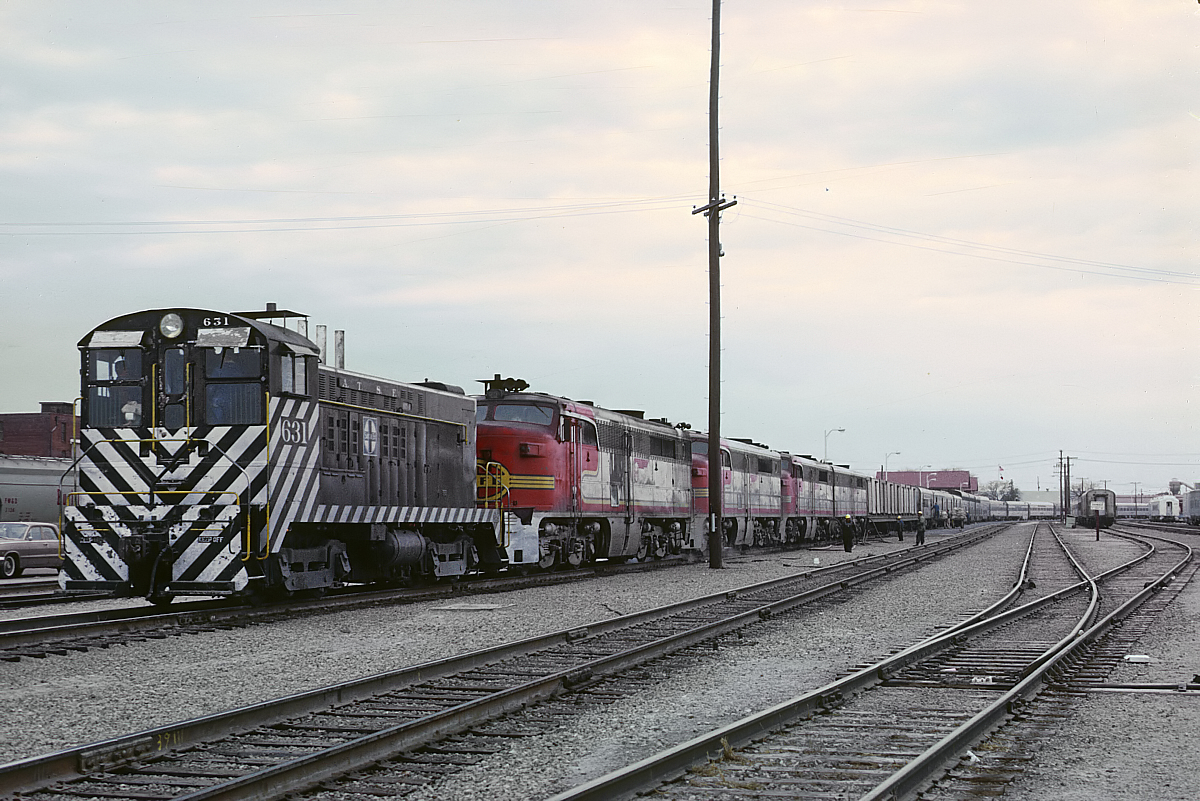
- #631, a DS-4-4-750 of the Atchison, Topeka and Santa Fe Railway switches a passenger train in Amarillo, Texas
Type and origin
- Power type: Diesel-electric
- Builder: Baldwin Locomotive Works
- Model: DS-4-4-750
- Build date: July 1949 to February 1951
- Total produced: 53
Specifications
- Configuration
  - AAR: B-B
  - UIC: B′B′
- Gauge: 4 ft 8 1/2 in (1,435 mm)
- Prime mover: 606NA
- RPM range: 625 rpm max.
- Engine type: Four-stroke diesel
- Aspiration: Normally aspirated, solid injection
- Displacement: 1,979 cu in (32.43 L) per cylinder 11,874 cu in (194.58 L) total
- Generator: DC generator
- Traction motors: DC traction motors
- Cylinders: Straight-6
- Cylinder size: 12 3/4 in × 15 1/2 in (324 mm × 394 mm)
- Transmission: Electric
- Loco brake: Air
- Train brakes: Air
Performance figures
- Power output: 750 hp (559 kW)
Career
- Locale: North America

The Baldwin DS-4-4-750 was a four-axle 750 horsepower (560 kW) diesel-electric switcher locomotive built by the Baldwin Locomotive Works at it Eddystone, Pennsylvania factory between 1949 and 1951. It was a bridge between the 660 horsepower (490 kW) DS-4-4-660 and the S-8. It was the low power companion in Baldwin's catalog to their DS-4-4-1000 and the S-12.

== Original owners ==
Image	Railroad	Quantity	Road numbers	Notes
	Baldwin Locomotive Works (plant)	1	301	to Weyerhaeuser Timber Company 301 in 1956; became Texas South-Eastern 301, R.J. Corman (Texas Line) 301, and recently sold to SMS Rail Lines.
	Baldwin Locomotive Works (demonstrators)	2	750–751	to Weyerhaeuser Timber Company 101–102. 101 preserved at Train Mountain Railroad Museum.
	American Cyanamid Company	1	14	
	American Steel and Wire Company	1	20	
	Atchison, Topeka and Santa Fe Railway	9	525–533	
	California Western Railroad	2	51–52	
	Erie Railroad	4	386–389	
	Pennsylvania Railroad	24	5595–5618	
	Texas Mexican Railway	2	509–510	
	Warner Sand and Gravel	1	14	This locomotive is now on the Allentown and Auburn Railroad in Topton, Pennsylvania undergoing restoration.
	Youngstown Sheet and Tube	6	608–610, 700–702	
	Total	53		

Page 40 of the Dolzall brothers book "Diesels from Eddystone" describes the DR-4-4-750 as a "Horsepower boost for a lagging seller." Baldwin dropped the DR-4-4-660 model and introduced the new 750 HP DR-4-4-750. The Atchison, Topeka & Santa Fe (AT&SF) purchased nine in August 1948 and 21 units were sold in 1949 to six different customers.

== Preservation ==
• Texas Mexican #510 is owned by the Gulf Coast NRHS and remains stored in Houston, Texas.

• Warner Sand & Gravel #14 is undergoing restoration at the Allentown and Auburn Railroad in Topton, Pennsylvania.
