= Baldwin S-12 =

Diesel-electric switcher locomotive

Baldwin S12
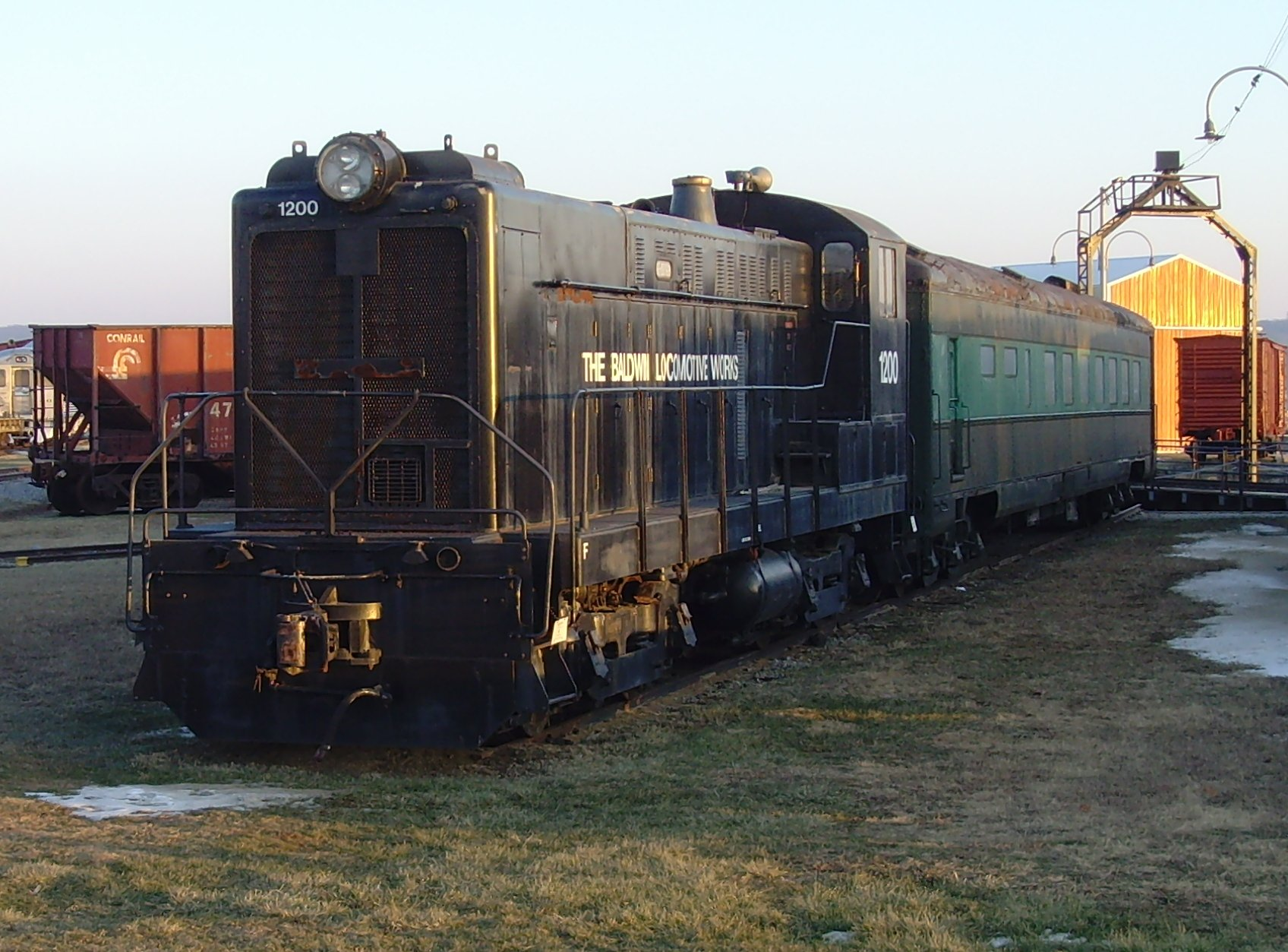
- A preserved S-12 at the Railroad Museum of Pennsylvania.
Type and origin
- Power type: Diesel-electric
- Builder: Baldwin Locomotive Works
- Model: S12
- Build date: January 1951–October 1956
- Total produced: 451
Specifications
- Configuration
  - AAR: B-B
  - UIC: Bo'Bo'
- Gauge: 4 ft 8 1/2 in (1,435 mm) standard gauge
- Trucks: AAR type A
- Wheel diameter: 40 in (1,016 mm)
- Minimum curve: 44° (133.47 ft or 40.68 m radius)
- Wheelbase: 30 ft 8 in (9.35 m)
- Length: 48 ft (15 m)
- Width: 10 ft (3.0 m)
- Height: 14 ft (4.3 m)
- Loco weight: 240,000 lb (108,862 kg)
- Prime mover: 606A
- RPM range: 625 rpm max
- Engine type: Four-stroke diesel
- Aspiration: Turbocharger Elliott Company H503 (215 hp (160 kW))
- Displacement: 1,979 cu in (32.43 L) per cylinder 11,874 cu in (194.58 L) total
- Generator: Westinghouse YG40D
- Traction motors: Westinghouse 362D (4)
- Cylinders: Six
- Cylinder size: 12 3/4 in × 15 1/2 in (324 mm × 394 mm)
Performance figures
- Maximum speed: 60 mph (97 km/h)
- Power output: 1,200 hp (895 kW)
- Tractive effort: Starting: 72,000 lbf (33,000 kgf) @30% Continuous: 34,000 lbf (15,000 kgf) @10.8 mph (17.4 km/h)
Career
- Disposition: Six preserved, remainder scrapped

Balwin DS-4-4-660 / DS-4-4-1000
Type and origin
- Power type: Diesel-electric
- Model: DS-4-4-660 / DS-4-4-1000
- Build date: 660: June 1946 to May 1949; 1000: January 1951 – November 1951
- Total produced: 660: 139; 1000: 446
Specifications
- Configuration
  - AAR: B-B
- Gauge: 4 ft 8 1/2 in (1,435 mm) standard gauge
- Trucks: AAR Type A truck
- Wheel diameter: 36 in (914 mm)
- Minimum curve: 44° (133.47 ft (40.68 m) radius)
- Wheelbase: 30 ft 8 in (9.35 m)
- Length: 46 ft 6 1/4 in (14.18 m)
- Width: 9 ft 11 1/4 in (3.03 m)
- Height: 14 ft (4.27 m)
- Loco weight: 660: 196,600 lb (89,200 kg); 1000: 230,000 lb (100,000 kg)
- Prime mover: 660: Baldwin 606NA; 1000: 608NA later 606SC
- RPM range: 625 rpm max.
- Engine type: 606: Straight-6; 608: Straight-8; Four-stroke diesel
- Aspiration: 606NA and 608NA: Natural; 606SC: Turbocharged
- Displacement: 1,979 cu in (32.43 L) per cylinder 606: 11,874 cu in (194.58 L) total 608: 15,832 cu in (259.44 L) total
- Generator: West’hse 480 DC
- Traction motors: (4) West’hse 362-D
- Cylinders: Six
- Cylinder size: 12 3/4 in × 15 1/2 in (324 mm × 394 mm)
- Loco brake: Air
- Train brakes: Air
Performance figures
- Power output: 660: 660 hp (492 kW); 1000: 1,000 hp (746 kW)
- Tractive effort: 660: 56,500 lb (25,600 kg); 1000: 57,500 lb (26,100 kg)
Career
- Locale: North America

The Baldwin S-12 or BLH S12 is a 1,200-horsepower (890 kW) diesel-electric switcher locomotive. Powered by a turbocharged 6-cylinder version of the 606A diesel prime mover, S12s were known for their "lugging" power, despite being temperamental. Like most Baldwin-Lima-Hamilton switchers, the S12 had AAR Type-A switcher trucks in a B-B wheel arrangement. 451 units were built between 1951 and 1956, when BLH left the locomotive market.

== Previous models ==
Baldwin made a number of switchers with similar dimensions and body styles. The first body style, used in VO models, had a slightly pointed nose with a round radiator opening. The second and third body style, almost indistinguishable and used interchangeably, had a flat nose and rectangular radiator opening. Various exhaust stacks were used, and are not an effective spotting feature, except that turbocharged models always had one large stack offset to the side.

The VO-660 was built between April 1939 and May 1946. It was powered by a naturally aspirated six cylinder engine rated at 600-horsepower (450 kW). 142 were built. Baldwin replaced the VO-660 with the model DS-4-4-660 in 1946.

The VO-1000 was built between January 1939 and December 1946. It was powered by a naturally aspirated eight cylinder engine rated at 1,000-horsepower (750 kW). Some had the Batz truck originally developed by the Atchison, Topeka and Santa Fe Railway as a leading truck for steam locomotives. 548 VO-1000s were built.

The DS-4-4-660 was built between 1946 and 1949. It replaced the 600-horsepower (450 kW) VO-660 as the low power companion to the DS-4-4-1000 models. 139 were built.

The DS-4-4-1000 was a 1,000-horsepower (750 kW) model built between 1946 and 1951. The first units (56 locomotives) were powered by an 8-cylinder normally aspirated prime mover, but from 1948 a change was made to a 6-cylinder turbocharged engine. A total of 502 were built.

== Original buyers ==
| Image | Railroad | Quantity | Road number | Notes |
|---|---|---|---|---|
| | Baldwin-Lima-Hamiton (demonstrators) | 2 | 1200–1201 | to Rock Island 758–759 |
| | Atlanta and West Point Rail Road | 1 | 678 | |
| | Akron and Barberton Belt Railroad | 2 | 27-28 | |
| | American Smelting and Refining Company | 2 | 1954–1955 | |
| | Apache Railway | 1 | 600 | |
| | Armco Steel, Hamilton, Ohio | 1 | 706 | |
| | Baltimore and Ohio Railroad | 5 | 463–467 | Renumbered 9274–9278 |
| | Calumet and Hecla Mining Company | 1 | 203 | |
| | Central of Georgia Railway | 4 | 311–314 | |
| | Central Railroad of New Jersey | 7 | 1053–1059 | |
| | Chicago and North Western Railway | 16 | 1073–1076, 1106–1109, 1117–1121, 1126–1128 | |
| | Chicago, Milwaukee, St. Paul and Pacific Railroad (“Milwaukee Road”) | 21 | 1905–1925 | Renumbered 900–914, 920–925 (not in order) |
| | Copper Range Railroad | 1 | 200 | Preserved at the Lake Superior Railroad Museum |
| | Erie Railroad | 12 | 617–628 | |
| | Erie Mining Company | 4 | 400–403 | Renumbered 7240–7243. 403 last locomotive shipped by BLH |
| | Great Northern Railway | 5 | 24–28 | |
| | Kansas City Southern Railway | 4 | 1160–1163 | |
| | Lehigh Valley Railroad | 14 | 230–243 | |
| | Michigan Limestone | 2 | 116–117 | |
| | Missouri-Kansas-Texas Railroad | 15 | 1201–1210 | Renumbered |
| | Monongahela Railway | 27 | 400–426 | |
| | Missouri Pacific Railroad | 20 | 9200–9219 | Renumbered 1260–1279 |
| | Missouri Pacific (International-Great Northern Railroad) | 10 | 9220–9226, 9230–9232 | |
| | Missouri Pacific (St. Louis, Brownsville and Mexico Railway) | 3 | 9227–9229 | |
| | Missouri Pacific (Union Railway of Memphis) | 7 | 9233–9239 | |
| | McCloud River Railroad | 2 | 30–31 | #31 built as 800 hp; convertible to 1,200 hp (but never converted) |
| | New Orleans Public Belt Railroad | 2 | 61–62 | |
| | New York Central Railroad | 21 | 9308–9328 | |
| | Oliver Iron Mining Company | 1 | 933 | |
| | Patapsco and Back Rivers Railroad | 3 | 345–347 | |
| | Pennsylvania Railroad | 87 | 8100–8104, 8732–8796, 8976–8993 | PRR Class BS-12m |
| | Pennsylvania-Reading Seashore Lines | 11 | 6017–6021, 6028–6033 | |
| | Rayonier, Inc. | 2 | 201–202 | |
| | Seaboard Air Line Railroad | 10 | 1462–1465, 1476–1481 | to Seaboard Coast Line Railroad 203–206, 217–222 |
| | Sierra Railroad | 2 | 40, 42 | |
| | Southern Railway | 10 | 2290–2299 | |
| | Southern Pacific Company | 56 | 1442–1513, 1539–1550 | |
| | Southern Pacific (Texas and New Orleans Railroad) | 3 | 105–107 | |
| | Tennessee Coal, Iron and Railroad Company | 8 | 1200–1207 | |
| | Tennessee Valley Authority | 4 | 1–3, 200 | |
| | Terminal Railroad Association of St. Louis | 4 | 1250–1253 | |
| | United States Air Force | 2 | 1841–1842 | |
| | United States Army | 1 | 65-11391 | |
| | United States Navy | 13 | 65-00292–65-00294, 65-365–65-00374 | |
| | U.S. Steel, Geneva Steel Works | 3 | 33–35 | |
| | U.S. Steel, Homestead Steel Works | 1 | GE1 | |
| | U.S. Steel, Morrisville, Pennsylvania Works | 9 | GE2–GE8, GE17–GE18 | |
| | Wabash Railroad | 5 | 305–309 | |
| | Total | 451 | | |

== Surviving units ==
Many S-12s survive today, both in revenue service and at museums and tourist operations.

=== Revenue Service ===
- SMS Lines owns 9 S-12's and operates #301 at the Penn Warner industrial park in Morrisville, Pennsylvania, as well as #304 on the Woodstown Central in Salem County, New Jersey. 7 others are in storage or awaiting restoration.
- The US Navy operates two S-12's (nos. 65-00367 and 65-00368) at Naval Weapons Station Earle in Monmouth County, New Jersey

=== Preservation ===
- Baldwin Locomotive Works #1200 is preserved at the Railroad Museum of Pennsylvania in Strasburg, Pennsylvania.
- Erie Mining #7243 is preserved at the Lake Superior Railroad Museum in Duluth, Minnesota.
- Nevada Northern #802 is stored at the Nevada Northern Railway Museum in Ely, Nevada. It was built in 1952 by Baldwin-Lima-Hamilton for New York Central as #9313, becoming Penn Central #8097. It was sold to Kennecott Copper Corporation in 1969 and used as a switcher at the McGill smelter as #802 and later donated to the museum.
- Patapsco & Back Rivers #335 (converted from a DS-4-4-1000) is preserved as Amherst Industries #99 at the Whitewater Valley Railroad in Connersville, Indiana.
- Patapsco & Back Rivers #346 is preserved at the Whitewater Valley Railroad in Connersville, Indiana.
- Southern Pacific #1550 is stored awaiting restoration at the Southern California Railway Museum in Perris, California.
