= Baldwin VO-660 =

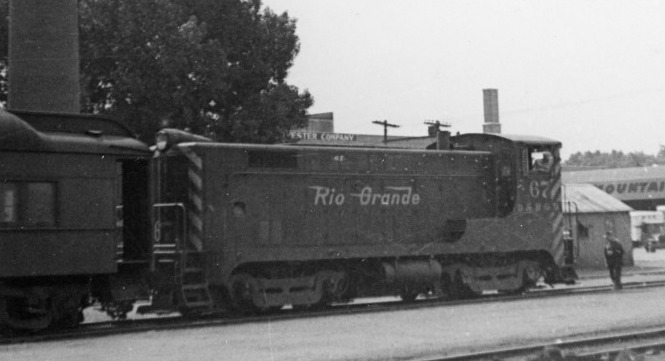
- D&RGW VO-660 switcher locomotive.
Type and origin
- Power type: Diesel-electric
- Builder: Baldwin Locomotive Works
- Model: VO-660
- Build date: April 1939 – May 1946
- Total produced: 143
Specifications
- Configuration
  - AAR: B-B
- Gauge: 4 ft 8 1/2 in (1,435 mm) standard gauge
- Length: 48 ft 0 in (14.63 m)
- Loco weight: 197,520–203,980 lb (89,600–92,500 kg)
- Prime mover: De La Verne VO
- RPM range: 625 rpm max.
- Engine type: Straight-6 Four-stroke diesel
- Aspiration: Normally aspirated, solid fuel injection
- Displacement: 1,979 cu in (32.43 L) per cylinder 11,874 cu in (194.58 L) total
- Generator: DC generator
- Traction motors: DC traction motors
- Cylinders: 6
- Cylinder size: 12.75 in × 15.5 in (324 mm × 394 mm)
- Transmission: Electric
- Loco brake: Straight air
- Train brakes: Air
Performance figures
- Power output: 660 hp (490 kW)
- Tractive effort: 49,380–50,995 lbf (219.65–226.84 kN)
Career
- Locale: North America, Cuba

The Baldwin VO-660 was a diesel-electric switcher locomotive built by Baldwin Locomotive Works between April, 1939 and May, 1946. The 197,520–203,980 lb (89,600–92,500 kg) units were powered by a six-cylinder diesel engine rated at 660 horsepower (492 kW), and rode on two-axle AAR Type-A switcher trucks in a B-B wheel arrangement. 142 examples of this model were built for American railroads, along with the United States Navy. Baldwin replaced the VO-660 with the model DS-4-4-660 in 1946.

In the early 1960s the Reading Company sent all 10 of their VO-660s to General Motors Electro-Motive Division to have them rebuilt to SW900 specifications. These locomotives received new frames, cabs, and carbodies, and reused only the trucks and batteries from the VO-660's.

== Units produced ==
Image	Railroad	Quantity	Road numbers	Notes
	Baldwin Locomotive Works (pre-production units)	1	299	Used as BLW plant switcher
	Baldwin Locomotive Works (pre-production units)	1	62300	to Reading 60
	Baldwin Locomotive Works (demonstrator)	1	335	first production VO-660; to Standard Steel Division of Baldwin Locomotive Works 12, to Altoona Railroaders Museum, to SMS Rail Lines, under restoration to active service
	Baldwin Locomotive Works (demonstrator)	1	336	to Elgin, Joliet and Eastern 270
	Baldwin Locomotive Works (demonstrator)	1	337	to Central of Georgia Railway
	Akron and Barberton Belt Railroad	1	25	
	American Smelting and Refining Company (ASARCO)	4	1950–1953	
	American Steel and Wire Company	3	1, 11, 23-1	
	Basic Magnesium, Inc.	1	1000	
	Central Railroad of New Jersey	4	1040–1043	
	Chicago and Eastern Illinois Railroad	1	110	
	Chicago and North Western Railway	10	1237–1246	
	Chicago, Milwaukee, St. Paul and Pacific Railroad (“Milwaukee Road”)	1	1649	Renumbered 1635, later renumbered 985
	Chicago, St. Paul, Minneapolis and Omaha Railway (“Omaha Road”)	3	58, 59, 68	
	Denver and Rio Grande Western Railroad	9	66–74	
	Elgin, Joliet and Eastern Railway	2	271, 272	
	Francisco Sugar Company, (Cuba)	1	45	
	Iowa Ordnance Plant	1	2-100	to US War Dept 7276
	Kansas City Southern Railway	1	1150	
	La Salle and Bureau County Railroad	1	6	
	Long Island Rail Road	1	403	
	Louisville and Nashville Railroad	4	20–23	
	Minneapolis, Northfield and Southern Railway	1	600	Renumbered 60
	Minnesota Western Railway	1	1	to MNS 1
	Missouri Pacific Railroad	4	9009, 9010, 9012, 9026	
	Nashville, Chattanooga and St. Louis Railway	1	10	
	New Orleans Public Belt Railroad	3	41–43	
	New York Central Railroad	12	501–502, 752–761	501–502 renumbered 750–751
	Northern Pacific Railway	3	128–130	Renumbered 650–652
	Patapsco and Back Rivers Railroad	3	63–65	Renumbered 301–303
	Pennsylvania Railroad	12	5907–5909, 5932–5937, 5941–5943	
	Procter and Gamble	1	125	Used at Port Ivory, Staten Island, NY
	Reading Company	10	61–70	
	St. Louis-San Francisco Railway	2	600–601	
	Seaboard Air Line Railroad	1	1202	
	Singer Manufacturing Company	1	2	To Pickens #2
	Southern Pacific Company	2	1021–1022	
	Southern Railway	1	DS2005	
	Terminal Railroad Association of St. Louis	4	531–534	
	Union Terminal Railway of Memphis (Missouri Pacific Railroad)	2	9090–9091	
	United States Navy	6	10, 11, 15, 16, 18, 31	
	Upper Merion and Plymouth Railroad	2	51–52	
	Wabash Railroad	1	200	
	Warner Company	1	11	to New Hope & Ivyland 395, to SMS Rail Lines 11; under restoration
	Western Maryland Railway	4	101, 103–105	
	Westinghouse Electric and Manufacturing Company	1	10	
	Wyandotte Terminal Railroad	3	101–103	
	Youngstown Sheet and Tube	8	600–607	
	Total	143		

== Surviving Units ==
Only four intact examples of the VO-660 are known to survive today.

• Baldwin 335, the first production VO-660, is owned by SMS Lines and is under restoration to active service.

• Singer Manufacturing #2 is preserved as Pickens #2 at the AnMed Health Cannon Marketplace Pavillion in Pickens, South Carolina.

• Warner #11 is owned by SMS Lines and is under restoration to active service.

• Wyandotte Terminal 103 is preserved at the Illinois Railway Museum in Union, Illinois.
