= Gulf Coast Rebel =

Passenger train

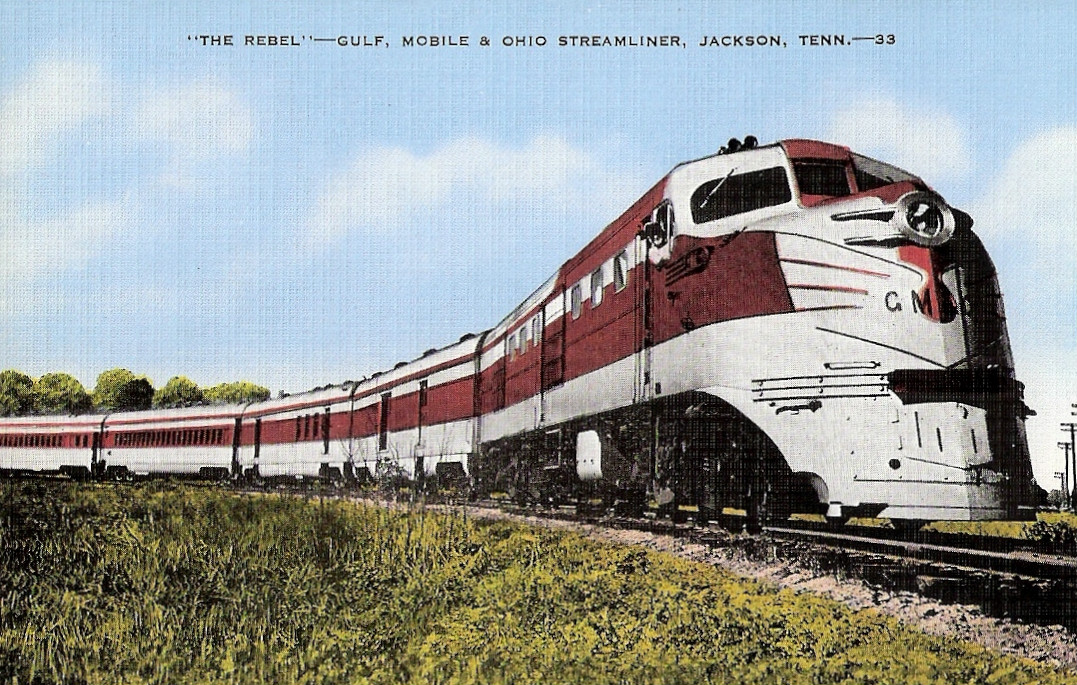
- The Gulf Coast Rebel as it appeared in the pre-Alton acquisition era with silver-and-red paint. An ALCO DL-105 is on the front.

Overview
- Service type: Inter-city rail
- Status: Discontinued
- Locale: Southeastern United States
- First service: October 29, 1940
- Last service: October 14, 1958
- Former operator: Gulf, Mobile and Ohio Railroad

Route
- Termini: St. Louis, Missouri; Mobile, Alabama
- Distance travelled: 648 miles (1,043 km)
- Service frequency: Daily
- Train numbers: 15 (southbound), 16 (northbound)

On-board services
- Seating arrangements: Reclining seat coaches
- Sleeping arrangements: Pullman sleeping cars
- Catering facilities: Lounge dining car

The Gulf Coast Rebel was a streamlined passenger train operated by the Gulf, Mobile and Ohio Railroad (GM&O) between St. Louis, Missouri and Mobile, Alabama. It operated from 1940 to 1958. Unlike the similarly named Rebels, the Gulf Coast Rebel used conventional locomotive-pulled equipment. The train was the last GM&O service south of St. Louis, Missouri when it was discontinued in 1958.

== History ==
In 1935, the Gulf, Mobile and Northern Railroad (GM&N), a predecessor of the GM&O, introduced the Rebel between New Orleans, Louisiana and Jackson, Tennessee. It was the first lightweight streamliner in the Southern United States. In the fashion of mid-1930s streamliners each consist was built as a cohesive set with streamlined power car, although the cars were not articulated. Even before its merger with the Mobile and Ohio Railroad in September 1940 the GM&N had begun assembling equipment for a new Rebel.

The new Gulf Coast Rebel began operation on October 29, 1940, using streamlined heavyweight cars. New ALCO DL-105 diesel locomotives pulled the train which gained the nickname "Big Rebel", differentiating it from the "Little Rebels" which remained in service. The new train was painted in the same red-and-silver paint scheme as the Little Rebels and included hostess service, another innovation from the original service. The trains operated on an overnight schedule between St. Louis and Mobile, using the former M&O main line via Meridian, Mississippi.

The GM&O's merger with the Alton Railroad in 1947 brought several changes to the Gulf Coast Rebel. The most obvious was the change in appearance as the train received the Alton's maroon-and-red paint scheme. In addition, the train received new lightweight cars built by American Car and Foundry. Both the Little and Big Rebels were the victim of the worsening passenger market in the 1950s. The GM&O discontinued the original Rebels in 1954 and the Gulf Coast Rebel, its last passenger train south of St. Louis, on October 14, 1958.

== Equipment ==
The original Gulf Coast Rebel used a heavyweight consist which received some streamlining and other cosmetic enhancements. Two consists were necessary to protect the service. Each had a mail car, baggage car, coach, buffet-coach, and sleeping car (Tower-series 8-section 1-drawing room 3-double bedroom cars Show Me and Deep South). As mentioned above, American Car and Foundry delivered new lightweight cars to the GM&O in 1947–1948 which were used throughout the system. These included 68-seat coaches, 31-seat parlor cars, and four 4-section 8-roomette 1-compartment 3-double bedroom sleeping cars. Originally ALCO DL-105s (styled by Otto Kuhler) handled the Gulf Coast Rebel. Later motive power included the ALCO PA-1 and the uncommon Baldwin DR-6.
