= Baldwin DR-6 =

Family of passenger diesel locomotives

DRX-6-4-2000
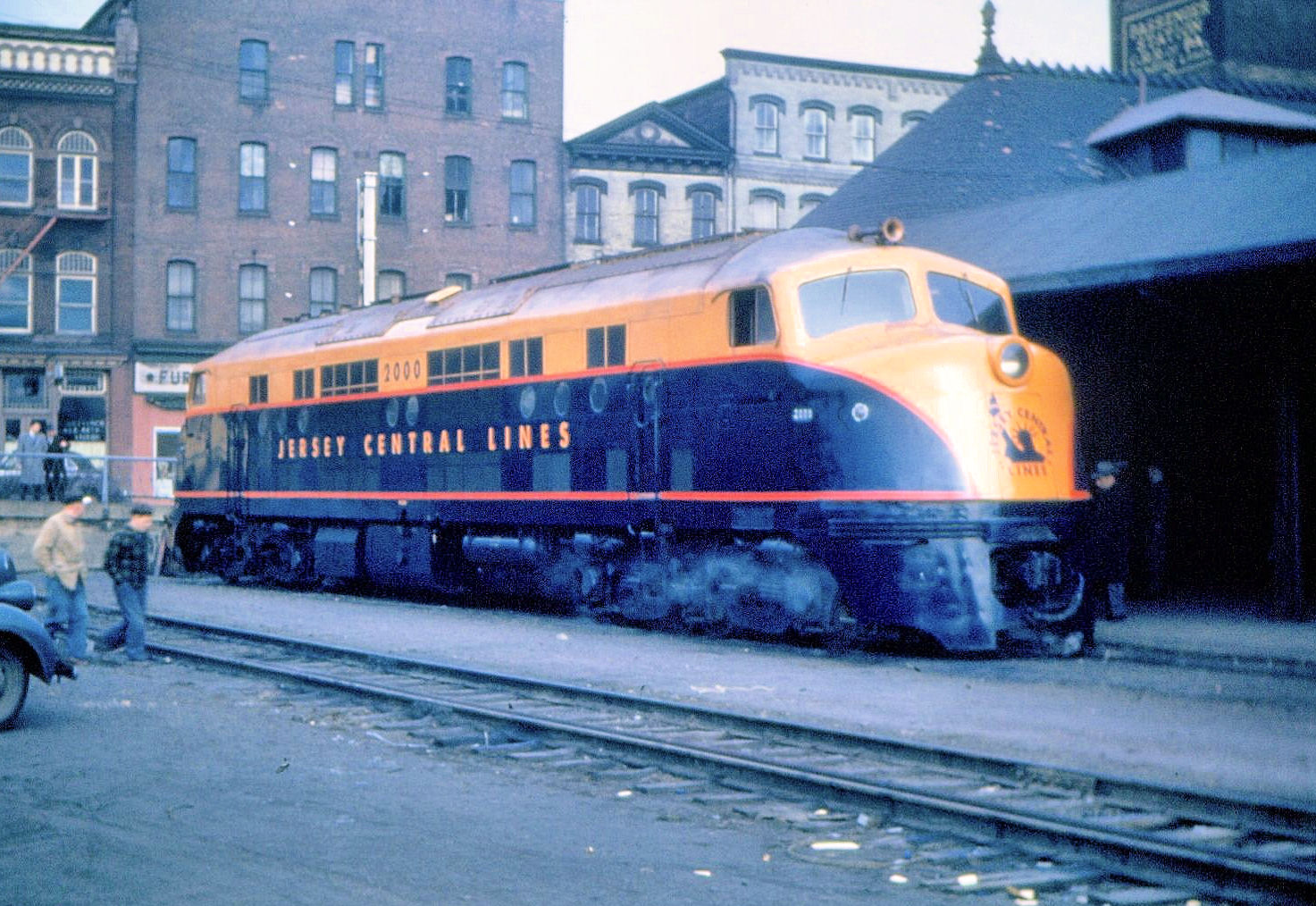
- CNJ (W&N) 2000, the first of six "Double-enders" DRX-6-4-2000 locomotives
Type and origin
- Power type: Diesel-electric
- Builder: Baldwin
- Model: DR-6-4-2000, DR-6-4-2000, DR-6-2-1000, DR-6-4-1500
- Build date: January 1945 to December 1948
- Total produced: 39
Specifications
- Configuration
  - AAR: A1A-A1A and A1A-3
- Gauge: 4 ft 8 1/2 in (1,435 mm)
- Trucks: GSC Trimount, GSC Commonwealth
- Wheel diameter: 42 in (1,100 mm)
- Wheelbase
  - Truck: 15 ft 6 in (4.72 m), 13 ft (4.0 m) for DR-6-4-1500
- Length
  - Over body: 80 ft (24 m), 61 ft (19 m) for DR-6-4-1500
- Prime mover: Inline-8 8VO, Inline-8 608NA, Inline-6 606SC
- Generator: Westinghouse 480B (demonstrators) Westinghouse 480D (all other models)
- Traction motors: Westinghouse 370B (4, demonstrators) Westinghouse 370F (4, all other models)
- Gear ratio: 21:58 (all models)
- Couplers: AAR Type E knuckle
Career
- Operators: Central Railroad of New Jersey, Gulf, Mobile and Ohio, Chicago and North Western, Pennsylvania Railroad, New York Central, Seaboard Air Line, National Railways of Mexico
- Class: PRR- BP20, NYC- DCA-2a/DCB-2a, NdeM- DE-8, CNJ- PD-30
- Nicknames: Babyface, sharknose, double-ender, Jersey Janus
- Locale: United States and Mexico
- Disposition: All scrapped

Baldwin Locomotive Works produced several different Baldwin DR-6 models of 6-axle passenger train-hauling diesel locomotives between 1945 and 1948. The series comprised eight individual versions, all of which sold only in small numbers; across all versions, only 39 locomotives were produced. Each version was produced only for a single railroad. Many shared the same Baldwin model number, DR-6-4-2000, even though they were rather different; this was because the Baldwin model only encoded the total axles (6), the driven axles (4) and the power output (2,000 hp or 1,500 kW). The single exception was the single unit produced for the Chicago and North Western Railway, which had a single 1,000 hp (750 kW) engine and was model number DR-6-2-1000. In the AAR wheel arrangement scheme of classification, these locomotives were of A1A-A1A and A1A-3 arrangements, respectively.

== Baldwin demonstrators ==
The first produced version comprised a pair of DR-6-4-2000 demonstrators built in 1945. This, unlike later models, used Baldwin's Inline-8 8VO engine model. These locomotives had a unique cab that featured the same upright, aggressive prow as the 30 Baldwin 0-6-6-0-1000/1DE C-C units built on a U.S. Army order in June 1945 for shipment to the Soviet Railways as part of a Lend-Lease. They emerged as Baldwin #2000 and #2001, with #2000 built in January and #2001 built in March. After demonstrating on the Illinois Central, Chicago and Eastern Illinois, Union Pacific, and several other railroads, they were sold to Ferrocarriles Nacionales de México (NdeM) in August 1945 and assigned road #6000 and #6001. Both were scrapped in September 1957.

== 608NA-engined DR-6-4-2000 locomotives ==
Three different railroads ordered the DR-6-4-2000 model with the 608NA 8-cylinder naturally aspirated engine, but in visually different forms.

=== CNJ locomotives ===
The Central Railroad of New Jersey ordered six DRX-6-4-2000 locomotives for its then-subsidiary Wharton and Northern, #2000–#2005, which were unusual for North American diesel locomotives in that they had driving cabs at both ends. The first three #2000-2002 had the cab doors on the same level as the locomotive frame and were delivered with an orange roof. The last three had their doors on the cab floor level and were delivered with a dark blue roof. On the CNJ they were known as "Double-enders". The cab style was nicknamed "Babyface" and was used by several other Baldwin models. The original paint scheme was a deep, rich blue on the lower part of the locomotive and tangerine on the upper part. Almost all were retired around 1962–63, but #2004 was kept as a stationary heater in Jersey City until mid-1968.

=== GM&O locomotives ===
The Gulf, Mobile and Ohio Railroad ordered two locomotives in 1947, road #280 and #281, with #280 built in January and #281 in February. These were delivered in a single-ended "babyface" carbody. They mostly pulled the Gulf Coast Rebel streamlined train from St. Louis, Missouri to Mobile, Alabama as a pair. Both were retired in October 1958 and scrapped in June 1965.

=== NdeM locomotive ===
The Ferrocarriles Nacionales de México ordered one additional DR-6-4-2000 unit in August 1946 after purchasing the two demonstrators. This was assigned road #6002 and had nearly identical styling to the demonstrators, but used two 608NA engines instead of their VO power plants. It was scrapped in September 1957.

== 606SC-engined DR-6-4-2000 locomotives ==
These were produced exclusively for the Pennsylvania Railroad and were delivered in 1948 in the sharknose body style designed by Raymond Loewy, as diesel running mates to the T1 steam locomotive; also built by Baldwin and similarly styled by Loewy. Eighteen A units and nine B units were produced, producing nine three-unit locomotive sets of 6,000 horsepower (4,500 kW). The PRR classified them as BP-20 (Baldwin Passenger, 2,000 horsepower or 1,500 kilowatts). They were originally used on top-flight express trains such as the Broadway Limited, but problems soon relegated them to lesser service. They ended their days on commuter trains along the New York and Long Branch in New Jersey. A small number were de-rated for use in freight service (re-classified as BF16z).

== DR-6-2-1000 ==
A single DR-6-2-1000 locomotive of A1A-3 wheel arrangement was produced for the Chicago and North Western Railway in November 1948 and assigned road #5000A. This contained only a single Inline-6 606SC engine of 1,000 horsepower (750 kW); the rear engine compartment was replaced by a baggage compartment as it hauled mostly local trains. It was retired in January 1958. Other locomotive units like this included the Chicago, Rock Island and Pacific Railroad's EMC AB6 in their original form.

== 608SC-engined DR-6-4-1500 locomotives ==
Baldwin also built “Babyface” A1A-A1A units with a single 608SC engine of 1,500 horsepower (1.12 MW). Seven cab-equipped locomotives were built—four for the New York Central Railroad (#3200–3203), and three for the Seaboard Air Line Railroad (#2700–2702). Two cabless boosters were also built, both for the New York Central (#3210–3211). The New York Central units rode the same long wheelbase General Steel Casting Trimount trucks as the larger units (and various ALCO passenger units), an excellent high-speed truck, although they originally had GSC Commonwealth, but were re-trucked in early 1948. Seaboard chose less stable Commonwealth trucks which took up less room under the frame. All were scrapped.
