= Baldwin DRS-6-4-750 =

Type and origin
- Power type: Diesel-electric
- Builder: Baldwin Locomotive Works
- Model: DRS-6-4-750
- Build date: 1949
- Total produced: 1
Specifications
- Configuration
  - AAR: A1A-A1A
  - UIC: (A1A)(A1A)
- Gauge: 1,435 mm (4 ft 8 1/2 in)
- Prime mover: 606NA
- Aspiration: Naturally aspirated
- Generator: DC generator
- Traction motors: DC traction motors
- Cylinders: 6
- Transmission: Electric
- Loco brake: Straight air
- Train brakes: Air
Performance figures
- Power output: 750 hp (559 kW)
Career
- Locale: Morocco

The Baldwin DRS-6-4-750 is a diesel-electric locomotive built by Baldwin Locomotive Works in 1949. The DRS-6-4-750 was powered by a naturally aspirated six-cylinder diesel engine rated at 750 horsepower (559 kW), and rode on a pair of three-axle trucks in an A1A-A1A wheel arrangement. The only model ever produced was built for the Office Chérifien des Phosphates (OCP) Railroad in Morocco.

== Name designation ==
DRS - Diesel Road Switcher
6 - Six axles
4 - Four powered axles
750 - 750 horsepower

== Original buyers ==
Railroad	Quantity	Road numbers	Notes
Office Chérifien des Phosphates (OCP)	1	6	Used in Khouribga network
Totals	1		
