= Baldwin DRS-6-4-1000 =

Diesel-electric locomotive

Type and origin
- Power type: Diesel-electric
- Builder: Baldwin Locomotive Works
- Model: DRS-6-4-1000
- Build date: 1948 - 1949
- Total produced: 20
Specifications
- Configuration
  - AAR: A1A-A1A
  - UIC: (A1A)(A1A)
- Prime mover: 606SC
- Aspiration: Turbo
- Generator: DC generator
- Traction motors: DC traction motors
- Cylinders: 6
- Transmission: Electric
- Loco brake: Straight air
- Train brakes: Air
Performance figures
- Power output: 1,000 hp (746 kW)
Career
- Locale: Algeria

The Baldwin DRS-6-4-1000 is a diesel-electric locomotive built by Baldwin Locomotive Works between 1948 and 1949. The DRS-6-4-1000s were powered by a turbo-charged six-cylinder diesel engine rated at 1,000 horsepower (746 kW), and rode on a pair of three-axle trucks in an A1A-A1A wheel arrangement. 20 of these models were built for a railroad in Algeria.

== Name designation ==
DRS - Diesel Road Switcher
6 - Six axles
4 - Four powered axles
1000 - 1,000 horsepower

== Original buyers ==
Railroad	Quantity	Road numbers	Notes
Algeria FSC	20	040-DC-1 to 040-DC-20	French Supply Council
Totals	20		
