= Wyandotte Terminal Railroad =

Wyandotte Terminal Railroad was incorporated in the State of Michigan, United States of America, on September 14, 1904. It ceased operations as a railroad in 1982.

== History ==
Wyandotte Terminal Railroad was originally created and owned by Michigan Alkali, a producer of an ingredient in the making of soda ash and other sodium-based products, to provide railroad switching services to its two plants located about four miles from each other on the Detroit River in Wyandotte, Michigan, United States of America. Michigan Alkali was later named Wyandotte Chemical and eventually BASF Wyandotte Corporation. It operated a "nine mile terminal railroad that connected with the Michigan Central, the New York Central, Detroit, Toledo and Ironton, and the Wyandotte Southern Railroads."

== Operations ==
At one time owning almost 9 miles of track, Wyandotte Terminal Railroad did all the intra-plant and inter-plant railroad switching for BASF Wyandotte’s two large plants located on the Detroit River in Wyandotte, Michigan. The City of Wyandotte is located just south of the City of Detroit. Wyandotte Terminal Railroad interchanging freight cars with two Class 1 railroads, the Michigan Central Railroad (later known as New York Central, Penn Central Railroad and, eventually, Conrail) and the Detroit, Toledo and Ironton Railroad, as well as neighboring industrial railroad named Wyandotte Southern Railroad.

During the last few years of operations, Wyandotte Terminal Railroad would operate a train six days a week from BASF Wyandotte Chemical’s South Plant to its North Plant. Leaving the South Plant, this train would run on about a mile of its own trackage to the Detroit Toledo & Ironton Railroad’s (“DT&I”) Ford Yard located at the extreme south end of the City of Wyandotte, near Pennsylvania Rd. and Center St., to interchange freight cars with DT&I and Wyandotte Southern Railroad. From Ford Yard the train would then run north approximately four miles with freight cars destined for the North Plant of BASF Wyandotte Corporation utilizing trackage rights on the DT&I line. Just west of the North Plant the train would regain Wyandotte Terminal Railroad trackage and proceed about a half-mile to the North Plant. When finished switching at the North Plant, this train would return to the South Plant via the same route, again interchanging freight cars received from the North Plant with DT&I at Ford Yard, if necessary. Wyandotte Terminal Railroad interchanged with Conrail at its North Plant. Wyandotte Terminal Railroad kept additional locomotives at each of its two plants to perform the intra-plant switching. Freight cars handled by the Wyandotte Terminal Railroad were largely tank cars and covered hoppers.

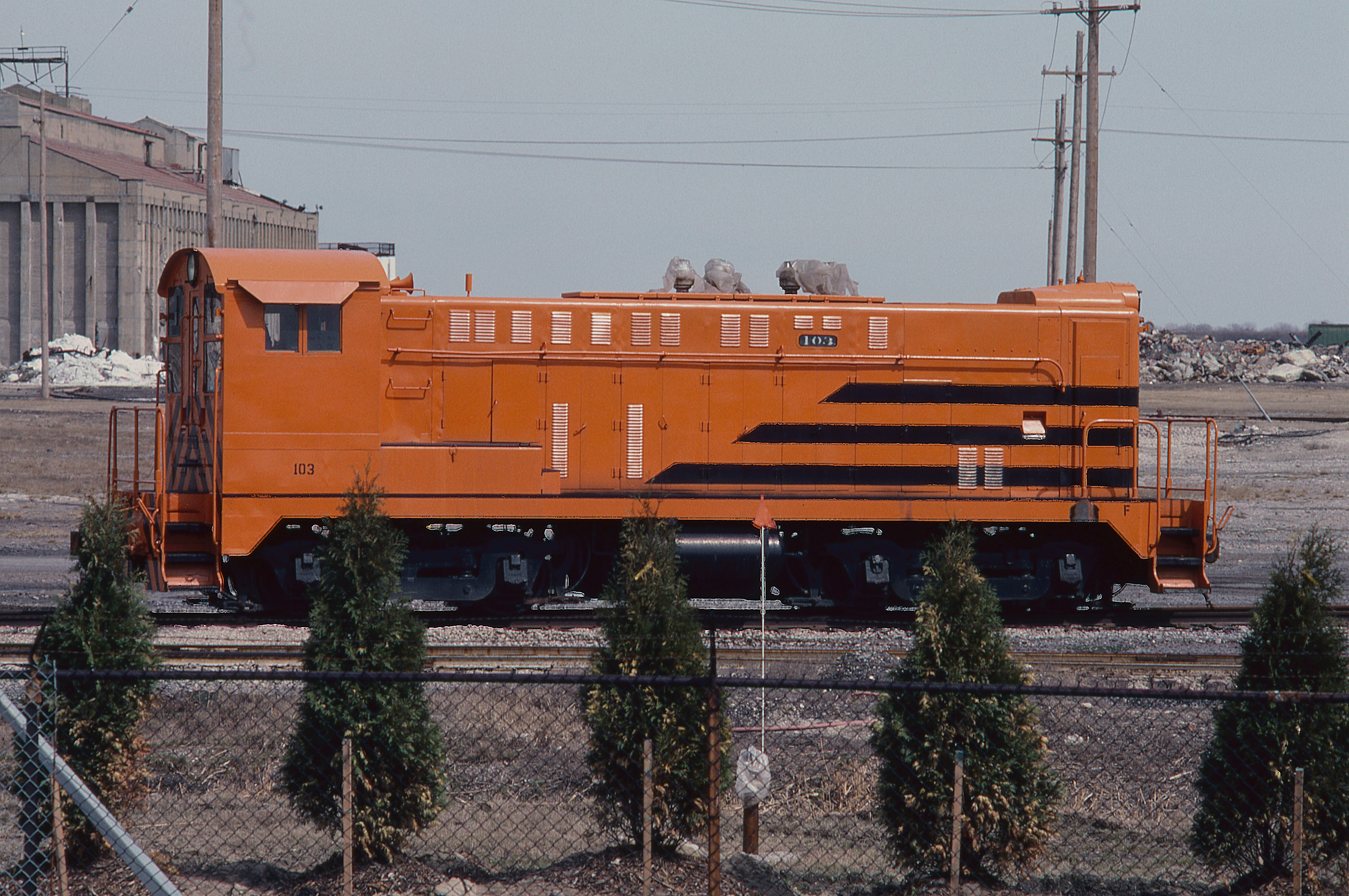
Wyandotte Terminal RR Baldwin VO 660 103 at BASF Wyandotte North Plant August 5, 1978

== Locomotives ==
In 1945, Wyandotte Terminal Railroad’s replaced its fleet of steam switcher-type locomotives with three Baldwin Locomotive model VO 660 diesel-electric switchers, nos. 101 through 103. It purchased a fourth new Baldwin switcher, model DS 4-4-660 no. 104, in January 1949. All were painted in a green with yellow striping paint scheme. At some point a fifth diesel locomotive switcher, a General Electric 65 –tonner, was obtained from its parent, Michigan Alkali.

In 1975, Wyandotte Terminal purchased two used American Locomotive diesel-electric switcher-type locomotives to replace Baldwin switchers nos. 102 and 104 that were out of service. One of these was an ex-Baltimore & Ohio Railroad Alco model S-2 (numbered WTR 106) and the other was an ex-Nickel Plate Railroad Alco model S-4 (numbered WTR 107). Around this time Wyandotte Terminal Railroad began to repaint its locomotives in an orange with black striping paint scheme.

Wyandotte Terminal Railroad’s Baldwin diesel-electric locomotives have all been scrapped except for no. 103, which is now in the collection of the Illinois Railway Museum in Union, Illinois.

== The End of Wyandotte Terminal Railroad ==
Though BASF Wyandotte Corporation was still operating its two plants in the City of Wyandotte, Michigan, it decided to discontinue using the Wyandotte Terminal Railroad for its railroad switching needs in 1982 and, instead, entered into contracts with the two connecting Class 1 railroads, Conrail and Detroit, Toledo & Ironton Railroad, for the switching of its two plants. Wyandotte Terminal Railroad filed papers in the State of Michigan to legally dissolve its corporate existence on March 28, 1983.
