= Patapsco and Back Rivers Railroad =

Class III switching and terminal railroad

Patapsco & Back Rivers Railroad
Overview
- Headquarters: Sparrows Point, MD
- Reporting mark: PBR
- Locale: Baltimore County, Maryland
- Dates of operation: 1918–2012
- Predecessor: Baltimore & Sparrows Point Railroad Co.
- Successor: The Baltimore Industrial Railroad

Technical
- Track gauge: 4 ft 8 1/2 in (1,435 mm) standard gauge
- Length: approx. 100 mi. secondary

Other
- Website: http://sparrowspoint.com/

The Patapsco and Back Rivers Railroad (reporting mark PBR) was a Class III switching and terminal railroad, operating in Baltimore County. Owned for the majority of its existence by the Bethlehem Steel Corporation, the railroad primarily served Bethlehem Steel's Sparrows Point Terminal area. MCM Management Corporation purchased the PBR, through their purchase of RG Steel corporation, and renamed the railroad the Baltimore Industrial Railroad (reporting mark BDR) in 2012. RG Steel, LLC

== History ==
Built as the standard gauge Baltimore & Sparrows Point Railroad Co., the first track was constructed from Colgate Creek to Penwood Park in Sparrows Point, a distance of 5.46 miles (8.79 km) in 1889.

The Patapsco & Back Rivers Railroad, was incorporated by the Bethlehem Steel Corporation in 1916 to perform switching operations around their expanding steel mill and shipbuilding operations at Sparrows Point. The railroad takes its name from the rivers surrounding the point.

The PBR interchanged with the Pennsylvania Railroad at a location known as Gray's Station. This yard continued to be its connection through the years with the Pennsylvania's successors Penn Central, Conrail, and finally CSX and NS. The B&O and Western Maryland Railway also ran car floats of raw materials from their ports in the Baltimore Harbor to Sparrows Point that would be off loaded by the PBR.

The PBR owned primarily steam and later diesel switching locomotives, from various manufacturers such as Baldwin, ALCO, and EMD for moving cars in and out of Sparrows Point. The PBR also rostered a fleet of gondolas for delivering finished products from the plant.

The decline of the US steel market in the latter half of the twentieth-century caused a decline in traffic for the PBR as Bethlehem Steel shut down many of its operations at Sparrows Point. Steel making on the point would cease forever when the fourth successor to Bethlehem Steel, RG Steel went bankrupt in 2012 and the site was liquidated.

Much of the track from the PBR remains in place as the area, under development as Tradepoint Atlantic, awaits redevelopment and new tenants.

== Preserved Equipment ==
Locomotive number	Model	Type	Propulsion	Manufacturer	Location
PBR 331	VO-1000	Switcher	Diesel-electric	Baldwin Locomotive Works	B&O Railroad Museum
PBR 335	DS-4-4-1000	Switcher	Diesel-electric	Baldwin Locomotive Works	Whitewater Valley Railroad
PBR 346	S12	Switcher	Diesel-electric	Baldwin Locomotive Works	Whitewater Valley Railroad
