= Baldwin 0-6-6-0 1000 =

Diesel-electric locomotive built in 1945

Baldwin 0-6-6-0-1000/1DE СЖД Дб (SZhD Db)
Type and origin
- Power type: Diesel-electric
- Builder: Baldwin Locomotive Works
- Serial number: 72173-72202
- Model: 0-6-6-0-1000/1DE
- Build date: June-August 1945
- Total produced: 30
Specifications
- Configuration
  - AAR: C-C
  - UIC: C′C′
- Gauge: 1,524 mm (5 ft); 1,520 mm (4 ft 11 27/32 in) Russian gauge
- Trucks: GSC Commonwealth
- Wheelbase
  - Truck: 4.0 m (13 ft)
- Length: 17.7 m (58 ft)
- Height: 4.6 m (15 ft)
- Loco weight: 122.6 tonnes (120.7 long tons; 135.1 short tons)
- Prime mover: 8VO
- Engine type: Four-stroke diesel
- Aspiration: Normally aspirated
- Generator: Westinghouse 480D
- Traction motors: Westinghouse 370F (6)
- Cylinders: 8
- Transmission: Electric
- Gear ratio: 68:14
- Loco brake: Straight air
- Train brakes: Air
Performance figures
- Maximum speed: 97 km/h (60 mph)
- Power output: 746 kW (1,000 hp)
Career
- Operators: Soviet Railways (СЖД / SZhD)
- Class: Дб (Db)
- Numbers: Дб20-71 to Дб20-100 (Db20-71 to Db20-100)
- Locale: Soviet Union
- Withdrawn: 1981
- Disposition: All scrapped

The Baldwin 0-6-6-0-1000/1DE were cab unit diesel-electric locomotives built by Baldwin Locomotive Works in 1945. The 0-6-6-0-1000/1DEs were powered by an eight-cylinder diesel engine rated at 1,000 horsepower (746 kW), and rode on a pair of three-axle trucks in a C-C wheel arrangement. 30 of these models were built for Soviet Railways, today Russian Railways, as Class Д^{б} (Class Db).

All were scrapped except the cab of one unit that was used as a shed, and a bogie that was used for a fuel tanker.

== Original buyers ==
Railroad	Quantity	Road numbers	Notes
Soviet Railways	30	Д^{б}20-71 to Д^{б}20-100	former US Army 2460–2489
Totals	30		

== See also ==
- The Museum of the Moscow Railway, at Paveletsky Rail Terminal, Moscow
- Rizhsky Rail Terminal, Home of the Moscow Railway Museum
- Varshavsky Rail Terminal, Saint Petersburg, Home of the Central Museum of Railway Transport, Russian Federation
- History of rail transport in Russia
