= New Orleans Public Belt Railroad =

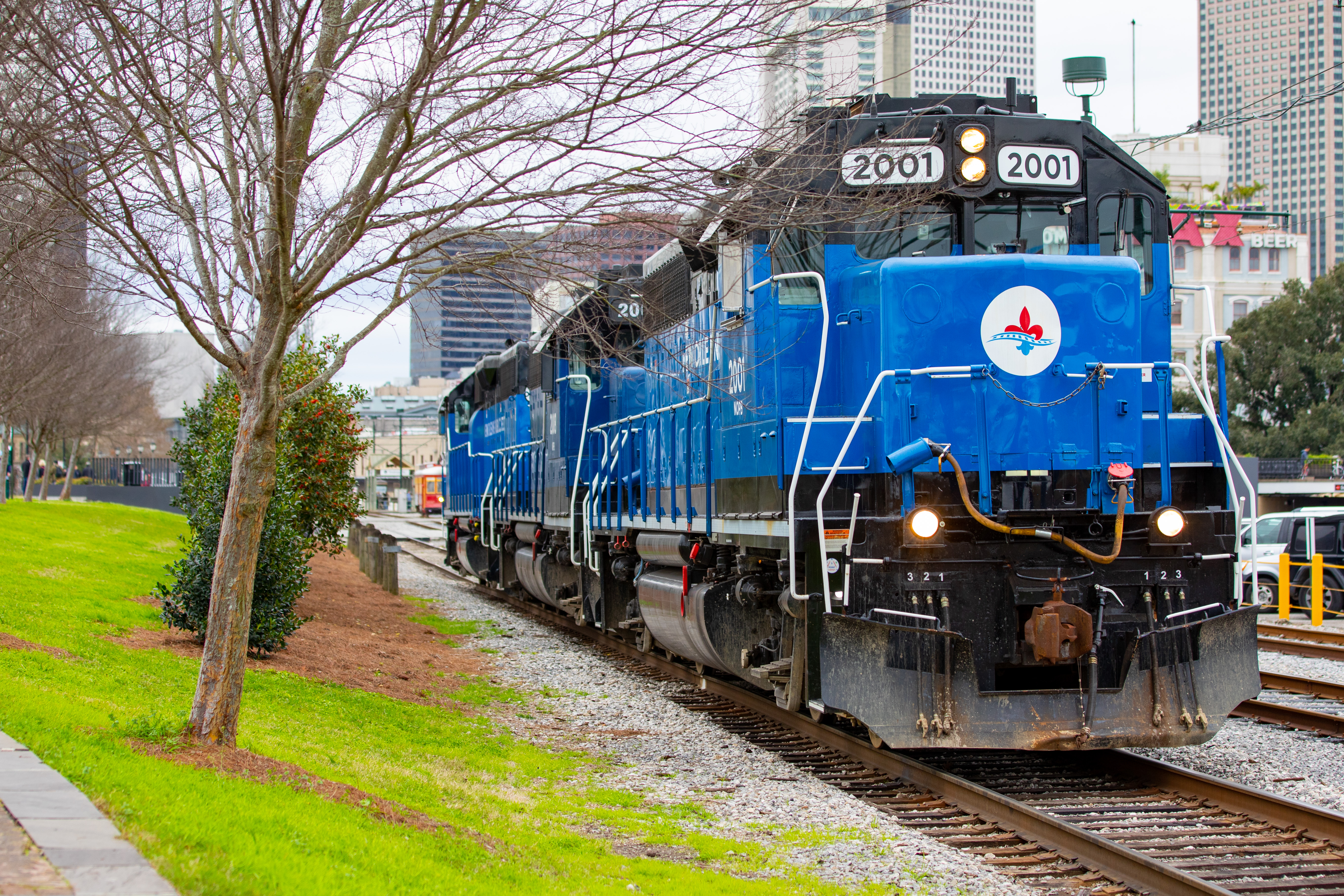
- NOPB EMD GP38-2 locomotives in 2023

Overview
- Fleet: 8 × EMD GP38-2
- Parent company: Port of New Orleans
- Headquarters: New Orleans, Louisiana
- Reporting mark: NOPB
- Locale: Port of New Orleans
- Dates of operation: 1908–present

Technical
- Track gauge: 4 ft 8 1/2 in (1,435 mm) standard gauge
- Length: 26 mi (42 km)
- Track length: 75 mi (121 km)

Other
- Website: railnola.com

The New Orleans Public Belt Railroad (reporting mark NOPB) is a Class III railroad and a subsidiary of the Port of New Orleans. The railroad provides switching and haulage services for freight traffic moving through the port and interchanges with all six of North America's Class I railroads. It operates 26 miles (42 km) of mainline track and 75 miles (121 km) of total track in the New Orleans area and maintains a fleet of eight locomotives. Operating and capital expenses are funded through operating revenue.

The railroad owns and jointly maintains the Huey P. Long Bridge across the Mississippi River with the Louisiana Department of Transportation and Development, which is responsible for maintaining the roadway. It is estimated that about one-third of the United States' east–west rail freight crosses the Mississippi River over the bridge.

The NOPB was developed by the City of New Orleans in the early 20th century to provide railroads with uniform and impartial access to the Port of New Orleans and to reduce congestion caused by multiple lines terminating along the riverfront. The line began operations in 1908. In 2018, the city transferred control of the railroad to the Port of New Orleans in exchange for the port transferring two wharves along the Mississippi River to the city.

== Operations ==
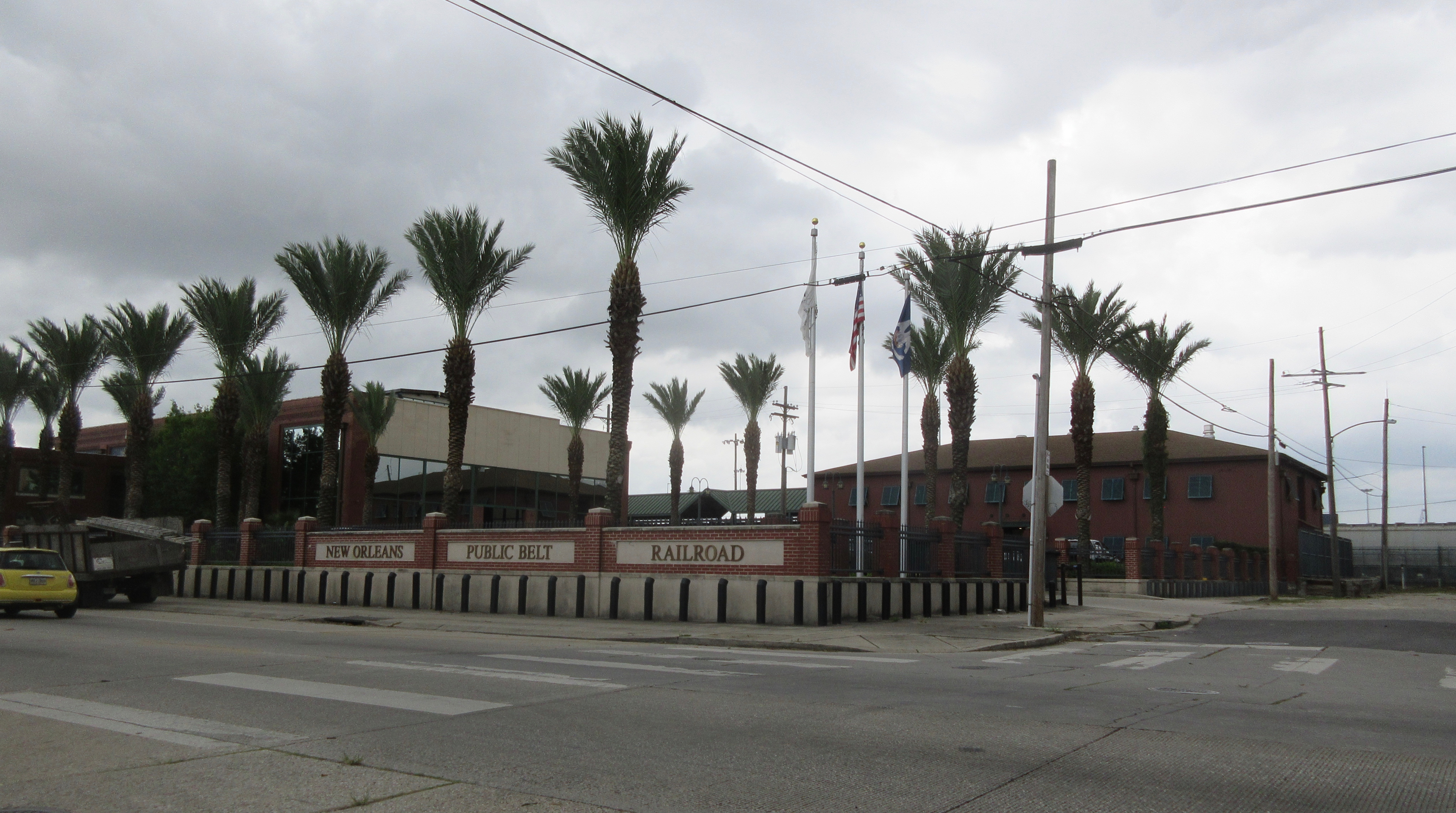
New Orleans Public Belt Railroad headquarters on Tchoupitoulas Street

The New Orleans Public Belt Railroad operates about 26 miles (42 km) of mainline track and approximately 75 miles (121 km) of total trackage serving the Port of New Orleans and surrounding industrial areas.

The railroad's primary classification facility, Cotton Warehouse Yard, is located in Uptown New Orleans near the company's headquarters. Other yards on the system include Claiborne Yard and France Yard, along with several storage yards including Pauline, Race Street, East Bridge, and South yards.

The railroad interchanges freight traffic with all six Class I railroads in North America: BNSF, Canadian National, Canadian Pacific Kansas City, CSX, Norfolk Southern, and Union Pacific.

The locomotive fleet consists of eight lower-emission (Tier 1) EMD GP38-2 locomotives rebuilt by Electro-Motive Diesel in 2020 and leased from GATX.

== History ==
=== Origins ===
Plans for a belt line railroad serving the waterfront of New Orleans were first discussed in 1890. Members of the city's Municipal Affairs Committee sought to improve rail access to the Port of New Orleans in order to encourage commercial development. At the time, several trunk railroads served different sections of the riverfront, and railcars were often transported across the Mississippi River by barge.

In 1896 the committee proposed the creation of the New Orleans Belt Railroad, to be owned and operated by the city. The railroad was intended to provide "uniform and impartial" rail service along the port and to facilitate freight movements between the railroads serving New Orleans.

The New Orleans Public Belt Railroad was formally established in 1900. A 1904 municipal ordinance placed operation of the railroad under a Board of Commissioners consisting of the mayor and sixteen appointed citizens. The ordinance also extended a city appropriation for the acquisition of property and construction of the railroad through 1915. Construction began in 1905, and the railroad began operations in 1908 with 20 miles (32 km) of track and a single locomotive.

=== Expansion ===
Construction of the joint rail and automobile Huey P. Long Bridge across the Mississippi River began in 1932, and the first train crossed the bridge in 1935, providing the railroad with a direct rail crossing of the river.

The railroad expanded its operations during the mid-20th century. In 1943 an interchange with the Texas and Pacific Railway (now part of Union Pacific Railroad) was constructed at West Bridge. In 1956 the railroad extended trackage to Lake Pontchartrain with the construction of France Yard and new lines along both sides of the Industrial Canal.

=== Modernization ===
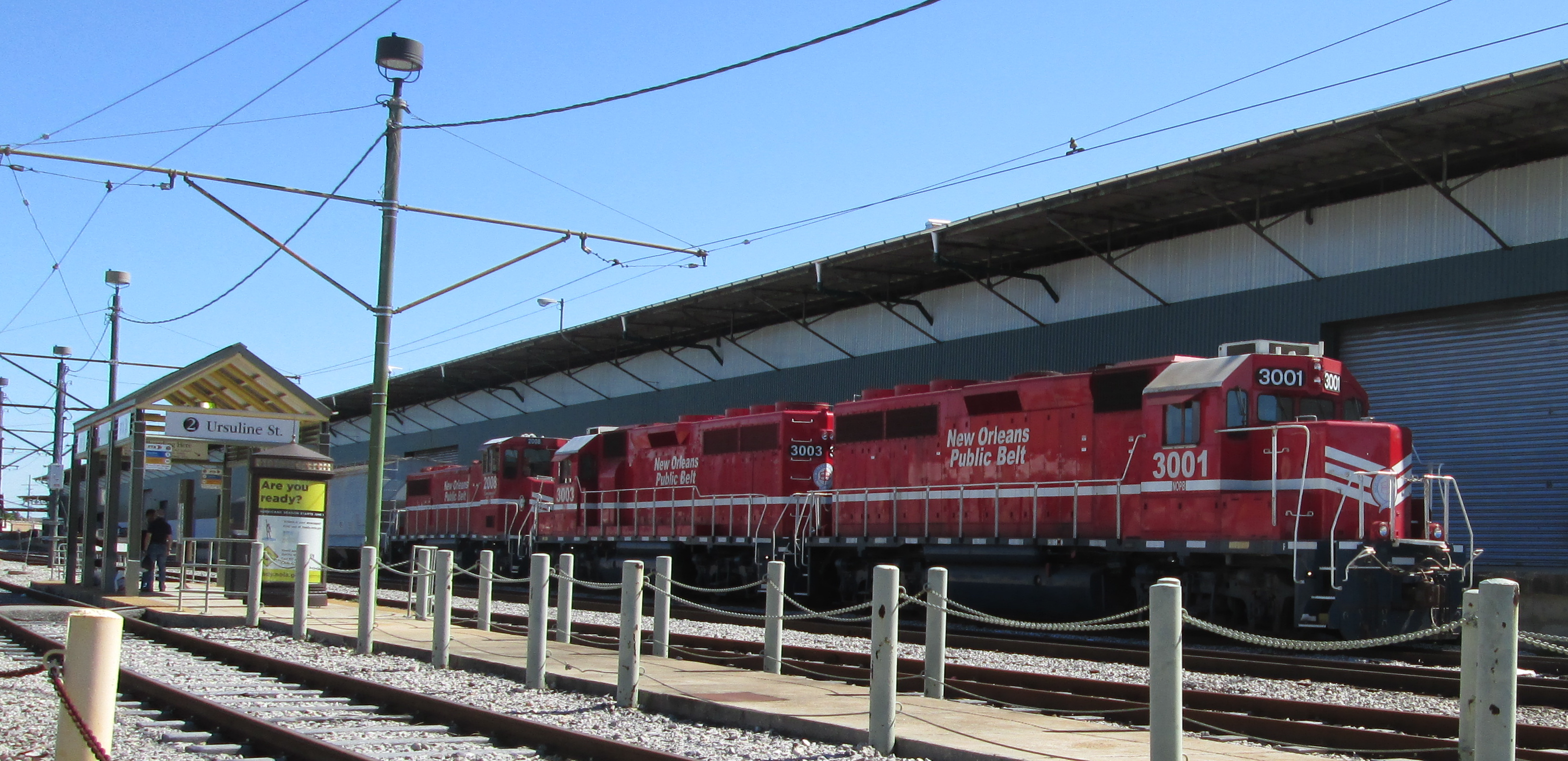
New Orleans Public Belt locomotive in the prior livery, 2013

A new headquarters building on Tchoupitoulas Street was completed in 1992. In 1997 the Louisiana Legislature authorized the railroad to transport freight across its network that did not originate or terminate on the line. The Cotton Warehouse Yard office and car repair facility opened in 1998 and improvements allowed double-stack container trains to access the main line in 1999.

Hurricane Katrina and Hurricane Rita in 2005 caused an estimated $450 million in damage to the railroad's equipment and track. About 70 percent of the railroad's lines and interchanges were back in operation by September 2005, and 90 percent by March 2006, when interchange operations with all six of its connecting Class I railroads had been restored. The railroad celebrated its centennial in 2008.

In 2016 the railroad established an interchange with Kansas City Southern Railway (now Canadian Pacific Kansas City) at Frellsen Junction in St. Charles Parish, marking the first time the railroad operated outside Orleans and Jefferson parishes.

=== Transfer to the Port of New Orleans ===
Beginning in 2015 the City of New Orleans explored selling the railroad to a private company to fund needed capital improvements. The proposal faced opposition from shippers who expressed concern about potential impacts on service. The city abandoned the privatization plan in 2016 but continued to consider alternatives for funding improvements.

In 2017 the Port of New Orleans, the City of New Orleans, and the New Orleans Public Belt Railroad reached an agreement to transfer control of the railroad to the port. In exchange, the port agreed to transfer the Governor Nicholls Street and Esplanade Avenue wharves to the city, which would use the space to expand the riverfront park. The transfer of the railroad to the Port of New Orleans was completed on February 1, 2018.

In 2020, the railroad purchased a fleet of eight lower-emission (Tier 1) GP40-2 locomotives rebuilt by Electro-Motive Diesel.

In 2022, Tomeka Watson Bryant became president and chief executive officer of the railroad, the first African American woman to lead a short line railroad in the United States.
