= Baldwin DS-4-4-1000 =

Diesel–electric switcher locomotives

Baldwin DS-4-4-1000-NA (608NA)
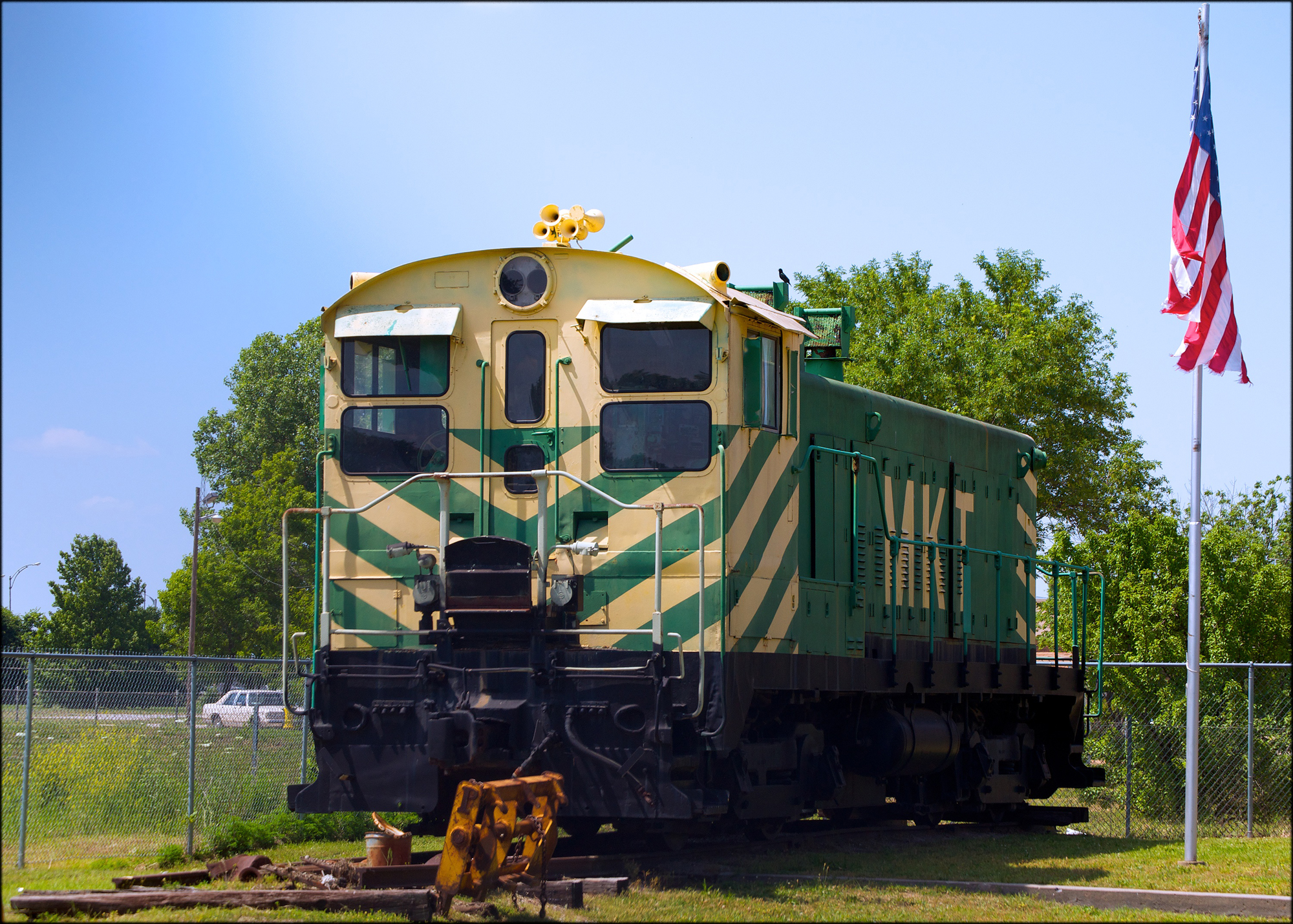
- Katy Railroad No.1006 Switcher parked in the back of a museum in Parsons, KS. The locomotive is a Baldwin DS-4-4-1000 (608NA)
Type and origin
- Power type: Diesel–electric
- Builder: Baldwin Locomotive Works
- Model: DS-4-4-1000 (608NA)
- Build date: June 1946 – January 1948
- Total produced: 56
Specifications
- Configuration
  - AAR: B-B
- Gauge: 4 ft 8 1/2 in (1,435 mm)
- Prime mover: Baldwin 608NA
- Engine type: Four-stroke diesel
- Aspiration: Normally aspirated, solid injection
- Displacement: 1,979 cu in (32.43 L) per cylinder 15,831 cu in (259.42 L) total
- Generator: DC generator
- Traction motors: DC traction motors
- Cylinders: Straight-8
- Cylinder size: 12 3/4 in × 15 1/2 in (324 mm × 394 mm)
- Transmission: Electric
- Loco brake: Air
- Train brakes: Air
Performance figures
- Power output: 1,000 hp (746 kW)
Career
- Locale: North America

Balwin DS-4-4-1000-SC (606SC)
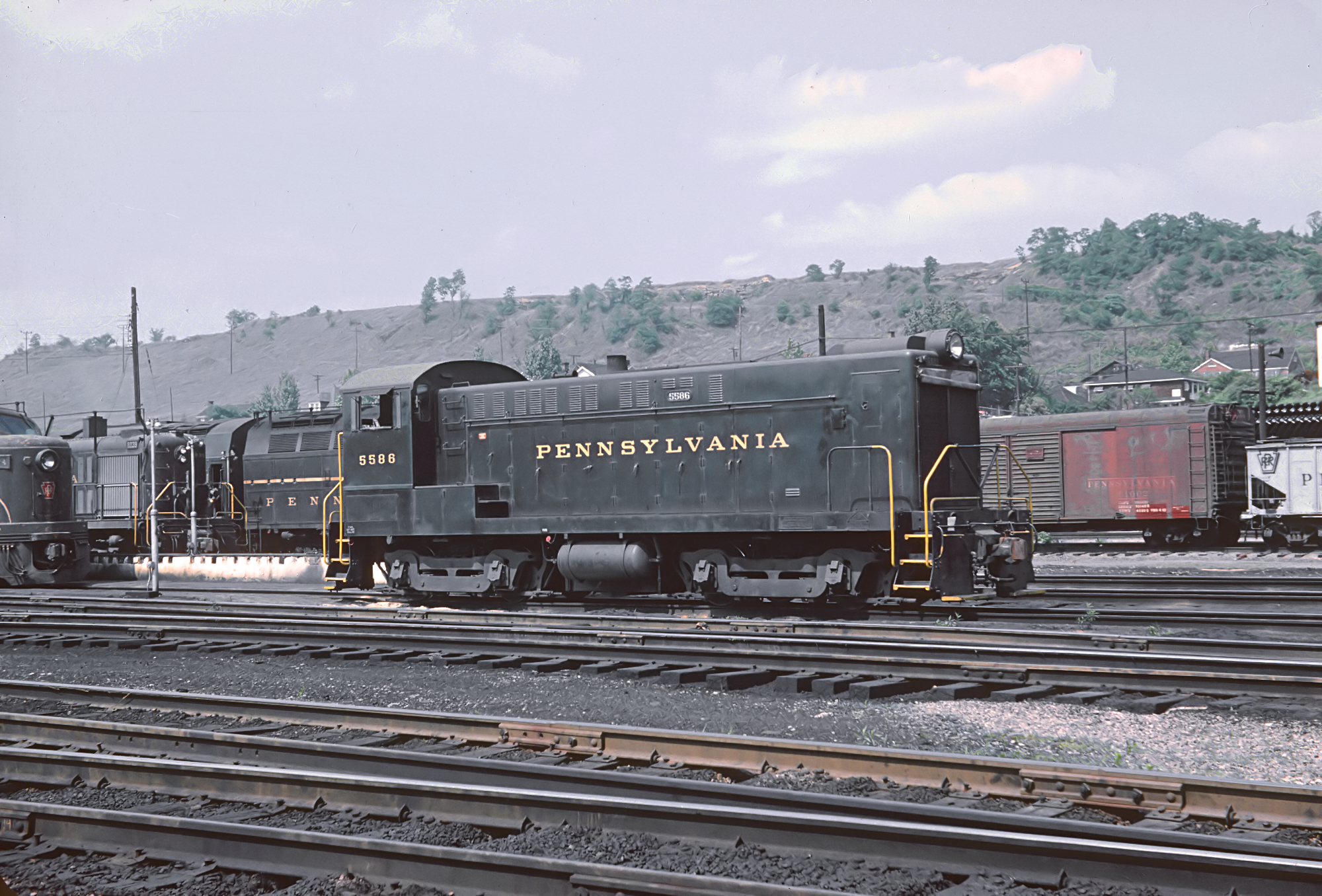
- Pennsylvania Railroad DS4-4-1000-SC #5586 in Conway Yard, Conway, Pennsylvania (date unknown)
Type and origin
- Power type: Diesel–electric
- Builder: Baldwin Locomotive Works
- Model: DS-4-4-1000 (606SC)
- Build date: January 1948 – November 1951
- Total produced: 446
Specifications
- Configuration
  - AAR: B-B
- Gauge: 4 ft 8 1/2 in (1,435 mm)
- Length: 46 ft 6 1/4 in (14.18 m)
- Width: 9 ft 11 1/4 in (3.03 m)
- Height: 14 ft (4.27 m)
- Loco weight: 230,000 lb (100,000 kg)
- Prime mover: Baldwin 606SC
- RPM range: 625 rpm max.
- Engine type: Four-stroke diesel
- Aspiration: Turbocharged
- Displacement: 1,979 cu in (32.43 L) per cylinder 11,874 cu in (194.58 L) total
- Generator: Westinghouse 480DC
- Traction motors: Westinghouse 362-D, 4 off
- Cylinders: Straight-6
- Cylinder size: 12 3/4 in × 15 1/2 in (324 mm × 394 mm)
- Loco brake: Air
- Train brakes: Air
Performance figures
- Power output: 1,000 hp (746 kW)
- Tractive effort: 57,500 lb (26,100 kg)
Career
- Locale: North America

The Baldwin DS-4-4-1000 were two models of four-axle 1,000 horsepower (746 kW) diesel–electric switcher locomotives built by the Baldwin Locomotive Works between 1946 and 1951. The first models (56 locomotives) were powered by an 8-cylinder normally aspirated prime mover, but from 1948, a change was made to the second model powered by a 6-cylinder turbocharged engine. These two models replaced the VO-1000 in Baldwin's catalogue, and were in turn replaced by the S-12 in 1951.

== Original owners ==
=== 608NA (Normally Aspirated) engine ===
Image	Railroad	Quantity	Road numbers	Notes
	Belt Railway of Chicago	1	405	
	Copper Range Railroad	2	100–101	
	Detroit Terminal Railroad	1	103	
	Erie Railroad	2*	600–601	
	Missouri-Kansas-Texas Railroad	11	1000–1010	renumbered 22–32 in 1960; rebuilt by EMD with 1000-hp 12-567C engines between February 1959 and April 1960
	New York, Chicago and St. Louis Railroad ("Nickel Plate Road")	2	100–101	
	Norfolk Southern Railway	2	1001–1002	
	Reading Company	14*	26–39	
	St. Louis Southwestern Railway ("Cotton Belt")	5	1023–1027	
	Seaboard Air Line Railroad	8*	1417–1424	
	U.S. Steel, Geneva Steel Division	6*	21–26	
	Western Maryland Railway	2	133–134	
	Total	56		

=== 606SC (Turbocharged) engine ===
Image	Railroad	Quantity	Road numbers	Notes
	Akron and Barberton Belt Railroad	1	26	
	American Smelting and Refining Company	2	101–102	
	Atchison, Topeka and Santa Fe Railway	41	2200 (second), 2260–2299	
	Atlanta and West Point Rail Road	2	676–677	
	Baldwin Locomotive Works (test)	1	100DF	Dual Fuel experiment with Bunker C Oil and Diesel, rebuilt to standard specification and sold to Patapsco and Back Rivers; Railroad #335
	Baltimore and Ohio Railroad	49	376–399, 438–462	renumbered 9225–9273
	Bessemer and Lake Erie Railroad	1	282	to Geneva Steel #38
	Calumet and Hecla Mining Company	2	201–202	to Escanaba and Lake Superior
	Canadian Pacific Railway	11	7065–7075	built by Baldwin Locomotive Works; 1 preserved in Toronto (7069)
	Central of Georgia Railway	2	36–37	
	Central Railroad of Pennsylvania (Central Railroad of New Jersey)	3	1073–1075	
	Chicago and North Western Railway	5	1018–1022	
	Chicago Great Western Railway	10	32–41	
	Chicago, Milwaukee, St. Paul and Pacific Railroad ("Milwaukee Road")	10	1692–1697, 1901–1904	renumbered 940–949
	Chicago, St. Paul, Minneapolis and Omaha Railway ("Omaha Road")	2	99–100	
	Erie Railroad	15*	602–616	
	Georgia Railroad	1	921	
	Ironton Railroad	2	750–751	750 to Patapsco and Back Rivers #348; 751 to Conrail #8354
	Kentucky and Indiana Terminal Railroad	2	53–54	
	Lehigh Valley Railroad	8	140–148	
	Long Island Rail Road	1	450	
	Minneapolis, St. Paul and Sault Ste. Marie Railroad ("Soo Line")	2	311–312	
	Missouri Pacific Railroad	17	9120–9127, 9133–9141	renumbered 1066–1073, 1074–1082
	Missouri Pacific Railroad (St. Louis, Brownsville and Mexico Railway)	8	9148–9149, 9162–9167	renumbered 1083, —, 1092–1097
	Oakland Terminal Railway	1	101	
	Oliver Iron Mining Company	5	928–932	
	Patapsco and Back Rivers Railroad	8	337–344	
	Pennsylvania Railroad	136	5550–5590, 5968–5979, 9050–9079, 9122–9275, 9434	PRR Class BS-10a
	Reading Company	30*	700–729	
	St. Louis-San Francisco Railway ("Frisco")	4	238–241	
	Seaboard Air Line Railroad	27*	1435–1461	to Seaboard Coast Line Railroad #51–73
	Southern Railway	5	2285–2289	
	Southern Pacific Company	10	1393–1402	
	Terminal Railroad Association of St. Louis	2	602–603	
	Union Pacific Railroad	5	1206–1210	
	United States Army Corps of Engineers	2	L-4, W8380	
	U.S. Steel, Carnegie-Illinois Steel Division	3	74–76	
	U.S. Steel, Geneva Steel Division	6*	27–32	
	Wabash Railroad	1	304	rebuilt as calf (without a cab) in 1961 after collision damage
	Western Railway of Alabama	1	630	
	Total	446		

*Ordered Both 608NA & 606SC Models

== Preservation ==
Several locomotives survive in preservation:

- ATSF #2260 is preserved at the Museum of the American Railroad in Frisco, Texas.
- Canadian Pacific #7069 is preserved by a private owner and displayed at the Toronto Railway Museum in Toronto, Ontario.
- Missouri-Kansas-Texas #1006 is preserved at the Parsons Historical Society in Parsons, Kansas.
- Oakland Terminal #101 is preserved on the Niles Canyon Railway in Sunol, California.
- Reading #702 is preserved at the Reading Railroad Heritage Museum in Hamburg, Pennsylvania.
